= List of Egyptian mummies (royalty) =

The following is a list of mummies that include Egyptian pharaohs and their named mummified family members. (Note: Mummies have been found by archaeologists who have determined their royal status, but have not been able to provide any real conclusive name. These are usually given informal numbers based on their tomb locations (ex: KV##A (Valley of the Kings) and QV##A (Valley of the Queens)). These nameless individuals are not listed here as not enough given information is available.) Some of these mummies have been found to be remarkably intact, while others have been damaged from tomb robbers and environmental conditions (with some only having small fragments representing the mummy as a result). It was not until Pharaoh Den of the first dynasty that things such as a staircase and architectural elements were added which provided better protection from the elements.

Note that if a photo of the mummy is not available, then a photo of their coffin or funerary mask will be used in its place.

== Identified ==
Image	Name	Alias	Year of death	Dynasty	Gender	Year discovered	Short summary
—N/a	Aat	The Great One	Unknown	12th	Female	1892	Her fragmented remains were recovered from her burial chamber in the Pyramid of Amenemhat III at Dahshur.
	Ahhotep II	—N/a	Unknown	17th	Female	1858	The mummy of Ahhotep II was destroyed in 1859.
	Ahmose (princess)	Child of the Moon	Unknown	17th	Female	1903–1905	Princess Ahmose was buried in tomb QV47 in the Valley of the Queens. Her mummy was discovered by Ernesto Schiaparelli during his excavations from 1903 to 1905.
	Ahmose I	Amasis	1525 BC	18th	Male	1881	Ahmose I's mummy was discovered in 1881 within the Deir el-Bahri Cache. His name was later found written in hieroglyphs when the mummy was unwrapped. His body bears signs of having been plundered by ancient grave-robbers as the head is broken off from his body and his nose smashed.
	Ahmose-Henutemipet	—N/a	Unknown	17th/18th	Female	1881	Ahmose-Henutemipet was found in 1881 entombed in DB320. Her remains were found badly damaged, likely by tomb robbers.
	Ahmose-Henuttamehu	• Child of the Moon, • Mistress of Lower Egypt	Unknown	17th/18th	Female	1881	Ahmose-Henuttamehu was found in 1881 entombed in DB320. Like Ahmose-Henutemipet, she was found to be an old woman when she died as her teeth are worn.
	Ahmose-Meritamon	Meryetamun	Unknown	17th	Female	1881	Ahmose-Meritamon was found entombed in DB320. Like other mummies of the era, she was found to be heavily damaged by tomb robbers. An examination of her mummy shows that she suffered a head wound prior to her death which was the possible result of falling backwards. CT scanning in 2020 estimated her to be in her 50s at death. She had extensively hardened arteries (atherosclerosis) and is suggested to have died of a heart attack. Her unusual pose is likely the position she died in and was mummified in it due to the onset of rigor mortis.
	Ahmose-Meritamun	Ahmose-Meritamon	Unknown	18th	Female	1930	Her mummy was found carefully rewrapped, which was determined to have occurred during the reign of Pinedjem I.
	Ahmose Inhapy	Ahmose-Inhapi	Unknown	17th/18th	Female	1881	Inhapi's mummy was found in the outer coffin of Lady Rai, the nurse of Inhapy's niece Queen Ahmose-Nefertari. Her skin was still present, and no evidence of salt was found. The body was sprinkled with aromatic powdered wood and wrapped in resin soaked linen.
—N/a	Ahmose-Sitamun	Sitamun	Unknown	18th	Female	Unknown	Ahmose-Sitamun was found entombed in DB320. At some point she was moved to the Egyptian Museum in Cairo where she remains to this day.
	Ahmose-Sitkamose	Sitkamose	1533 BC	17th/18th	Female	1881	Sitkamose's mummy was discovered in 1881 in the Deir el-Bahari cache. Her mummy was unwrapped by Gaston Maspero on June 19, 1886, where it was found to be damaged by tomb robbers. Sitkamose was about thirty years old when she died, Grafton Eliot Smith described her as a strong-built, almost masculine woman.
—N/a	Ahmose-Tumerisy	—N/a	Unknown	17th	Female	Unknown	Her mummy was found in the pit MMA 1019 in Sheikh Abd el-Qurna.
—N/a	Amenemhat III	Amenemhet III, Ammenemes III	Unknown	12th	Male	1888	Only fragments of burnt human remains were found in the looted burial chamber of the Pyramid of Amenemhat III at Hawara. These were examined by Flinders Petrie, who confirmed their owner.
	Amenemhat	Son of Thutmose IV	Unknown	18th	Male	1903	Amenemhat was a prince of the Eighteenth Dynasty of Egypt; the son of Pharaoh Thutmose IV. He is depicted in the Theban tomb TT64, which is the tomb of the royal tutors Heqareshu and his son Heqaerneheh. He died young and was buried in his father's tomb in the Valley of the Kings, KV43, together with his father and a sister called Tentamun. His canopic jars and possible mummy were found there.
	Amenemope	Usermaatre Amenemope	992 or 984 BC	21st	Male	1946	While the tomb was discovered in 1940, his mummy was not found until the end of World War II. The mummy was found with various jewelry and two funerary masks which are now all displayed at the Cairo Museum.
—N/a	Amenemopet	—N/a	Unknown	18th	Female	1857	The mummy of Amenemopet was buried in the Sheikh Abd el-Qurna cache where it was discovered in 1857.
	Amenhotep I	Amenophis I	1506 or 1504 BC	18th	Male	Unknown	His mummy was moved sometime in the 20th or 21st Dynasty for safety, probably more than once. The mummy of Amenhotep I features an exquisite face mask which has caused his body not to be unwrapped by Egyptologists. CT scans showed that the body had suffered post-mortem damage at the hands of robbers, with his head, left arm, right hand, and right foot being detached; there is also a large hole in the front of his torso.
	Amenhotep II	Amenophis II	1401 or 1397 BC	18th	Male	1898	Amenhotep was found to bear a strong facial resemblance to his son, Thutmose IV. The wavy brown hair present on his head is "abundantly interspersed with white." It is estimated that he was forty to fifty at the time of death based on his worn teeth and greying hair.
	Amenhotep III	Amāna-Ḥātpa	1353 or 1351 BC	18th	Male	1898	Amenhotep's mummy shows an unusually heavy use of subcutaneous stuffing (for the period) to make the mummy look more lifelike.
—N/a	Ankhesenpepi II	Ankhesenmeryre II	Unknown	6th	Female	1998	Ankhesenpepi's fragmented skeletal remains were recovered from her pyramid in Saqqara.
—N/a	Djedkare Isesi	Tancheres	c. 2375 BC	5th	Male	1940s	Djedkare's fragmented skeletal remains were recovered from his pyramid at Saqqara. He died aged 50–60 years and had a slim build. The bones were confirmed to be his through comparison with the remains of his known daughters and through radiocarbon dating.
	Duathathor-Henuttawy	Henuttawy	Unknown	20th	Female	1881	
	Henhenet	—N/a	Unknown	11th	Female	Unknown	Henhenet's mummy shows that she died in childbirth when she was about 21 years old.
—N/a	Henuttawy C	Henettawy	Unknown	21st	Female	1923–1924	
	Hornakht	Harnakht	Unknown	22nd	Male	1942	
	Hor Awibre	Hor	1775 BC	13th	Male	1894	The mummy of Hor Awibre had been ransacked for his jewelry by tomb robbers and his unwrapped mummy was left in his coffin. The king was determined to have been in his forties at the time of his death.
	Sekhemre-Wepmaat Intef	Intef V	1571 BC	17th	Male	1827	The coffin and mummy of Sekhemre-Wepmaat Intef were discovered in the 19th century by inhabitants of Kurna. The Priesse Papyrus was found inside his rishi coffin.
	Nubkheperre Intef	Intef VI	1568 BC	17th	Male	1827	The coffin and mummy of Nubkheperre Intef were discovered in the 19th century by inhabitants of Kurna. A diadem or crown, some bows and arrows was found inside the rishi coffin.
	Sekhemre-Heruhirmaat Intef	Intef VII	1567 BC	17th	Male	1827	The coffin and mummy of Sekhemre-Heruhirmaat Intef were discovered in the 19th century by inhabitants of Kurna. His sarcophagus contained the corrected nomen of this king as well as his prenomen, Sekhemre-Heruhirmaat, "which was added in ink on the chest of the coffin."
	Kamose	—N/a	1550 BC	17th	Male	1857	In 1857, the mummy of Kamose was discovered seemingly deliberately hidden in a pile of debris. Egyptologists Auguste Mariette, and Heinrich Brugsch noted that the mummy was in very poor shape. The name of the pharaoh inscribed on the coffin was only recognized fifty years after the original discovery, by which time the mummy, which had been left with the pile of debris on which it was found, was almost certainly long lost.
—N/a	Mayet	Miit	2010 BC	11th	Female	1921	Mayet's position within the royal family of Mentuhotep II is disputed. It is generally assumed that she was a daughter of the king as she was about five years old when she died.
	Merneptah	Merenptah	1203 BC	19th	Male	1898	
—N/a	Mutnedjmet	Various	1319 or 1332 BC	18th	Female	Unknown	The presence of an infant along with Mutnedjmet in the tomb suggests that this queen died in childbirth.
—N/a	Nauny	Nany	Unknown	21st	Female	Unknown	
—N/a	Nebetia	—N/a	Unknown	18th	Female	1857	
—N/a	Neferefre	Raneferef	c. 2458 BC	5th	Male	Unknown	Fragments of human remains and wrappings were found in the looted burial chamber of the Pyramid of Neferefre. All that remained of Neferefre's mummy were his left hand, a left clavicle still covered with skin, fragments of skin probably from his forehead, an upper eyelid and his left foot.
—N/a	Nefertari	Nefertari Meritmut	1255 BC	19th	Female	1904	Fragments of human remains were found in the looted burial chamber of the Tomb of Nefertari. All that remain are of Nefertari's mummy were its knees, which were found in the burial chamber, and were taken to the Egyptian Museum in Turin by Schiaparelli, where they are still kept today.
	Nesitanebetashru	—N/a	Unknown	21st	Female	Unknown	
	Nubhetepti-khered	—N/a	Unknown	13th	Female	1894	Nubhetepti was 5 to 10 years old when she died.
	Pentawer	Pentaweret; Unknown man E	1155 BC	20th	Male	1881	Formerly known as "Unknown Man E", a study suggests that Pentawer died by strangulation or hanging when he was 18 to 20 years old. Subsequent DNA analysis shows that the mummy was a son of Ramesses III as they both share the paternal Y-DNA haplogroup E1b1a and half their DNA.
—N/a	Pepi I	Pepy	c. 2283 BC	6th	Male	1880	Fragments of human remains and wrappings were found in the looted burial chamber of the Pyramid of Pepi I.
—N/a	Pyhia	• Pyihia • Petepihu	Unknown	18th	Female	1857	Pyhia or Pyihia or Petepihu (Ancient Egyptian: p3-ỉḥỉ3) was a princess during the 18th Dynasty, and the daughter of Thutmose IV. Her mummy was reburied in the Sheikh Abd el-Qurna cache along with that of several other princesses: her probable sisters Amenemopet and Tiaa; her niece Nebetia and Princesses Tatau, Henutiunu, Merytptah, Sithori and Wiay.
	Psusennes I	Pasibkhanu	1001 BC	21st	Male	1940	While his intact tomb was discovered in 1940, his mummy was not found until the end of World War II. The mummy was found with various jewelry, a silver coffin and a funerary mask which are now all displayed at the Cairo Museum.
—N/a	Psusennes II	Pasibkhanu II	943 BC	21st	Male	1940	Mummy found in the tomb of Psusennes I 1940. His mummy show signs of water damage, meaning that original tomb may have been inundated by the Nile which compelled a reburial of this king in Psusennes I's tomb.
	Ramesses I	Ramses	1290 BC	19th	Male	1817	
	Ramesses II	Ramesses the Great	1213 BC	19th	Male	1881	
	Ramesses III	Usimare Ramesses III	1155 BC	20th	Male	1886	
	Ramesses IV	Heqamaatre Ramesses IV	1149 BC	20th	Male	1898	
	Ramesses V	Usermaatre Sekheperenre Ramesses V	1145 BC	20th	Male	1898	
	Ramesses VI	Ramesses VI Nebmaatre-Meryamun	1137 BC	20th	Male	1898	
—N/a	Ramesses IX	Amon-her-khepshef Khaemwaset	1111 BC	20th	Male	1881	
—N/a	Ranefer	Ranofer	Unknown	4th	Male	Unknown	Ranefer's Eastward facing remains were found to be molded and painted in black, red, and green. The brain was left inside his skull as was custom in the early mummification process.
—N/a	Senebkay	Woseribre Senebkay	1650 BC	16th (Note: Senebkay could have ruled over the hypothesized Abydos Dynasty.)	Male	2014	The skeleton of Senebkay shows he was around 5 feet 10 inches (1.78 metres) tall and that he died at the age of 35 to 40 from multiple wounds, most likely sustained in battle.
—N/a	Senusret II	Sesostris II	1878 BC	12th	Male	1890	Fragments of human remains were found in the looted burial chamber of the Pyramid of Senusret II and examined by Flinders Petrie. All that remains of Senusret's mummy are his leg bones.
	Seqenenre Tao	• Seqenera Djehuty-aa, • Sekenenra Taa	Unknown	17th	Male	1881	In 2021, a CT scan of his mummy revealed that he died in his forties, possibly on a battlefield, while his deformed hands imply that he was possibly imprisoned with his hands tied. A reconstruction of his death suggests that Seqenenre was executed by the Hyksos king Apepi.
—N/a	Sesheshet	Sesh	Unknown	6th	Female	2009	Sesheshet's mummy was found wrapped in cloth, and her sarcophagus appeared to have been looted. Robbers stole most of the valuables leaving the body parts behind.
	Seti I	• Sethi I, • Sethos I	1279 BC	19th	Male	1881	
	Seti II	• Sethi II, • Sethos II	1193 BC	19th	Male	1908	
	Shoshenq II	• Heqakheperre Shoshenq II • Shoshenq IIa	885 BC	22nd	Male	1940	Mummy found in the tomb of Psusennes I 1940. His mummy show signs of water damage, meaning that original tomb may have been inundated by the Nile which compelled a reburial of this king in Psusennes I's tomb.
—N/a	Siamun	Neterkheperre	967 BC	21st	Male	1940	Mummy found in the tomb of Psusennes I 1940. His mummy show signs of water damage, meaning that original tomb may have been inundated by the Nile which compelled a reburial of this king in Psusennes I's tomb.
	Siptah	Merenptah Siptah	1191 BC	19th	Male	1898	
	Sitdjehuti	Satdjehuti	Unknown	17th	Female	1820	Sitdjehuti's body was found in her sarcophagus wrapped in linin with golden mask, a heart scarab. The linens were donated by her niece Queen Ahmose-Nefertari.
—N/a	Teti	Othoes	c. 2333 BC	6th	Male	Unknown	Fragments of human remains and wrappings were found in the looted burial chamber of the Pyramid of Teti. All that remain of Teti's mummy are his arm and shoulder blade.
	Thutmose II	Various	1479 BC	18th	Male	1881	
	Thutmose III	Various	1425 BC	18th	Male	1881	
	Thutmose IV	Menkheperure	1391 or 1388 BC	18th	Male	1898	
—N/a	Tiaa (princess)	—N/a	Unknown	18th	Female	1857	
	Tiye	The Older Lady	1338 BC	18th	Female	1898	Tiye was found to be extensively damaged by past tomb robbers.
	Tutankhamun	King Tut	1323 BC	18th	Male	1922	See: Tutankhamun's mummy
	Tjuyu	• Thuya, • Thuyu	1375 BC	18th	Female	1905	
—N/a	Unas	Onnos	c. 2345 BC	5th	Male	1881	Fragments of human remains and wrappings were found in the looted burial chamber of the Pyramid of Unas and examined by E. A. Wallis Budge. All that remains of Unas's mummy are his right arm, skull, ribs and shinbone.
	Webensenu	Vepansen	Unknown	18th	Male	1898	Webensenu was an ancient Egyptian prince of the 18th Dynasty. He was a son of Pharaoh Amenhotep II. He is mentioned, along with his brother Nedjem, on a statue of Minmose, overseer of the works in Karnak. He died as a child and was buried in his father's tomb, KV35, where there were found his canopic jars and shabtis. His mummy is still there, and it indicates that he died around the age of ten.

== Disputed ==
The following entries are either previously identified mummies that are now in dispute or mummies whose identity is still in dispute. Over time through the advance in technology, new information comes to light that discredits old findings and beliefs. The mummies that have been lost or destroyed since initial discovery may never be properly identified.

Image	Assumed name(s)	Alias	Dynasty	Sex	Year discovered	Description
	Ahmose-Nefertari	—N/a	18th	Female	1881	Ahmose-Nefertari is assumed to have been retrieved from her tomb at the end of the New Kingdom and moved to the royal cache in DB320. Her presumed body, with no identification marks, was discovered in the 19th century and unwrapped in 1885 by Emile Brugsch but this identification has been challenged. When the mummy was found it emitted such a bad odor that it was reburied on museum grounds in Cairo until the offensive smell abated. If this is Ahmose-Nefertari, then she was determined to have died in her 70s. The mummy's hair had been thinning and plaits of false hair had been woven in with its own to cover this up. The body also had been damaged in antiquity and was missing its right hand. Despite the disputed attribution, the mummy was included in the 2021 Pharaohs' Golden Parade.
	Ahmose Sapair	—N/a	18th	Male	1881	In 1881, a mummy of a 5- to 6-year-old boy was found in cache (DB320) and identified as Ahmose-Sipair. This was disputed as Prince Ahmose-Sipair is always portrayed as an adult on the coffin of the scribe and other antiquities, thus the child-mummy cannot be his.
—N/a	Djer or Merneith	—N/a	1st	Male or Female	1900	A bandaged, mummified forearm with four small bracelets was discovered by Egyptologist Flinders Petrie in Djer's tomb, but was later discarded in 1901 by Émile Brugsch as the latter was only interested in the bracelets. However, it is disputed that the forearm may have instead belonged to his wife, Merneith, since her tomb was nearby. The loss of the artifact has prevented any modern anthropological or genetic testing to verify its identity.
	Akhenaten or Smenkhkare	KV55 mummy	18th	Male	1907	Uncertainty remains over the identity of this mummy as the young age at death is inconsistent with Akhenaten's reign. CT scans done in 2010 strongly suggest that the mummy may be Pharaoh Smenkhkare.
—N/a	Ankhesenamun	KV21A	18th	Female	1817	Assumed to be Ankhesenamun, as she is the mother of the two fetuses found in Tutankhamun's tomb. Uncertainty remains if the mummy found in KV55 is accepted to be Akhenaten. She is also known as mummy KV21A, after the tomb that she was discovered in.
	Hatshepsut	KV60A	18th	Female	1903	In 1903, Howard Carter had discovered tomb KV60 in the Valley of the Kings. It contained two female mummies: one identified as Hatshepsut's wet nurse and the other unidentified. The latter of the two (KV60A), was removed from the tomb in 2007 and identified as Hatshepsut by inspecting the mouth. These results have since been disputed from a 2011 study which cited a misplaced molar.
	Beketaten, Nebetah or Nefertiti	The Younger Lady	18th	Female	1898	This mummy was found lying in a side chamber of KV35. The body was extensively damaged by past tomb robbers which caused numerous holes. Early speculation was that the mummy belonged to Queen Nefertiti. DNA testing published in 2010 revealed The Younger Lady is a daughter of Pharaoh Amenhotep III and his chief wife Tiye and the mother of Tutankhamun. This report concluded that the mummy is likely Beketaten, or Nebetah. Despite the DNA results, Egyptologists such as Marc Gabolde and Aidan Dodson support the identification of this body as that of Nefertiti.
	Merenre Nemtyemsaf I	—N/a	6th	Male	1881	A mummy was uncovered in 1881 by Émile and Heinrich Karl Brugsch in the black basalt sarcophagus of the burial chamber of the Pyramid of Merenre. The mummy is that of a 1.66 m (5.4 ft)-tall man, already in a poor condition at discovery as ancient tomb robbers had partially torn off its wrappings. The Brugsch brothers further damaged the mummy while transporting it back to Cairo. Preliminary forensic analyses indicated that it belonged to a young man, with possible traces of his sidelock of youth still visible at the time of discovery. The identity of the mummy remains uncertain as Grafton Elliot Smith, who performed these analyses, observed that the technique employed for the wrapping was typical of the 18th Dynasty rather than the 6th. Re-wrapping of older mummies are known to have occurred, even during the New Kingdom, so that this observation does not necessarily preclude that the mummy be that of Merenre. The mummy has not been studied since and its identification remains uncertain.
	Sanakht	—N/a	3rd	Male	1901	A mummy was uncovered in 1881 by John Garstang in the large mastaba K2 at Beit Khallaf. The mummy was over 1.87 m (6 ft 1 1/2 in) tall, which is considerably taller than the 1.67 m (5 ft 6 in) average of prehistoric and later Egyptians. The specimen's skull was very large and capacious. Although his cranial index was unusually broad and almost brachycephalic, the proportions of his long bones were tropically adapted like those of most other ancient Egyptians; especially those from the predynastic period. His overall cranial features, however, were closer to those of dynastic period Egyptian skulls. It was long thought that the mummy inside mastaba K2 at Beit Khallaf was Sanakht's, as excavations there yielded relief fragments bearing his name. However, some Egyptologists now regard this mastaba as the burial of a high official, prince or queen rather than that of a pharaoh, while others continue to support the first hypothesis.
	Setnakhte	The mummy in the boat	20th	Male	1898	The alleged mummy of Setnakhte has never been identified with certainty, although the so–called "mummy in the boat" found in KV35 was sometimes identified with him, an attribution rejected by Aidan Dodson who rather believes the body belonged to a royal family member of Amenhotep II of the 18th Dynasty. In any case the mummy was destroyed by looters in 1901, thus preventing any analysis on it.
—N/a	Sneferu	—N/a	4th	Male	1950	Fragments of human remains and wrappings were found in the burial chamber of the Red Pyramid and examined by Dr. Ahmed Mahmud el Batrawi. The remains belonged to a middle-aged man and the wrappings were consistent with Old Kingdom mummification techniques. It is uncertain if these remains belong to Sneferu.
	Tetisheri	Unknown woman B	17th/18th	Female	1881	No tomb has yet been conclusively identified with Queen Tetisheri, though a mummy that may be hers was included among other members of the royal family that were reburied in the Royal Cache.
	Thutmose I or Ahmose Sapair	—N/a	18th	Male	1881	Egyptologist Gaston Maspero thought this was the mummy of Thutmose I largely on the strength of familial resemblance to the mummies of Thutmose II and Thutmose III. In 2007 though, Dr. Zahi Hawass announced that the mummy is a thirty-year-old man who had died as a result of an arrow wound to the chest. Due to the young age of the mummy and the cause of death, it was determined that the mummy was probably not of Thutmose I and the mummy could actually be Ahmose Sapair. Despite this, the mummy was included in the 2021 Pharaohs' Golden Parade.
90px	Unknown	Qurna Queen	17th	Female	1908	The quality of the Qurna Queen's burial goods and the location of her grave near the valley of the kings have led researchers to conclude that she was a senior member of the royal family. Damage to her coffin means her name is lost.

== See also ==
- List of bog bodies
- List of pharaohs
- Animal mummy
- List of Theban tombs
