= Amenemopet (princess) =

- King's Daughter
Egyptian name
i mn n Aa15 O45
- Dynasty: 18th Dynasty
- Father: Probably Thutmose IV

Amenemopet was an ancient Egyptian princess (king's daughter) during the 18th Dynasty, probably a daughter of Thutmose IV.

She is shown sitting upon the knees of her tutor Horemheb, in his Theban tomb (TT78). Horemheb (not identical with the pharaoh of the same name) served under the reigns of Amenhotep II, Thutmose IV and Amenhotep III, so the princess could have been the daughter of any of these pharaohs, but Thutmose is the most likely.

She died during the reign of Amenhotep III. Later, her mummy was reburied in Sheikh Abd el-Qurna cache along with that of several other princesses: her probable sisters Tiaa and Petepihu; her niece Nebetia and Princesses Tatau, Henutiunu, Merytptah, Sithori and Wiay. The tomb was discovered in 1857.
