= TT64 =

Theban tomb

Coordinates: 25.7333°N 32.6000°E

Theban tomb TT64
- Burial site of Hekerneheh
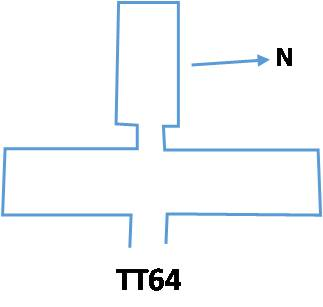

- Location within Egypt
- Location: Sheikh Abd el-Qurna, Theban Necropolis
- ← Previous; TT63 Next → TT65

S38 q Y1 r H N5 H
Hekerneheh
in hieroglyphs
Era: New Kingdom
(1550–1069 BC)

The Theban Tomb TT64 is located in Sheikh Abd el-Qurna. It forms part of the Theban Necropolis, situated on the west bank of the Nile opposite Luxor. The tomb is the burial place of the ancient Egyptian Hekerneheh, who was a King's Tutor of Prince Amenhotep during the reign of Tuthmosis IV and lived into the reign of Amenhotep III in the Eighteenth Dynasty.

Hekerneheh is shown with the King's son Amenhotep, who would later become Amenhotep III. Behind Hekerneheh six royal princes are shown. One of them is a prince Amenemhat, who was a son of Tuthmosis IV and whose canopic jars were found in his father's tomb KV43.

== See also ==
- List of Theban tombs
- N. de Garis Davies – Nina and Norman de Garis Davies, Egyptologists
