= Nebetiah =

Nebetiah may be a spelling variant for the names of two Ancient Egyptian princesses:

- Nebetia, possible granddaughter of Thutmose IV
- Nebetah, daughter of Amenhotep III and Tiye
