= Siatum =

zA Z1 t U15
Siatum
in hieroglyphs
Era: New Kingdom
(1550–1069 BC)

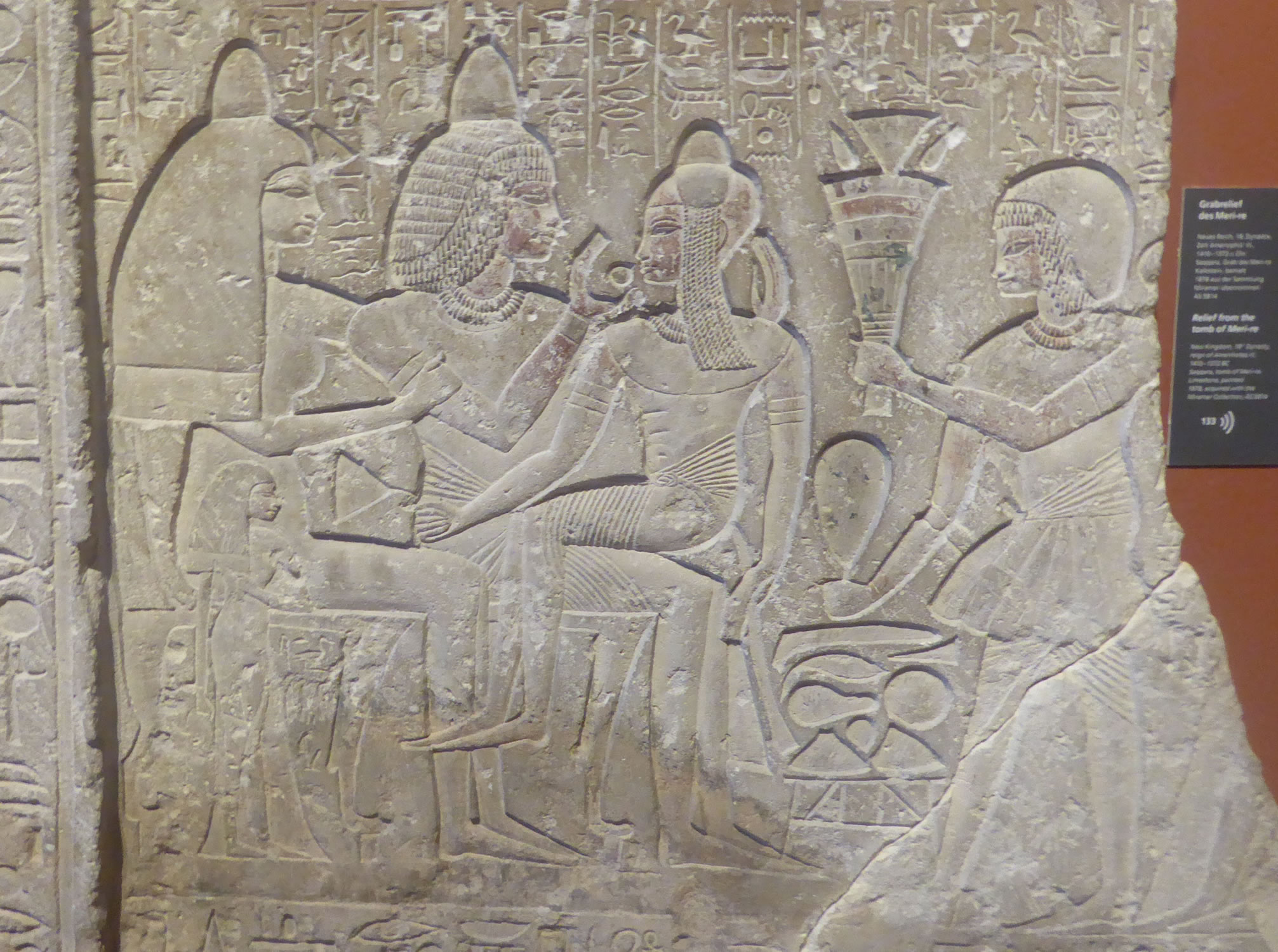
Siatum and Meryre

Siatum was an ancient Egyptian prince of the 18th Dynasty. He was likely one of the sons of Pharaoh Thutmose IV and thus the brother or half-brother of Amenhotep III.

His existence is known from two sources: one is a mummy-label found on the mummy of his daughter Nebetia, where he is mentioned as her father; the other is a Saqqaran relief of his tutor, Meryre, where a person named Siatum is depicted sitting on Meryre's knee. There is no direct evidence linking the two persons – Nebetia's father and Meryre's pupil – together, but the style of the relief dates it to Amenhotep's reign, so Meryre must have been tutor either during Amenhotep's or his predecessor's reign, and Siatum's name corresponds to part of Thutmose's Horus name.

== Sources ==
- Aidan Dodson & Dyan Hilton, The Complete Royal Families of Ancient Egypt, Thames & Hudson (2004), p. 137, 140. ISBN 0-500-05128-3
- Arielle P. Kozloff & Betsy M. Bryan: Egypt’s Dazzling Sun: Amenhotep III and His World (1992), p. 292. ISBN 0-940717-17-4, pp. 67–68
