= TT63 =

Ancient Egyptian tomb

Coordinates: 25.7333°N 32.6000°E

Theban tomb TT63
- Burial site of Sobekhotep
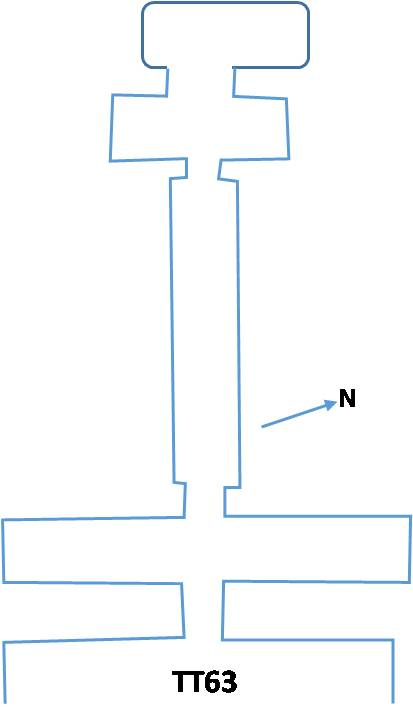

- Location within Egypt
- Location: Sheikh Abd el-Qurna, Theban Necropolis
- ← Previous; TT62 Next → TT64

s b k I4 R4 t p
Sobekhotep
in hieroglyphs
Era: New Kingdom
(1550–1069 BC)

The Theban Tomb TT63 is located in Sheikh Abd el-Qurna. It forms part of the Theban Necropolis, situated on the west bank of the Nile opposite to Luxor.

The tomb belongs to an 18th Dynasty ancient Egyptian named Sobekhotep, who was treasurer and the mayor of the Southern Lake and the Land of Sobek (Faiyum) during the reign of Thutmosis IV.

Sobekhotep was the son of an Overseer of the Seal named Min. Sobekhotep's wife Meryt was the Nurse of the King's daughter Tiaa and the Chief of the Harem of Sobek of Shedty.

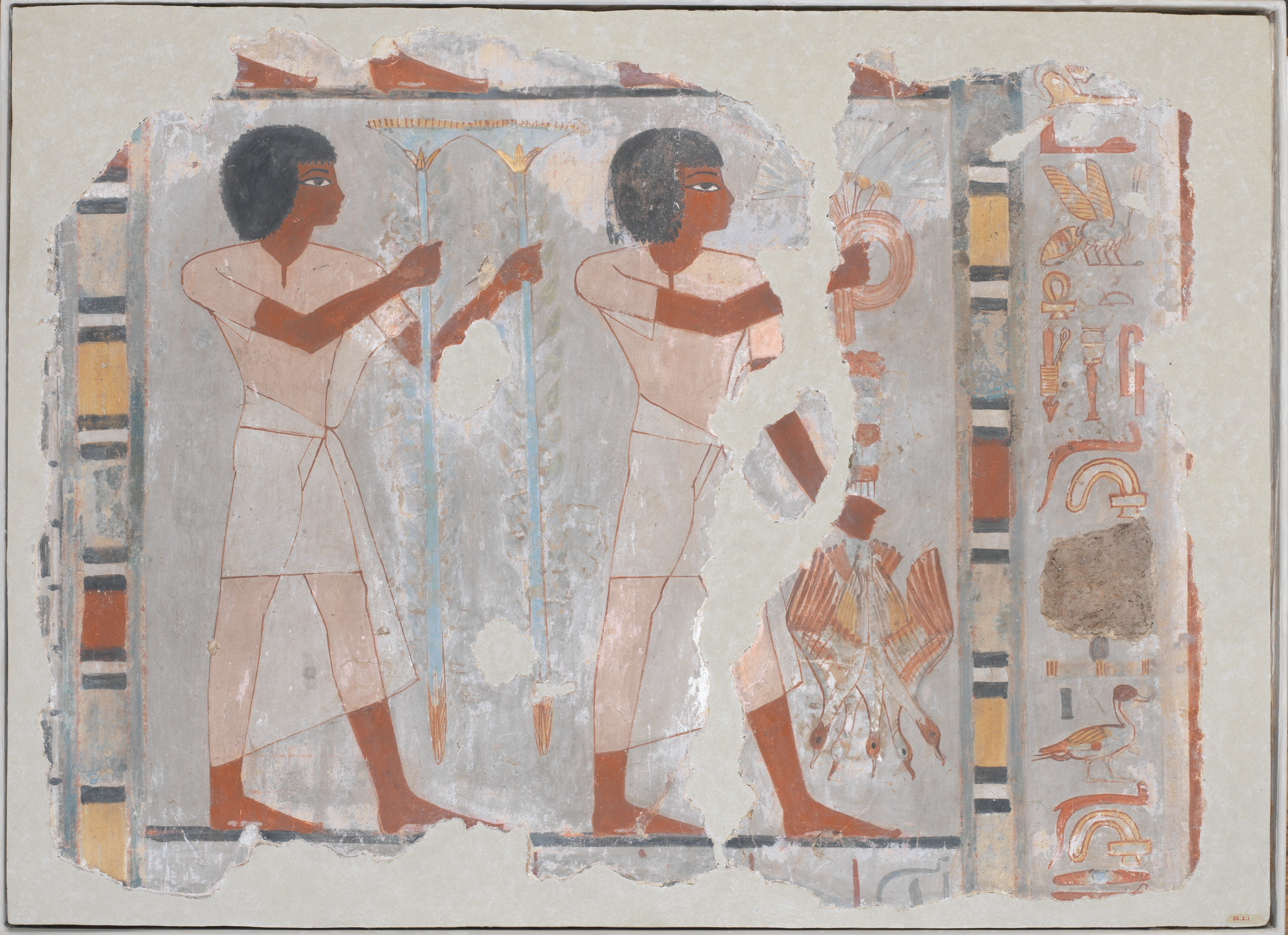
Fragment of a wall painting from TT63 depicting men carrying papyrus reeds and waterfowl.

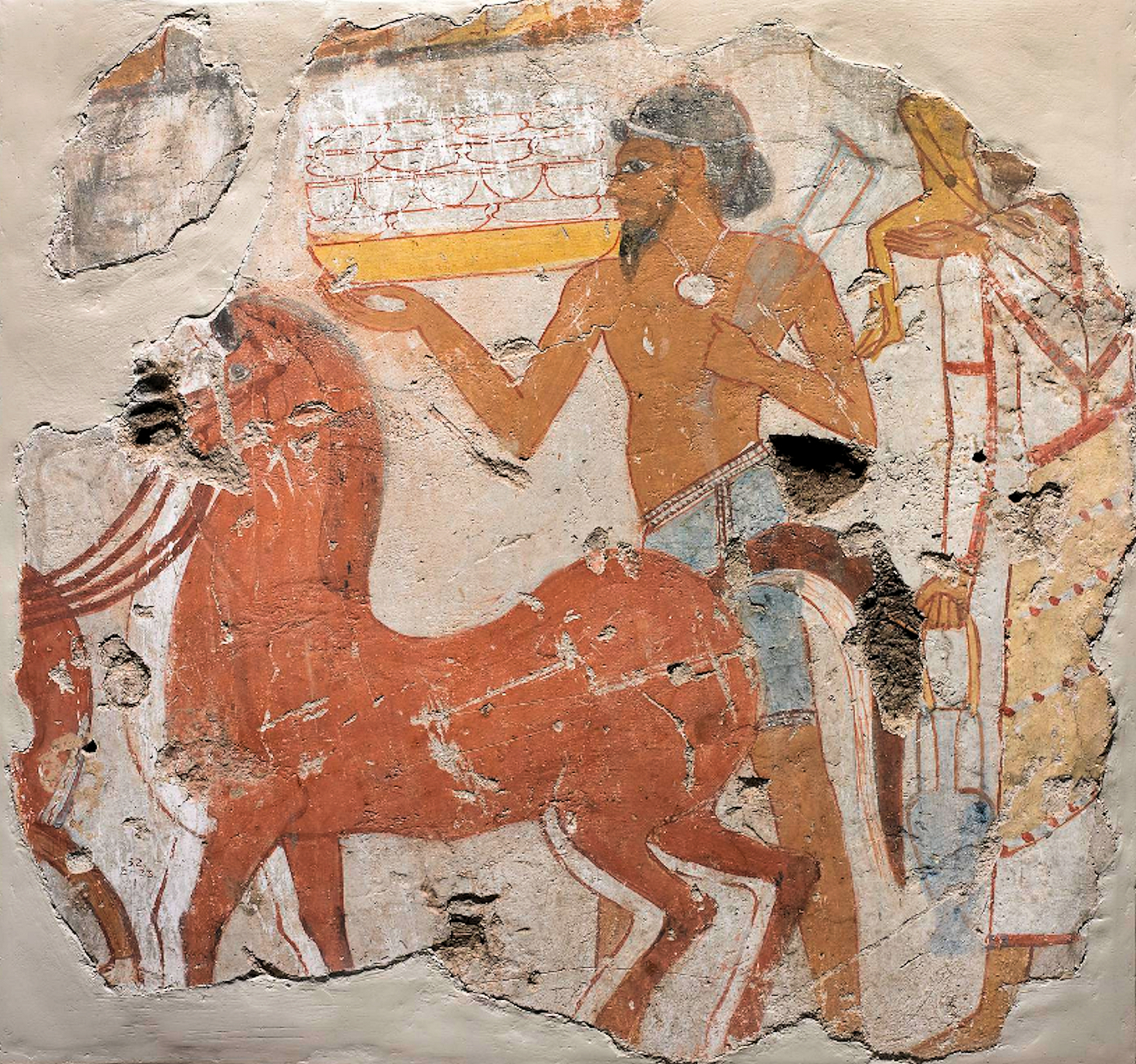
A painting probably from TT63 depicting an Asiatic tribute-bearer.

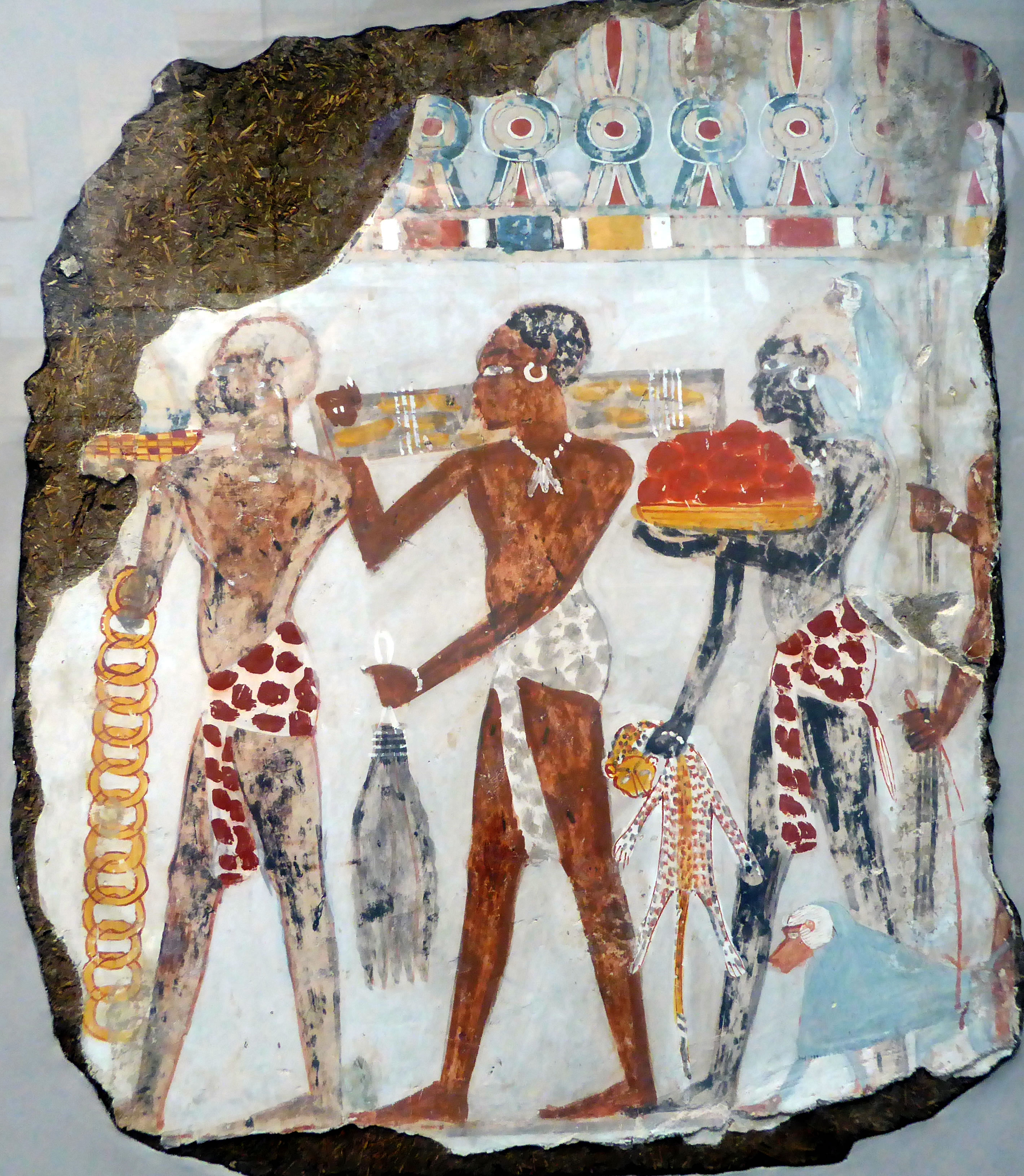
A painting from TT63 depicting Nubians bearing tribute.

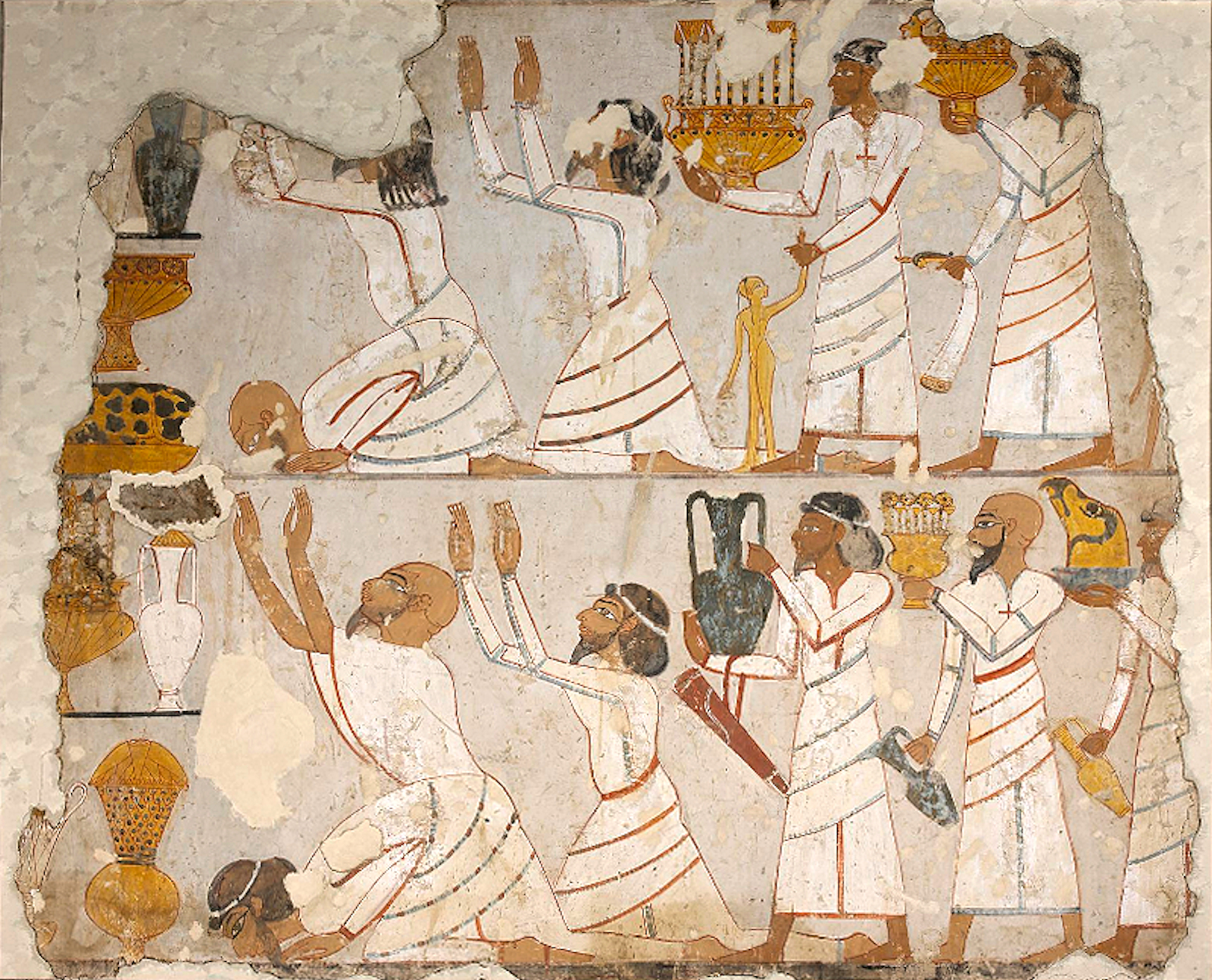
West Asiatic tribute bearers depicted on a fragment of a painting from TT63.

== See also ==
- List of Theban tombs
