= Sheikh Abd el-Qurna cache =

Ancient Egyptian tomb

Theban tomb Sheikh Abd el-Qurna cache
- Burial site of Royal Cache
- Location: Sheikh Abd el-Qurna, Theban Necropolis
- Discovered: 1857
- Excavated by: Alexander Henry Rhind

The Sheikh Abd el-Qurna cache was discovered in 1857 by Alexander Henry Rhind. The tomb is located at the foothills of Sheikh Abd el-Qurna, near TT131. It had been sealed with a wall carrying the seal of Pharaoh Amenhotep III. The tomb contained bones, bandages and several disturbed mummies. It also contained several wooden labels with inscriptions mentioning several royal women.

The label for Princess Nebetia has an inscription mentioning year 27. This is thought to refer to year 27 of Psusennes I during which the princesses may have been reburied.

Name	Title	Comments
Nebetia	King's daughter	Daughter of the King's Son Si-Atum
Tiaa	King's Daughter of Menkheperure (Tuthmosis IV) of the House of the Royal Children	Daughter of Tuthmosis IV
Tatau (Tawy?)	King's Daughter of the House of the King's Children	The beginning of the name is damaged.
Py-ihia	King's Daughter of Menkheperure (Tuthmosis IV)	Two labels refer to this daughter of Tuthmosis IV
Pypuy-Tasherit	King's daughter	Said to be daughter of Iuy; Three labels; only one of the labels mentions Iuy
Henut-iunu	King's daughter	Two labels were found.
Ptah-meryt	King's daughter	
Sat-Hori	King's daughter	
Neferuamen	King's Daughter	
Wiay	King's Daughter	
Amenemopet	King's Daughter	Probably a daughter of Tuthmosis IV
