= Henutempet =

Ancient Egyptian princess

- The Noble Lady of Mitanni
- Spouse: Thutmose IV (possibly)
Name in Hieroglyph
W10 X1 Aa15 N1
- Transcription: ḥnw.t-m-p.t
- Dynasty: 18th Dynasty

Henutempet was a Mitanni princess who married into the Egyptian royal family, and she was likely the Mitanni wife of Thutmose IV.

== Life ==
Two funerary cone inscriptions belong respectively to "the steward of the Noble Lady of Mitanni, Bengay" and "the steward of Henutempet, Bengay." As these two cones are attributed to the same individual, the name of the "Noble Lady of Mitanni" is accordingly identified as Henutempet. According to van Dijk, the title "Noble Lady of Mitanni" would have held specific referential force only when there was but one such princess in Egypt; it should therefore designate the first Mitanni princess to have married into Egypt, namely the wife of Thutmose IV. Betrò adduces several lines of evidence in support of this theory and notes that the name Bengay is foreign, probably of Semitic origin.

Henutempet's husband, Thutmose IV, was the first Egyptian pharaoh to marry a Mitanni princess. Following the end of the long-standing hostility between Egypt and Mitanni, he initiated correspondence in an attempt to establish contact—an event recorded in the Amarna letters. On that occasion, Tushratta, king of Mitanni, wrote to Akhenaten as follows:

When [Menkheperure], the father of Nimmureya (i.e., Amenhotep III) wrote to Artatama, my grandfather, he asked for the daughter of my grandfather, the sister of my father. He wrote 5, 6 times, but he did not give her. When he wrote my grandfather 7 times, then only under such pressure, did he give her. (EA 29)

Her original Mitanni name remains unknown, the name Henutempet was likely bestowed upon her after her arrival in Egypt.

== Burial ==
Van Dijk proposed that the coffin unearthed in the Deir el-Bahri royal cache (TT 320) belongs to the Mitanni noblewoman Henutempet. However, other scholars maintain that the owner of this coffin is in fact Ahmose-Henutempet of the Seventeenth Dynasty.
