= Tiaa (princess) =

Daughter of Thutmose IV

- King's Daughter
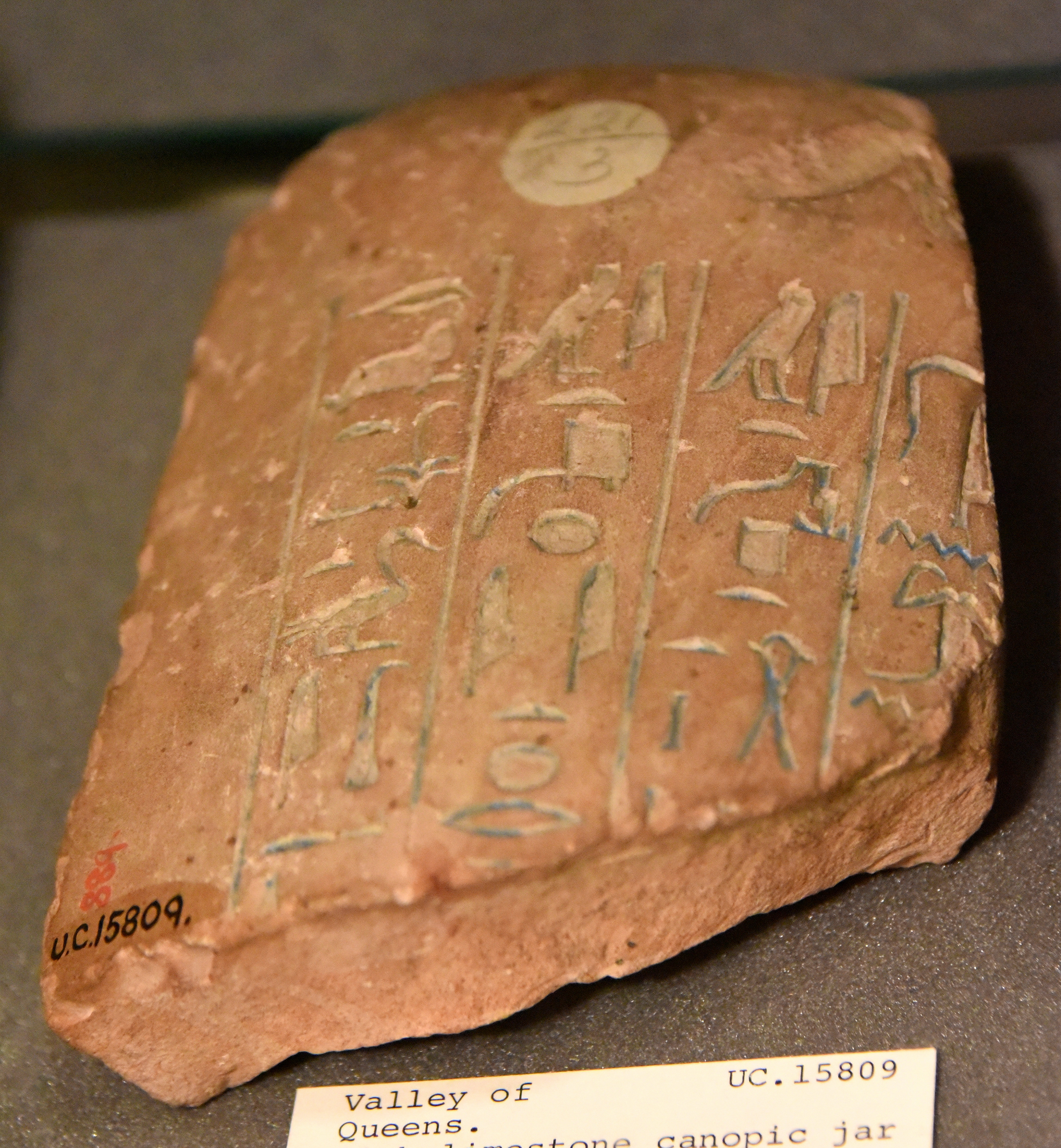
- Fragment of a canopic jar of Tiaa, the King's daughter. 18th Dynasty. Pink limestone. From the Valley of the Queens at Thebes, Egypt. The Petrie Museum of Egyptian Archaeology, London
- Burial: Reburied in Sheikh Abd el-Qurna cache
Egyptian name
ti O29V B1
- Dynasty: 18th Dynasty
- Father: Thutmose IV

Tiaa was an Ancient Egyptian princess of the 18th Dynasty. She was the daughter of Pharaoh Thutmose IV and was named after her paternal grandmother Tiaa.

It is likely that she is the princess shown in the tomb of Sobekhotep (TT63), whose wife Meryt was her nurse. Canopic jars that probably belong to her were found in the Valley of the Queens.

She died during the reign of her brother Amenhotep III. Her original burial place is not known. Her mummy was reburied during the 21st Dynasty in the Sheikh Abd el-Qurna cache, along with the mummies of several other royal princesses: Amenemopet and Petepihu, who were probably her sisters; Nebetia, her niece, and princesses Tatau, Henutiunu, Meritptah, Sithori and Wiay. Her mummy label identifies her as King's Daughter of Menkheperure. The tomb was discovered in 1857.
