= Tentamun (18th dynasty) =

Daughter of Thutmose IV

U33 n t i mn n B1
- Died: c. 1391 BC
- Parent: Thutmose IV

Tentamun (died c. 1391 BC) was an ancient Egyptian princess of the 18th Dynasty during the New Kingdom. She was a daughter of Thutmose IV.

Tentamun died in the same year as her father. She was buried in the Valley of the Kings in tomb KV43 together with her father and with a brother called Amenemhat. A fragment of a canopic jar belonging to Tentamun was found in the tomb. The fragment is now in the Egyptian Museum in Cairo.
