= Sobekhotep (New Kingdom treasurer) =

Ancient Egyptian treasurer

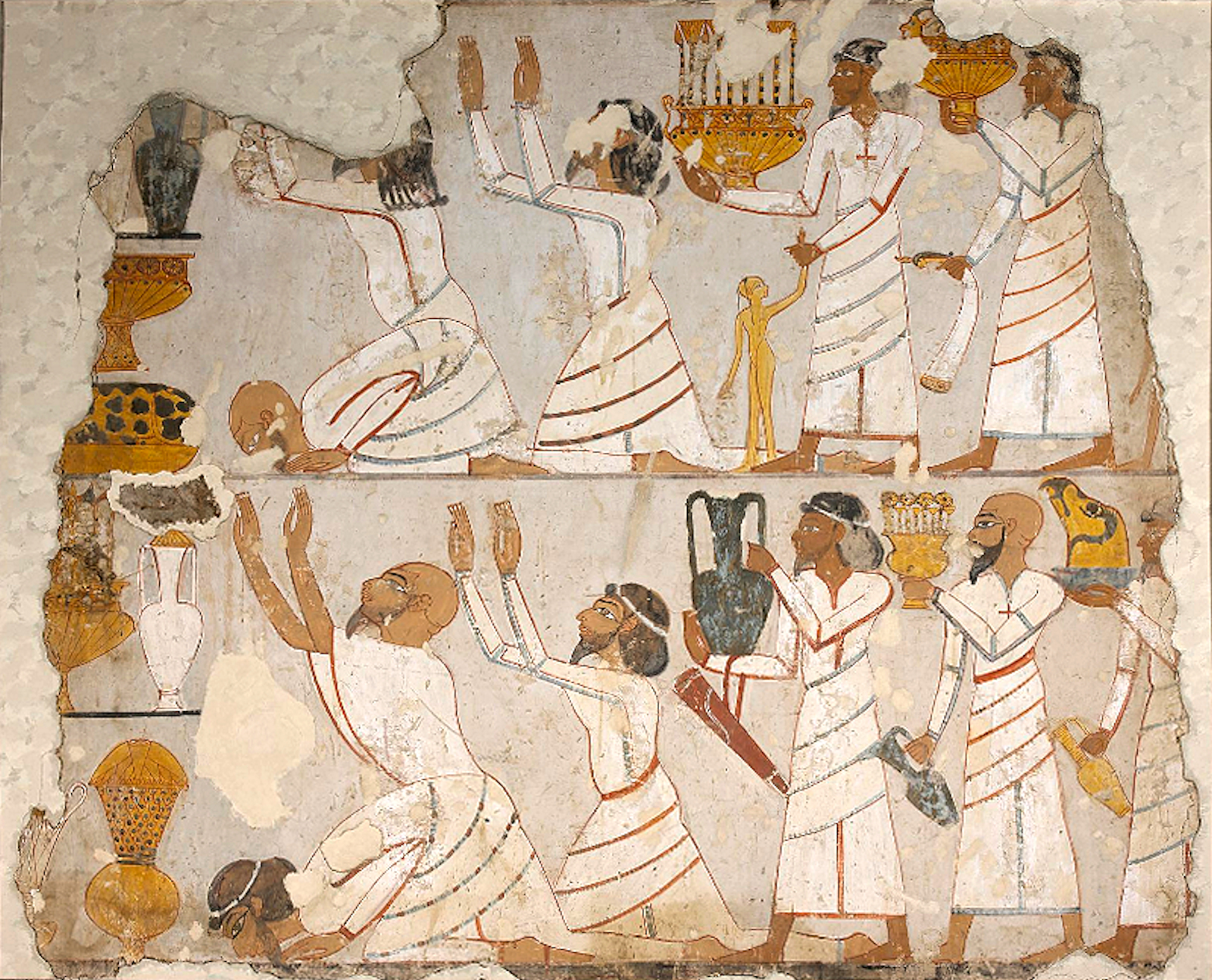
West Asiatic tribute bearers in the tomb of Sobekhotep, circa 1400 BC, Thebes. British Museum

Sobekhotep was an important ancient Egyptian courtier of the New Kingdom circa 1400 BCE, most likely in office under King Thutmosis IV.

Sobekhotep was treasurer, but also mayor of Shedet, the capital of the Fayum. The latter title he was holding before being appointed to become a treasurer. Sobekhotep was the son of the treasurer Min and followed him most likely directly in his office. Sobekhotep is mainly known for his Theban tomb TT63. His wife Meryt was the nurse of the king's daughter Tiaa. Her father is not known for sure, she either was the daughter of the mayor of the Faiyum Kapus or the daughter of another Sobekhotep who was also mayor of Shedet. His son was called Paser and was also mayor of Shedet. Otherwise, not much is known about him. He appears on a legal document that mentions also the Hathor temple at Gebelein and he is known from a statue.

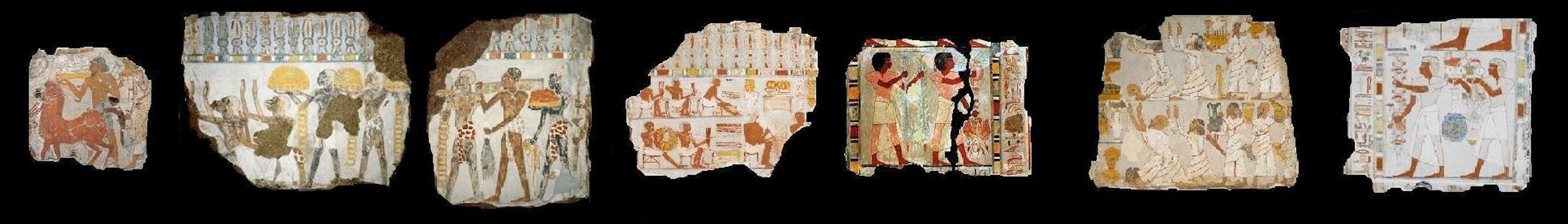
Known paintings from the tomb of Sobekhotep (TT63)

== Bibliography ==
- Helck, Wolfgang (1958). Zur Verwaltung des Mittleren und Neuen Reichs. Leiden, Cologne: Brill.
- Bryan, Betsy (1990). "The Tomb owner and his family". In Dziobek, Eberhard Dziobek; Abd El-Raziq, Mahmud (eds.). Das Grab des Sobekhotep: Theben Nr. 63. New York: von Zabern. ISBN 3805309740.
- Zecchi, Marco (2010). Sobek of Shedet, The Crocodile God in the Fayyum in the Dynastic Period. Todi. ISBN 9788862441155.
- Wolfram Grajetzki (2001). Two Treasurers of the Late Middle Kingdom.
