= Pyhia =

Daughter of Thutmose IV

- King's Daughter
- Burial: Reburied in Sheikh Abd el-Qurna cache
Egyptian name
p Z4 E1 Z2 i A B1
- Dynasty: 18th Dynasty
- Father: Thutmose IV

Pyhia or Pyihia or Petepihu (Ancient Egyptian: p3-ỉḥỉ3) was an Ancient Egyptian princess during the 18th Dynasty, a daughter of Thutmose IV.

Her mummy was reburied in the Sheikh Abd el-Qurna cache along with that of several other princesses: her probable sisters Amenemopet and Tiaa; her niece Nebetia and Princesses Tatau, Henutiunu, Merytptah, Sithori and Wiay. The tomb was discovered in 1857.

== Sources ==
- Dodson, Aidan; Hilton, Dylan (2004). The Complete Royal Families of Ancient Egypt. London: Thames & Hudson. ISBN 0-500-05128-3.
- Dodson, Aidan; Janssen, Jac. J. (1989). "A Theban Tomb and Its Tenants". The Journal of Egyptian Archaeology. 75: 125–138. doi:10.2307/3821904. JSTOR 3821904.
