= Min (treasurer) =

Min was an important Ancient Egyptian courtier of the New Kingdom in office under king Thutmosis III.

Min was treasurer. Min was the father of the treasurer Sobekhotep and is known from a number of monuments. He is mentioned in the tomb of his son and on one of the statues of the latter. At Gebel el-Silsila Min had a chapel, as many officials of the New Kingdom had. Min had most likely a tomb at Thebes, that is not yet identified. However, there are funerary cones with his name coming from Thebes that seem to prove that he had a tomb there. Funerary cones adorned Theban tomb chapels.

== Bibliography ==
- Helck, Wolfgang (1957). Zur Verwaltung des Mittleren und Neuen Reichs. Leiden, Cologne: Brill.
