= Nebetia =

- King's Daughter
- Burial: Reburied in Sheikh Abd el-Qurna cache
Egyptian name
nb t i A
- Dynasty: 18th Dynasty
- Father: Siatum

Nebetia was an ancient Egyptian princess of the 18th Dynasty. She was the granddaughter of Pharaoh Thutmose IV and the daughter of Prince Siatum. She is one of the few examples of a pharaoh's granddaughter bearing the title of King's Daughter – the ancient Egyptian equivalent of "princess" – which normally belonged only to women whose fathers actually ruled.

The mummy-label, which states her title and the name of her father is one of only two sources Siatum's existence. The label was found in the Sheikh Abd el-Qurna cache. Nebetia's mummy – along with several others – had been reburied during the 21st Dynasty, but the tomb was robbed before its discovery in 1857.

== Sources ==
- Aidan Dodson & Dyan Hilton, The Complete Royal Families of Ancient Egypt, Thames & Hudson (2004), p. 137, 140. ISBN 0-500-05128-3
