= Thutmose IV =

Egyptian Pharaoh

- Tuthmosis IV
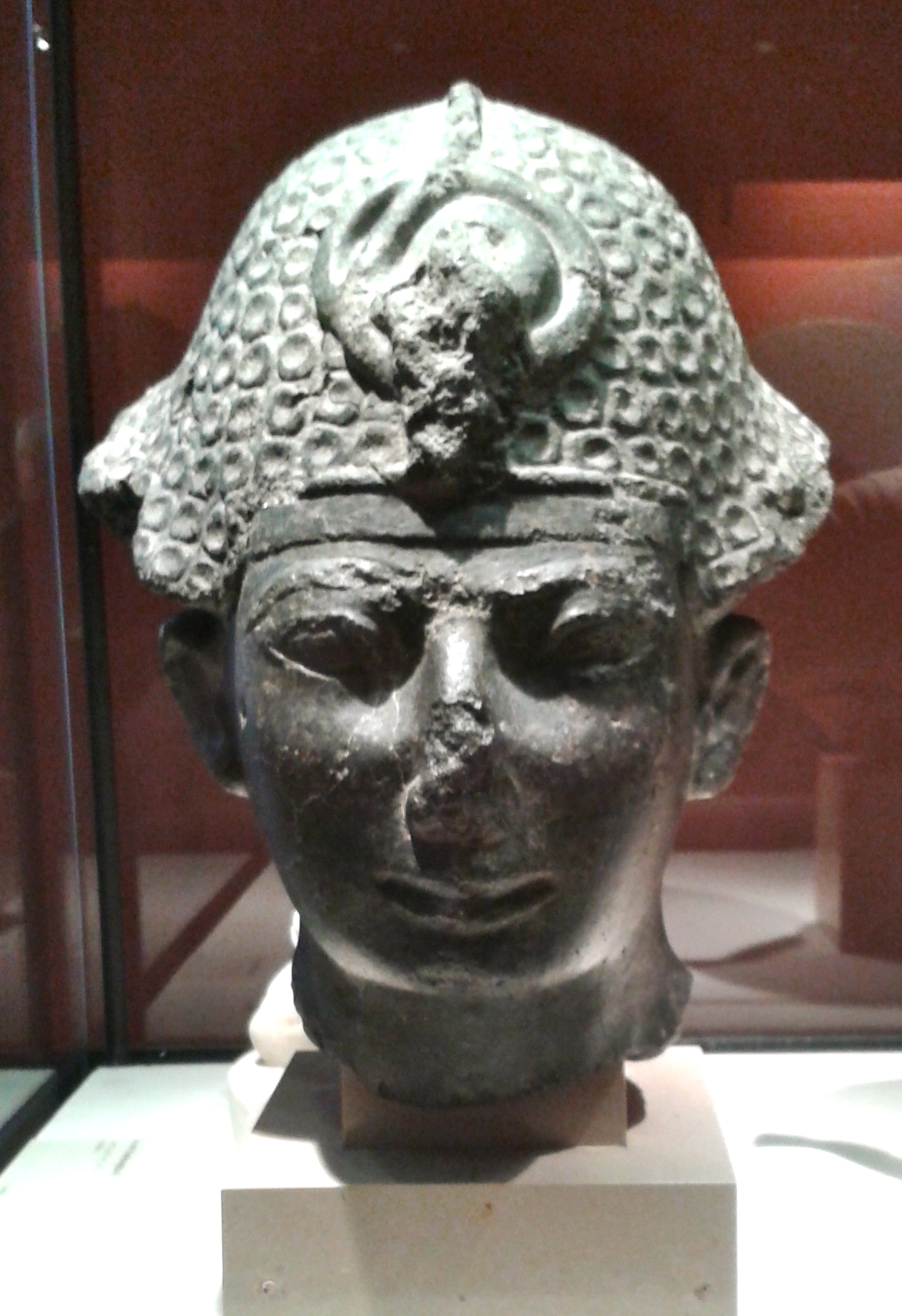
- Thutmose IV wearing the khepresh, Musée du Louvre

Pharaoh
- Reign: c. 1401 - c. 1391 BC
- Predecessor: Amenhotep II
- Successor: Amenhotep III
Royal titulary
Horus name
Ka nakht tut khau
Kꜣ nḫt twt ḫˁw
Victorious bull, the (very) image of appearances
G5	E1 D40 t w t N28 Z2
Nebty name
Djed nesyt mi itemu
Ḏd-nsyt mi itmw
Stable of kingship like Atum
G16	Dd Dd sw t i i mi t U15
Golden Horus
Weser khepesh, der pedjut 9
Wsr ḫpš dr pḏwt 9
The one great of strength who has repelled the Nine Bows
G8	wsr s T16 d r D40 pD Z2 Z2 Z2
Prenomen
Men kheperu re
Mn ḫprw rˁ
The established one of the manifestations of Re

M23 X1 L2 X1	ra mn xpr Z2
Nomen
Djehuty mes(u)
Ḏḥwty ms(w)
Thoth is born

G39 N5	G26 ms s
- Consorts: Nefertari, Iaret, and Mutemwiya
- Children: Amenhotep III; Tentamun; Tiaa; Pyhia; Amenemhat
- Father: Amenhotep II
- Mother: Tiaa
- Born: c. 1420 BC
- Died: c. 1391 BC (aged c. 29)
- Burial: KV43; Mummy found in the KV35 royal cache (Theban Necropolis)
- Dynasty: 18th Dynasty of Egypt

Thutmose IV (also written as Thutmosis, Tuthmosis, or Thothmes in older history works in Latinized Greek; Ancient Egyptian: ḏḥwti.ms(.w) "Born of Thoth" c. 1420 BC - c. 1391 BC) was the eighth Pharaoh of the 18th Dynasty of Egypt, who ruled during the 14th century BC. His prenomen or royal name, Menkheperure, means "Established in forms is Re." He was the son of Amenhotep II and Tiaa, and the grandfather of Akhenaten.

== Family and Life ==
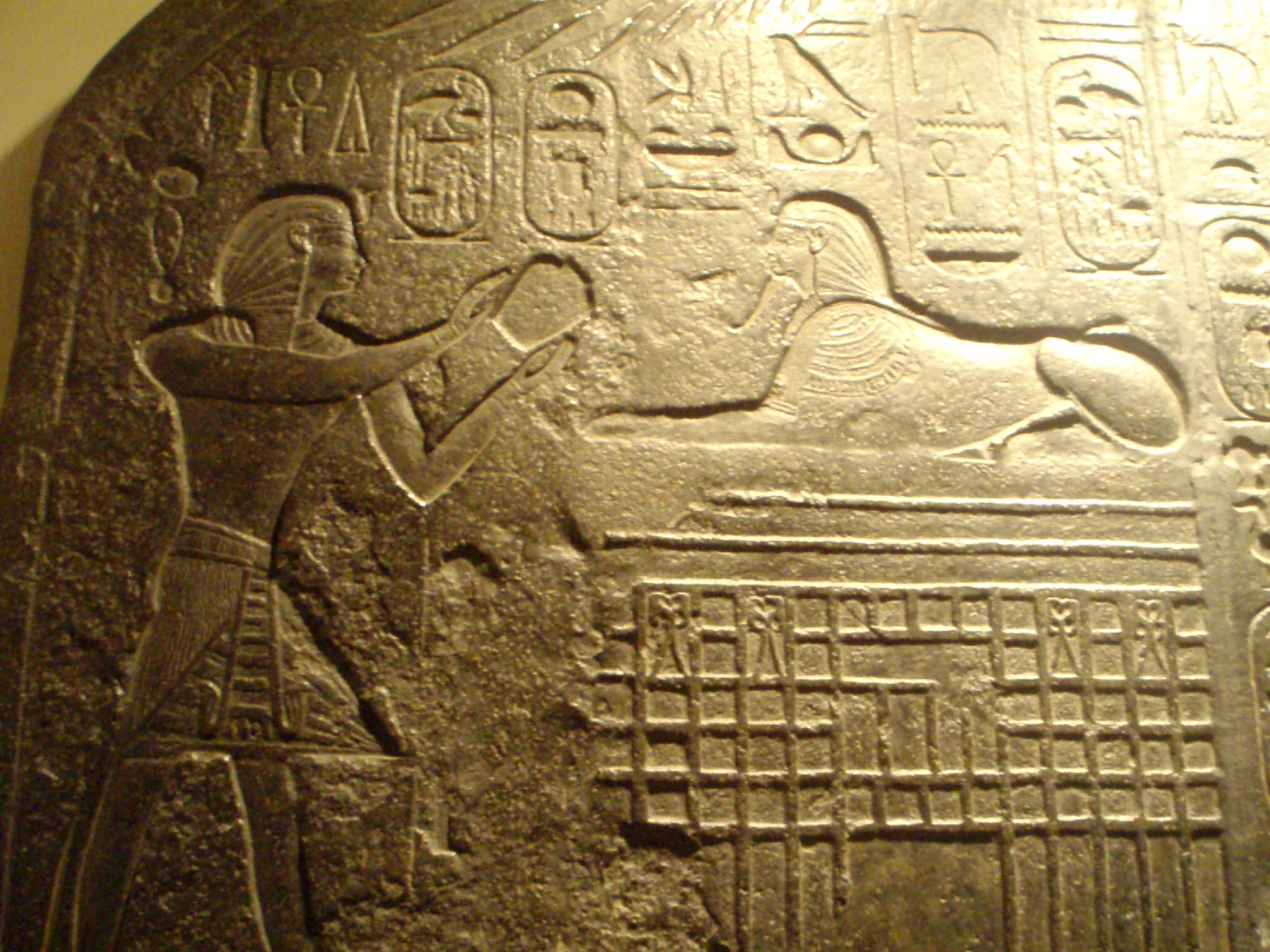
Close-up of a scene from the Dream Stele depicting Thutmose IV giving offerings to the Great Sphinx of Giza. From a full-sized reproduction on display at the Rosicrucian Egyptian Museum, San Jose.

Thutmose IV was born to Amenhotep II and Tiaa, but was not actually the crown prince and Amenhotep II's chosen successor to the throne. Some scholars speculate that Thutmose ousted his older brother in order to usurp power and then commissioned the Dream Stele in order to justify his unexpected kingship. Thutmose IV's most celebrated accomplishment was the restoration of the Great Sphinx of Giza and subsequent commission of the Dream Stele. According to Thutmose IV's account on the Dream Stele, while the young prince was out on a hunting trip, he stopped to rest under the head of the Sphinx, which was buried up to the neck in sand. He soon fell asleep and had a dream in which the Sphinx told him that if he cleared away the sand and restored it he would become the next pharaoh. After completing the restoration of the Sphinx, he placed a carved stone tablet, now known as the Dream Stele, between the two paws of the Sphinx. The Dream Stele was not the only inscription claiming Thutmose IV divine right to rule. Also on the Sphinx was an inscription detailing Thutmose IV as a child finding a stone in the shape of a divine falcon intended to solidify his rule. The restoration of the Sphinx, and the text of the Dream Stele would then be a piece of propaganda on Thutmose IV's part, meant to bestow legitimacy upon his unexpected kingship. The preserved text of the Dream Stele runs as follows:

Year I, third month of the first season, day 19, under the Majesty of Horus, the Mighty Bull, begetting radiance, (the Favourite) of the Two Goddesses, enduring in Kingship like Atum, the Golden Horus, Mighty of Sword, repelling the Nine Bows; the King of Upper and Lower Egypt, Men-kheperu-Ra, the Son of Ra, Thothmes IV, Shining in Diadems; beloved of (Amon), given life, stability and dominion, like Ra, for ever.

Live the Good God, the Son of Atum, Protector of Hor-akhty, Living Image of the All-Lord Sovereign, Begotten of Ra, Excellent Heir of Kheperi, beautiful of face like his father, who came forth equipped with the form of Horus upon him, a King who... favour with the Ennead of the Gods; who purifies Heliopolis, who satisfies Ra; who beautifies Memphis, who presents Truth to Atum, who offers it to Him who is South of his Wall (Ptah), who makes a monument by daily offering to the God who created all things, seeking benefits for the Gods of the South and the North, who builds their houses of limestone, who endows all their offerings, Son of Atum of His Body, Thothmes IV, Shining in Diadems like Ra, Heir of Horus upon His Throne, Men-kheperu-Ra, given life.

When His Majesty was a stripling, like Horus, the Youth in Khemmis, his beauty was like the Protector of His Father, he seemed like the God himself. The army rejoiced because of love for him, and he repeated the circuit of his might like the Son of Nut and all the princes and all the great ones...

Behold, he did a thing which gave him pleasure upon the highlands of the Memphite Nome, upon its southern and northern road shooting at a target with copper bolts, hunting lions and the small game of the desert, coursing in his chariot, his horses being swifter than the wind, together with two of his followers, while not a soul knew it.

Now, when his hour came for giving rest to his followers, it was always at the Setepet (Sanctuary of Hor-em-akhet), beside Seker in Rostaw, Rennutet in Iat-Ta-Mut(?)... in the desert (or necropolis), Mut of the Southern... (Neit?), Mistress of the Southern Wall. Sekhmet, presiding over the Mountain, the Splendid Place of the Beginning of Time, opposite the Lords of Kher-ahah (Babylon), the sacred road of the Gods to the Western Necropolis of Iwn (Heliopolis).

Now, the very great statue of Kheperi rests in this place the great in power, the splendid in strength, upon which the shadow of Ra tarries. The quarters of Memphis, and all the cities which are by him come to him, raising their hands for him in praise to his face, bearing oblations for his Ka.

One of those days it came to pass that the King's Son Thothmes came, coursing at the time of mid-day, and he rested in the shadow of this Great God. Sleep seized him at the hour when the sun was in its zenith, and he found the Majesty of this Revered God speaking with his own mouth, as a father speaks with his son, saying: 'Behold thou me, my son, Thothmes. I am thy father, Hor-em-akhet-Kheperi-Ra-Atum; I will give to thee my Kingdom upon earth at the head of the living. Thou shalt wear the White Crown and the Red Crown upon the Throne of Geb, the Hereditary Prince. The land shall be thine, in its length and in its breath, that which the eye of the All-Lord shines upon. The food of the Two Lands shall be thine, the great tribute of all countries, the duration of a long period of years. My face is directed to you, my heart is to you; Thou shalt be to me the protector of my affairs, because I am ailing in all my limbs. The sands of the Sanctuary, upon which I am, have reached me; turn to me in order to do what I desire. I know that thou art my son, my protector; behold; I am with thee, I am thy leader.'

When he finished this speech, the King's Son awoke, hearing this..., he understood the words of the God, and he put them in his heart. He said: 'Come, let us hasten to our houses in the city; they shall protect the oblations for this God which we bring for him (or that we shall protect... and that we may bring): oxen... and all young vegetables; and we shall give praise to Wennefer... Khafra, the statue made for Atum-Hor-em-akhet...'

The rest of the text likely gave Thutmose IV's response and an affirmation of the works carried out.

=== Children with Mutemwiya ===
- Amenhotep III (c. 1400 - c. 1353 BC)

=== Children with unknown spouse(s) ===
- Tentamun (died c. 1391 BC)
- Tiaa (died c. 1370 BC)
- Pyhia
- Amenemhat

== Military accomplishments ==
Little is known about his rule. He suppressed a minor uprising in Nubia in his 8th year (attested in his Konosso stela) around 1393 BC and was referred to in a stela as the Conqueror of Syria, but little else has been pieced together about his military exploits. It is theorized that during Thutmose IV's reign a shift in chariot wheel technology began. Betsy Bryan, who penned a biography of Thutmose IV, says that Thutmose IV's Konosso stela appears to refer to a minor desert patrol action on the part of the king's forces to protect certain gold-mine routes in Egypt's Eastern Desert from occasional attacks by the Nubians.

== Diplomatic relations ==
Thutmose IV's rule is significant because he established peaceful relations with Mitanni and married a Mitannian princess to seal this new alliance. Some have suggested that she would go on to become his principal consort, Queen Mutemwiya. However, this theory can be refuted by chronology alone: the Mitanni princess married Thutmose IV during his reign, but Mutemwiya gave birth to the future successor Amenhotep III before Thutmose IV even ascended to the throne as pharaoh. This sequence of events creates a clear temporal contradiction, as Mutemwiya must have been a consort of Thutmose IV before his official reign began, whereas the Mitanni marriage was a diplomatic event that occurred later, during his rule. Therefore, they cannot be the same person. This Mitannian princess might have been Henutempet, who could have held the title of The Noble Lady of Mitanni. Thutmose IV's role in initiating contact with Egypt's former rival, Mitanni, is documented by Amarna letter EA 29 composed decades later by Tushratta, a Mittanian king who ruled during the reign of Akhenaten, Thutmose IV's grandson. Tushratta states to Akhenaten that:

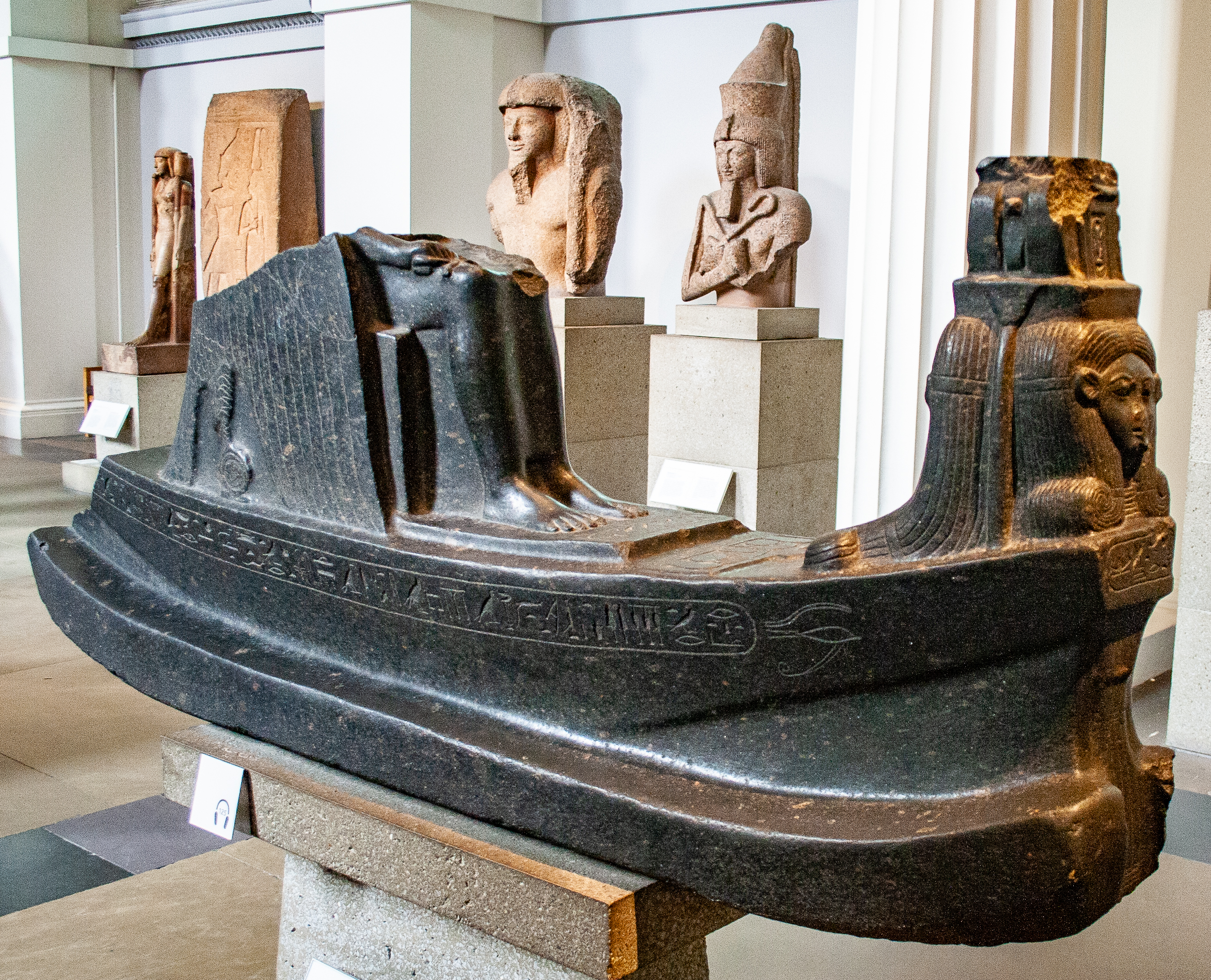
Sculpture of the Sacred Boat of Mutemwia, from Thebes temple of Karnak. Currently housed in the British museum.

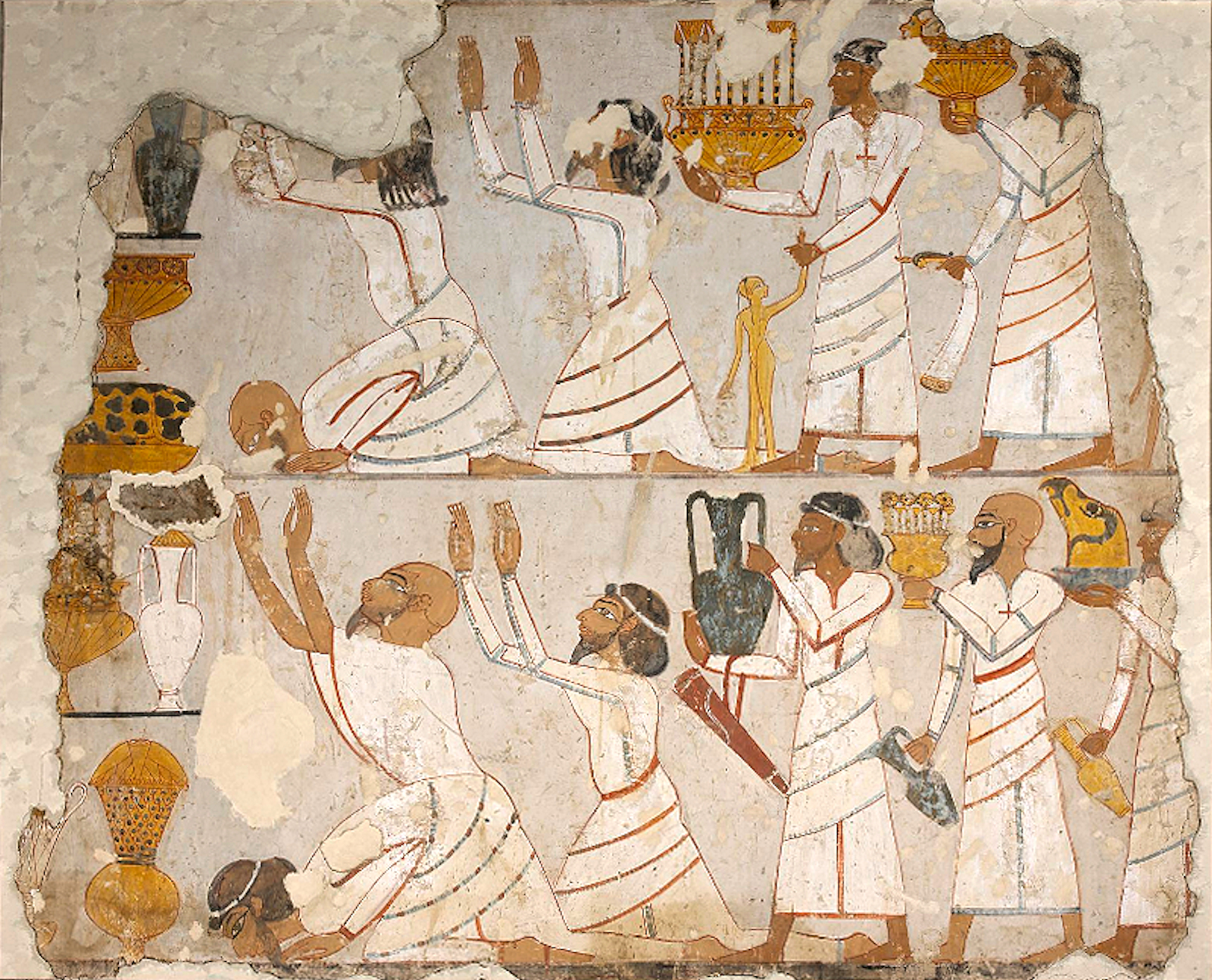
Syrian ("Retjenu") tribute bearers in the tomb of Sobekhotep, during the reign of Thutmose IV, Thebes. British Museum.

When [Menkheperure], the father of Nimmureya (i.e., Amenhotep III) wrote to Artatama, my grandfather, he asked for the daughter of my grandfather, the sister of my father. He wrote 5, 6 times, but he did not give her. When he wrote my grandfather 7 times, then only under such pressure, did he give her. (EA 29)

== Dates and length of reign ==
Dating the beginning of the reign of Thutmose IV is difficult to do with certainty because he is several generations removed from the astronomical dates which are usually used to calculate Egyptian chronologies, and the debate over the proper interpretation of these observances has not been settled. Thutmose's grandfather Thutmose III almost certainly acceded the throne in either 1504 or 1479 BC, based upon two lunar observances during his reign, and ruled for nearly 54 years. His successor Amenhotep II, Thutmose IV's father, took the throne and ruled for around 24 years but has been assigned up to 35 years in some chronological reconstructions. The currently preferred reconstruction, after analyzing all this evidence, usually comes to an accession date around 1401 BC or 1400 BC for the beginning of Thutmose IV's reign. The length of his reign is not clear. He is usually given about nine or ten years of reign. Manetho credits him with a reign of 9 years and 8 months. However, Manetho's other figures for the 18th Dynasty are frequently assigned to the wrong kings or simply incorrect, so monumental evidence is also used to determine his reign length. Of all of Thutmose IV's dated monuments, three date to his first regnal year, one to his fourth, possibly one to his fifth, one to his sixth, two to his seventh, and one to his eighth. Two other dated objects, one dated to a Year 19 and another year 20, have been suggested as possibly belonging to him, but neither have been accepted as dating to his reign. The readings of the king's name in these dates are today accepted as referring to the prenomen of Thutmose III—Menkheperre—and not Menkhepe[ru]re Thutmose IV himself. Due to the absence of higher dates for Thutmose IV after his Year 8 Konosso stela, Manetho's figures here are usually accepted. There were once chronological reconstructions which gave him a reign as long as 34–35 years. Today, however, most scholars ascribe him a 10-year reign from around 1401 to 1391 BC, within a small margin of error.

== Monuments ==
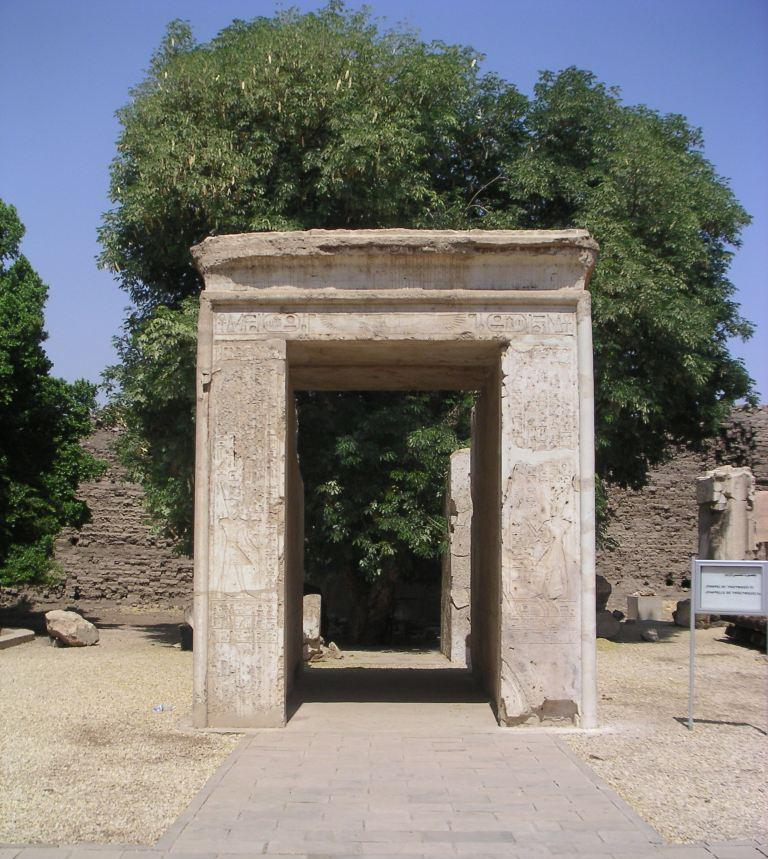
The entrance of Thutmose IV's Karnak chapel

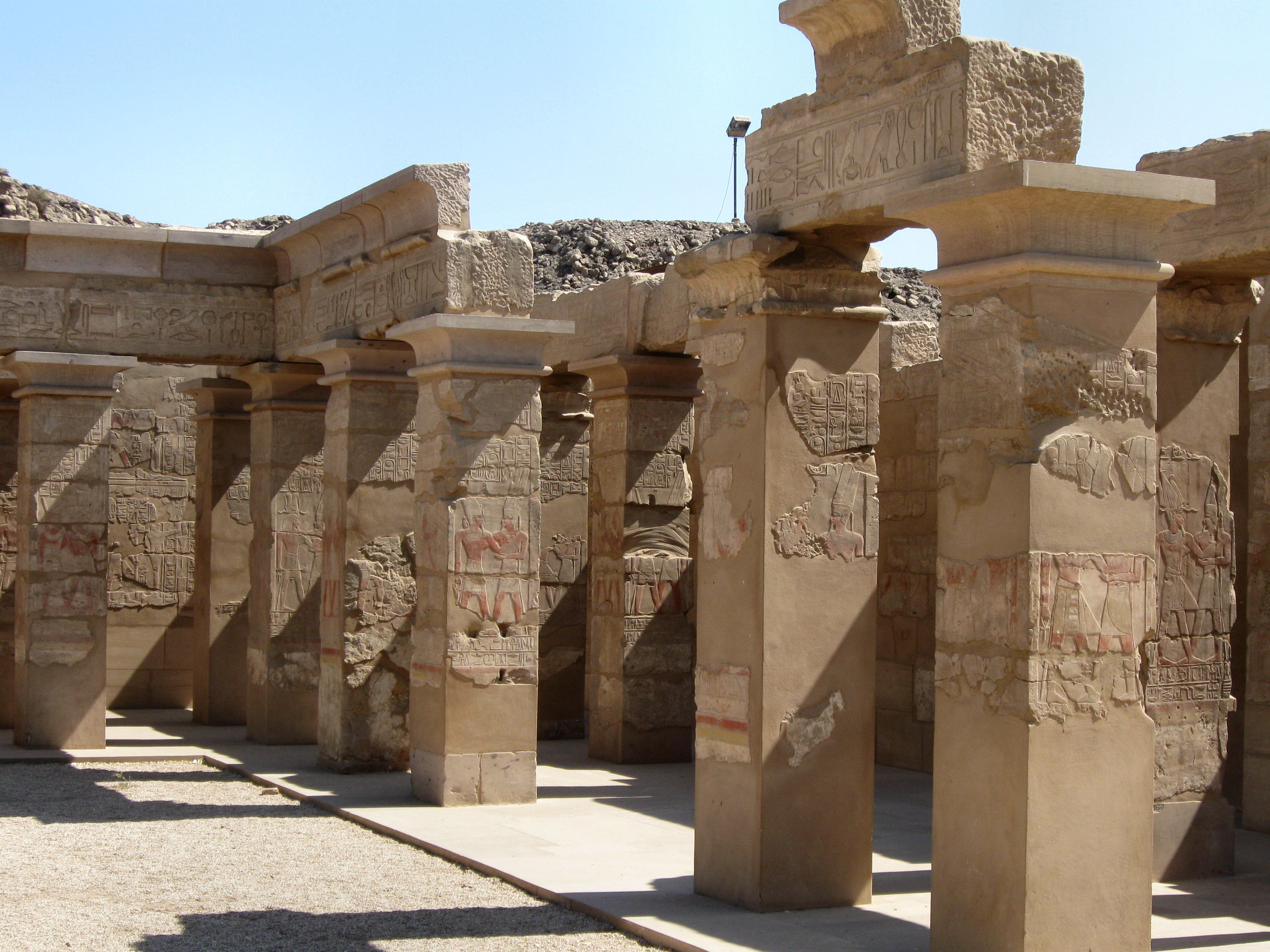
Thutmose IV's peristyle hall at Karnak

Like most of the Thutmoside kings, he built on a grand scale. Thutmose IV completed the eastern obelisk at the Temple of Karnak started by Thutmose III, which, at 32 meters (105 ft), was the tallest obelisk ever erected in Egypt. Thutmose IV called it the tekhen waty or 'unique obelisk.' It was transported to the grounds of the Circus Maximus in Rome by Emperor Constantius II in 357 and, later, "re-erected by Pope Sixtus V in 1588 at the Piazza San Giovanni" where it is today known as the Lateran Obelisk.

Thutmose IV also built a unique chapel and peristyle hall against the back or eastern walls of the main Karnak temple building. The chapel was intended for people "who had no right of access to the main [Karnak] temple. It was a 'place of the ear' for the god Amun where the god could hear the prayers of the townspeople." This small alabaster chapel and peristyle hall of Thutmose IV has today been carefully restored by French scholars from the Centre Franco-Egyptien D'Étude des Temple de Karnak (CFEETK) mission in Karnak.

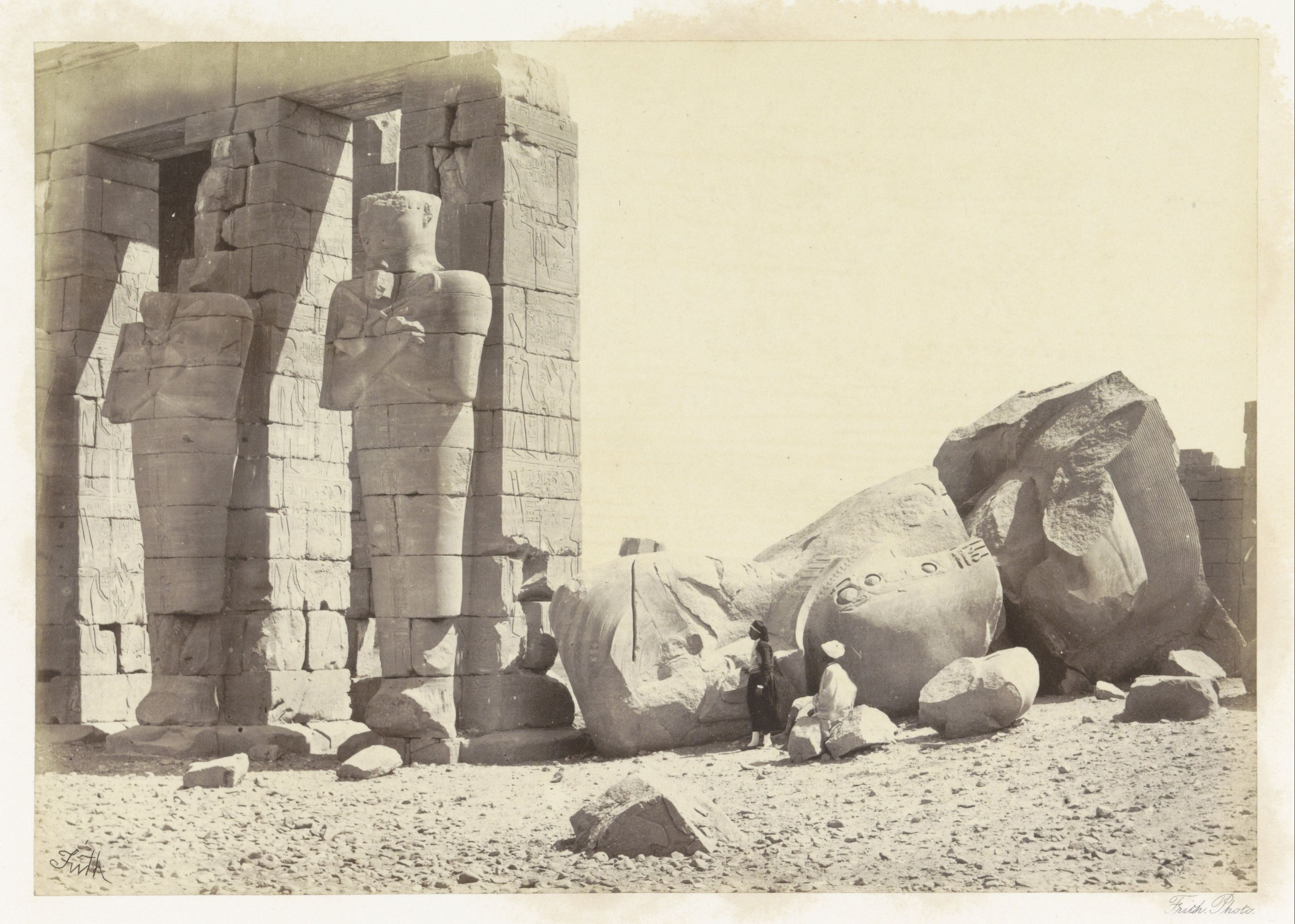
The Osiride pillars and fallen colossus some of which had been altered and used for Ramesses II by taking other works such as from Thutmose IV

Like many other Pharaohs, Thutmose IV commissioned many statues of himself. Some of which had been taken and altered by a later pharaoh by the name of Ramesses II. The Osiride Colossus originally commissioned by Thutmose had been recut to fit the needs of Ramesses II along with at least one bronze statue of Thutmose IV.

== Burial and mummy ==
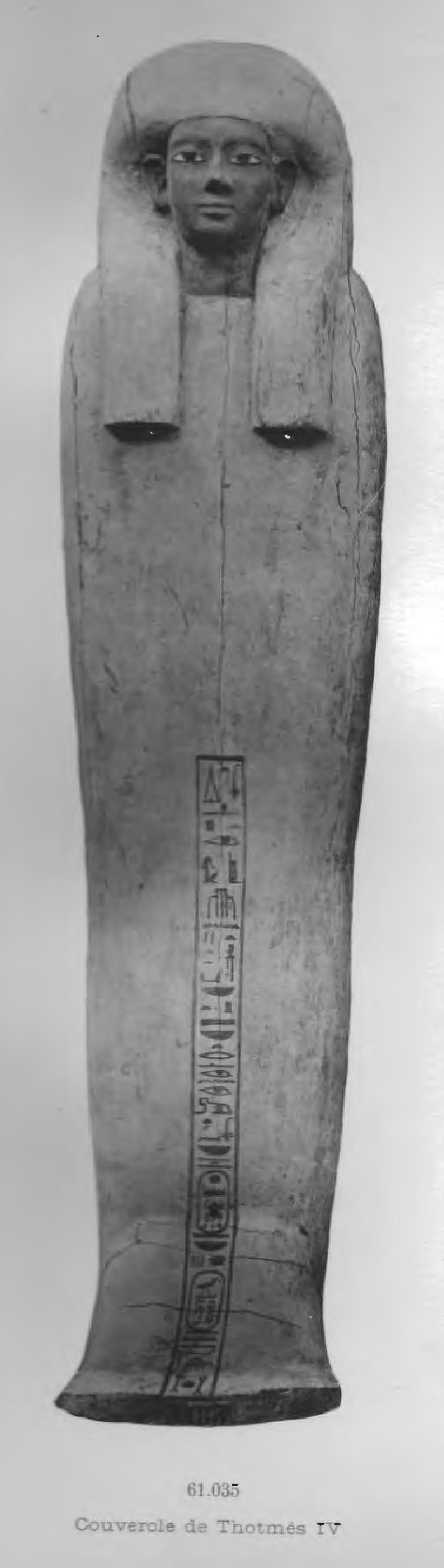
Coffin of Thutmose IV

Thutmose IV was buried in tomb KV43 in the Valley of the Kings, but his body wasn't found there. It appears the tomb was incomplete at the time of his death.

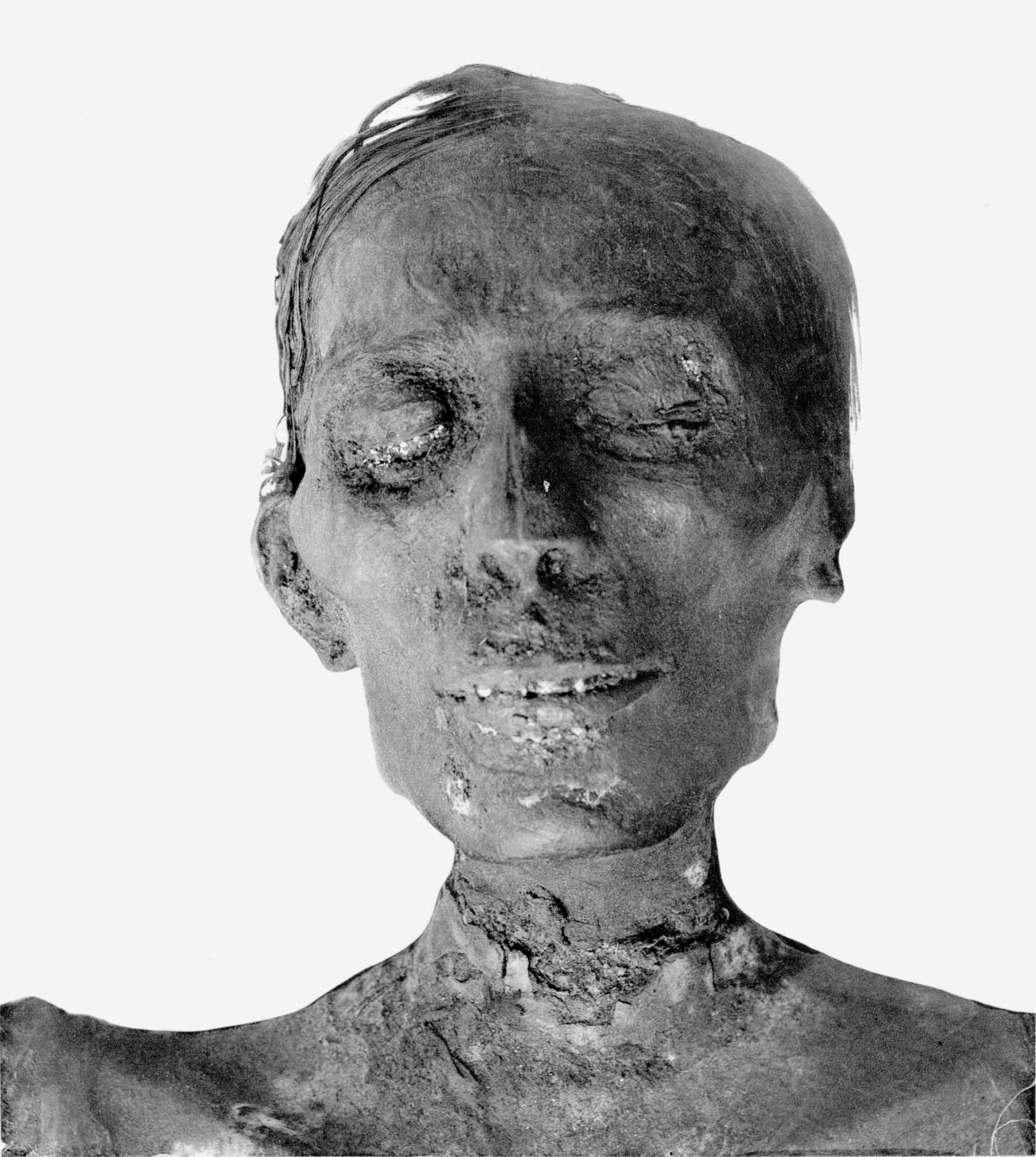
Thutmose IV's mummy

His body was later moved to the mummy cache in room Jb in KV35, where it was discovered by Victor Loret in 1898. An examination of his mummy conducted by Grafton Smith revealed that he was extremely emaciated at the time of his death. His height was given as 1.646 m (5 ft 4.8 in) but considering that the feet have been broken off post-mortem, his height in life would have been taller. The forearms are crossed over the chest, right over left. His hair, which is parted in the middle, is around 16 cm (6.3 in) long and dark reddish-brown. His ears are also pierced. Elliot Smith estimated his age to be 25–28 years or possibly older. He was succeeded to the throne by his son, Amenhotep III.

== Modern developments ==
In 1980, James Harris and Edward Wente conducted X-ray examinations of New Kingdom Pharaoh's crania and skeletal remains, which included the mummified remains of Thutmose IV. The authors noted royal mummies like Thutmose IV showed features characteristic of North Mediterranean populations, or the Western World.

In 2012, a surgeon at Imperial College London analysed the early death of Thutmose IV and the premature deaths of other Eighteenth Dynasty pharaohs (including Tutankhamun and Akhenaten). He concludes that their early deaths were likely as a result of a familial temporal epilepsy. This would account for both the untimely death of Thutmose IV and also his religious vision described on the Dream Stele, due to this type of epilepsy's association with intense spiritual visions and religiosity.

His mummy has the inventory number CG 61073. In April 2021 his mummy was moved from the Museum of Egyptian Antiquities to the National Museum of Egyptian Civilization along with those of 17 other kings and 4 queens in an event termed the Pharaohs' Golden Parade.

== Ancestry ==
Ancestors of Thutmose IV

Thutmose II
Thutmose III
Iset
Amenhotep II
Merytre-Hatshepsut
Thutmose IV
Tiaa

== Belongings gallery ==
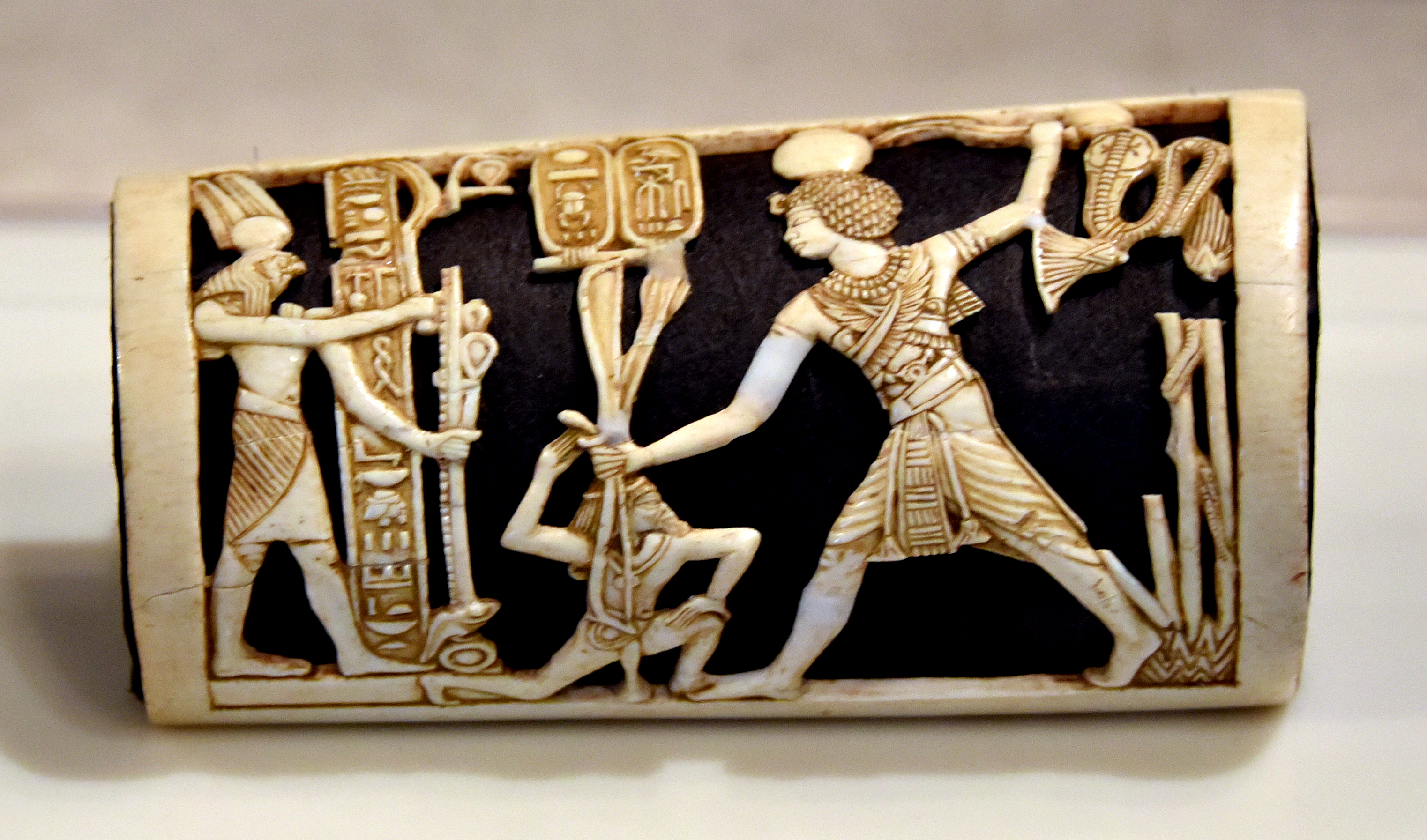
Bracer of Pharaoh Thutmose IV. From Amarna, House P 48.1, Egypt. 1397-1388 BC. Neues Museum, Berlin.

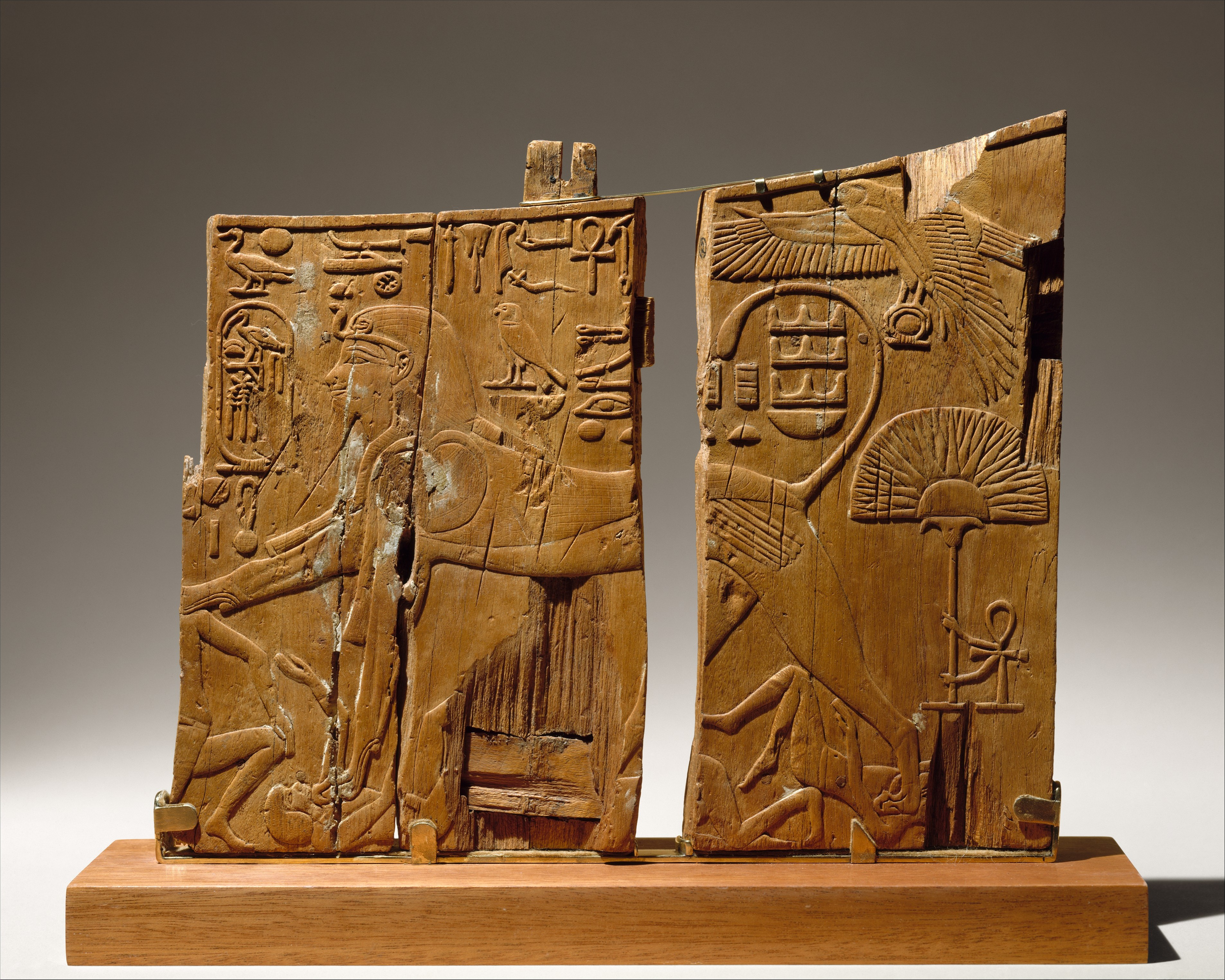
Arm Panel From a Ceremonial Chair of Thutmose IV. Likely used to demonstrate kingly power.

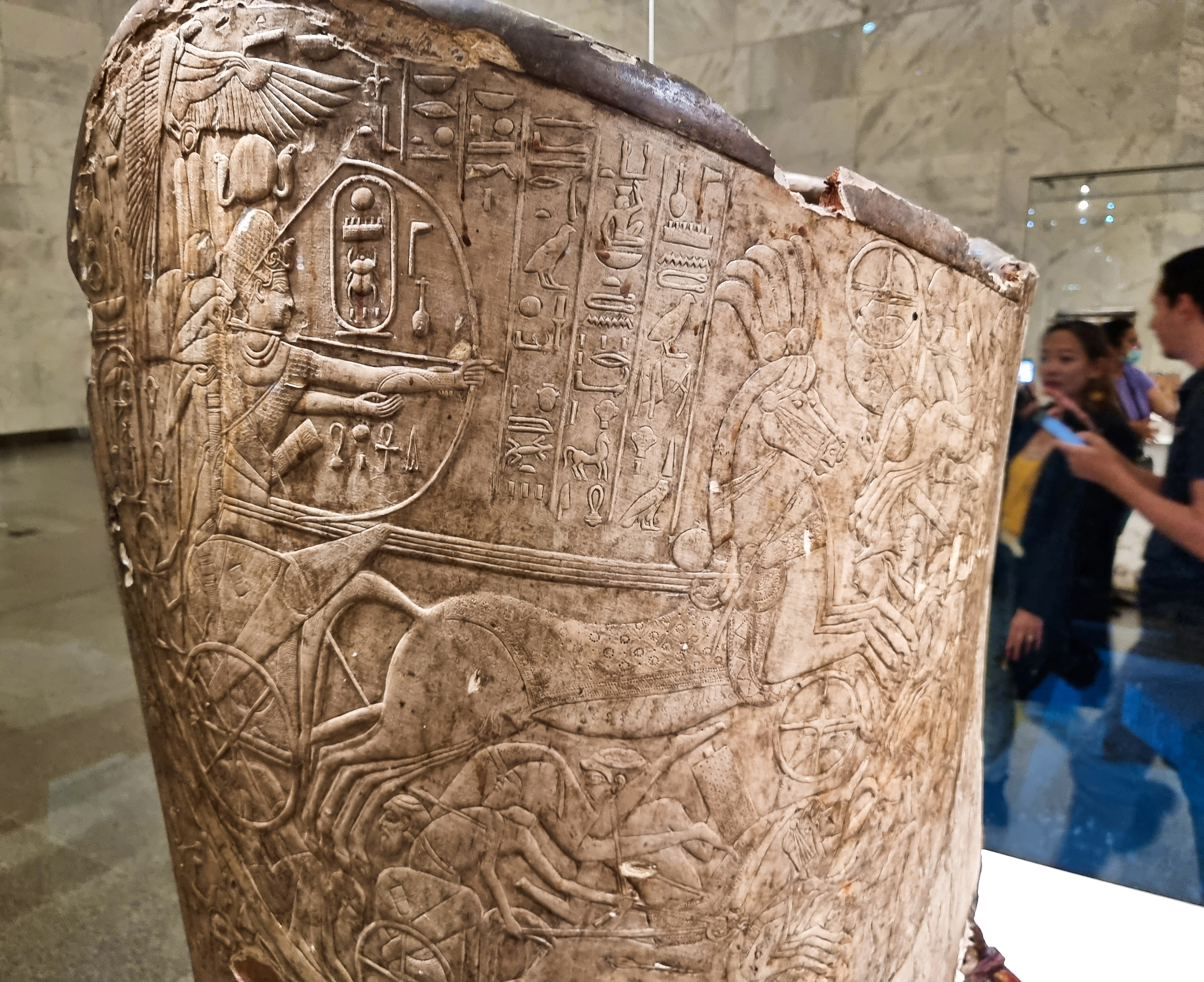
Front of the State Chariot of Thutmose IV. Likely used during Thutmose IV's desert patrols.

== Monument gallery ==
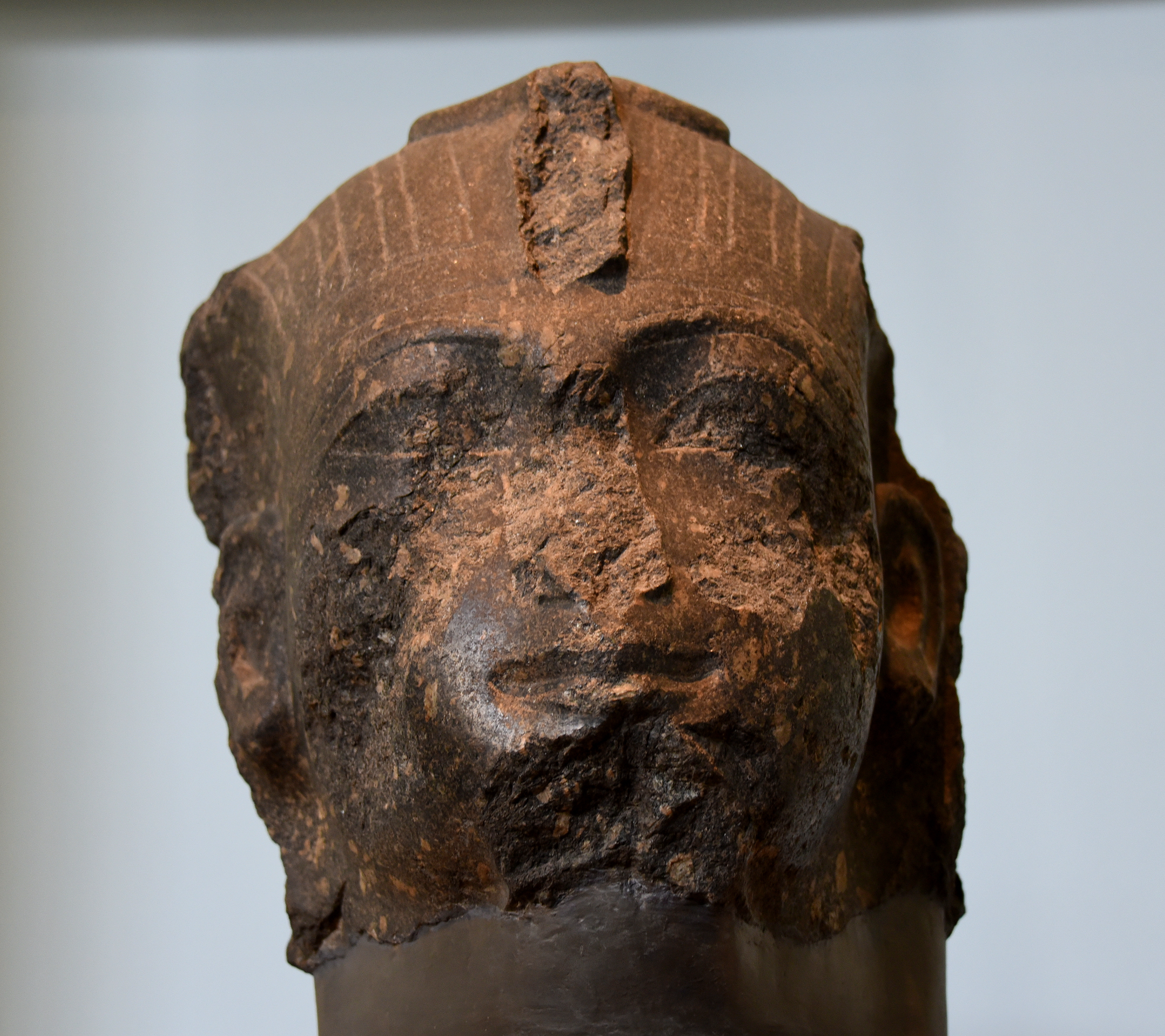
Head of a colossal statue of Thutmose IV, currently housed in the British Museum. Heavily weathered.

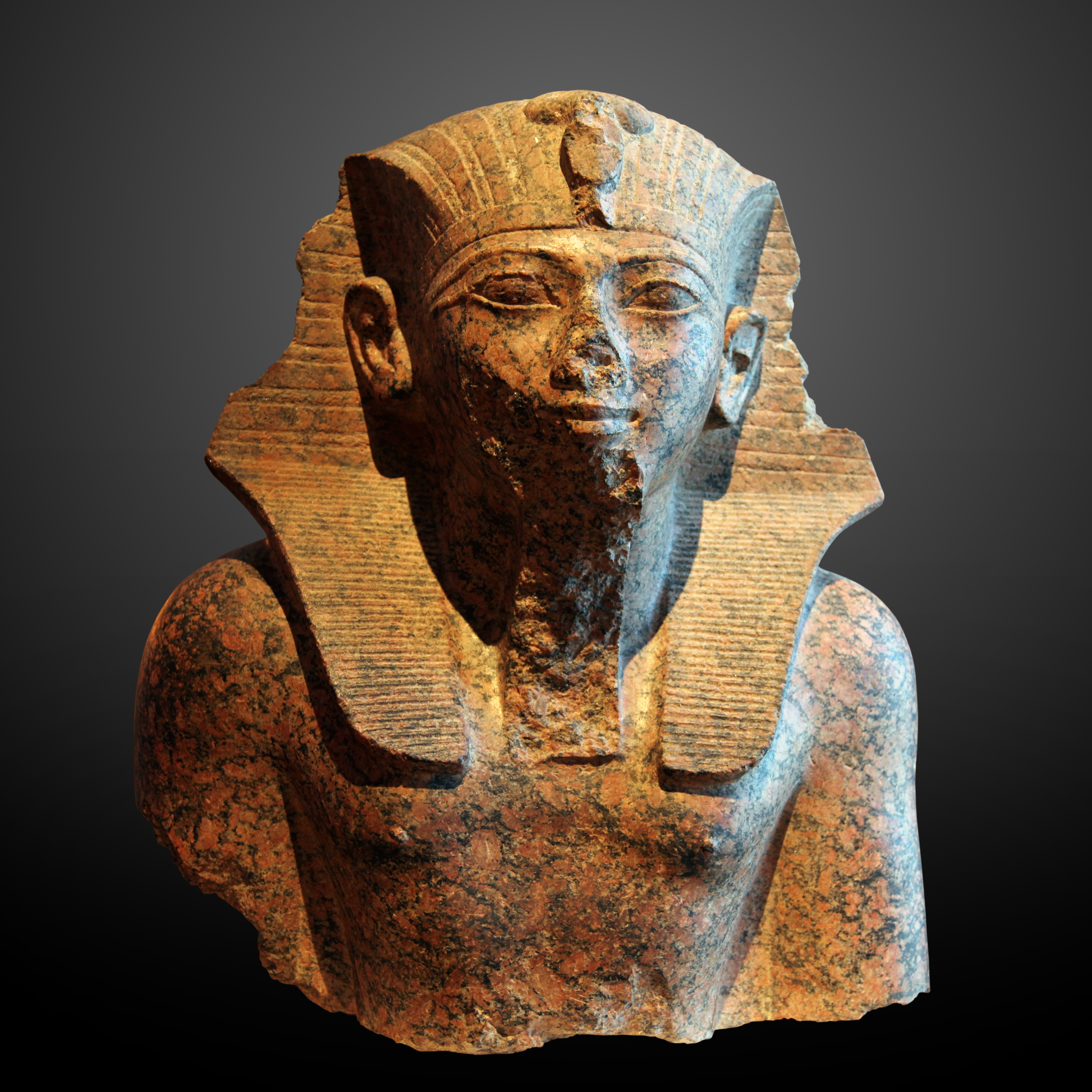
Granite bust of Thutmose IV. Weathered to just the torso. Currently held at the Musée du Louvre.

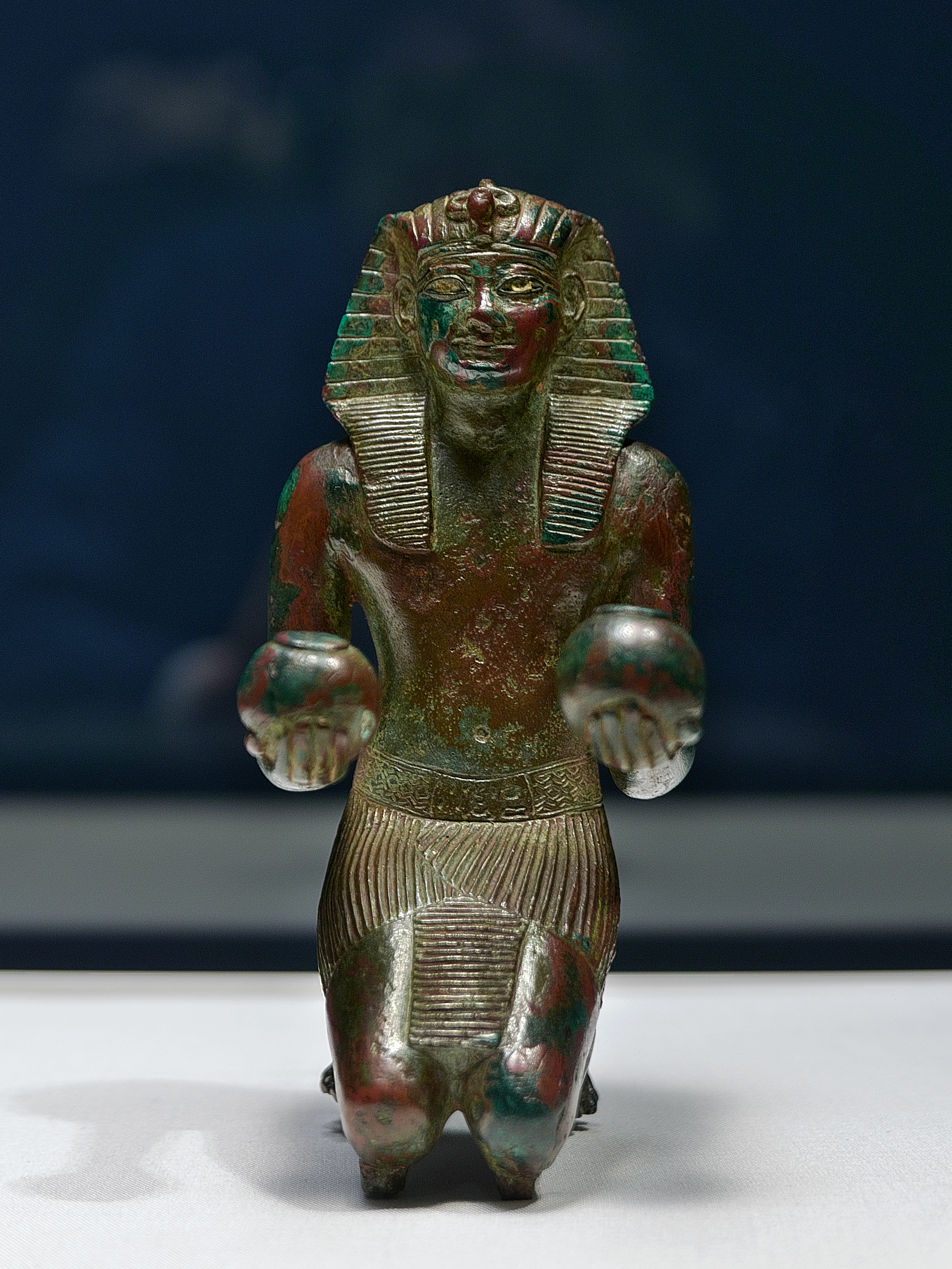
Bronze statuette of Thutmose IV, currently housed in the British Museum

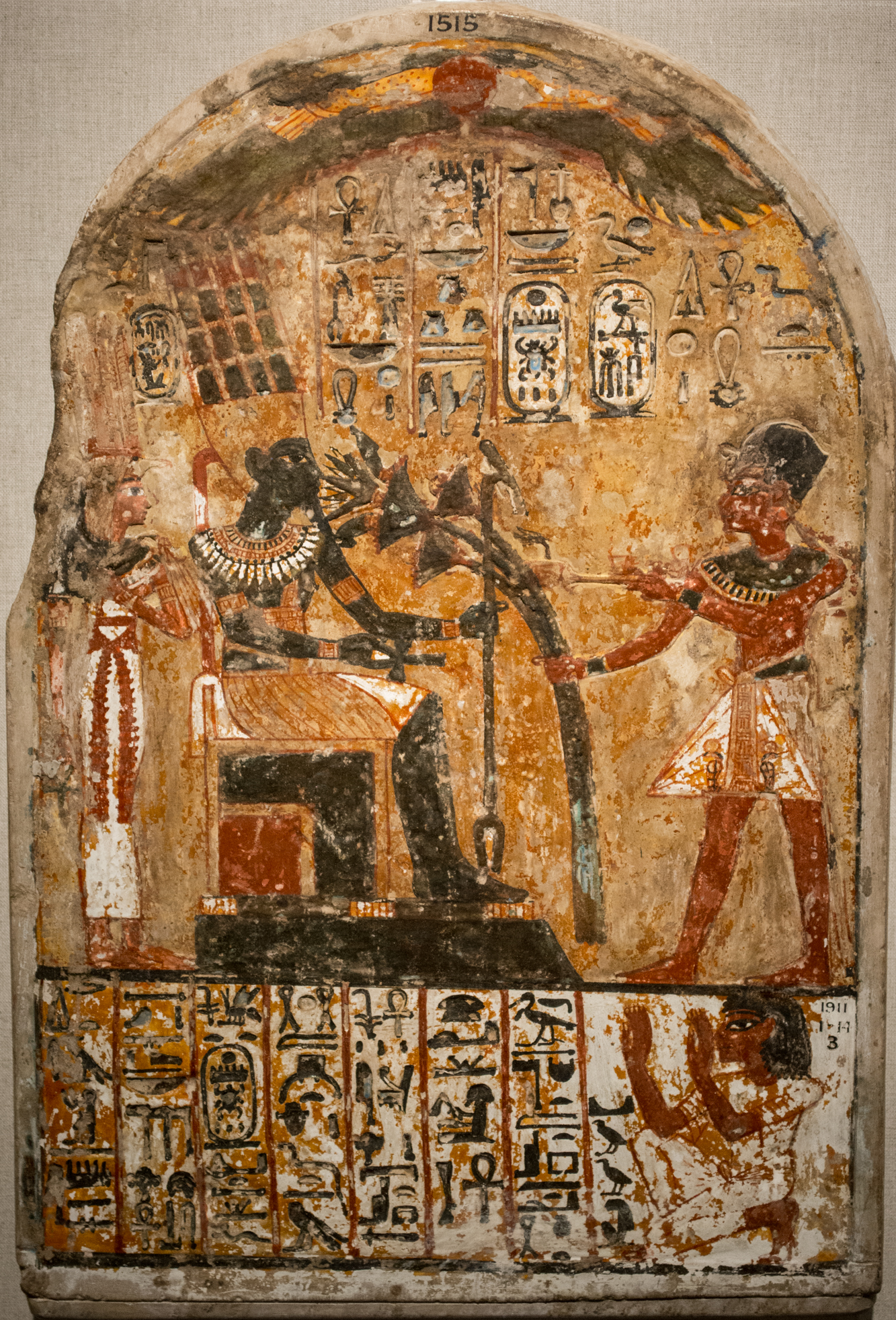
Stela of Tuthmosis IV, created in Egypt about 1279 to 1203 BC. Found at Deir el-Medina or Karnak, Thebes.

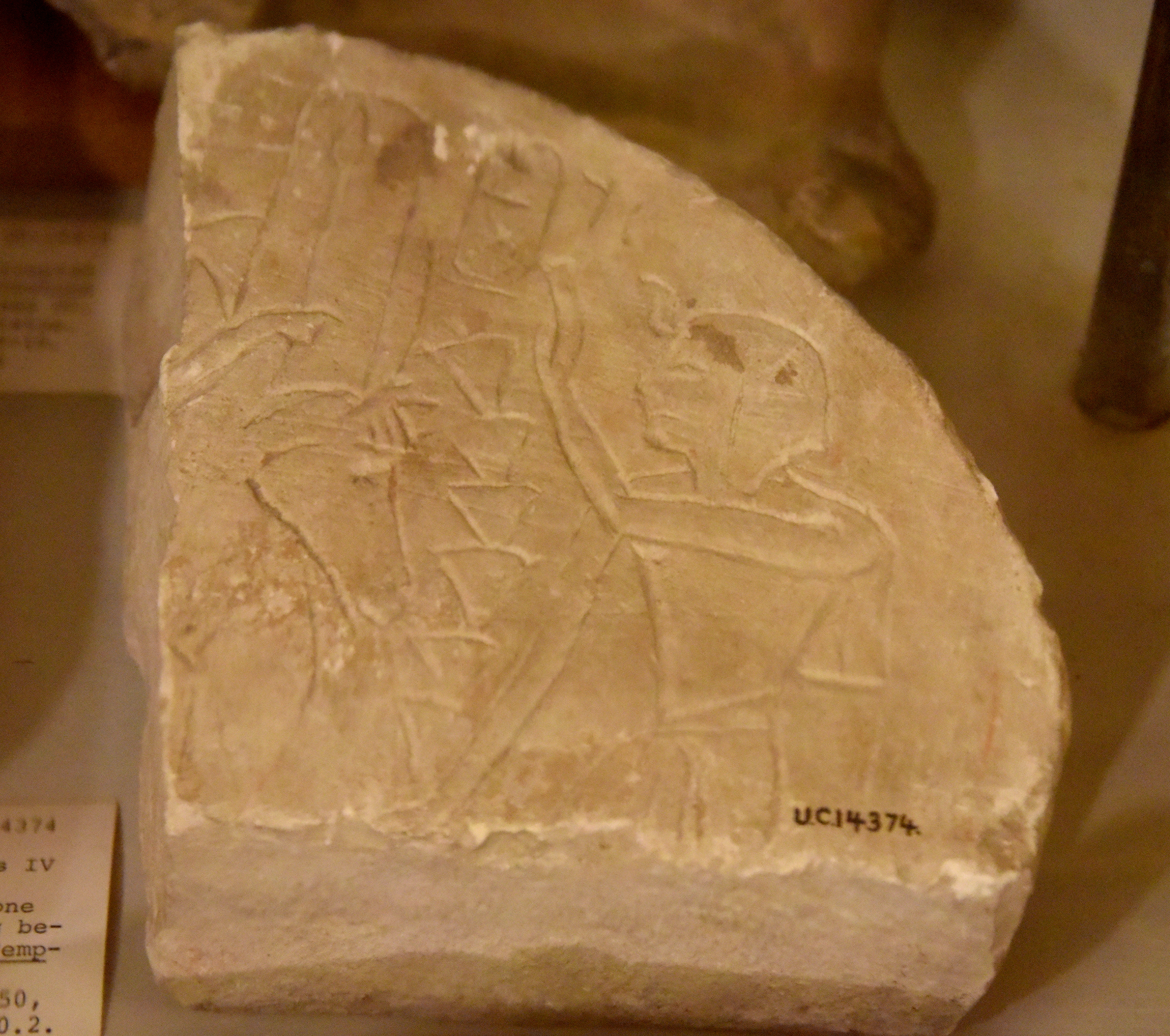
Fragment of a crudely carved limestone stela showing king Thutmose IV adoring a goddess (probably Astarte). From Thebes, Egypt. 18th Dynasty. The Petrie Museum of Egyptian Archaeology, London

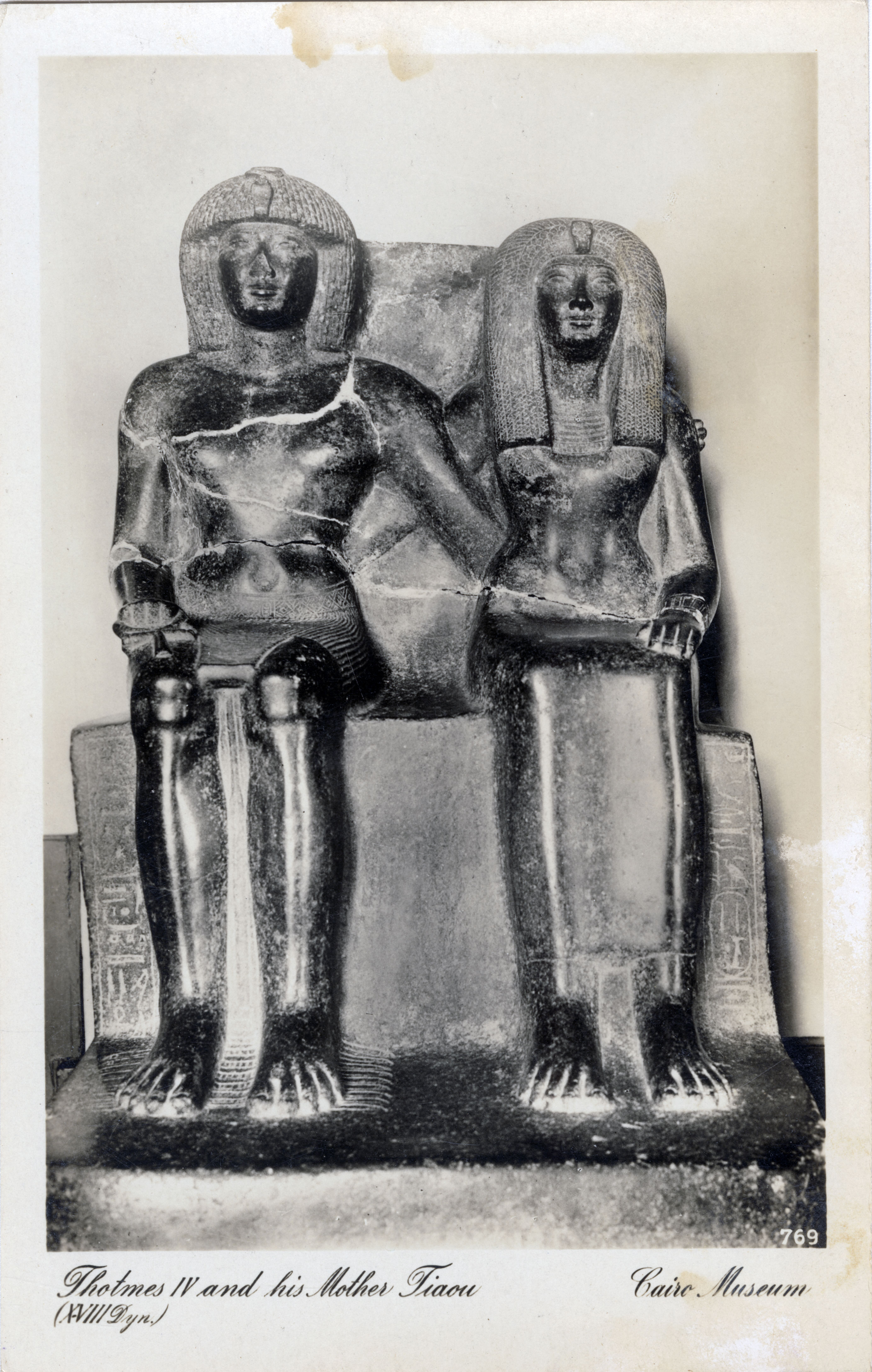
Statue of Thutmose IV and his mother Tiaa. From the Egyptian museum in Cairo. Tiaa did not become a prominent figure until Thutmose IV's ascension to the throne.

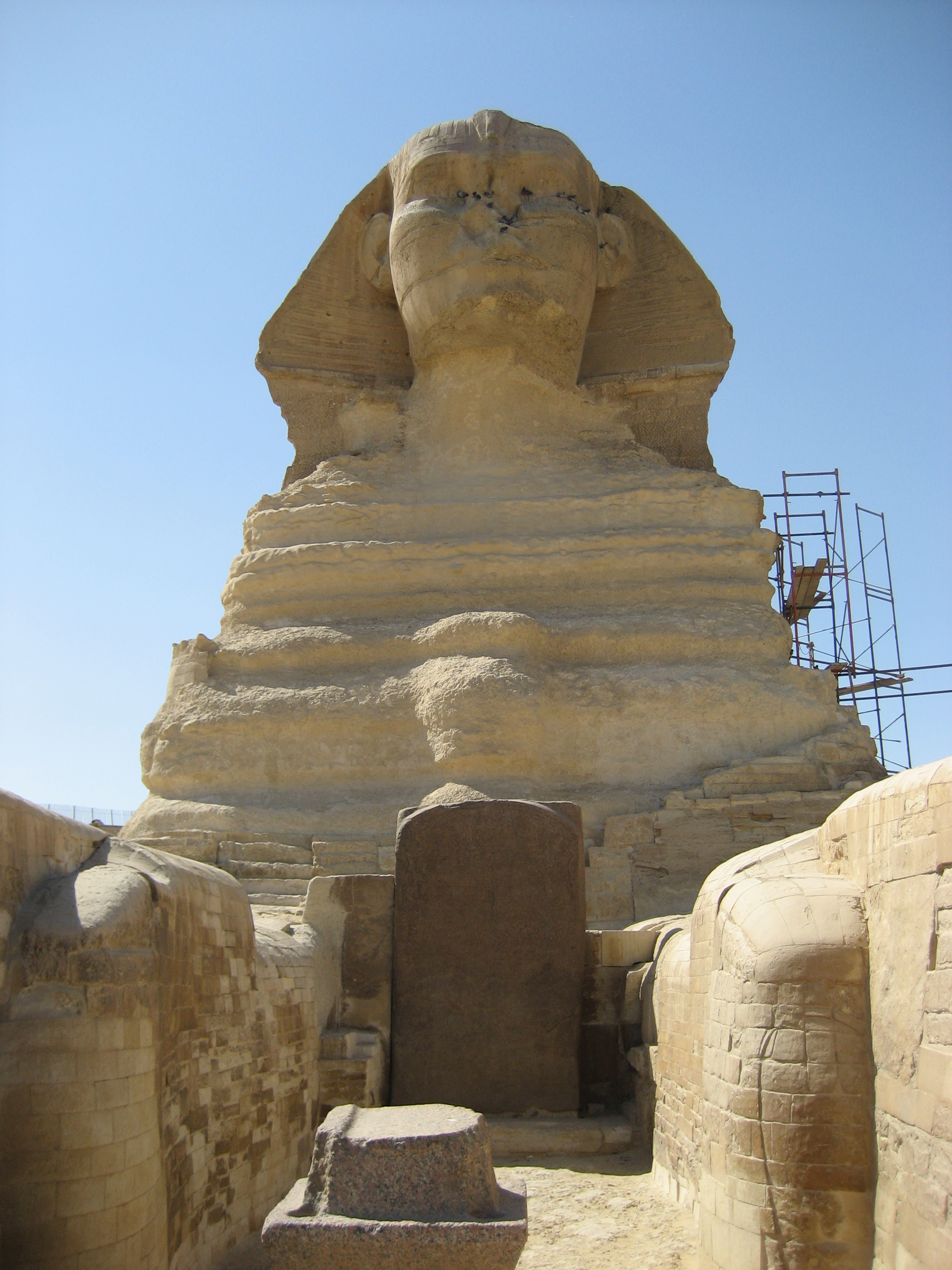
The Sphinx with the dream stela of Thutmose IV in between its arms

== See also ==
- History of Ancient Egypt

== Sources ==
- Aston, David, (2012), Radiocarbon, Wine Jars And New Kingdom Chronology Ägypten und Levante/Egypt and the Levante 22 (2012), pp.300-306 (on Thutmose IV)
- von Beckerath, Jürgen (1984). Handbuch Der Ägyptischen Königsnamen (in German). Berlin: Münchner Ägyptologische Studien. pp. 228–229. Retrieved 7 December 2021.
- Bryan, Betsy (1991). The Reign of Thutmose IV. Baltimore: The Johns Hopkins University Press.
- Clayton, Peter (1994). Chronicle of the Pharaohs. Thames & Hudson Ltd. ISBN 978-0-500-05074-3
- Kemp, Barry J. (1989). Ancient Egypt: Anatomy of a Civilization. Routledge.
- Leprohon, Ronald J. (2013). The Great Name: Ancient Egyptian Royal Titulary. SBL Press. ISBN 978-1-58983-736-2. Retrieved 7 December 2021.
- Schneider, Thomas. "Contributions to the Chronology of the New Kingdom and the Third Intermediate Period." Ägypten Und Levante / Egypt and the Levant 20 (2010): 373–403.
- Hawass, Zahi, and Mark Lehner. "The Sphinx: Who Built It, And Why?" Archaeology 47, no. 5 (1994): 30–41.
- Harris, John R. "Contributions to the History of the Eighteenth Dynasty." Studien Zur Altägyptischen Kultur 2 (1975): 95–101.
- Bryan, Betsy M. "Portrait Sculpture of Thutmose IV." Journal of the American Research Center in Egypt 24 (1987): 3–20.
- Hoffmeier, James K. "Observations on the Evolving Chariot Wheel in the 18th Dynasty." Journal of the American Research Center in Egypt 13 (1976): 43–45.
