= Webensenu =

Ancient Egyptian prince

- Egyptian prince
- Dynasty: 18th Dynasty
- Father: Amenhotep II
- Religion: Ancient Egyptian religion

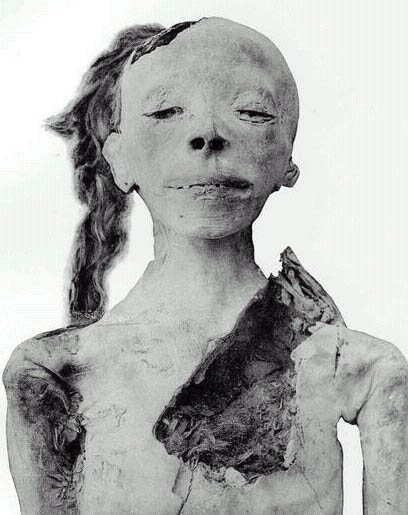
Possible mummy of Webensenu

Webensenu was an ancient Egyptian prince of the Eighteenth Dynasty. He was a son of Pharaoh Amenhotep II and the brother of pharaoh Thutmose IV.

He is mentioned, along with his brother Nedjem, on a statue of Minmose, overseer of the works in Karnak.

He died as a child and may have been buried in his father's tomb, KV35, possibly being the mummy laid alongside Tiye and the Younger Lady. His canopic jars and shabtis were found in the tomb as well. His possible mummy is still there, and it indicates that he may have died around the age of ten.
