= Amenemope =

i mn n Aa15 O45
Amenemopet
in hieroglyphs

Amenemope, also Amenemopet, Amenemipet or Amunemopet (ỉmn-m-ỉp3.t, Greek: αμενωφις; “Amun in Luxor”) is an Ancient Egyptian name. Its notable bearers were:

- Amenemope (pharaoh) (died 992 BC), pharaoh, 21st dynasty
- Amenemopet (prince), probably a son of Amenhotep II (18th dynasty)
- Amenemipet called Pairy, a vizier dated to the reigns of Amenhotep II and Thutmose IV
- Amenemopet (princess), a daughter of Thutmose IV (18th dynasty)
- Amenemopet, a son of Ramesses II, 19th on the lists of princes; see List of children of Ramesses II (19th dynasty)
- Amenemopet (Viceroy of Kush) served as Viceroy of Kush during the reign of Seti I
- Amenemope (author), son of Kanakht, ostensible author of The Instruction of Amenemope, dated to the Ramesside Period
