= Amenhotep (prince) =

Ancient Egyptian prince

- Egyptian prince
- Dynasty: 18th Dynasty
- Father: Amenhotep II
- Mother: Tiaa
- Religion: Ancient Egyptian religion

i mn n R4 t p
Amenhotep
in hieroglyphs
Era: New Kingdom
(1550–1069 BC)

Amenhotep was an ancient Egyptian prince of the Eighteenth Dynasty, the son of Pharaoh Amenhotep II. He is generally regarded as having been the crown prince and likely heir apparent to his father before his death. His premature death probably resulted in the accession of his younger brother, the future Pharaoh Thutmose IV.

== Life ==
Little is known about Amenhotep's life. He is attested in an administrative papyrus now housed in the British Museum, where he is described as a priest of Ptah, one of the principal deities of ancient Egypt.

A stela discovered near the Great Sphinx of Giza depicts a priest of Ptah whose name was deliberately erased in antiquity. Egyptologists have suggested that this figure may represent Prince Amenhotep.

Because Amenhotep does not appear in later records and never succeeded to the throne, scholars generally conclude that he died before his father. His death likely altered the line of succession and enabled his brother Thutmose IV to become king.

== Succession ==
The evidence for Amenhotep's position as heir is indirect. As a royal son holding a prominent religious office and appearing in official records, he is often considered the most likely crown prince during part of Amenhotep II's reign. However, no surviving inscription explicitly identifies him with the title of crown prince, and some aspects of his status remain uncertain.

== See also ==
- Amenhotep II
- Thutmose IV
- Eighteenth Dynasty of Egypt
- Ancient Egyptian religion

== Bibliography ==
- Dodson, Aidan; Hilton, Dyan (2004). The Complete Royal Families of Ancient Egypt. Thames & Hudson. ISBN 978-0500051283.
