= Great Royal Wife =

Principal wife of the pharaoh of Ancient Egypt

A typical depiction of a great royal wife based on a New Kingdom tomb painting

M23 N41 X1 wr t
Great Royal Wife
in hieroglyphs

Great Royal Wife, or alternatively, Chief King's Wife (Ancient Egyptian: Hemet Nesut Weret) is the title that was used to refer to the principal wife of the pharaoh of Ancient Egypt, who served many official functions.

== Description ==
While most ancient Egyptians were monogamous, a male pharaoh would have had other, lesser wives and concubines in addition to the Great Royal Wife. This arrangement would allow the pharaoh to enter into diplomatic marriages with the daughters of allies, as was the custom of ancient kings.

In the past the order of succession in Ancient Egypt was thought to pass through the royal women. This theory, referred to as the Heiress Theory, has been rejected regarding the Eighteenth Dynasty ever since a 1980s study of its royalty. Ideally, the throne would be granted to the pharaoh's eldest surviving son, and under normal circumstances, the title "eldest king's son" (s3-nsw smsw) was precisely the exclusive title of the crown prince, as revealed by the Twentieth Dynasty text The Contendings of Horus and Seth: a son's right of inheritance always took precedence over that of his uncle, and an elder brother's over that of a younger brother. No explicit provision in the historical sources stipulates that the queen's status itself affected the choice of heir, although historical evidence shows that some queens, regardless of their status, took considerable interest in the matter and attempted to exert influence.

Before the title of the Great Royal Wife was created, different titles were given to distinguish the senior most wife of the pharaoh from the other wives, usually by having the most titles. The titles given to the senior most wife included Mother of the King of Upper and Lower Egypt, Daughter of the King of Upper and Lower Egypt, King's Daughter of his body, Beloved by deities, She who sees Horus and Seth, Great one of the hetes-sceptre, She who is united with the one beloved of the Two Ladies, the one united with the beauty of the white crown, One great of praise, Priestess of Hathor, the Greatly loved Wife of the King, the beloved Wife of the King, companion of Horus, etc. After the creation of the title of Great Royal Wife, these titles continued to be regarded as symbols of status and were bestowed on high-ranking queens, although the frequency with which some of them were granted declined significantly over time.

An earlier attempt at a single title for the senior most wife of the pharaoh was Khenemetneferhedjet, meaning united with the white crown. After the title of the Great Royal Wife was created, it was seldom bestowed on queens thereafter, a few individual queens in the early Eighteenth Dynasty held this title, but there is no evidence that any queen after that period used it. queens who had been given the Khenemetneferhedjet title were retroactively recognized as Great Royal Wife by later dynasties.

Meretseger, the chief wife of Senusret III, may be the earliest queen whose name appears with this title; she also was the first consort known to write her name in a cartouche. However, she is only attested in the New Kingdom so the title might be an anachronism. Perhaps the first holder of its title was Nubkhaes of the Second Intermediate Period.

The mother of the heir to the throne was not always the Great Royal Wife, but once a pharaoh was crowned, it was possible to grant the mother of the king the title of Great Royal Wife, along with other titles. Examples include Iset, the mother of Thutmose III, Tiaa, the mother of Thutmose IV and Mutemwia, the mother of Amenhotep III.

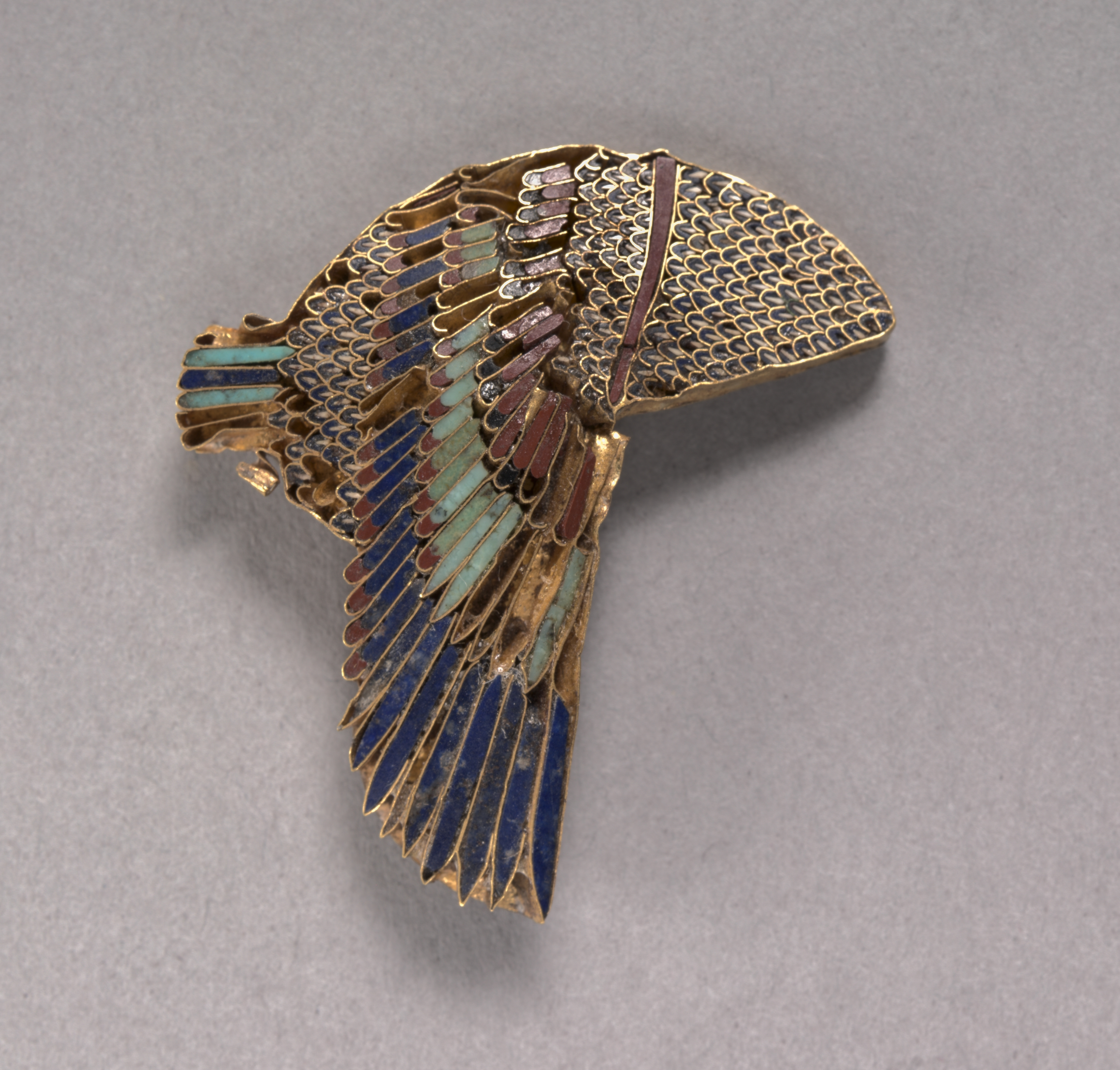
The Vulture crown, a crown worn by Great Royal Wives and female pharaohs

A special place in the history of great royal wives was taken by Hatshepsut. She was Great Royal Wife to her half-brother Thutmose II. During this time Hatshepsut also became God's Wife of Amun (the highest ranking priestess in the temple of Amun in Karnak). After the death of her husband, she became regent because of the minority of her stepson, the only male heir (born to Iset), who eventually would become Thutmose III. During this time Hatshepsut was crowned as pharaoh and ruled very successfully in her own right for many years. Although other women before her had ruled Egypt, Hatshepsut was the first woman to take the title, pharaoh, as it was a new term being used for the rulers, not having been used before the eighteenth dynasty. When she became pharaoh, she designated her daughter, Neferure, as God's Wife of Amun to perform the duties of high priestess. Her daughter may have been the great royal wife of Thutmose III, but there is no clear evidence for this proposed marriage.

In Kush, the rulers often structured their households in much the same way as has just been described. In ancient Egyptian royal ideology, queens represented the divine feminine principle and played an important symbolic role in maintaining and renewing kingship. Even though they occupied important positions within the royal court, only some queens exercised actual political authority.

== Examples ==
=== Ancient Egypt ===
==== Middle Kingdom ====
Dynasty	Name	Husband	Comments
12th Dynasty	Meretseger	Senusret III	Possibly the first holder of the title, but not definitively attested to in contemporary sources

==== Second Intermediate Period ====
Dynasty	Name	Husband	Comments
13th Dynasty	Nubhotepti	Hor	
13th Dynasty	Nubkhaes (I)	Sobekhotep V, Sobekhotep VI or Wahibre Ibiau	
13th Dynasty	Ineni	Merneferre Ai	
13th Dynasty	Nehyt	(?)	Only known from two scarab seals
13th Dynasty	Satsobek	(?)	Only known from one scarab seal
13th Dynasty	Sathathor	(?)	Only known from one scarab seal, reading of name not fully certain
16th Dynasty	Mentuhotep	Djehuti	
16th Dynasty	Sitmut	Mentuhotep VI (?)	
17th Dynasty	Nubemhat	Sobekemsaf I	
17th Dynasty	Sobekemsaf	Nubkheperre Intef	Sister of an unknown king, buried in Edfu
17th Dynasty	Nubkhaes (II)	Sobekemsaf II	
17th Dynasty	Tetisheri	Senakhtenre Ahmose	Mother of Seqenenre Tao
17th Dynasty	Ahhotep I	Seqenenre Tao	Mother of Ahmose I and Ahmose-Nefertari

==== New Kingdom ====
Dynasty	Name	Husband	Comments
18th Dynasty	Ahmose-Nefertari	Ahmose I	Mother of Amenhotep I and Ahmose-Meritamon
18th Dynasty	Sitkamose	Ahmose I (?)	
18th Dynasty	Ahmose-Henuttamehu	Ahmose I (?)	Daughter of Queen Inhapi
18th Dynasty	Ahmose-Meritamon	Amenhotep I	
18th Dynasty	Ahmose	Thutmose I	Mother of Hatshepsut
18th Dynasty	Hatshepsut	Thutmose II	Second great royal wife to her father, Thutmose I, and later, ruling pharaoh with her daughter, Neferure, as great royal wife
18th Dynasty	Iset	Thutmose II	Received the title from her son Thutmose III after he became pharaoh
18th Dynasty	Neferure (?)	Thutmose III	No evidence documents their marriage
18th Dynasty	Satiah	Thutmose III	
18th Dynasty	Merytre-Hatshepsut	Thutmose III	Mother of Amenhotep II. Received the title from her son after he became pharaoh
18th Dynasty	Tiaa	Amenhotep II	Received the title from her son Thutmose IV after her husband's death - Amenhotep II tried to break the royal lineage by not recording any of his wives, who may not have been royal, and Tiaa was identified only later, by her son
18th Dynasty	Nefertari	Thutmose IV	
18th Dynasty	Iaret	Thutmose IV	
18th Dynasty	Tenettepihu	Thutmose IV (?)	Known from a shabti and funerary statue, thought to date to the time of Tuthmosis IV (?)
18th Dynasty	Mutemwia	Thutmose IV	Received the title from her son, Amenhotep III, after her husband's death to make his own birth seem royal
18th Dynasty	Tiye	Amenhotep III	Mother of Akhenaten
18th Dynasty	Sitamun	Amenhotep III	Eldest daughter of Amenhotep III and Tiye
18th Dynasty	Iset	Amenhotep III	Daughter of Amenhotep III and Tiye
18th Dynasty	Nebetnehat	Unidentified	Known from cartouche found on canopic fragments, she lived during the mid to late 18th Dynasty
18th Dynasty	Nefertiti	Akhenaten	Mother of Meritaten and Ankhesenamun, possible daughter of Ay, likely became pharaoh in her own right as King Neferneferuaten
18th Dynasty	Meritaten	Smenkhkare	Daughter of Akhenaten and Nefertiti
18th Dynasty	Ankhesenamen	Tutankhamen	Daughter of Akhenaten and Nefertiti
18th Dynasty	Tey	Ay	
18th Dynasty	Mutnedjmet	Horemheb	Probable daughter of Ay and Tey
19th Dynasty	Sitre	Ramesses I	Mother of Seti I
19th Dynasty	Tuya	Seti I	Mother of Ramesses II
19th Dynasty	Nefertari	Ramesses II	
19th Dynasty	Isetnofret	Ramesses II	Mother of Merenptah
19th Dynasty	Bintanath	Ramesses II	Eldest daughter of Ramesses II and Isetnofret
19th Dynasty	Meritamen	Ramesses II	Daughter of Ramesses II and Nefertari
19th Dynasty	Nebettawy	Ramesses II	Daughter of Ramesses II and Nefertari
19th Dynasty	Henutmire	Ramesses II	Sister or daughter of Ramesses II
19th Dynasty	Maathorneferure	Ramesses II	Hittite princess
19th Dynasty	Isetnofret II	Merenptah	Sister or niece of her husband
19th Dynasty	Tawosret	Seti II	Later pharaoh
19th Dynasty	Takhat	Seti II (?)	Depicted as the wife of Sety II on a (usurped) statue, may have been the mother of Amenmesse (?)
20th Dynasty	Tiye-Mereniset	Setnakhte	Mother of Ramesses III
20th Dynasty	Iset Ta-Hemdjert	Ramesses III	Mother of Ramesses IV and Ramesses VI
20th Dynasty	Henutwati	Ramesses V	Queen mentioned in the Wilbour Papyrus
20th Dynasty	Nubkhesbed	Ramesses VI	Mother of Princess Isis, who later, would be the God's Wife of Amun
20th Dynasty	Baketwernel	Ramesses IX	
20th Dynasty	Tyti	Ramesses X or Ramesses III	Possibly a wife of Ramesses X, buried in QV52
20th Dynasty	Anuketemheb	unknown	Original owner of sarcophagus and canopic jars later used for Queen Takhat in KV10, dates to the 19th or 20th Dynasty

==== Third Intermediate Period ====
Dynasty	Name	Husband	Comments
21st Dynasty	Nodjmet	Herihor	Probable mother of Pinedjem I
21st Dynasty	Mutnedjmet	Psusennes I	
23rd Dynasty	Karomama	Takelot II	Mother of Osorkon III
25th Dynasty	Khensa	Piye	
25th Dynasty	Peksater	Piye	
25th Dynasty	Takahatenamun	Taharqa	
25th Dynasty	Isetemkheb	Tanutamon	

==== Late Period ====
Dynasty	Name	Husband	Comments
26th Dynasty	Mehytenweskhet	Psamtik I	Mother of Necho II
26th Dynasty	Takhuit	Psamtik II	Mother of Wahibre

== See also ==
- List of ancient Egyptian royal consorts
- List of consorts of the Muhammad Ali dynasty, for the modern queens and sultanas of Egypt
- God's Wife of Amun
- Divine Adoratrice of Amun
- Interregnum queen
- Great Wife, for the modern term for principal polygynous consorts in Africa
- Conspiracies in ancient Egypt
