= Khaemwaset (disambiguation) =

N28 D36 Y1 G17 S40 X1 O49
Ḫˁj m W3st
(Khaemwaset)
in hieroglyphs
Era: New Kingdom
(1550–1069 BC)

Khaemwaset or Khaemweset ("He who appears in Thebes") was a personal ancient Egyptian name popular during the New Kingdom. Some notable bearers were:

- Khaemwaset (18th dynasty), prince and probably son of Amenhotep II
- Khaemwaset (Nubian official) under Tutankhamun
- Khaemwaset, the most famous of the Khaemwasets, prince and son of Ramesses II
- Khaemwaset C, son of Merneptah and Isetnofret II
- Khaemwaset (20th dynasty), prince and son of Ramesses III
- Khaemwaset (Vizier), vizier under Ramesses IX
