= Nedjem =

Ancient Egyptian prince

M29 Aa29 A1
Nedjem
in hieroglyphs
Era: New Kingdom
(1550–1069 BC)

Nedjem was an ancient Egyptian prince of the Eighteenth dynasty. He was a son of Pharaoh Amenhotep II.

He is known from only one source: he is mentioned, along with his brother Webensenu, on a statue of Minmose, overseer of the workmen in Karnak.
