= Nefertari (18th dynasty) =

Queen of the Eighteenth dynasty of Egypt

- Queen consort of Egypt
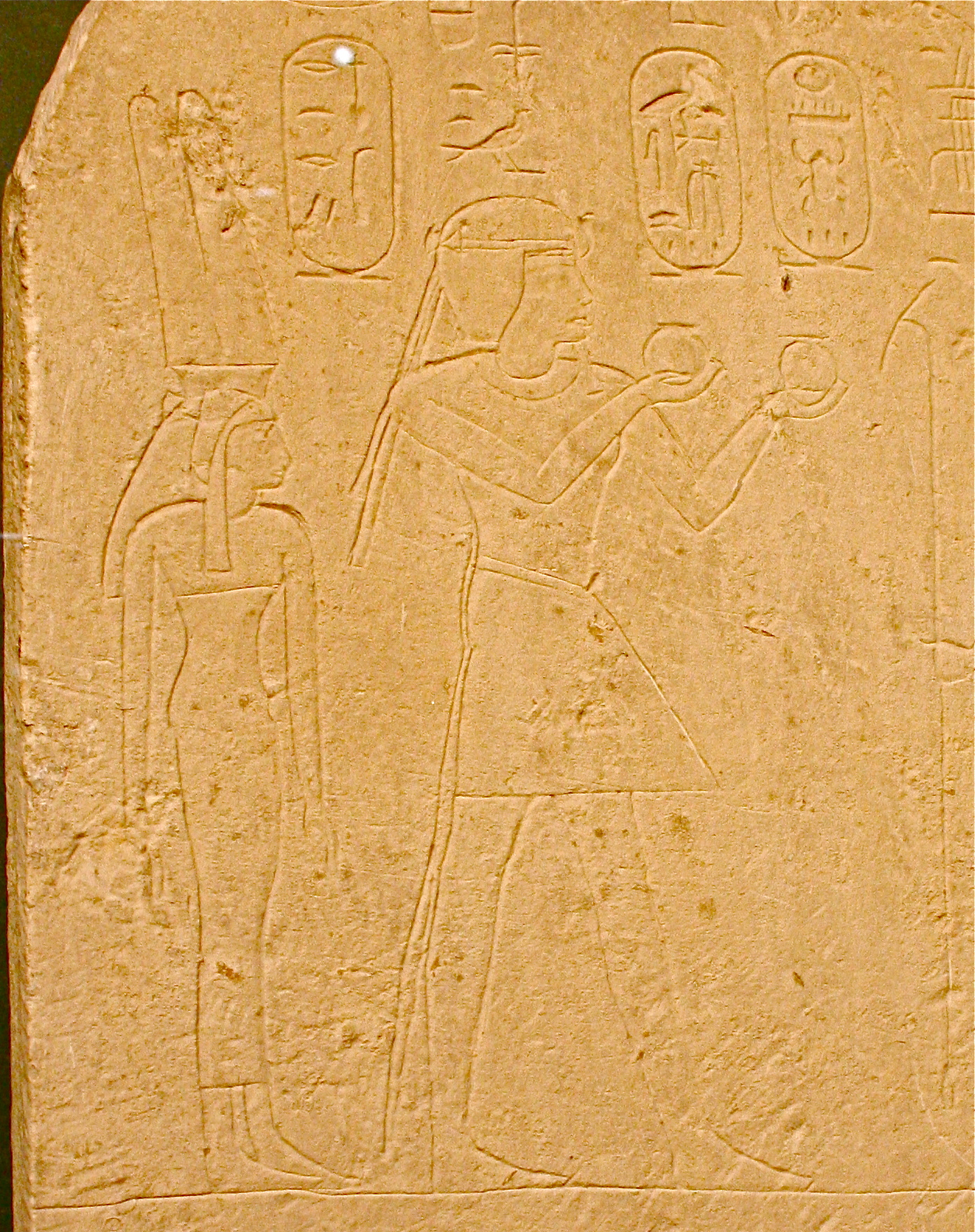
- The great royal wife Nefertari - from the Egyptian Museum in Leipzig, Germany
- Spouse: Tuthmosis IV
- Religion: Ancient Egyptian religion

nfr t D21 Z4 M17
Nefertari
in hieroglyphs
Era: New Kingdom
(1550–1069 BC)

Nefertari was a queen of the Eighteenth Dynasty of Egypt, the first Great Royal Wife of Pharaoh Thutmose IV.

Her origins are unknown, it is likely that she was a commoner. On several depictions she and queen mother Tiaa are depicted as goddesses accompanying Thutmose. For unknown reasons, in Thutmose's 7th year, two separate monuments attest to another Great Royal Wife, who was his sister Iaret; it has been suggested that she either died or was pushed into the background when Iaret was old enough to become Thutmose's wife.

However, many pharaohs concurrently had multiple Great Royal Wives. For instance, Amenhotep III designated his daughter Sitamun as a Great Royal Wife while his wife Tiye was still alive; Ramesses II had several daughter-queens coexisting alongside his Hittite Great Royal Wife; Ramesses III was also documented to have two Great Royal Wives simultaneously, one of whom was confirmed to hold princess status. Similarly, Iaret was a princess as well, and her sudden emergence was considered to follow the death of Tiaa. Due to her lineage, she assumed a role previously filled by the queen mother. Nefertari and Iaret differed significantly in their functions as queens: Nefertari was chosen as a wife by Thutmose IV, whereas Iaret, by virtue of her rank, succeeded Tiaa and was regarded as a wife only in a ritual sense. Had Nefertari survived until the end of Thutmose IV’s reign, they might have coexisted as Great Royal Wives.

Nefertari was depicted on 8 stelae from Giza together with her husband before various deities. She was also shown on a stela found in the Luxor Temple and was mentioned on a scarab found in Gurob. It is not known whether any children were born either to Nefertari or to Iaret; after Thutmose's death the next pharaoh was Amenhotep III, the son of a secondary wife called Mutemwia.
