= Meretseger (queen) =

Ancient Egyptian queen consort

< mr s g r A2 >
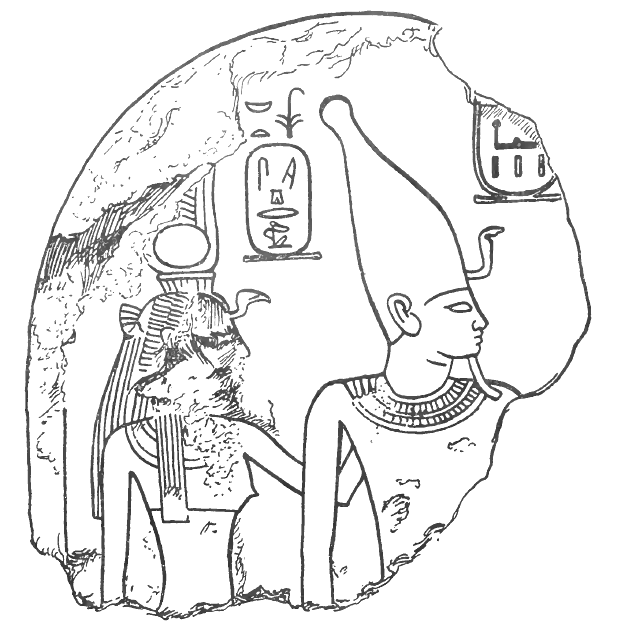
- Meretseger with Senusret III on a New Kingdom stela. British Museum, EA846.
- Dynasty: 12th Dynasty of Egypt
- Religion: Ancient Egyptian religion

Meretseger ("She who Loves Silence") may have been an ancient Egyptian queen consort.

== Biography ==
Meretseger appears in sources of the New Kingdom of Egypt as the wife of Senusret III. According to that she would be the first Egyptian queen consort to bear the title Great Royal Wife, which became the standard title for chief wives of kings. She was also the first queen consort whose name was written in a cartouche. However, as there are no contemporary sources relating to Meretseger, she is most likely a creation of the New Kingdom.

Along with Khenemetneferhedjet II and Neferthenut, she may have been one of the wives of Senusret III, along with Sithathoriunet. She was depicted on a New Kingdom stele now in the British Museum (EA846) and on an inscription in Semna dating to the reign of Thutmose III.
