= Iaret =

- Queen consort of Egypt; Great Royal Wife; King's Daughter; King's Sister
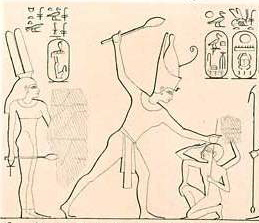
- Queen Iaret and Pharaoh Tuthmosis IV
- Burial: Thebes?
- Spouse: Tuthmosis IV
- Dynasty: 18th of Egypt
- Father: Amenhotep II
- Mother: unknown
- Religion: Ancient Egyptian religion

Iaret was a Great Royal Wife from the middle of the Eighteenth Dynasty of Ancient Egypt.

== Family ==
An inscription of Iaret: "The Great King's Wife, The King's Daughter, The King's Sister, Iaret"

laret was the daughter of Amunhotep II and wife of Thutmose IV. The transcription of her name is uncertain; it is written with a single cobra, which has a number of possible readings.

Her titles include: King's Daughter (s3t-niswt), Great King's Daughter (s3t-niswt-wrt), King's Sister (snt-niswt), and Great King's Wife (hmt-niswt-wrt).

There are no known children for Queen Iaret.

== Life ==
Iaret was the second great royal wife from the reign of Thutmose IV. Queen Nefertari is shown in inscriptions dating to the earlier part of the reign. A secondary wife of Thutmose IV by the name of Mutemwiya was the mother to the heir of the throne.

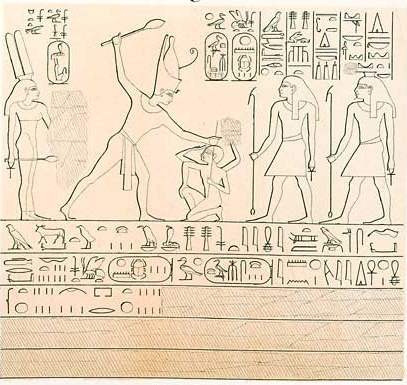
Year 7 stela of Thutmose IV from Konosso

Iaret is depicted on a Year 7 stela of Thutmose IV from Konosso. The stela depicts Thutmose smiting enemies before the Nubian gods Dedwen and Ha. Queen Iaret is depicted standing behind him.

Iaret's name is also known from inscriptions from the turquoise mines at Serabit el-Khadim in the Sinai from the same year.

It is not known when Iaret died or where she was buried.
