= Amenhotep II =

Seventh Pharaoh of the Eighteenth dynasty of Egypt

- Amenophis II
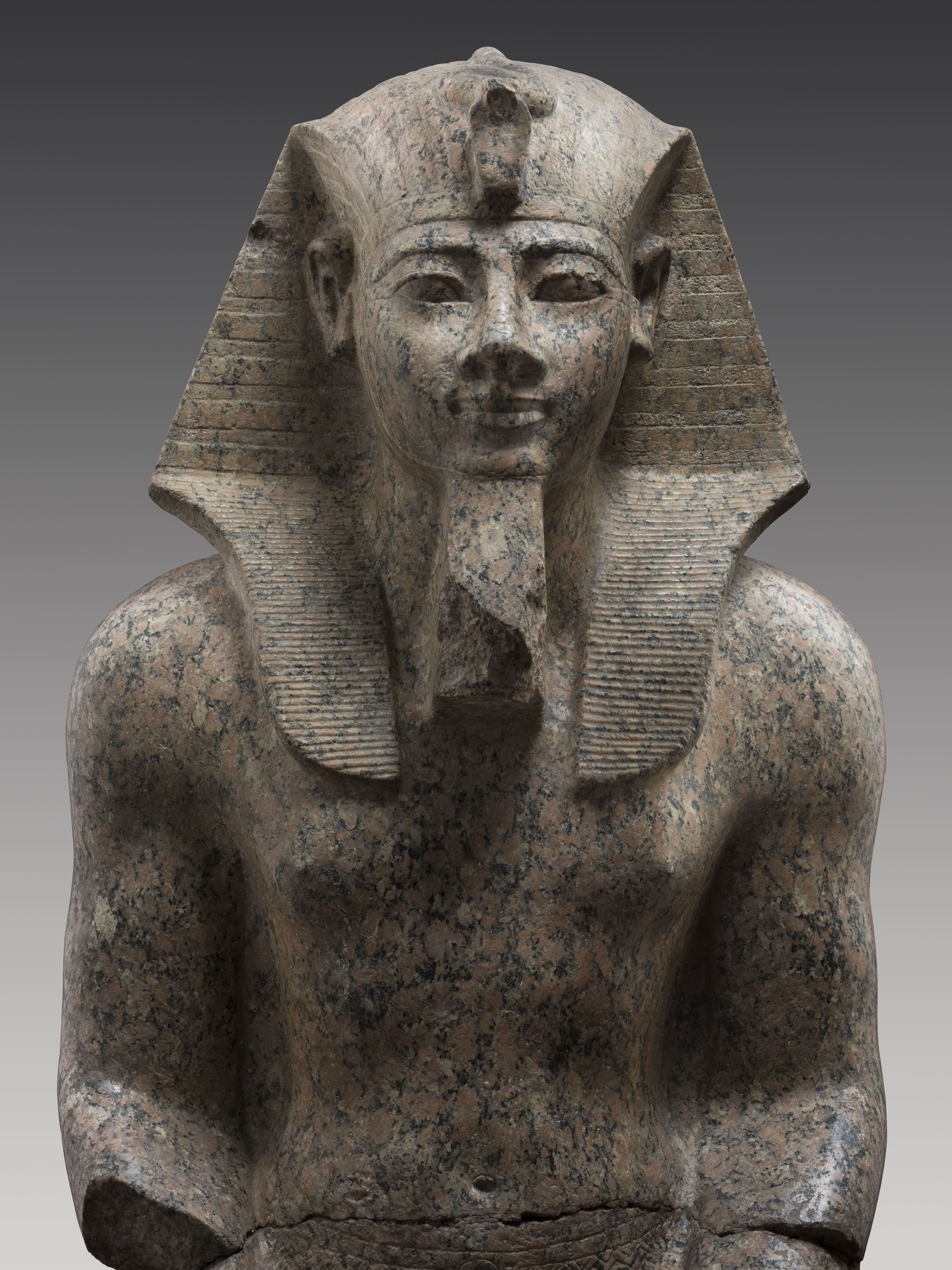
- Amenhotep II statue in Museo Egizio

Pharaoh
- Reign: 11 March 1425 - c. 1401 BC
- Predecessor: Thutmose III
- Successor: Thutmose IV
Royal titulary
Horus name
Ka nakht wer pekhty
kꜢ nḫt wr-pḥty
Victorious bull, great of might
G5	E1 D40 G36 r F9 F9
Nebty name
Weser fau, sekha em waset
wsr fꜢw sḫꜤi m wꜢst
Rich in splendor, who has been made to appear in Thebes
G16	wsr s f F40 G43 s N28 D36 m R19 t O49
Golden Horus
Ity sekhem.ef em tau nebu
iṯi sḫm.f m tꜢw nbw
Who has seized by means of his strong arm all lands
G8
V15 t D40 m S42 Z1 f m N17 N17 N17 V30 Z2s
Prenomen
Aa kheperu re
ꜤꜢ ḫprw rꜤ
The great one of the manifestations of Re
Great are the Manifestations of Re

M23 X1 L2 X1	N5 O29 L1 Z2s
Nomen
Imen hetepu heqa iunu
imn ḥtp(.w) hḳꜢ iwnw
Amun is satisfied, ruler of Heliopolis

G39 N5	i mn n R4 t p HqA iwn
- Consort: Tiaa
- Children: Amenhotep, Thutmose IV, Webensenu, and Nedjem
- Father: Thutmose III
- Mother: Merytre-Hatshepsut
- Born: c. 1443 BC
- Died: c. 1401 BC (aged c. 42)
- Burial: KV35
- Dynasty: 18th Dynasty of Egypt

Amenhotep II (lit. '"Amun is Satisfied"'), also called Amenophis II (c. 1443 BC – c. 1401 BC) was the seventh pharaoh of the 18th Dynasty of Egypt. He inherited a vast kingdom from his father Thutmose III, and held it by means of a few military campaigns in Syria; however, he fought much less than his father, and his reign saw the effective cessation of hostilities between Egypt and Mitanni, the major kingdoms vying for power in Syria. His reign is usually dated from 1425 to 1401 BC. His consort was Tiaa, who was barred from any prestige until Amenhotep's son, Thutmose IV, came into power.

== Family and early life ==
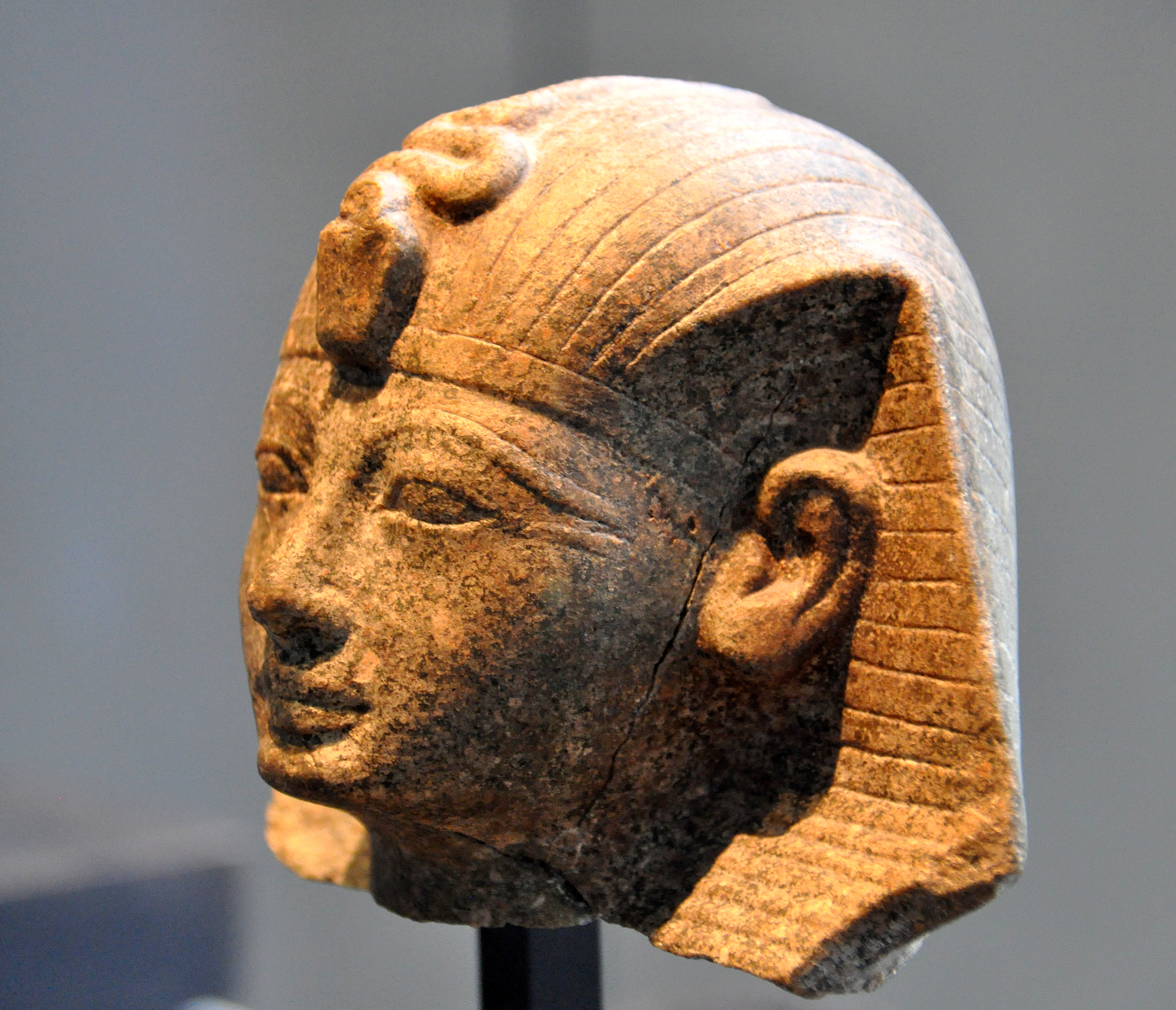
Head of Amenhotep II. 18th Dynasty, around 1420 BC. 18th Dynasty. State Museum of Egyptian Art, Munich.

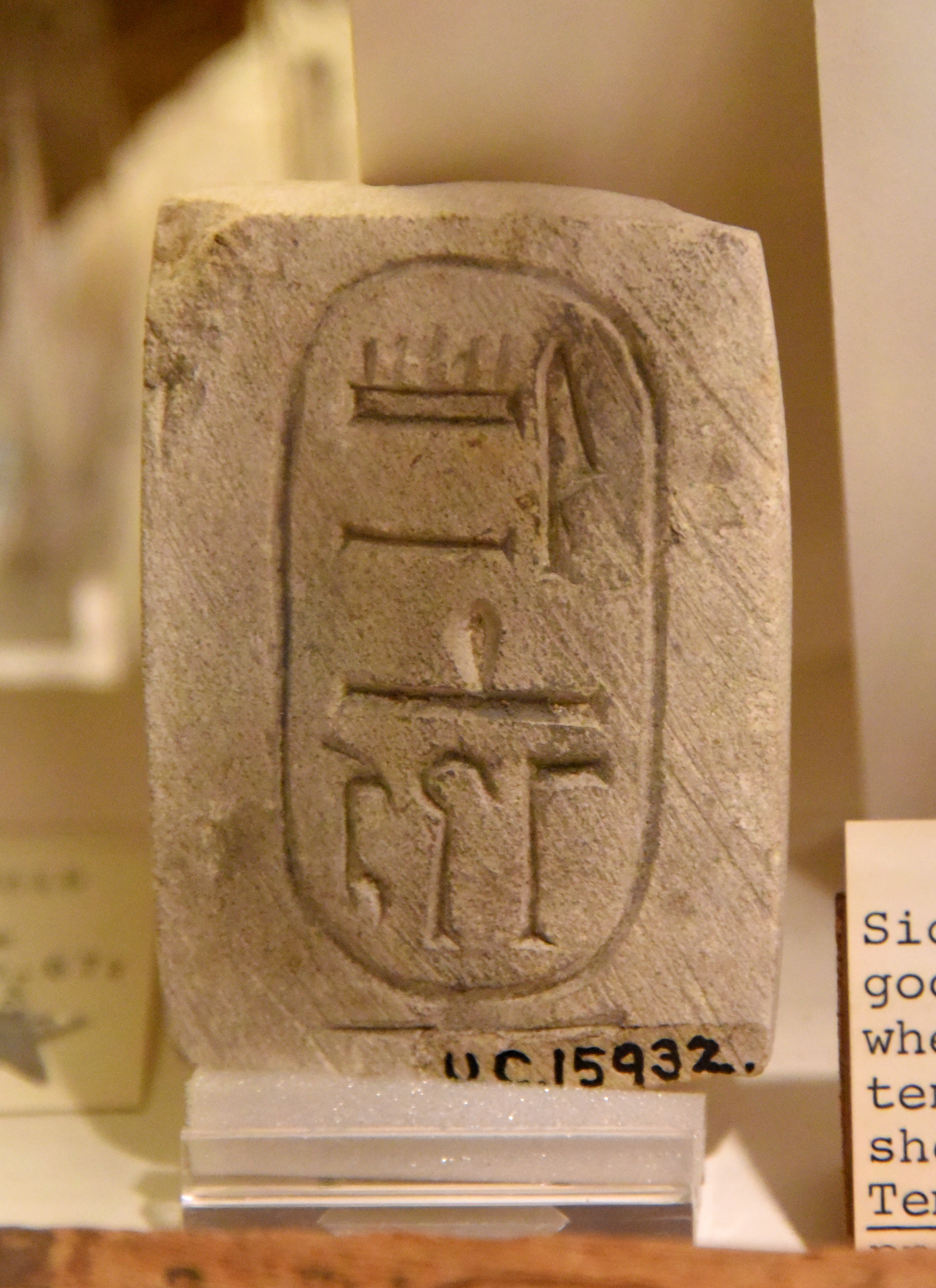
Foundation tablet. It shows the cartouche of the birth name and epithet "Amenhotep, the god, the Ruler of Thebes". 18th Dynasty. From Kurna, Egypt. Petrie Museum, London.

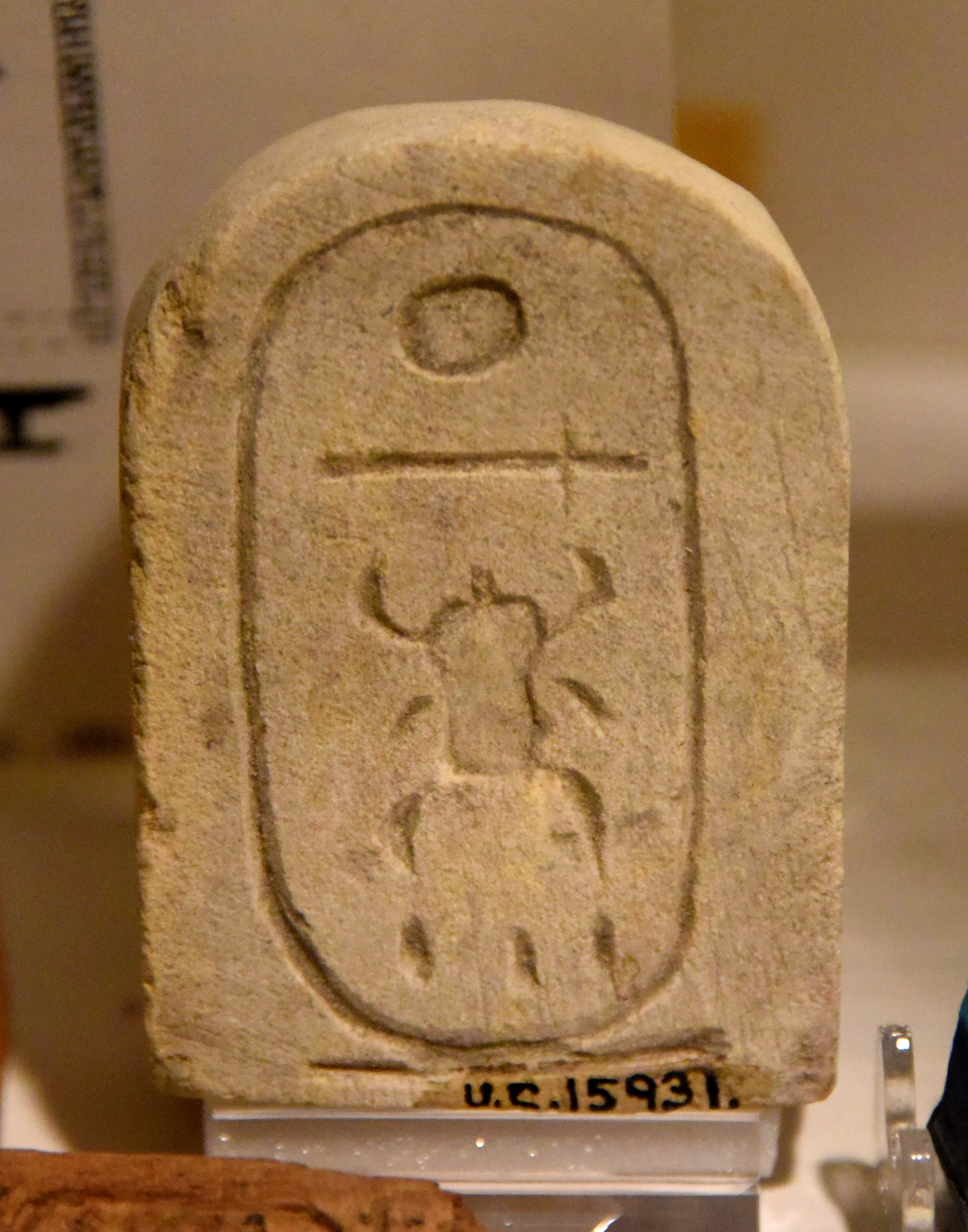
Foundation tablet showing the prenomen cartouche of the throne-name of Amenhotep II. 18th Dynasty. From Temple of Amenhotep II at Kurna, Egypt. Petrie Museum, London.

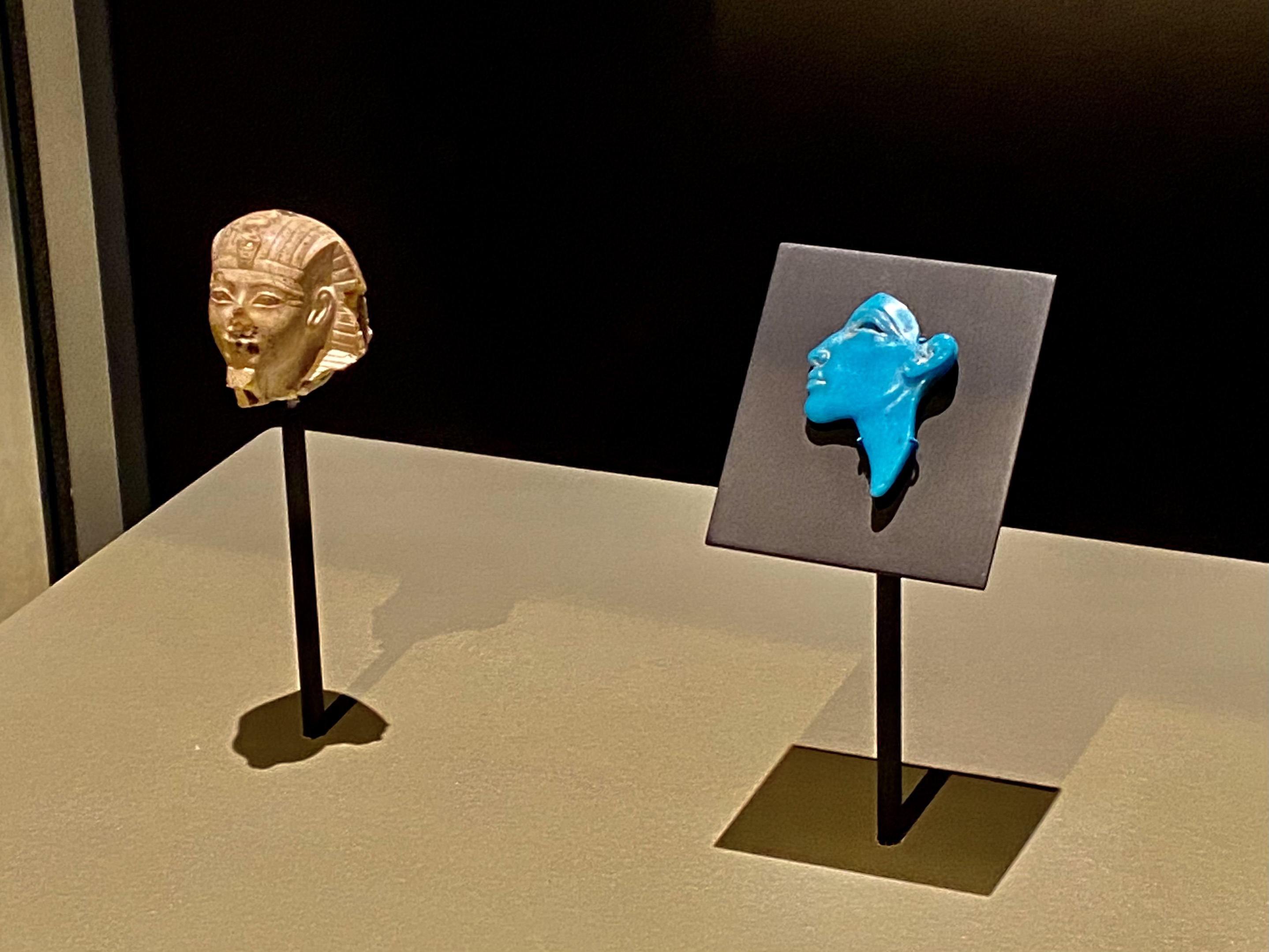
Portraits in glass of the pharaohs Amenhotep II (left) and Amenhotep IV, dating from the 18th Dynasty of Egypt: among the oldest pieces of glassware in the collection of the Corning Museum of Glass in Corning, New York. As seen in the "35 Centuries of Glass" gallery during a February 2022 visit to the museum.

Amenhotep II was born to Thutmose III and a minor wife of the king: Merytre-Hatshepsut. He was not, however, the firstborn son of this pharaoh; his elder brother Amenemhat was originally the intended heir to the throne since Amenemhat was designated the "king's eldest son" and overseer of the cattle of Amun in Year 24 of Thutmose's reign. However, between Years 24 and 35 of Thutmose III, both queen Satiah and prince Amenemhat died, which prompted the pharaoh to marry the non-royal Merytre-Hatshepsut. She would bear Thutmose III a number of children including the future Amenhotep II. Amenhotep II was born and raised in Memphis in the north, instead of in Thebes, the traditional capital. While a prince, he oversaw deliveries of wood sent to the dockyard of Peru-nūfe in Memphis, and was made the Setem, the high priest over Lower Egypt. Amenhotep II has left several inscriptions touting his athletic skills while he was a leader of the army before his crowning. Amenhotep II was no less athletic than his powerful father. He claims to have been able to shoot an arrow through a copper target one palm thick, and that he was able to row his ship faster and farther than two hundred members of the navy could row theirs. Some scepticism concerning the truth of these claims has been expressed among Egyptologists.

Amenhotep II acceded to the throne on the first day of the fourth month of Akhet, but his father died on the 30th day of the third month of Peret. If an Egyptian crown prince was proclaimed king but did not take the throne on the day of his father's death, it meant that he served as the junior coregent during his father's reign. A coregency with Thutmose III and Amenhotep II is believed to have lasted for two years and four months.

When he assumed power, Amenhotep II was 18 years old according to an inscription from his Great Sphinx stela:

"Now his majesty arose as king, as a fine youth, who was well-developed, having completed eighteen years upon his thighs in bravery. He was one who knew every work of Mentu, without equal on the battlefield. He was one who knew horses; one whose like did not exist in this numerous army. There was not one there who could draw his bow, nor could he be approached in running."

After becoming pharaoh, Amenhotep II married a woman of uncertain parentage named Tiaa. As many as nine sons and one daughter have been attributed to him. Amenhotep II's most important son was Thutmose IV, who succeeded him; however, there is significant evidence for his having many more children, with some accounts identifying 10 sons and one daughter. Princes Amenhotep, Webensenu, and Nedjem are all clearly attested, and Amenemopet, Amenemhat, Khaemwaset, and Aakheperure as well as a daughter, Iaret, are also possible children. This evidence of numerous siblings supports the theory, argued by scholars such as Douglas Petrovich, that Thutmose IV was not the original heir to the throne. The Dream Stele is frequently cited as political propaganda designed to justify his legitimacy over his elder brothers, who may have had stronger claims to the crown.

Papyrus B.M. 10056, which dates to sometime after Amenhotep II's 10th year, refers to a king's son and setem-priest Amenhotep. This Amenhotep might also be attested in a stele from Amenhotep II's temple at Giza, however the stele's name has been defaced so that positive identification is impossible. Stele B may belong to another son, Webensenu. Webensenu's name is otherwise attested on a statue of Amenhotep's chief architect, Minmose, and his canopic jars and a funerary statue have been found in Amenhotep II's tomb. Another Giza stele, stele C, records the name of a Prince Amenemopet, whose name is otherwise unattested. The same statue with the name Webensenu on it is also inscribed with the name of prince Nedjem, who is otherwise unattested.

There are other references to king's sons from this period who may or may not be sons of Amenhotep II. Two graffiti from Sahel mention a king's son and stable master named Khaemwaset, but specifically which king is his father is unknown. A figure with the name Amenemhet is recorded behind a prince Amenhotep in Theban tomb 64, and assuming this Amenhotep is indeed the king's son from B.M. 10056, Amenemhat would also be Amenhotep II's son. Additionally, a prince Aakheperure is mentioned in a Konosso graffito alongside a prince Amenhotep, and if one again assumes that this Amenhotep was the same person as the one in B.M. 10056, Aakheperure would also have been Amenhotep II's son. However, in both these cases the figure identified as Amenhotep has been identified by some as possible references to the later King Amenhotep III, which would make these two princes sons of Thutmose IV. In addition to sons, Amenhotep II may have had a daughter named Iaret, but she could have also been the daughter of Thutmose IV.

Two more sons had been attributed to Amenhotep II in the past; however, they have since been proven to be of other parentage. Gauthier catalogued one Usersatet, the "King's son of Kush," (i.e. Viceroy of Nubia) as a son of Amenhotep II, as well as one Re; however, both are now known to be unrelated to the royal family. Usersatet merely served as Amenhotep's chief official in Nubia and was not a blood relative of the king.

== Dates and length of reign ==
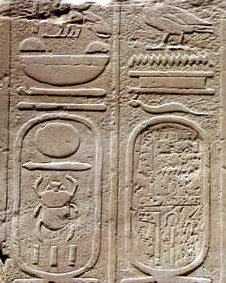
Amenhotep II's cartouche showing later damage and a variation of his nomen (from Karnak)

Amenhotep's coronation can be dated without much difficulty because of a number of lunar dates in the reign of his father, Thutmose III. These sightings limit the date of Thutmose II's accession to either 1504 or 1479 BC. Thutmose died after 54 years of reign, at which time Amenhotep would have acceded to the throne. Amenhotep's short 2 year coregency with his father would then move his accession two years and four months earlier, dating his accession to either 1427 BC in the low chronology, or in 1452 BC in the high chronology. The minimum length of his reign is indicated by a wine jar inscribed with the king's prenomen found in Amenhotep II's funerary temple at Thebes; it is dated to this king's highest known date—his Year 26—and lists the name of the pharaoh's vintner, Panehsy. Mortuary temples were generally not stocked until the king died or was near death; therefore, Amenhotep may not have lived much later beyond his 26th year. There are alternate theories which attempt to assign him a reign of up to 35 years, which is the absolute maximum length he could have reigned. In this chronology, he reigned from 1454 to 1419. There are certain problems facing these theories which cannot be resolved. In particular, this would mean Amenhotep II died when he was 52, but an X-ray analysis of his mummy has shown him to have been around 40 when he died. Accordingly, Amenhotep II is usually given a reign of 26 years and said to have reigned from 1427 to 1401 BC.

However, it should be stressed that there are substantial gaps in clearly attested Year dates known for Amenhotep II's reign. The monumental evidence only "gives clear proof for Year 3, 4, 6, 7, 9 and 23 [of this ruler], hence it is not far-fetched to assume that the Year 26 [wine] amphora" does refer to this king's reign. This evidence alone shows that even a well known pharaoh who ruled Egypt for at least 25–26 years such as Amenhotep II had a long 14 year time gap in attested years between his 9th and 23rd regnal years. The only date that can indirectly be fitted into this large time gap to Amenhotep II is a Year 18 or possible Year 19 date based on Papyrus Leningrad (St. Petersburg) 1116A that lists grain allotments for a coming psdntyw feast and other occasion. While mentioning no king directly, the papyrus features early New Kingdom palaeography, mentions "Peru-Nefer (the "dockyard" and royal residence once thought to be near Memphis), and bears the prenomen of Akheperure" which was the royal name of Amenhotep II. These three facts combined, as Peter Der Manuelian writes,

"all speak for a secure dating. The papyrus may be chronologically pinpointed further to Amenhotep's eighteenth, nineteenth, or twentieth year. Line 19 of the text mentions an allotment on II smw 30 "from the grain of year 18," possibly indicating that the papyrus dates to year 19"

The Jewish historian Josephus, in his book Contra Apionem which translated Manetho's Aegyptiaca, assigns Amenhotep II, a certain Amenophis a reign of 30 years and 10 months. Therefore, it is eminently possible that Amenhotep II could have reigned for 5 years more after his Year 26 date given that Amenhotep II ruled unattested for more than a decade between his 9th and 23rd regnal years. Significantly, as the British Egyptologist David Aston writes "inscriptions at Karnak refer to both a Heb sed and a renewal of the Heb sed under Amenophis II, and since a king usually celebrated his first Heb sed festival in Year 30, and his second Year 34," these inscriptions may suggest a minimum reign of 30+ years for Amenhotep II.

Donald Redford, in contrast, in his 1986 book Pharaonic King Lists, Annals and Day Books, Mississauga, 1986, pp. 179–183, believes that Heb sed references recorded on the pillars of various Karnak monuments of Amenophis I, Tuthmosis III, Amenophis II and Tuthmosis IV are nothing but “pillar benedictions” being simply copies of those found on the pillars of the small bark temple of Sesostris I, and thus have no chronological worth. However, since Amenhotep II has a Year 26 inferred from a wine amphora, this pharaoh only had to rule for another 5 years or 8 years after his Year 26 to have a reign of 31 or 34 years which is quite possible since he ruled unattested in the historical records for 14 years between his 9th and 23rd regnal years.

Finally, modern X-ray evidence which suggests that Amenhotep II was around 40 at death may not account for a person's precise age at death more than 3,000 years ago. Amenhotep II's Great Sphinx Stela reveals that he was 18 years old when he became king. If one accepts that Amenhotep II had a short 2 year co-regency with his father Thutmose III at the beginning of his reign as Peter Der Manuelian notes, he would already be 42 years old at death (or 18 years plus a sole 24 year reign). But if Amenhotep II enjoyed a reign of 31 years as Josephus' copy of Manetho's Aegyptiaca assumes, then this king would have been about 47 years old at death (18 years plus a sole 29 year reign) and the X-ray evidence would be off by 7 years.

== Foreign affairs ==
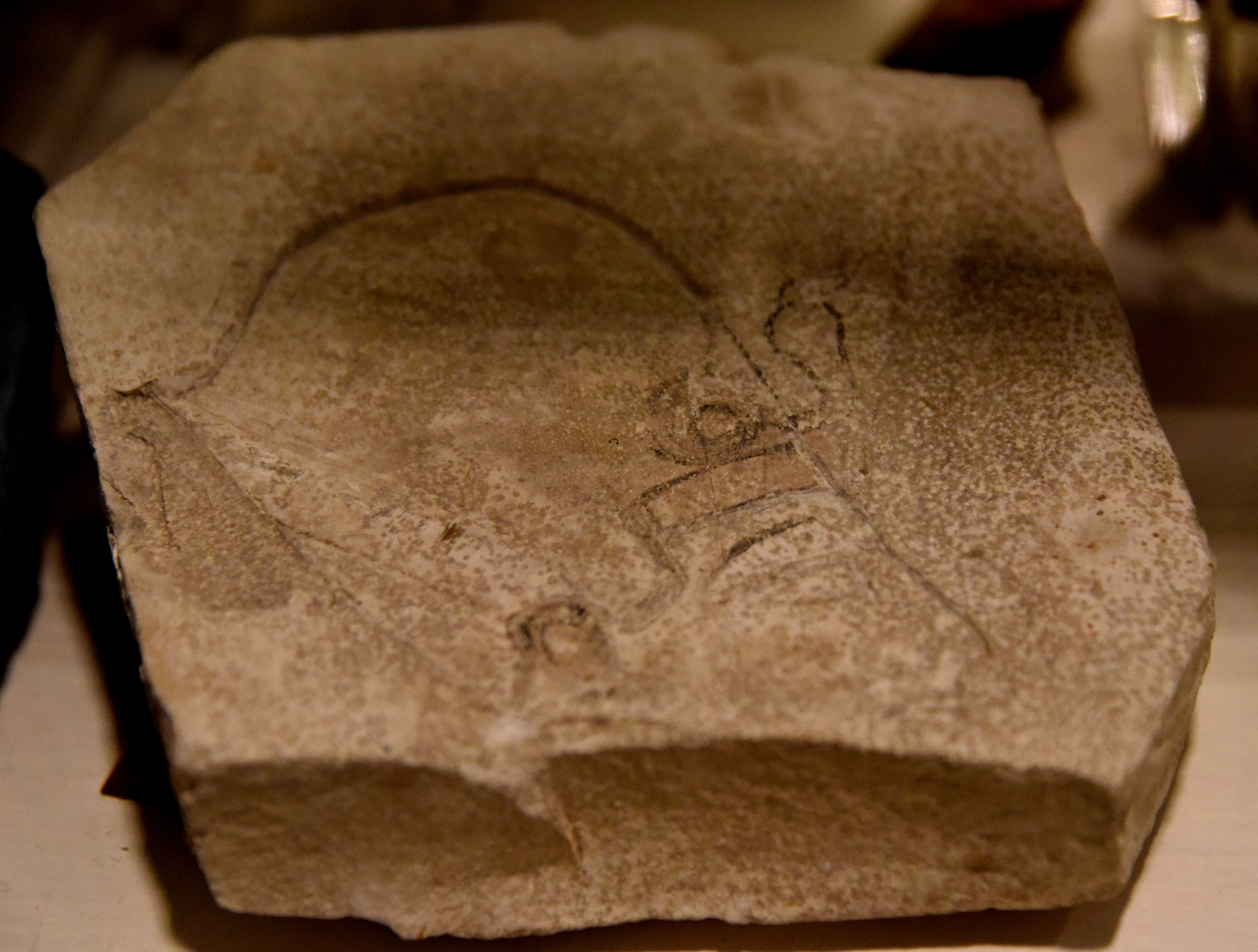
Limestone trial piece showing a king's head, who wears the blue crown. 18th Dynasty. From the Temple of Amenhotep II at Thebes, Egypt. Petrie Museum, London.

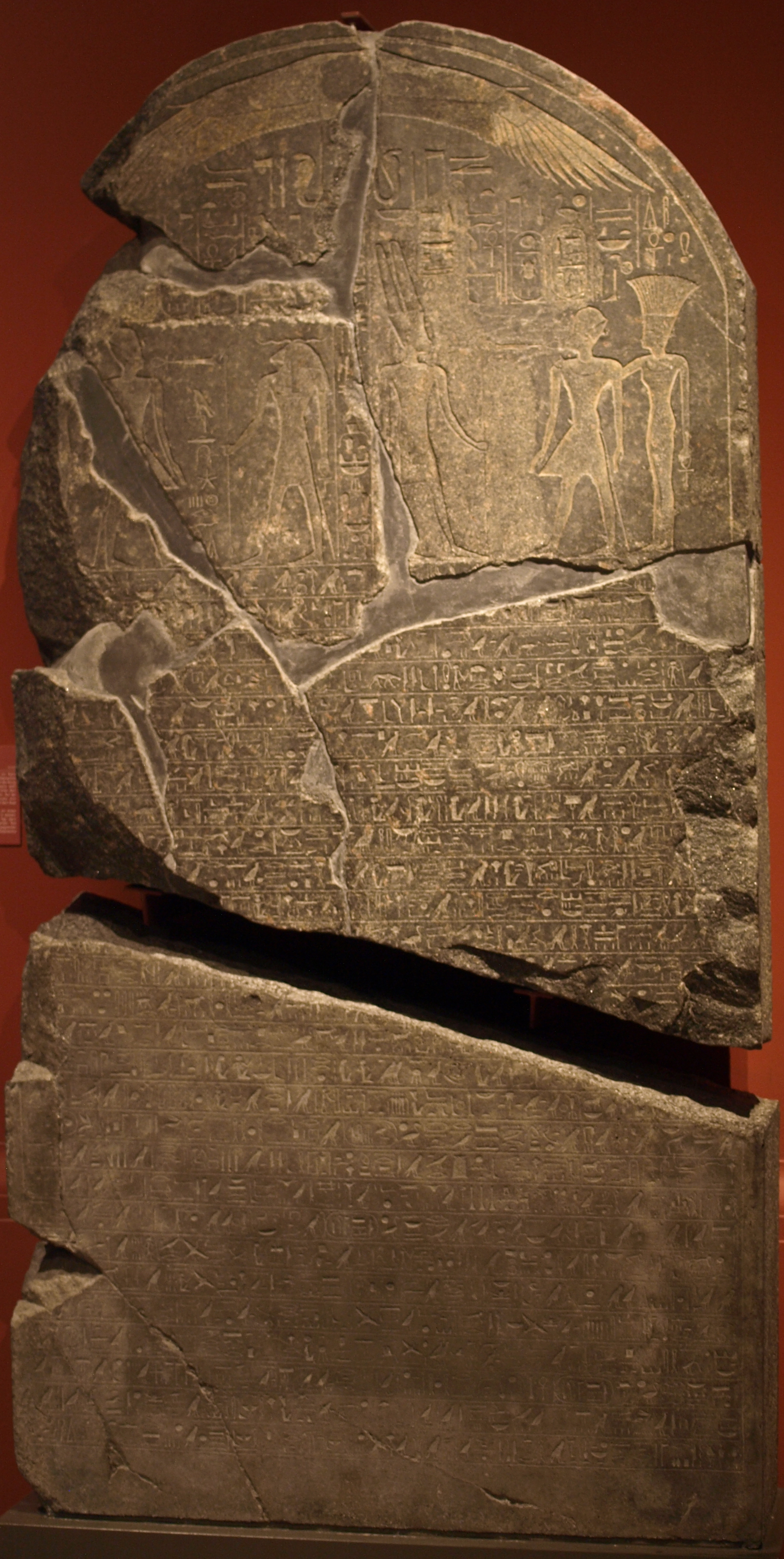
A stele, originally from Elephantine and now on display at the Kunsthistorisches Museum, Vienna, recording Amenhotep II's successful campaign against Syria, and dedicating war booty and prisoners to the Temple of Khnum

Amenhotep II's first campaign took place in his third regnal year. It is known that the pharaoh was attacked by the host of Qatna while crossing the Orontes River, but he emerged victorious and acquired rich booty, among which even the equipment of a Mitanni charioteer is mentioned. The pharaoh was well known for his physical prowess and is said to have singlehandedly killed seven rebel princes at Kadesh, which successfully terminated his first Syrian campaign on a victorious note. After the campaign, the king ordered the bodies of the seven princes to be hung upside down on the prow of his ship. Upon reaching Thebes, all but one of the princes were mounted on the city walls. The other was taken to the often rebellious territory of Nubia and hung on the city wall of Napata, as an example of the consequence of rising against the pharaoh and to demoralise any Nubian opponents of Egyptian authority there. Amenhotep II called this campaign his first in a Stele from Amada, however he also called his second campaign his first, causing some confusion. The most common solution for this, although not universally accepted, is that this was the first campaign he fought alone before the death of his father and thus before he was the sole king of Egypt, and he counted his second campaign as his first because it was the first that was his and his alone.

In April of his seventh year, Amenhotep II was faced with a major rebellion in Syria by the vassal states of Naharin and dispatched his army to the Levant to suppress it. This rebellion was likely instigated by Egypt's chief Near Eastern rival, Mitanni. His stele of victory carved after this campaign records no major battles, which has been read a number of ways. It may be that this campaign was more similar to one of the tours of Syria which his father had fought, and he only engaged minor garrisons in battle and forced cities to swear allegiance to him–oaths immediately broken after his departure. Alternatively, it appears that the two weeks when Amenhotep would have been closest to Mitanni are omitted from the stele, thus it is possible that his army was defeated on this campaign.

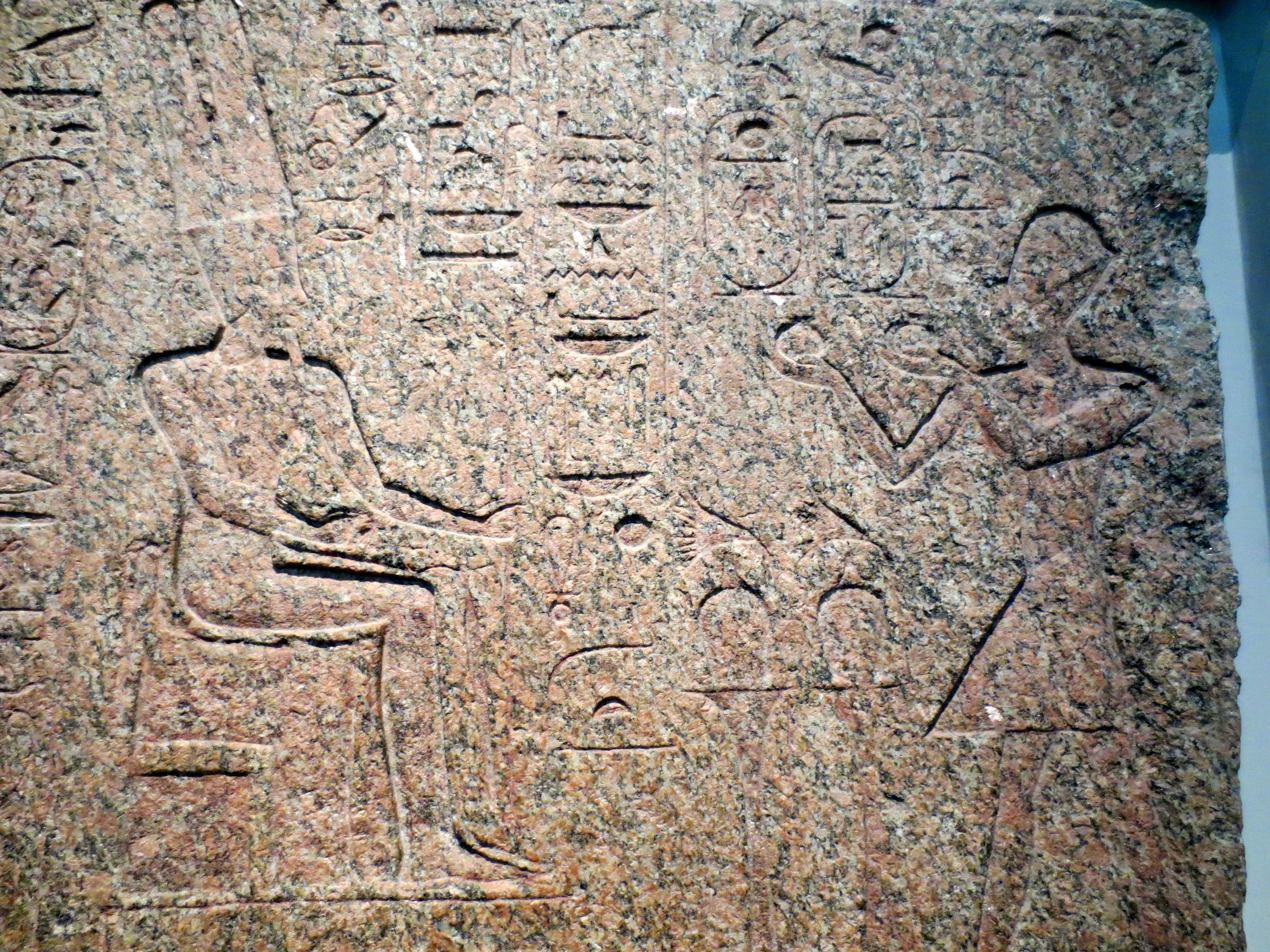
Red Granite, from the 18th Dynasty around 1430 BC. In the relief from Bubastis, and now at the British Museum, Amenhotep II is seen worshiping Amun. Also contains some text from Seti I of the 19th Dynasty.

Amenhotep's last campaign took place in his ninth year, however it apparently did not proceed farther north than the Sea of Galilee. According to the list of plunder from this campaign, Amenhotep II claims to have taken 101,128 slaves. These numbers however are difficult to substantiate, leading some to question the accuracy of Amenhotep II's court scribes. Others have suggested that such exaggerated figures may instead be simply due to compounded accounting mistakes. Examples include a possible recount of the 15,070 prisoners taken in his year 7 campaign in Nukhash being combined with the figures from his year 9 campaign.

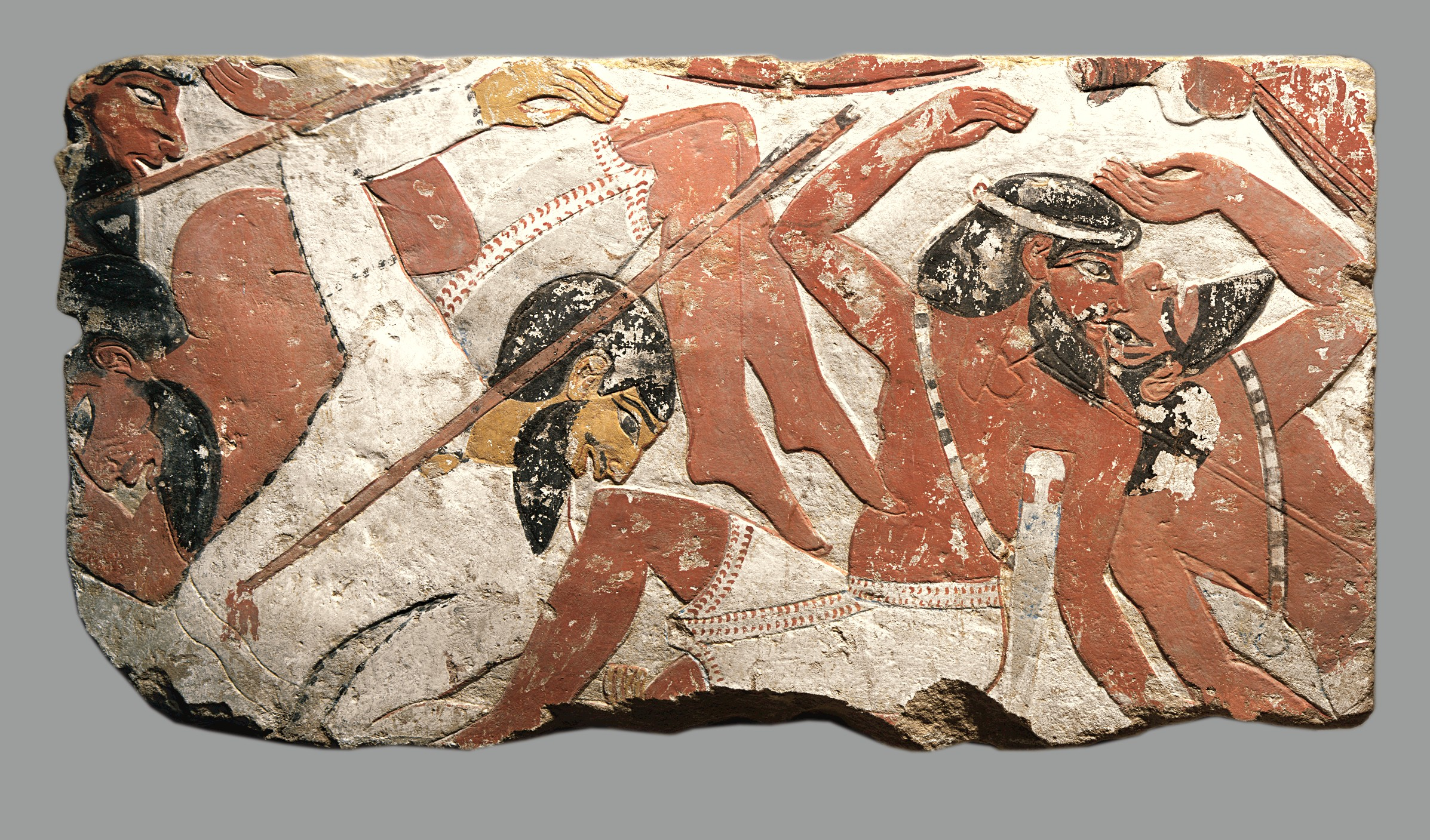
Egyptian relief depicting a battle against West Asiatics. Reign of Amenhotep II, 18th Dynasty, c. 1427–1400 BC.

After the campaign in Amenhotep II's ninth year, Mitanni sought to make peace with Egypt, and from then on, their armies never fought again. Amenhotep II records that the kings of Babylon, the Hittites, and Mitanni came to make peace and pay tribute to him after his ninth year, although this may be outlandish boasting. However, a second passage appears on the walls of Karnak, saying that the princes of Mitanni came to seek peace with Amenhotep II, and this cannot be so easily explained away. The rising power of the Hittites eventually persuaded Mitanni to seek an ally, and there was definitely a treaty of some sort between Egypt and Mitanni by the time of Amenhotep II's successor, but it may be that it was enacted after Amenhotep II's campaigns, to try to prevent any more campaigns of mass deportations. Whenever formal peace was enacted, an informal peace was maintained between Amenhotep II and the king of Mitanni. The new peace ties between the two benefitted both nations. For Mitanni, relaxing military conflict with Egypt to its south allowed it to focus more on the rising powers of Hittite and Assyria. For Egypt, it was able to begin extracting significant amounts of resources from Syria and Canaan and it was also now able to access Mediterranean trade routes with the Aegean Sea. Thereafter, Amenhotep II concentrated on domestic matters, with one possible exception. A shrine of Amenhotep II's Nubian viceroy shows Amenhotep II receiving tribute after a Nubian campaign, but it is not possible to date when this happened.

== Construction projects ==
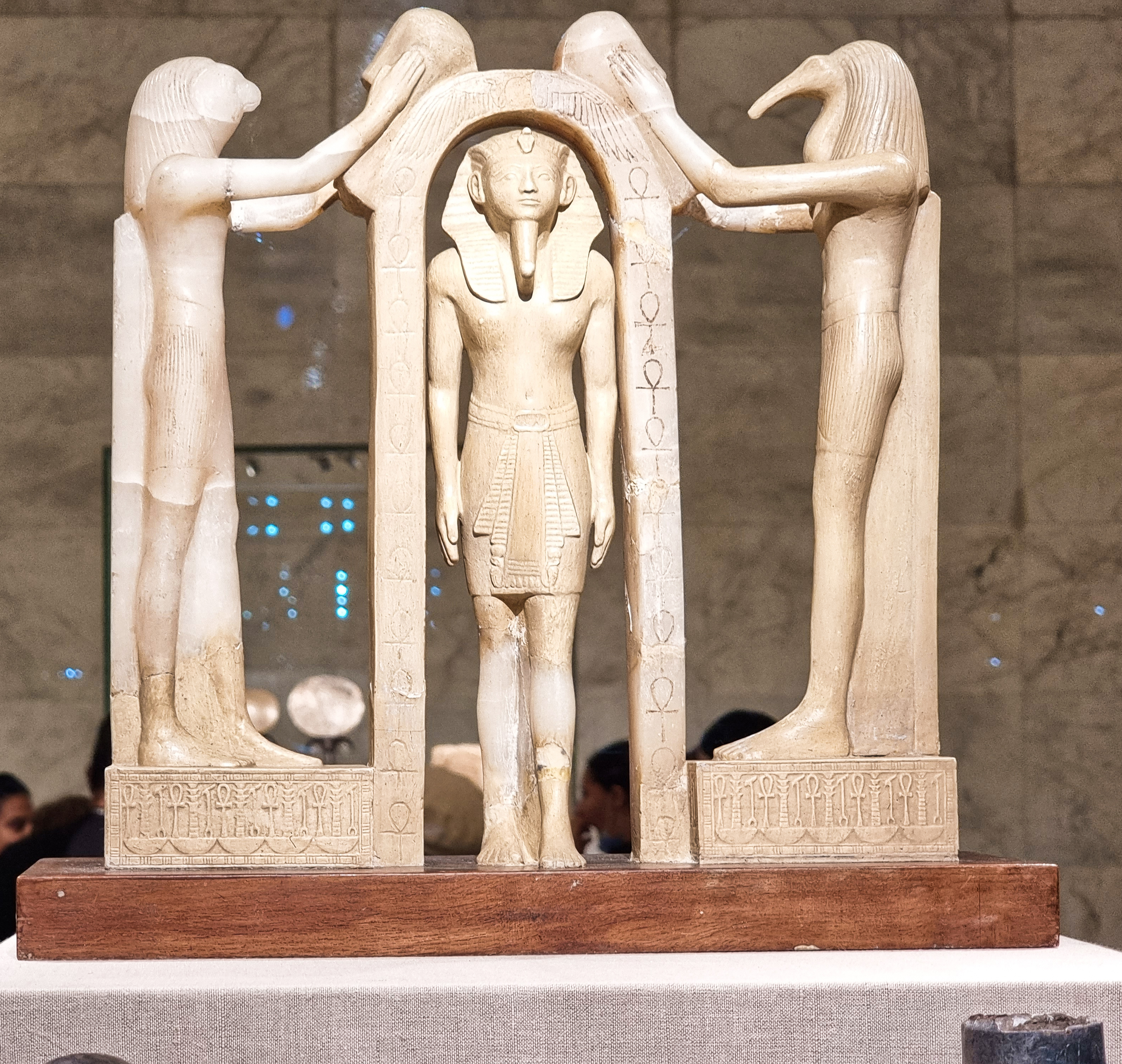
The gods Horus (left) and Thoth (right; possibly modified from Set) purifying Amenhotep II in this statue, National Museum of Egyptian Civilization

Since Thutmose III had devoted so much energy to expanding Karnak, Amenhotep II's building projects were largely focused on enlarging smaller temples all over Egypt. In the Delta, his father's Overseer of Works, Minmose, is attested from an inscription at Tura as overseeing construction of more temples. In southern Egypt, small shrines are attested at Medamud, el-Tod, and Armant. Karnak, despite not receiving the attention given it by his father, also was not totally neglected. He commissioned a column to stand in the courtyard between the fourth and fifth pylons commemorating the reception of tribute from Mitanni. In Nubia, Amenhotep II built at Qasr Ibrim and Semna, and ordered the decoration of the Temple at Kalabsha. However, his most famous Nubian temple was at Amada. Thutmose III had begun constructing a temple which, technically, was dedicated to Horus there, although the presence of Re-Harakhti and Amun-Re is easily observed. Amenhotep II completed it and put in it the record of his year 3 campaign on a stele, which was until 1942 the source of most information about Amenhotep's wars.

He had a mortuary temple constructed at the edge of the cultivation in the Theban Necropolis, close to where the Ramesseum was later built, but it was destroyed in ancient times.

== Personality and later life ==
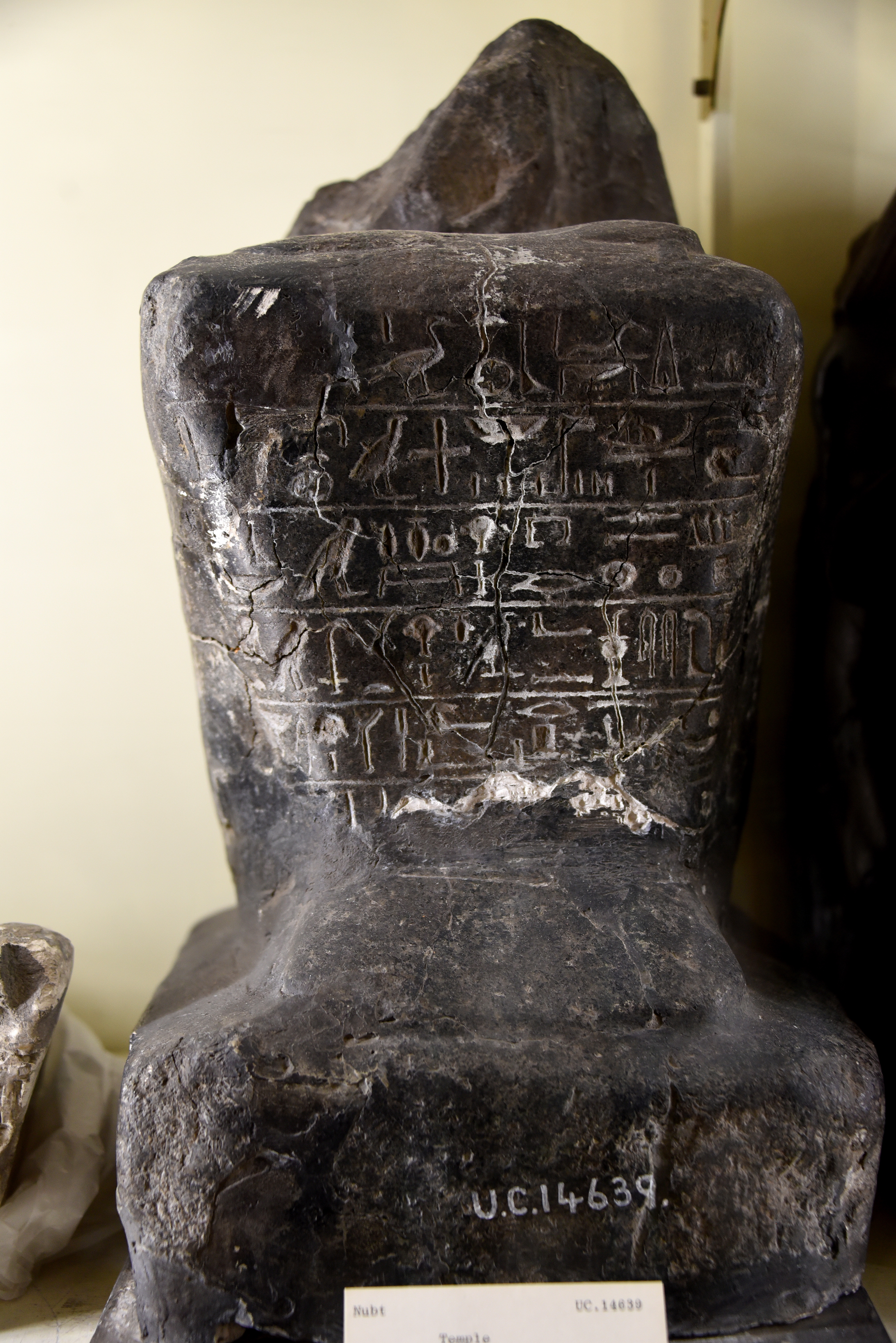
Black granite, seated statue of Sennefer with cartouche of Amenhotep (Amenophis) II on right arm. From the temple of Set at Naqqada, Egypt. Petrie Museum, London.

A stela from this pharaoh's final years highlights his openly contemptuous attitude towards non-Egyptians. The document, which dates to "Year 23 IV Akhet [day] 1, the day of the festival" of Amenhotep II's accession to power, is a copy of a personal letter which the king composed himself to Usersatet, his viceroy of Kush (Nubia). In it, Amenhotep II reminded Usersatet of their military exploits together in Syria and proceeds to criticize the way this official conducted his office as Viceroy. Amenhotep II writes:

Copy of the order which His Majesty wrote himself, with his own hand, to the viceroy Usersatet. His Majesty was in the [royal] Residence...he spent a holiday sitting and drinking. Look, this order of the king is brought to you...who are in faraway Nubia, a hero who brought booty from all foreign countries, a charioteer...you (are) master of a wife from Babylon and a maidservant from Byblos, a young girl from Alalakh and an old woman from Arapkha. Now, these people from Tekshi (Syria) are worthless--what are they good for? Another message for the viceroy: Do not trust the Nubians, but beware of their people and their witchcraft. Take this servant of a commoner, for example, whom you made an official although he is not an official whom you should have suggested to His Majesty; or did you want to allude to the proverb: 'If you lack a gold battle-axe inlaid with bronze, a heavy club of acacia wood will do'? So, do not listen to their words and do not heed their messages!"

Usersatet was so impressed (or fearful) of Amenhotep II's message that he ordered a copy of it to be engraved on a stela "that was once [located] at the Second Cataract [in Nubia] and is now in Boston."

Amenhotep II did not openly record the names of his queens; some Egyptologists theorize that he felt that women had become too powerful under titles such as God's Wife of Amun. They point to the fact that he participated in his father's removal of Hatshepsut's name from her monuments and the destruction of her image.

The destruction of Hatshepsut's images began during the co-regency of Amenhotep II when his father was very old, but stopped during his reign. However, the king may have harbored his father's concern that another woman would sit on the throne. Despite his efforts however it is possible that a female co-regent of Akhenaten ruled as pharaoh before the end of his own 18th dynasty.

Amenhotep II adopted a large number of Canaanite gods into the Egyptian pantheon, including Resheph, Hauron, Baal, Astarte, Qetesh, and a few others.

== Death and burial ==
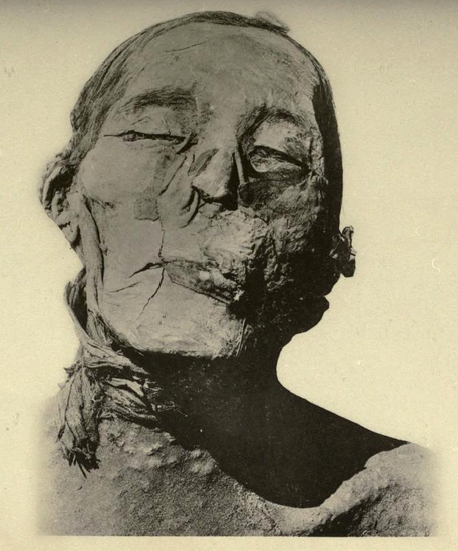
The face of the mummy of Amenhotep II in 1902

Amenhotep II was interred in his KV35 tomb in the Valley of the Kings; his mummy was found there within his original sarcophagus when the tomb was discovered in March 1898 by Victor Loret. The tomb also housed a mummy cache containing several New Kingdom pharaohs including Thutmose IV, Seti II, Ramesses III, Ramesses IV, and Ramesses VI. They had been re-buried in Amenhotep II's tomb by the 21st Dynasty High Priest of Amun, Pinedjem II, during Siamun's reign, to protect them from tomb robbers.

Also found buried in his tomb was the mummy of his son Webensenu who died as a teenager.

=== Mummy ===
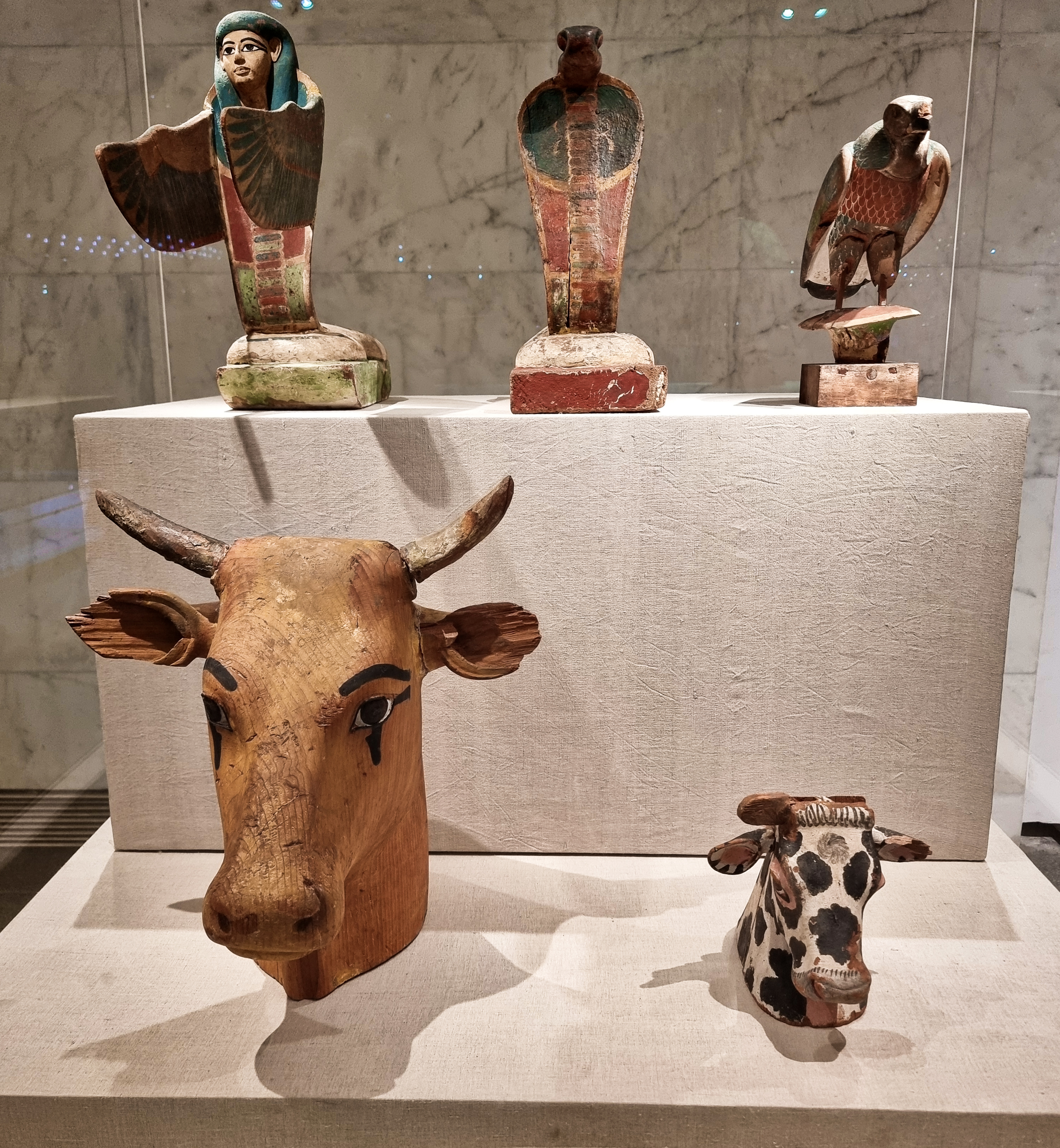
A set of Protective goddesses found in the KV35 tomb of pharaoh Amenhotep II in Western Thebes, 18th dynasty period now at the National Museum of Egyptian Civilization in Cairo

The mummy of the king was first examined, described, and photographed in January 1902 by Gaston Maspero in the company of Howard Carter, Friedrich Bissing, and Pierre Lacau. The Australian anatomist Grafton Smith examined Amenhotep II's mummy in 1907. During this examination the linen still adhering to the face was removed for an unobstructed view. He found the body to be 1.67 metres (5.5 ft) tall and noted a strong facial resemblance to his son, Thutmose IV. The wavy brown hair present on his head is "abundantly interspersed with white." The arms are crossed low over the chest, with the right hand tightly clenched and the left less so. Unusually, the skin all over the body is covered with small tubercles though Smith could not say if they were the result of the embalming process or disease (likely disease since no other king's mummies display them). Resin on the body preserved the impressions of jewellery; several rows of a beaded collar were present on the upper back, and a diamond-shaped geometric pattern seen on the back of the hips. Smith estimated he was 40 to 50 at death based on his worn teeth and greying hair. His cause of death is unknown. His mummy has the inventory number CG 61069.

In April 2021, his mummy was moved from the Egyptian Museum to the National Museum of Egyptian Civilization along with those of 17 other kings and four queens in an event termed the Pharaohs' Golden Parade.

== Ancestry ==
Ancestors of Amenhotep II

Thutmose I
Thutmose II
Mutnofret
Thutmose III
Iset
Amenhotep II
Merytre-Hatshepsut

== Gallery ==
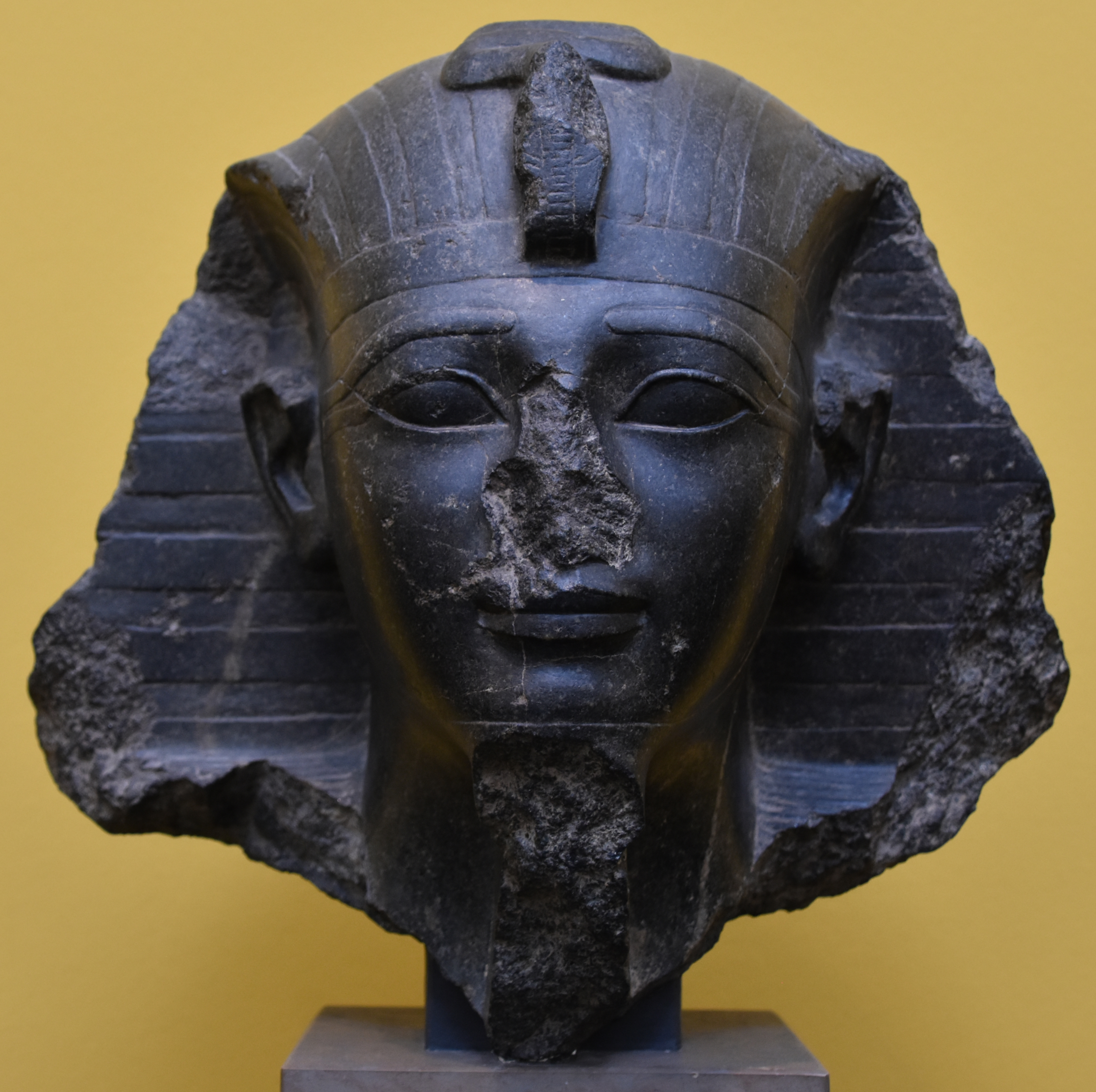
Statue of Amenhotep II in the Ny Carlsberg Glyptotek, Copenhagen

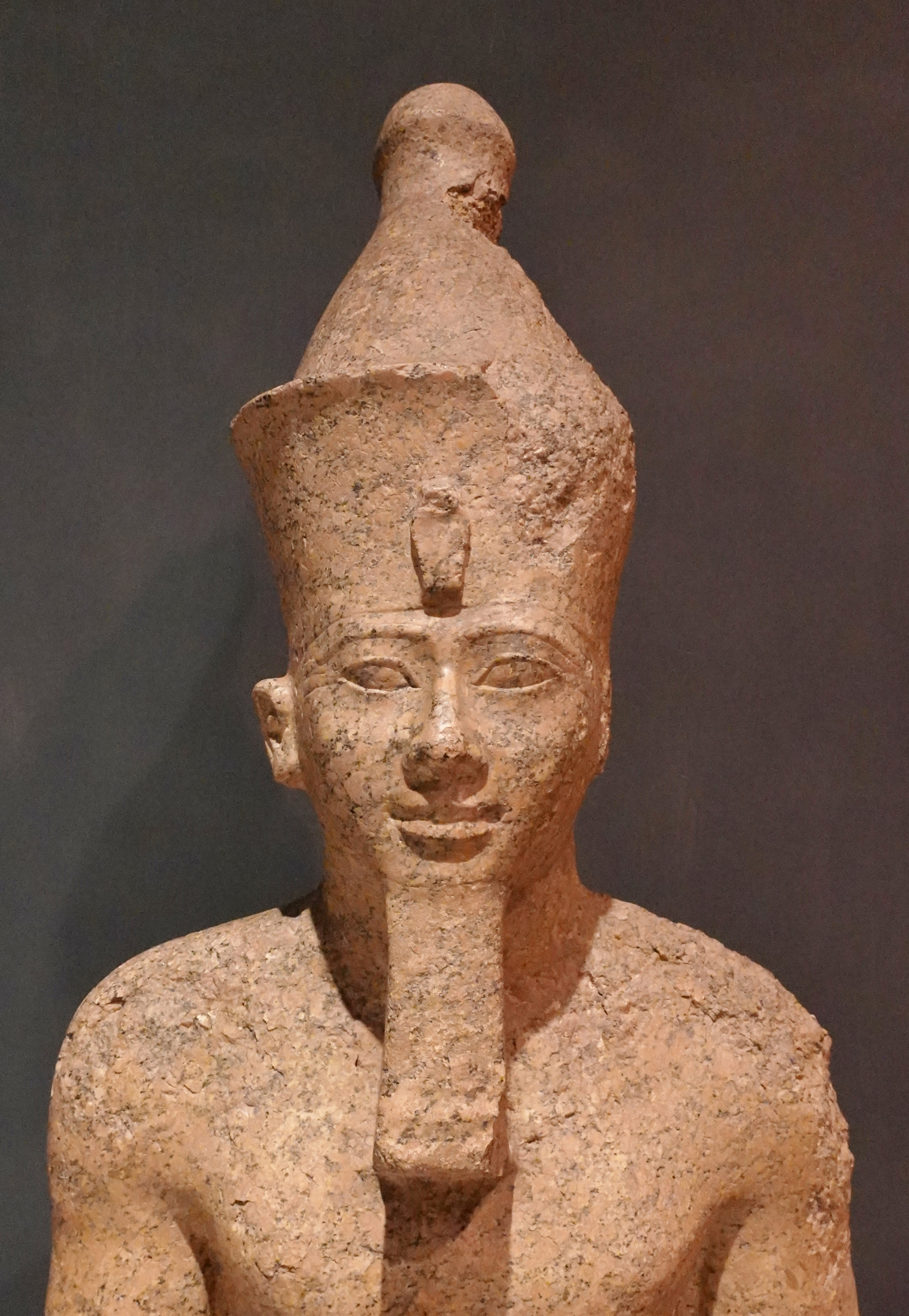
Granite Statue of Amenhotep II in the Luxor Museum, Luxor

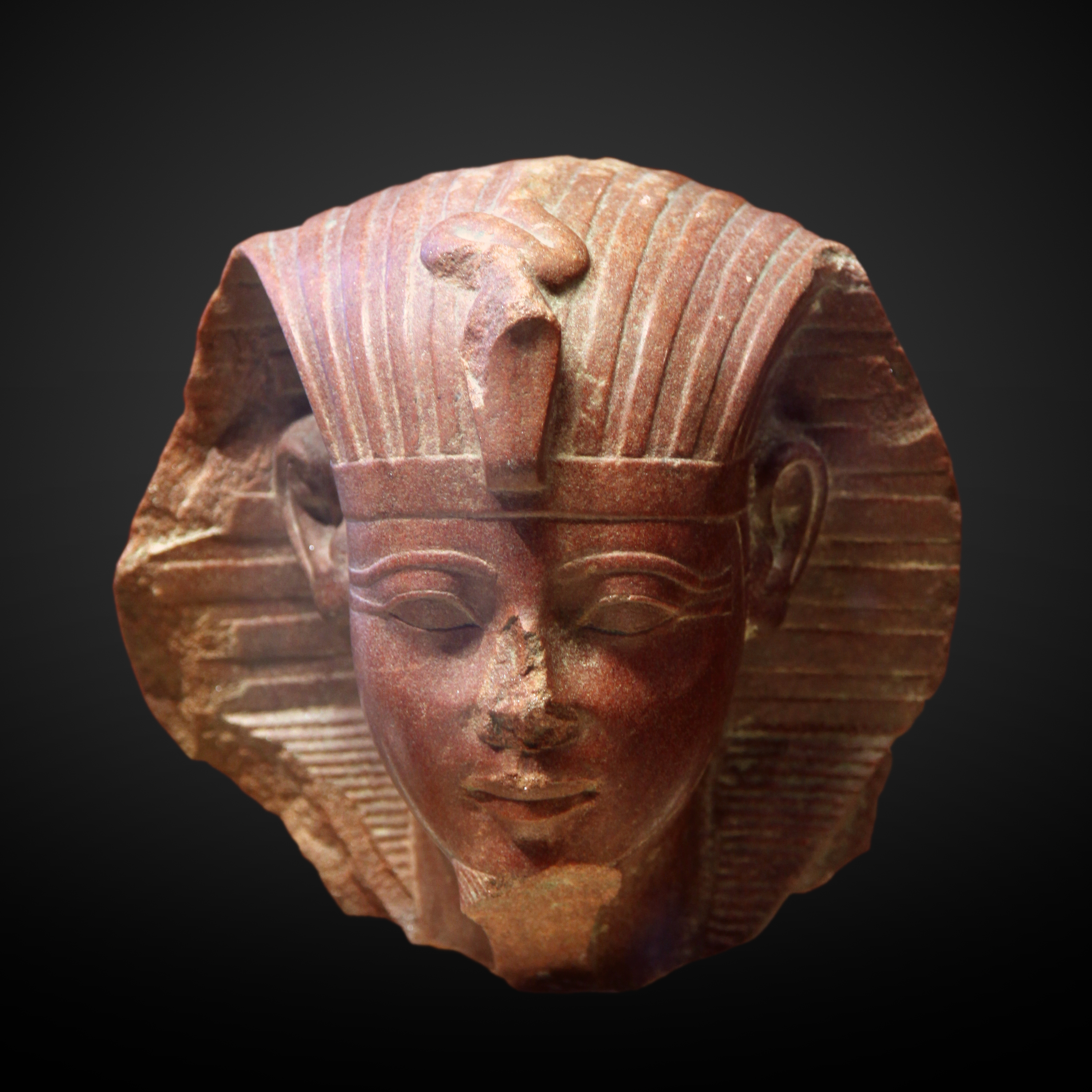
Sphinx head of a young Amenhotep II, Musée du Louvre

Sitting statue of Amenhotep II in Karnak

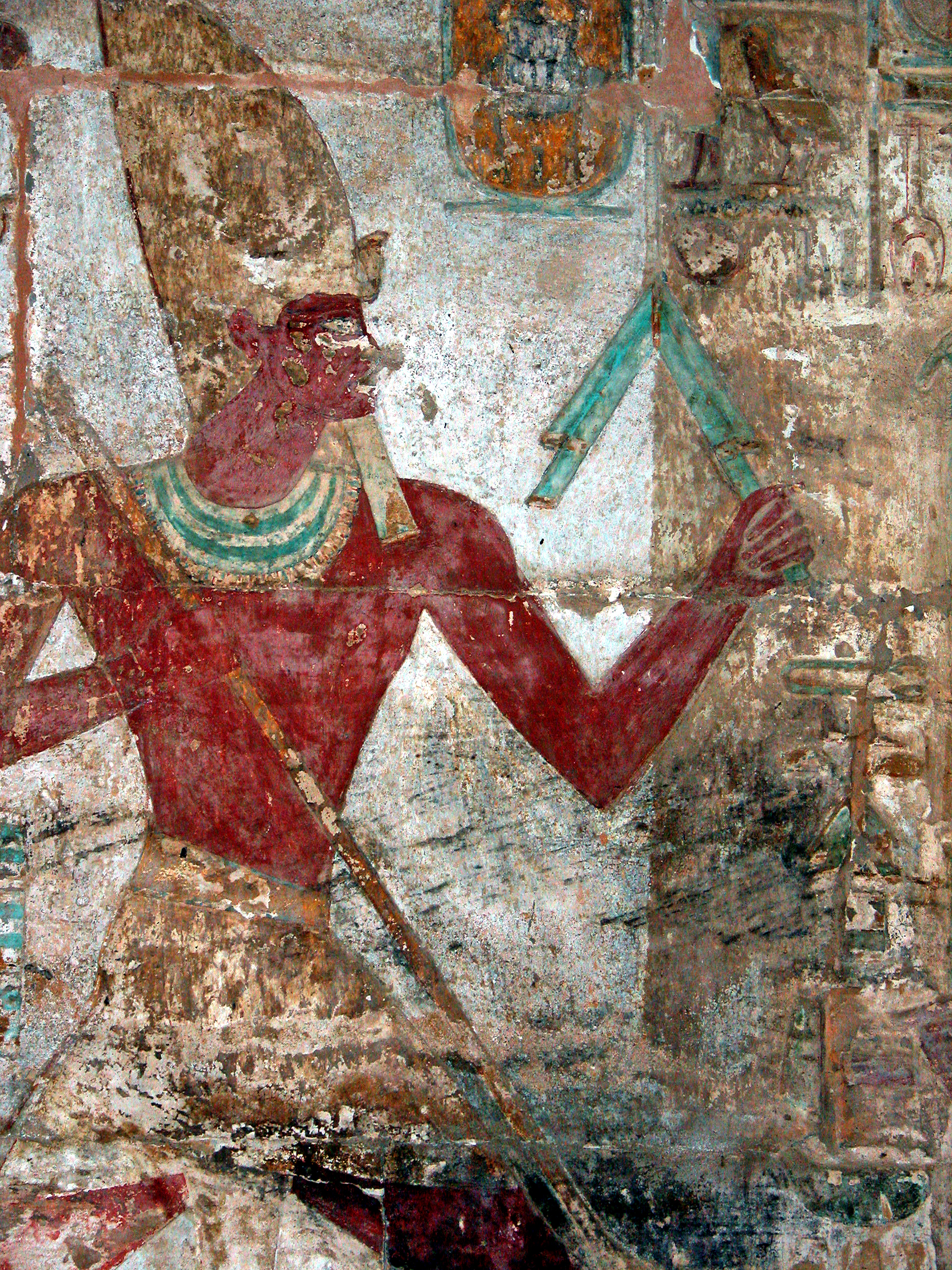
Amenhotep II shown at the Temple of Amada, Lake Nasser, Egypt

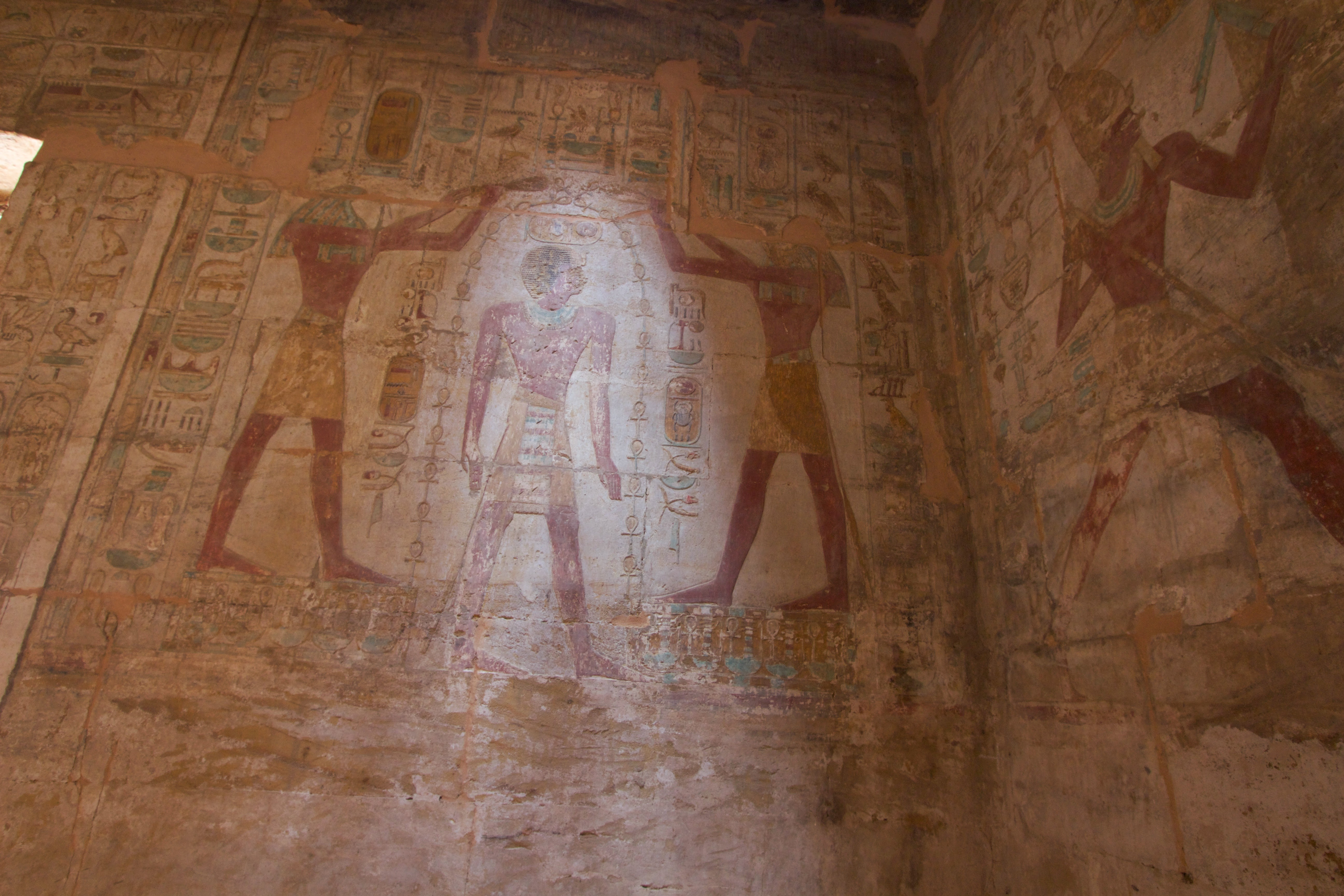
Interior detail of the Temple of Amada depicting Amenhotep II with natural spotlight

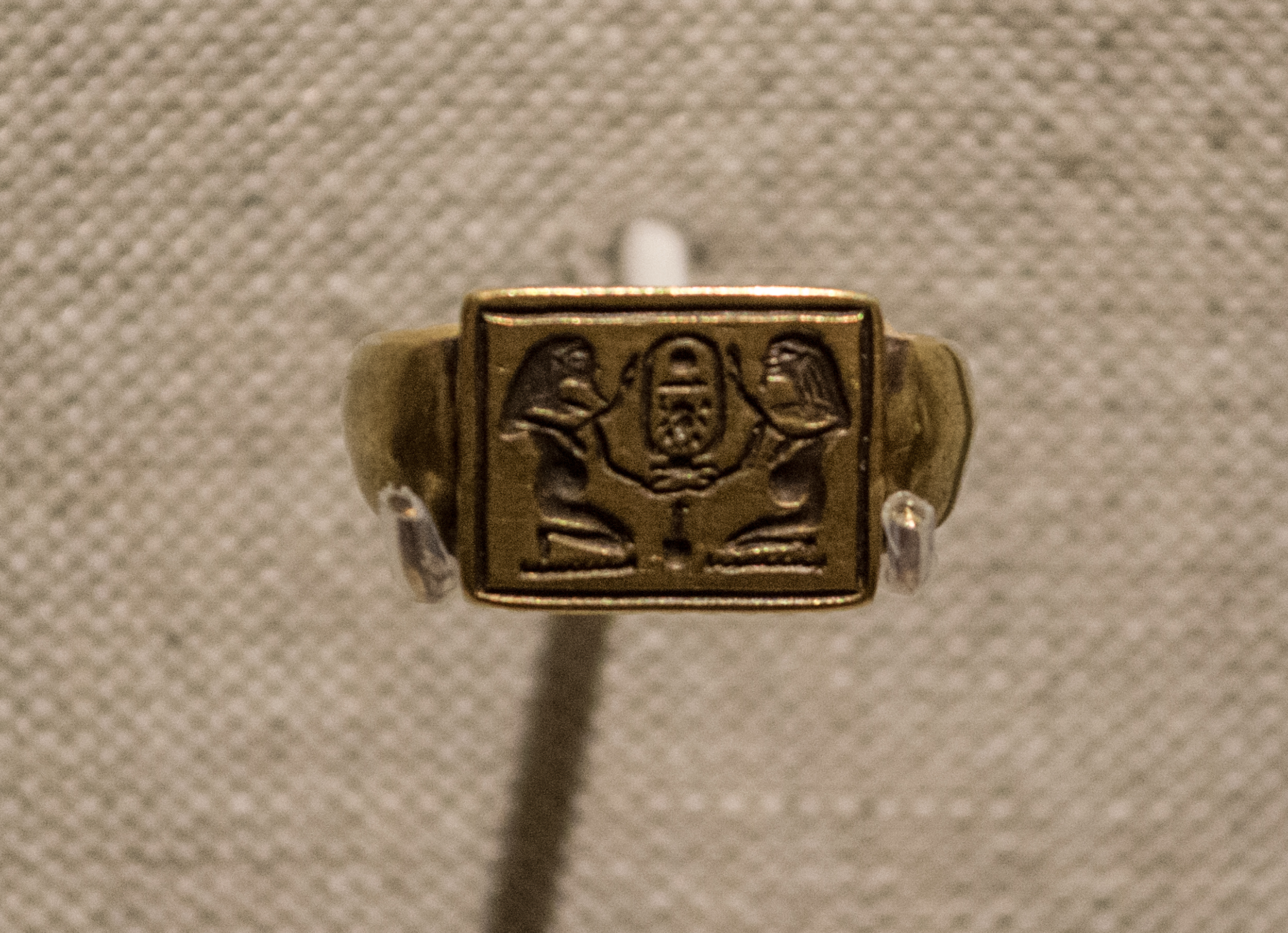
A signet ring with the cartouche of Amenhotep II

== See also ==
- Eighteenth dynasty of Egypt Family Tree
- History of ancient Egypt
- List of pharaohs
