= Mutemwiya =

Wife of Thutmose IV

- King's mother
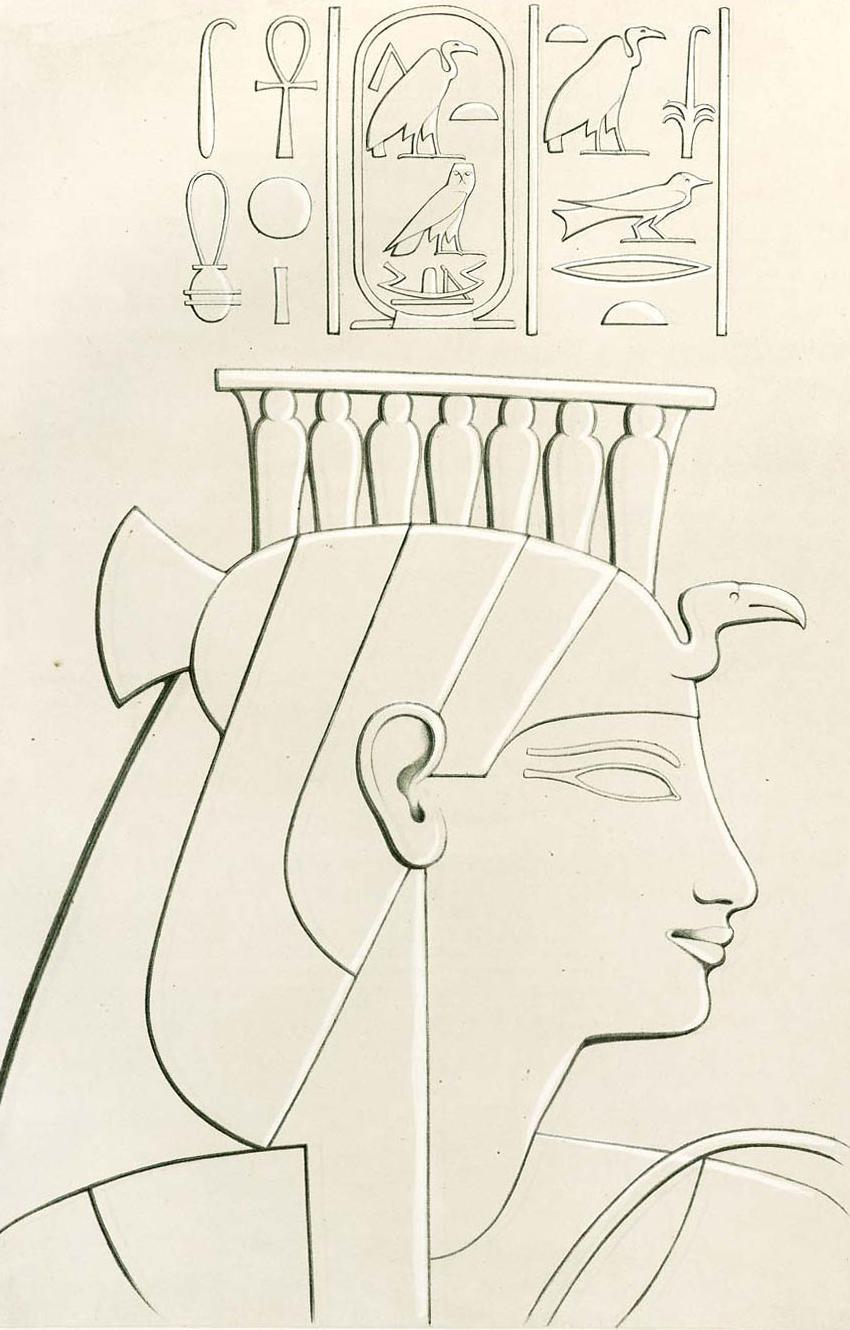
- Mutemwiya in relief at a Luxor temple
- Spouse: Thutmose IV
- Issue: Amenhotep III

Mutemwiya in hieroglyphs
< X1 G14 G17 P3 >
Mwt m wjꜣ
Mut in the divine barque

Mutemwiya (also written as Mutemwia, Mutemuya or Mutemweya) was a minor wife of the Eighteenth Dynasty pharaoh Thutmose IV, and the mother of Pharaoh Amenhotep III. Mutemwiya's name means "Mut in the divine barque". While unconfirmed, it has been suggested that she acted as regent during the minority of her son Amenhotep III's reign.

== Biography ==
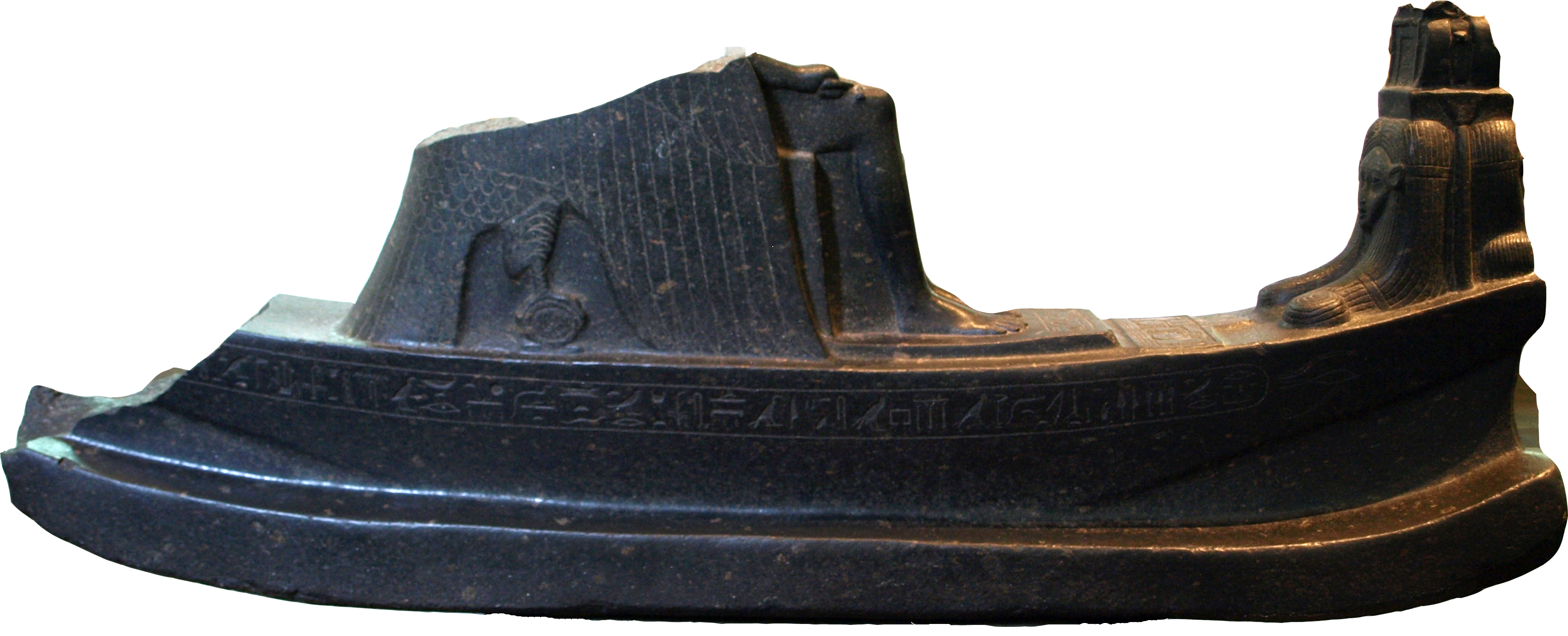
Statue of a sacred boat dedicated to Mutemwiya, circa 1400 BC, black granite from the Temple of Karnak, on display at the British Museum

Mutemwiya is not attested during the reign of her husband Thutmose IV. She would have been overshadowed at court by the chief queens Nefertari, and later Iaret. Mutemwiya is only shown on the monuments of her son Amenhotep III.

While she occasionally was identified by some researchers as a daughter of King Artatama I of Mitanni, no evidence proves that she is the same person, and nothing about her own background is known. There seemed to be evidence that she was not a daughter of Artatama, and the hypothesis has now been completely discarded. This theory can be refuted by chronology alone: the Mitanni princess married Thutmose IV during his reign, but Mutemwiya gave birth to the future successor Amenhotep III before Thutmose IV even ascended to the throne as pharaoh. This Mitannian princess might have been Henutempet, who could have held the title of The Noble Lady of Mitanni. Cyril Aldred has suggested that Mutemwiya be a sister of Yuya. He argues that since Mutemwiya was present during the early years of her son's reign, she might have engineered the marriage between Tiye and the young king to connect her family with royalty. However, this theory is poorly supported by texts or archaeological finds.

However, recent research has proven that Amenhotep III shared one-third of his genetic material with his father-in-law Yuya, suggesting that Yuya was likely Amenhotep III's uncle. Yet it is virtually inconceivable that Yuya was a brother of Thutmose IV, making it more likely instead that that Yuya was the brother of Mutemwiya. Beyond this, KV21A has been identified through DNA comparison as a sister of Yuya and is considered a possible candidate for Mutemwiya, though this remains uncertain.

Mutemwiya held many titles including Lady of The Two Lands (nb.t-tAwy), Great King’s Wife, his beloved (Hm.t-nsw-wr.t mry.t=f), noblewoman (r.t-pa.t), countess, Great of Praises (wr.t-Hsw.t), Sweet of Love (bnr.t-mrw.t), Mistress of Upper and Lower Egypt (Hnw.t-rsy-mHw), and God's Mother (mwt-nTr). The titles king's mother and god's mother amount to the same thing since the god in question was the reigning king, Amenhotep III. All of these titles, including that of Great Royal Wife, were used only after her husband's death, during her son's reign. At the time of Amenhotep III’s accession to the throne she gained prominence as the new pharaoh's mother.

Mutemwiya is shown in the Luxor temple, in scenes depicting the divine birth of her son Amenhotep III. The scenes resemble (and in some cases copy) scenes of the divine birth of Hatshepsut in Deir el-Bahari. Hatshepsut had used the birth story to reinforce her claims to the throne. Amenhotep was the son of a ruling pharaoh and it seems that the birth scene is used to stress the semi-divine nature of Amenhotep III. In a key scene Mutemwiya is shown seated on a bed receiving the god Amun who had taken the form of her husband Thutmose IV. They are in the presence of the goddesses Selket and Neith. The scenes show Amenhotep III to be the result of the union of his mother with the god Amun himself. A pregnant queen Mutemwiya as later shown being led to the birthing room by Isis and Khnum.

A partial granite statue representing Mutemwiya was found in Karnak and it now is in the collection of the British Museum. The statue takes the form of a rebus showing the goddess Mut seated in a barque, thereby forming her name. Mutemwiya is named in the inscription on the side of the barque.

Along with her daughter-in-law, Tiye, she also is shown on the Colossi of Memnon erected by Amenhotep III.

== Death ==
The date of Mutemwiya's death is unknown, but she is believed to have survived long into her son's reign. The evidence for that is her presence among the sculptures of the Colossi of Memnon, which was built well into his reign, as well as a mention of her estate on a wine-jar label found in Amenhotep III's Malkata palace in Thebes.

=== Possible mummy ===
Female mummy labelled KV21a is usually identified as genetic mother of Pharaoh Tutankhamun's two daughters, thus presumably Queen Ankhesenamun; however, Marc Gabolde suggested an alternative interpretation of the DNA results, according to which KV21a is instead Mutemiwya (who is also the two princesses ancestor, as their great-great-grandmother). Juan Belmonte dismissed this theory, calling it "interesting, possible but with very low probability".

== See also ==
- Eighteenth dynasty of Egypt Family Tree
