= Khaemwaset (18th dynasty) =

Ancient Egyptian prince

- Prince
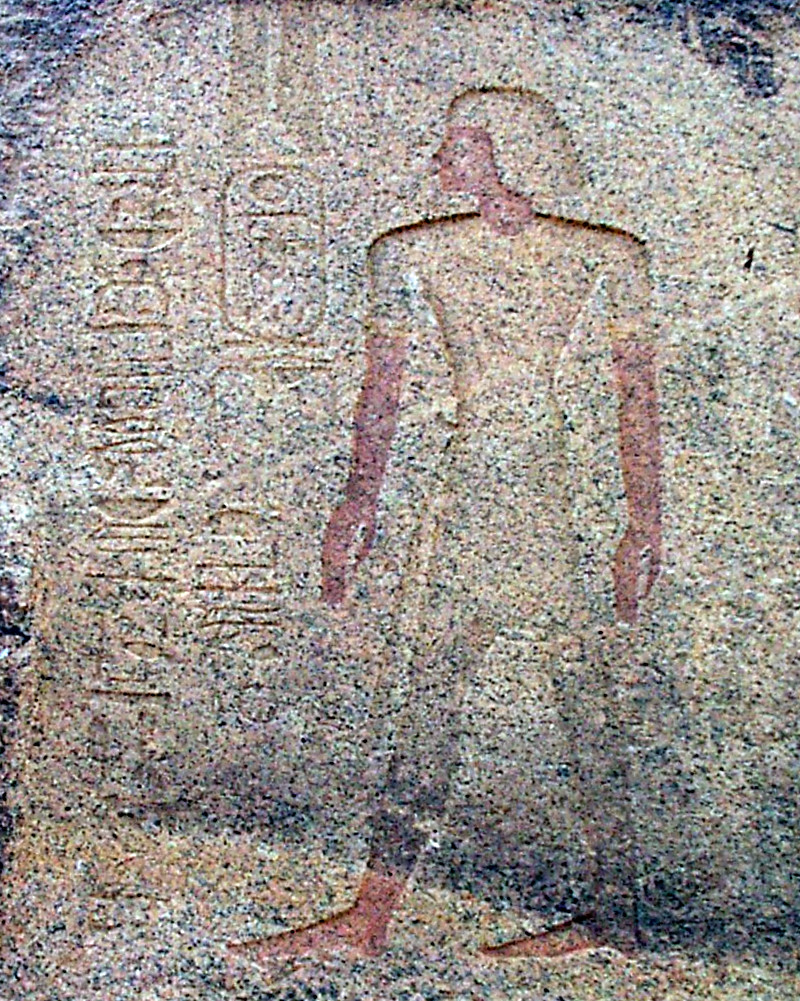
- Relief of Khaemwaset facing the cartouche of Amenhotep II, from Sehel Island
Egyptian name
N28 D36 Y1 G17 R19 X1 O49
- Dynasty: 18th Dynasty
- Father: Amenhotep II?

Khaemwaset was an ancient Egyptian prince of the 18th Dynasty. He is likely to have been a son of pharaoh Amenhotep II.

He is mentioned on two graffiti on the Sehel Island along with the throne name of Amenhotep II. One of the graffiti depicting the prince is mistakenly thought to depict Senenmut by locals.

Khaemwaset is titled Overseer of cattle, which was a rare title for a prince.
