= Amenemopet (prince) =

18th dynasty Egyptian prince

i mn n Aa15 O45
Amenemopet
in hieroglyphs
Era: New Kingdom
(1550–1069 BC)

Amenemopet was an ancient Egyptian prince during the 18th Dynasty, most likely a son of Pharaoh Amenhotep II.

He is known from the so-called Stela C, found in the Sphinx temple of Amenhotep II. He is identified as a son of this pharaoh based on the stela, which is stylistically datable to the reign of Amenhotep II. It is possible that he is the Prince Amenemopet shown on the stela of the royal nurse Senetruiu, suggesting that he was notable enough in that period to be depicted outside strictly royal tomb inscriptions.
