= Iset (queen) =

Iset (Isis)
- Queen consort of Egypt; Great Royal Wife
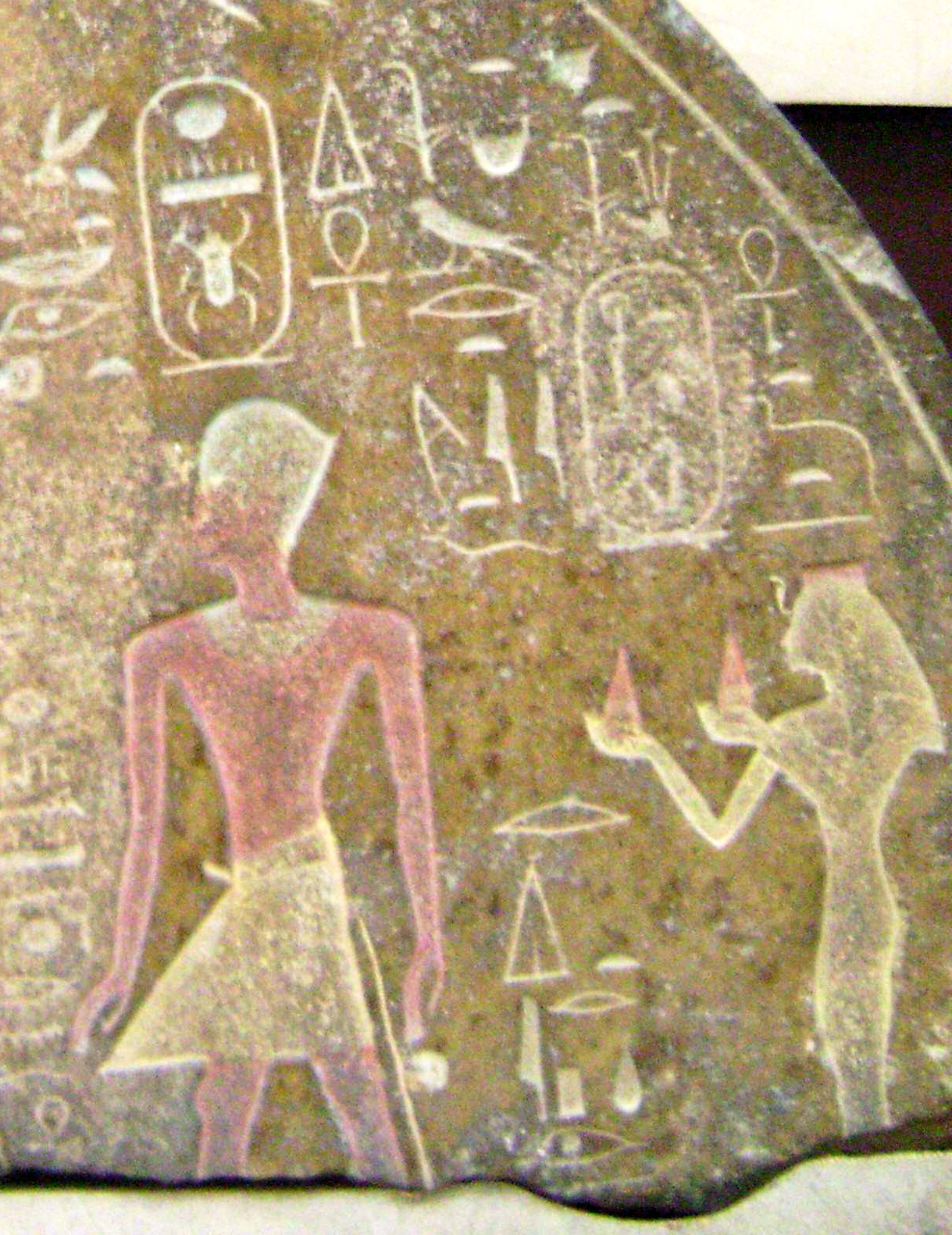
- Queen Isis behind her son Tuthmosis III
- Burial: Thebes?
- Spouse: Tuthmosis II
- Issue: Tuthmosis III
Egyptian name
st t H8
- Dynasty: 18th of Egypt
- Religion: Ancient Egyptian religion

Iset (or Isis) was a queen of the Eighteenth Dynasty of Egypt, and she was named after goddess Isis. She was a secondary wife or concubine of Thutmose II.

== Biography ==
Iset was the mother of Thutmose III, the only son of Thutmose II. Her son died on 11 March 1425 BC and her name is mentioned on his mummy bandages and a statue found in Karnak.

Although in these later instances Iset is referred to as Great Royal Wife, during the reign of Thutmose II the great royal wife was Hatshepsut. Thutmose II died in 1479 BC and, after his death, Hatshepsut became regent for the young king Thutmose III. Thutmose III became the head of the armies of Egypt as he grew up.

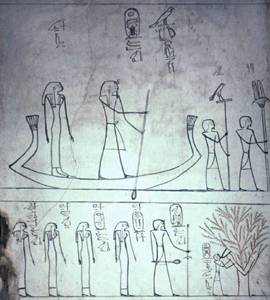
Thutmose III and his family from his tomb KV34. On the boat: Menkheperre Thutmose III and his mother Iset.

Hatshepsut ruled as pharaoh until her death in 1458 BC when her co-regent, Thutmose III, became pharaoh. At that time Iset received the title of "King's Mother" (since her son had become pharaoh) and she may then have been designated as a royal wife if she had not been previously when he was the co-regent.

At the time Thutmose III became pharaoh Neferure, the daughter of Hatshepsut and Thutmose II, was the God's Wife. She had served in this role throughout the reign of her mother as pharaoh. Neferure may have married Thutmose III but the sole evidence for this marriage is a stela showing Queen Satiah whose name may have been carved over that of another queen. The great royal wife, Merytre-Hatshepsut, became the mother of his successor.

Her son Tuthmosis III depicts his mother several times in his tomb in the Valley of the Kings. In KV34 there are depictions of the king with several female family members on one of the pillars. His mother Queen Isis is prominently featured.

Queen Isis is depicted behind her son on the boat. She is labeled as the King's Mother Isis. In the register below the boat Tuthmosis III is shown approaching a tree which is a representation of his mother Isis. Behind the king we see three of his wives: Queens Merytre, Sitiah, Nebtu and his daughter Nefertari.

It is not certain whether Iset was a concubine or a secondary wife of Thutmose II. She also received the title "God's Wife", but probably only posthumously.
