= Tiaa =

Ancient Egyptian queen consort

- Queen consort of Egypt; Great Royal Wife; King's Mother
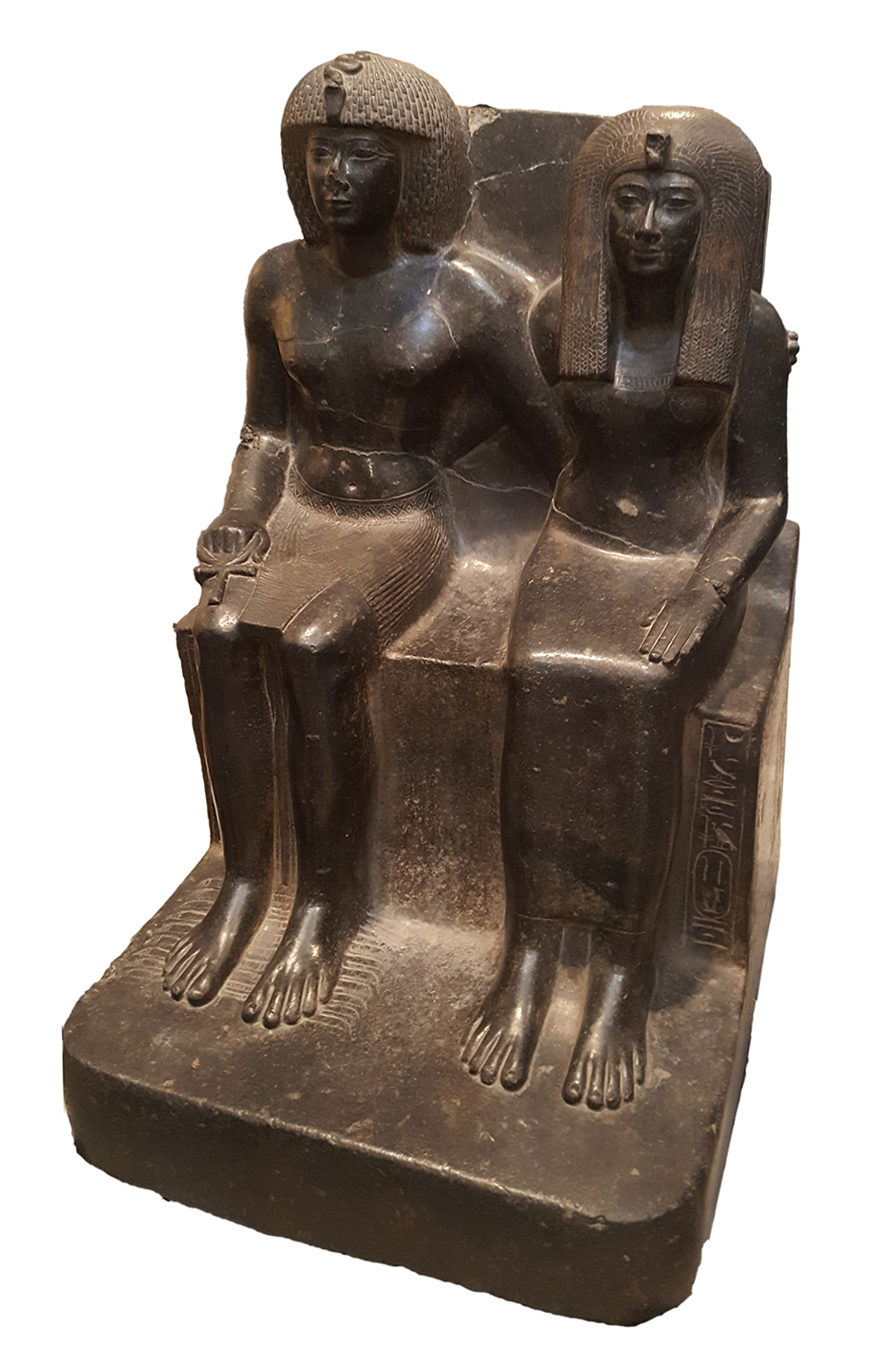
- Joint statue of Tiaa and her son Thutmose IV
- Burial: KV32, Valley of the Kings, Thebes
- Spouse: Amenhotep II
- Issue: Thutmose IV
- Dynasty: Eighteenth Dynasty of Egypt
- Religion: ancient Egyptian religion

ti O29V B7
Tiaa
in hieroglyphs
Era: New Kingdom
(1550–1069 BC)

Tiaa or Tia'a was an ancient Egyptian queen consort during the Eighteenth Dynasty of Egypt. She was a "faceless concubine" during the time of Amenhotep II who withheld from her the title Great Royal Wife, but when her son Thutmose IV became pharaoh, he performed a revision of her status and gave her that title.

== Life ==
She is never called "King's Daughter" and thus her parentage is unknown. It has been speculated that she was Amenhotep's sister or half-sister, but it is not certain. During the reign of her husband the women of the royal family were much less represented than earlier during the 18th dynasty; this was probably because the pharaoh did not want any of them to usurp power as Hatshepsut had only a few decades earlier. Tiaa is the only known wife of Amenhotep, and her name is known to us only because she was the mother of the next pharaoh, Thutmose IV. She received the title of Great Royal Wife during her son's reign; in her husband's lifetime it was borne only by Amenhotep's mother Merytre-Hatshepsut.

Tiaa is not depicted on any monuments built by her husband, only on those which were completed by her son. During the reign of Thutmose IV she rose to more prominence; along with the title of Great Royal Wife she also received the titles King's Mother and God's Wife. On many statues she and Thutmose's first chief wife Nefertari accompany the pharaoh. Several depictions of Merytre-Hatshepsut were altered to show Tiaa. One of Thutmose's daughters, Tiaa, is likely to have been named after her.

== Death and burial ==
Tiaa was buried in the tomb KV32 in the Valley of the Kings, where fragments of her funerary equipment – including a canopic chest – were found. Floodwater washed some of these into KV47, the adjacent 19th dynasty tomb of Pharaoh Siptah, causing Egyptologists to believe they belong to a like-named mother of Siptah, but since then Siptah's mother has been identified as a Syrian concubine named Sutailja.
