= Minmose (overseer of works) =

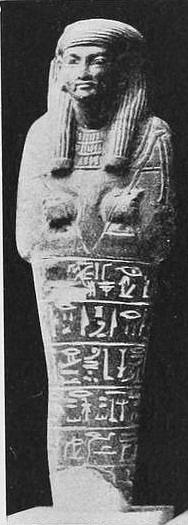
Ushabti of Minmose

Minmose was overseer of priests of Month, lord of Thebes and the overseer of works in all temples of Upper and Lower Egypt for the Egyptian pharaohs Thutmose III and Amenhotep II. He took part in expeditions to Syria, during Thutmose's eighth campaign, as well as Nubia and, as commander of the elite forces, in Takhsy—a territory located between Damascus and Canaan. The expedition into Takhsy was likely related to Amenhotep II's campaign.

== History ==
In addition to overseeing the construction of many temples, Minmose collected taxes in Retenu, and in Nubia during Thutmose's Nubian campaign in the 49th year of the pharaoh's reign. He lived in the 15th century BC.

He is known from several statues found all over Egypt.

== Bibliography ==
- Alan Gardiner, Egypt of the Pharaohs. pp. 197–199. Oxford University Press, 1964.
- Donald Bruce Redford, The Wars in Syria and Palestine of Thutmose III, Brill Academic Publishers 2003
