= TT24 =

Burial place of ancient Egyptian official Nebamun

Coordinates: 25.7333°N 32.6000°E

Theban tomb TT24
- Burial site of Nebamun
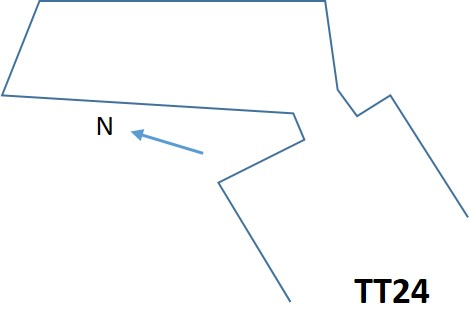

- Location within Egypt
- Location: Sheikh Abd el-Qurna, Theban Necropolis
- ← Previous; TT23 Next → TT25

i mn n nb
Nebamun
in hieroglyphs
Era: New Kingdom
(1550–1069 BC)

The Theban Tomb TT24 is located in Sheikh Abd el-Qurna. It forms part of the Theban Necropolis, situated on the west bank of the Nile opposite Luxor. The tomb is the burial place of the ancient Egyptian official, Nebamun.

Nebamun was the steward of the king's wife Nebtu, one of the wives of Thutmose III. Nebamun was the son of Tetires and Lady Ipu. His wife was named Resti.

== See also ==
- List of Theban tombs
- N. de Garis Davies, Nina and Norman de Garis Davies, Egyptologists
