= Nebtu =

Ancient Egyptian queen

nb t Z1 w
Nebtu
in hieroglyphs
Era: New Kingdom
(1550–1069 BC)

Nebtu was an ancient Egyptian, the wife of Thutmose III.

She is depicted on a pillar in Thutmose's tomb KV34 where the pharaoh leads a procession of his family members – his two Great Royal Wives Merytre-Hatshepsut and Satiah, his wife Nebtu and his daughter Nefertari. The names of Satiah and Nefertari (Note: For other Ancient Egyptians of this name see Nefertari (disambiguation)) are followed by maa kheru, showing that they were already dead when the tomb was made. Unlike the names of the other two wives, Nebtu's name is not enclosed in a cartouche.

She had an estate, the steward, Nebamun was buried in TT24.

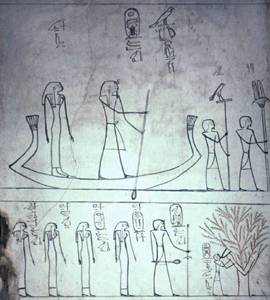
Thutmose III and his family; Thutmose's tomb
