= Ipu (nurse) =

Ipu was a royal nurse during the 18th Dynasty of ancient Egypt. She was the mother of Queen Satiah, Great Royal Wife of Pharaoh Thutmose III.

She is mentioned on an offering table of Satiah's, found in Abydos, now in the Egyptian Museum in Cairo. She is named Nurse of the God.

She may be identical with Ipu, the wife of Ahmose Pennekhbet.
