= Autobiography of Ahmose Pen-Nekhebet =

Ancient Egyptian soldier

The Autobiography of Ahmose Pen Nekhbet is a tomb inscription from ancient Egypt, which is significant to Egyptology studies. Ahmose Pen Nekhbet was an ancient Egyptian official who started his career under Ahmose I and served all the pharaohs until Thutmose III. His autobiographical inscriptions are important for the understanding of the history of the early New Kingdom, though less detailed than those of his contemporary Ahmose, son of Ebana. In his tomb, he mentions his brother Khaemwaset and his wife Ipu, (who some have suggested may be the same as the royal nurse Ipu, mother of Queen Satiah). His tomb is located in Nekhen where it is given the designation EK2.

Under Ahmose I, he fought in Northern Canaan; then he followed Amenhotep I to Nubia, accompanied Thutmose I to Naharin, and campaigned with Thutmose II in Sinai.

He held many offices such as wearer of the royal seal, chief treasurer and herald. His autobiography ends with the assertion that he had been the tutor of Neferure, daughter of Hatshepsut.

== Bibliography ==
- "Biography of Ahmose Pen-Nekhbet" in Ancient Records of Egypt by J. H. Breasted, Part Two, sections 17ff, 40ff. Full text on Archive
- Anneke Bart: The New Kingdom Tombs of El Kab / Nekhen
