= Siamun (disambiguation) =

i mn n zA A1
Siamun
in hieroglyphs

Siamun is an ancient Egyptian personal name for males, Manuel de Codage transliteration: s3-jmn, meaning "Son of Amun." Its female version is Sitamun.

- Netjerkheperre-setepenamun Siamun, Egyptian pharaoh of the 21st Dynasty
- Siamun (son of Ahmose I)
- Siamun (son of Thutmose III)
- A son of Ramesses II, No. 25 on the list of princes
