= Beketamun =

- King's Daughter
Egyptian name
i mn n G29 t B1
- Dynasty: Eighteenth Dynasty
- Father: Thutmose III

Beketamun or Beket was a princess of the Eighteenth Dynasty of Egypt, a daughter of Pharaoh Thutmose III. Her name means “Handmaid of Amun”.

Her name is inscribed on a faience votive object (together with her father's cartouche) found in Deir el-Bahri (now in Boston). She is also mentioned on a wooden staff of her servant, Amenmose, and probably on a scarab (now in the British Museum). It is possible that she is the princess standing behind Princess Meritamen in the Hathor chapel in Deir el-Bahri.
