= Hui (priestess) =

Egyptian priestess during the 18th Dynasty

Hui or Huy was an ancient Egyptian priestess during the Eighteenth Dynasty. She was the mother of Merytre-Hatshepsut, the Great Royal Wife of Pharaoh Thutmose III.

Hui played an important role in the cults of Amun, Ra and Atum. One of her statues was found, it names her as the possible mother of the Great Royal Wife. This might prove that Merytre was not the daughter of Queen Hatshepsut, as she was thought to be. The statue, which is now in the British Museum, also depicts the children of Thutmose and Merytre, except for Amenhotep II. Princess Nebetiunet is sitting on her grandmother's lap, Prince Menkheperre and princesses Meritamen, the other Meritamen and Iset can be seen on the side of the statue. Iset was probably the youngest, as her figure is much smaller than that of the others.
