= TT25 =

Tomb of the ancient Egyptian official, Amenemhab

Coordinates: 25.7333°N 32.6000°E

Theban tomb TT25
- Burial site of Amenemhab
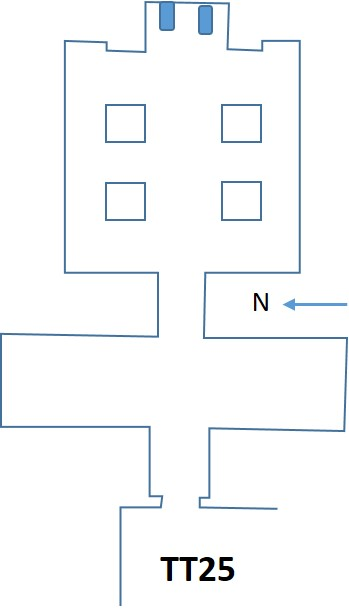

- Location within Egypt
- Location: El-Assasif, Theban Necropolis
- ← Previous; TT24 Next → TT26

i mn n M W3
Amenemheb
in hieroglyphs
Era: New Kingdom
(1550–1069 BC)

The Theban Tomb TT25 is located in El-Assasif. It forms part of the Theban Necropolis, situated on the west bank of the Nile opposite Luxor. The tomb is the burial place of the ancient Egyptian official, Amenemhab.

Amenemhab was a high priest of Khonsu from the Ramesside period. His wife Tausert was chief of the harem of Khonsu.

== See also ==
- List of Theban tombs
