= Satiah =

Queen consort of ancient Egypt

- Queen consort of Egypt; Great Royal Wife; God's Wife of Amun
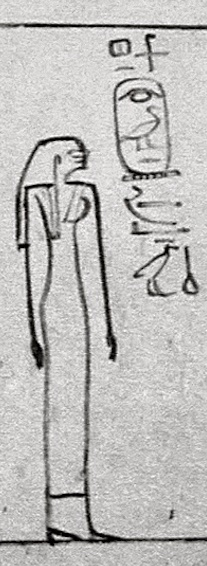
- Queen Satiah
- Died: Thebes?
- Burial: Thebes?
- Spouse: Thutmose III
- Issue: Amenemhat (disputed)
- Dynasty: 18th Dynasty
- Mother: Ipu, a royal nurse
- Religion: Ancient Egyptian religion

Satiah (also, Sitiah, Sitioh; "Daughter of the Moon") was an ancient Egyptian queen, the first Great Royal Wife of Pharaoh Thutmose III.

== Family ==
< N12 G39 t >
Satiah
in hieroglyphs
Era: New Kingdom
(1550–1069 BC)

Satiah was the daughter of the royal nurse Ipu. It is possible that her father was the important official Ahmose Pen-Nekhebet. She was likely the mother of Prince Amenemhat – Thutmose's eldest son (sometimes considered son of Neferure), who died during his father's reign.

Satiah died during her husband's reign, shortly after Hatshepsut's death, and Thutmose's next Great Royal Wife was Merytre.

== Biography ==
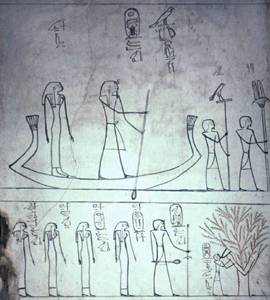
Thutmose III and his family from his tomb KV34. Queen Satiah is the second woman behind pharaoh Thutmose III in the lower register.

Satiah's titles include: King's Wife (ḥmt-nisw), Great King's Wife (ḥmt-niswt-wrt) and God's Wife (ḥmt-ntr).

Satiah is attested in several places. In Abydos the text on an offering table mentions her mother, the “nurse of the god” Ipu. The offering table was dedicated by the lector priest Therikiti. A bronze votive axe-head(?) (now in the Cairo Museum), inscribed with the name of Queen Satiah, was also found in Abydos.

At the temple of Montu at El-Tod, a statue of the queen was dedicated by Thutmose III after her death (the statue is now in the Cairo Museum).

Queen Satiah is depicted behind Queen Merytre-Hatshepsut and Thutmose III on a pillar in the tomb of the king (KV34). Behind Queen Satiah, we see the King's Wife Nebtu and the King's Daughter Nefertari.

Satiah is depicted before Thutmose III in a relief from Karnak. A stela in the Cairo Museum shows Queen Satiah standing behind Thutmose III.
