= Merytre-Hatshepsut =

Second Great Royal Spouse of Pharaoh Thutmose III

< ra mr i i t F4 t A51 >
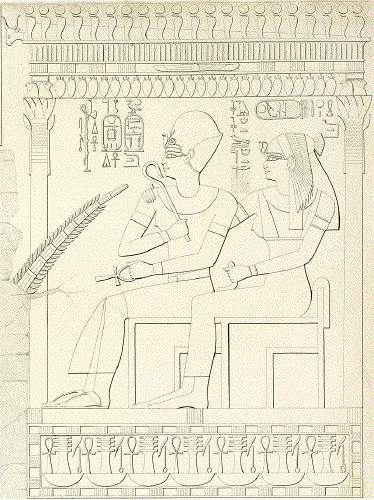
- Merytre-Hatshepsut (right) and her son Amenhotep II (left)

Queen consort of Egypt
- Tenure: c. 1425 BC
- Pharaoh: Thutmose III
- Died: c. 1425 BC
- Spouse: Thutmose III
- Issue: Amenhotep II; Menkheperre; Nebetiunet; Meritamen C Meritamen D Iset
- Dynasty: 18th Dynasty of Egypt

Merytre-Hatshepsut, or Hatshepsut-Meryet-Ra (died c. 1425 BC) was the Great Royal Wife of Pharaoh Thutmose III following the death of Queen Satiah. She was the mother of Pharaoh Amenhotep II.

== Family ==
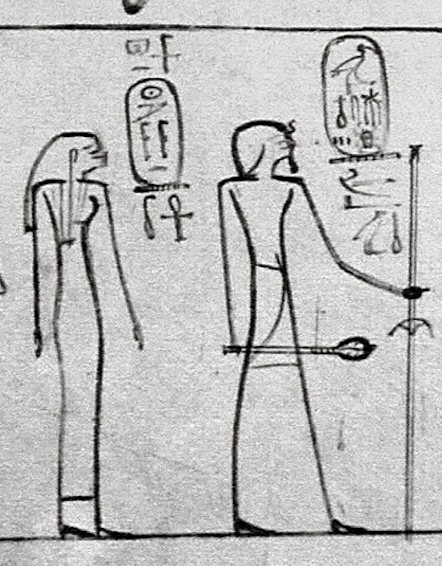
Merytre-Hatshepsut behind Thutmose III from tomb KV34

Merytre-Hatshepsut was of noble birth, possibly the daughter of the Adoratrix Hui. A statue of Hui in the British Museum (EA 1280) depicts her holding a grandchild and includes representations of the other children of Thutmose III and Merytre-Hatshepsut along the sides of her seated figure. Merytre-Hatshepsut was the mother of Pharaoh Amenhotep II, as well as the prince Menkheperre and the princesses Nebetiunet, Meritamen C, Meritamen D, and Iset.

== Biography ==
Merytre-Hatshepsut is known to have held the titles Hereditary Princess (iryt-p`t), Sole One, Great of Praises (wrt-hzwt-w’tit), King's Mother (mwt-niswt), Lady of The Two Lands (nbt-t3wy), King's Wife (hmt-nisw), Great King's Wife (hmt-niswt-wrt), God's Wife (hmt-ntr), and God's Hand (djrt-ntr).

Merytre-Hatshepsut became a Great Royal Wife after the death of Queen Satiah. She is attested in the mortuary temple of Thutmose III in Medinet Habu. The queen is depicted standing behind a seated Thutmose III, wearing full queenly regalia, including the vulture cap and a modius with double plumes, while holding a fly-whisk. She is titled Great Royal Wife.

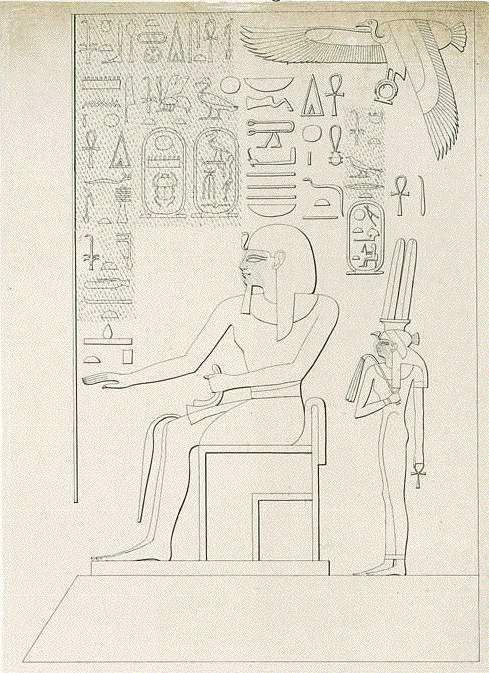
Merytre-Hatshepsut depicted in the mortuary temple of Thutmose III in Medinet Habu

Merytre-Hatshepsut is depicted in several tombs, including that of her husband Thutmose III (KV34). On one of the pillars in his tomb, Merytre is shown as one of three queens following Thutmose III. She is followed by Queen Satiah, Queen Nebtu, and Princess Nefertari.

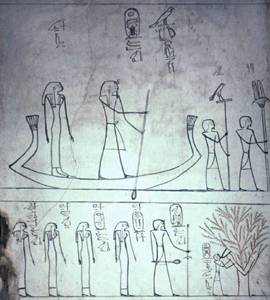
Thutmose III and his family from his tomb KV34. In the bottom register, Merytre stands right behind Thutmose III.

In the tomb of Ra (TT72) in Thebes, Merytre-Hatshepsut is depicted seated next to or behind her son, Amenhotep II. Another scene in a tomb at Sheikh Abd el-Qurna appears to depict a statue of Merytre-Hatshepsut on a sled within a small structure. Other statues depicted alongside her represent Thutmose III. A stela borne by a courtier’s statue shows Merytre-Hatshepsut standing before Thutmose III. In this scene, she is wearing a modius with double plumes, holding a fly-whisk in one hand and an ankh in the other.

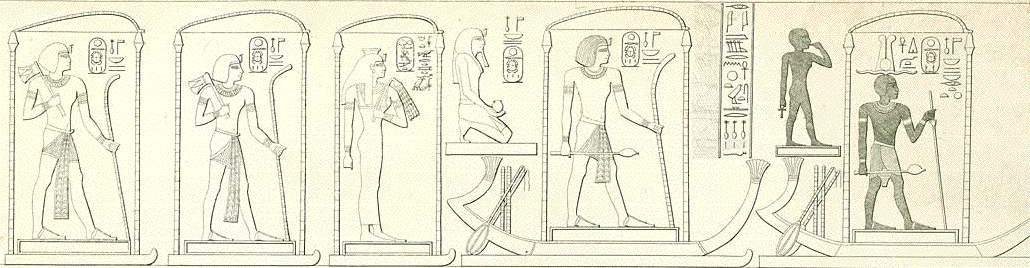
Scene from a tomb in Sheikh Abd el-Qurna. The scene appears to depict a statue of Merytre-Hatshepsut.

== Death and burial ==
Merytre-Hatshepsut was originally intended to be interred in KV42. Foundation deposits found in 1921 clearly establish that the tomb was initially meant for her. However, she may have been buried in KV35, the tomb of her son, Amenhotep II. KV42 may have later been reused for the Theban Mayor Sennefer and his wife, Senetnay. The fact that KV42 was not used for her burial may suggest her disgrace during the reign of her grandson.
