= Amenemhat (son of Thutmose III) =

Egyptian prince

See Amenemhat (disambiguation) for other individuals with this name.

M17 Y5 N35 G17 F4 t
Amenemhat
in hieroglyphs
Era: New Kingdom
(1550–1069 BC)

Amenemhat was a prince of the Eighteenth Dynasty of Egypt. He was the son of Pharaoh Thutmose III.

Amenemhat was the eldest son and appointed heir of the pharaoh. It is possible that his mother was Queen Satiah, but it has also been proposed that Neferure – the daughter of Hatshepsut and Thutmose II – was married to Thutmose III. Although Neferure is identified several times as the royal wife of Thutmose III while he was the co-regent of Hatshepsut, who was serving as pharaoh, some authors think it is less likely that Neferure was the mother of Amenemhat.

The name of Amenemhat was mentioned on an inscription in the Karnak Temple in the 24th year, shortly after the death of Hatshepsut and the subsequent ascension of his father to pharaoh. He was appointed as Overseer of cattle – quite an unusual title for a prince – in that year.

Amenemhat predeceased his father, who ruled for more than thirty years after Hatshepsut died, so the next pharaoh was his half-brother Amenhotep II.

== Sources ==
- 6 Satiah, 1ª Gran Esposa Real; Meritre, 2ª Gran Esposa Real; Isis, la madre del Rey - Las mujeres en la vida de Tutmosis III - Los Nobles de Egipto (by Alexandre Herrero Pardo)
