= Nefertari (disambiguation) =

Nefertari was a queen of Egypt and the wife of Ramesses II.

Nefertari may also refer to:

== Ancient Egypt ==
- Nefertari (18th dynasty), a wife of Thutmose IV
- Nefertari, a daughter of Thutmose III
- Nefertari, daughter of vizier Ptahmose
- Nefertari, a child of Ramesses II
- Nefertari, wife of Prince Amun-her-khepeshef; possibly identical with the daughter of Ramesses II (19th dynasty)

== Other ==
- Néfertari Bélizaire (1962–2017), Haitian-Canadian actor
- Nefertari Vivi, a character in the manga One Piece

== See also ==
- Ahmose-Nefertari, a Queen of Egypt and a daughter of Seqenenre Tao II and Ahhotep I
- Neferteri Shepherd (born 1980), African-American model and actress
