= Iset (daughter of Thutmose III) =

- King's Daughter
Egyptian name
st t H8 B1
- Dynasty: 18th Dynasty
- Father: Thutmose III
- Mother: Merytre-Hatshepsut

Iset or Isis was a princess of the Eighteenth Dynasty of Egypt, a daughter of Pharaoh Thutmose III and his Great Royal Wife Merytre-Hatshepsut.

She is one of six known children of Thutmose and Merytre; her siblings are Pharaoh Amenhotep II, Prince Menkheperre and princesses Nebetiunet, Meritamen and the second Meritamen. She is depicted together with her sisters and Menkheperre on a statue of their maternal grandmother Hui (now in the British Museum); she is depicted as smaller than her siblings, so she is likely to have been the youngest of them.
