= TT26 =

Theban tomb

Coordinates: 25.7333°N 32.6000°E

Theban tomb TT26
- Burial site of Khnumemhab
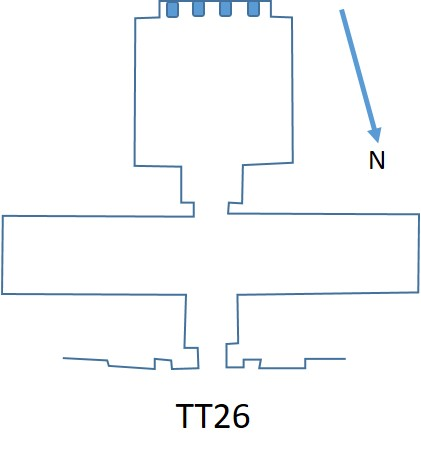

- Location within Egypt
- Location: El-Assasif, Theban Necropolis
- ← Previous; TT25 Next → TT27

W9 m H W3 N5 b
Khnumemheb
in hieroglyphs
Era: New Kingdom
(1550–1069 BC)

The Theban Tomb TT26 is located in El-Assasif, part of the Theban Necropolis, on the west bank of the Nile, opposite to Luxor. It is the burial place of the ancient Egyptian official, Khnumemhab.

Khnumemhab was an overseer of the treasury in the Ramesseum in the estate of Amun during the reign of Ramesses II. His wife Meryesi (or Mery-Isis) is shown in the hall and inner room of the tomb.

== See also ==
- List of Theban tombs
