= Nebetiunet =

- King's Daughter
Egyptian name
nb t O28 t O49
- Dynasty: 18th Dynasty
- Father: Thutmose III
- Mother: Merytre-Hatshepsut

Nebetiunet (“Lady of Dendera”; a title of the goddess Hathor) was a princess of the Eighteenth Dynasty of Egypt, a daughter of Pharaoh Thutmose III and his Great Royal Wife Merytre-Hatshepsut.

She is one of six known children of Thutmose and Merytre; her siblings are Pharaoh Amenhotep II, Prince Menkheperre and princesses Meritamen, the second Meritamen and Iset. She is depicted together with her sisters and Menkheperre on a statue of their maternal grandmother Hui (now in the British Museum).
