= TT28 =

Theban tomb

Coordinates: 25.7333°N 32.6000°E

Theban tomb TT28
- Burial site of Hori
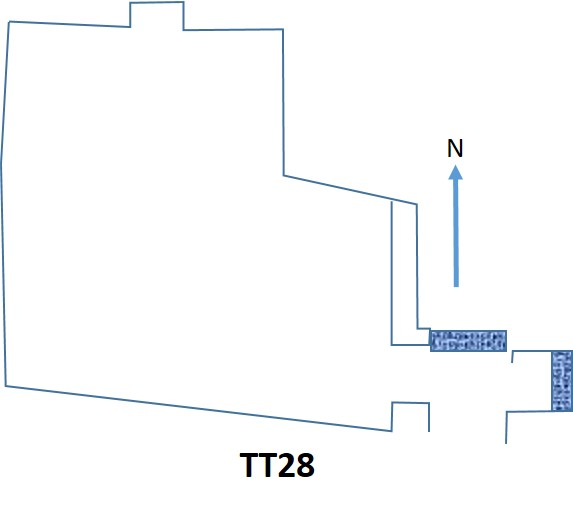

- Location within Egypt
- Location: El-Assasif, Theban Necropolis
- ← Previous; TT27 Next → TT29

G5 i
Hori
in hieroglyphs
Era: New Kingdom
(1550–1069 BC)

The Theban Tomb TT28 is located in El-Assasif. It forms part of the Theban Necropolis, situated on the west bank of the Nile opposite Luxor. The tomb is the burial place of the ancient Egyptian official, Hori.

Hori was an officer of the estate of Amun during the Ramesside Period.

In November 2018, an Egyptian archaeological excavation team uncovered the original entrance of the tomb; in addition to another tomb, that of Thaw-Rakht-If. Two huge wooden anthropoid sarcophagi were found, identified as Padiset and Nesmutamu; they are attributed to another occupant of the tomb of a later period and not Hori. The mission uncovered two wooden statues of the deceased, five painted wooden funerary masks, and a collection of ushabti figurines made of faience, wood, burnt clay, along with a papyrus containing Chapter 125 of the Book of the Dead. A cache of mummies were also found in the tomb. The tomb wall was decorated and included scenes of the owner's wife, Kharousekhmet-Nefret, singer of Amun-Re.

== See also ==
- List of Theban tombs
