= TT27 =

Theban tomb

Coordinates: 25.7333°N 32.6000°E

Theban tomb TT27
- Burial site of Sheshonk
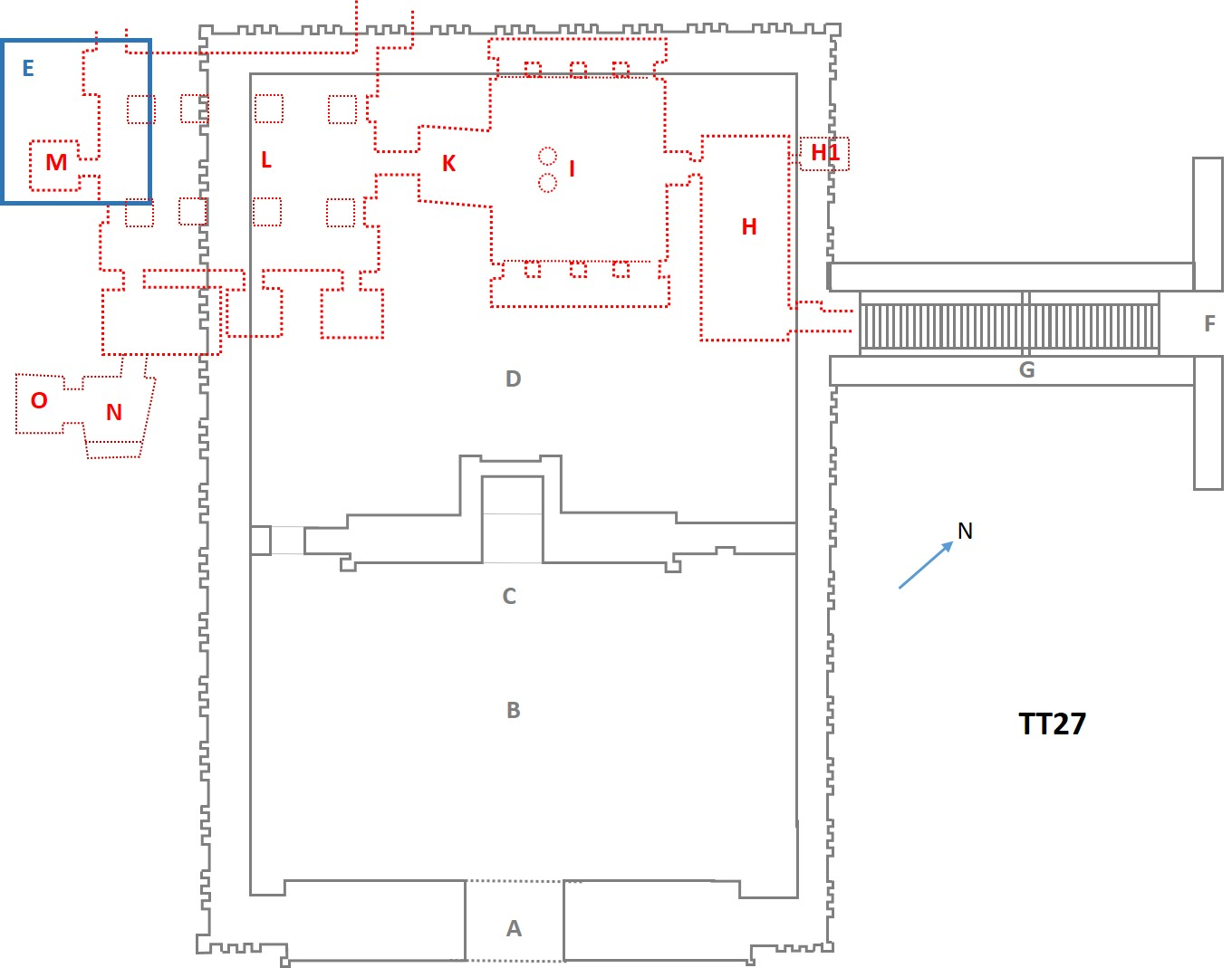

- Location within Egypt
- Location: El-Assasif, Theban Necropolis
- ← Previous; TT26 Next → TT28

M8 M8 n q
Sheshonk
in hieroglyphs
Era: Late Period
(664–332 BC)

The Theban Tomb TT27 is located in El-Assasif. It forms part of the Theban Necropolis, situated on the west bank of the Nile opposite Luxor. The tomb is the burial place of the ancient Egyptian official, Sheshonk.

Sheshonk was the chief steward of the God's Wife of Amun Ankhnesneferibre, dating to the reign of king Apries and king Amasis II. Sheshonk was the son of Harsiesi and his wife Tahibet. Harsiesi was a chief steward of the God's Wife as well.

== See also ==
- List of Theban tombs
