= Menkheperre (prince) =

ra mn xpr
Menkheperre
in hieroglyphs
Era: New Kingdom
(1550–1069 BC)

Menkheperre was a prince of the Eighteenth Dynasty of Egypt, one of two known sons of Pharaoh Thutmose III and his Great Royal Wife Merytre-Hatshepsut. His name is the throne name of his father and means “Eternal are the manifestations of Re”.

He is one of six known children of Thutmose and Merytre; his siblings are Pharaoh Amenhotep II, and princesses Nebetiunet, Meritamen, the second Meritamen and Iset. He is depicted together with his sisters on a statue of their maternal grandmother Hui (now in the British Museum). It is likely that some canopic jar fragments from the Valley of the Queens are his.
