= Siamun (son of Thutmose III) =

Ancient Egyptian prince

i mn n G39
Siamun
in hieroglyphs
Era: New Kingdom
(1550–1069 BC)

Siamun (“Son of Amun”) was a prince of the Eighteenth Dynasty of Egypt, a son of Pharaoh Thutmose III.

He is named on a statue of Chancellor Sennefer (now in the Egyptian Museum in Cairo), which can be dated to the reign of Thutmose III. He was the half-brother of Pharaoh Amenhotep II
