= Meritamen C and D (daughters of Thutmose III) =

i mn n mr i i t B1
Meritamen
in hieroglyphs
Era: New Kingdom
(1550–1069 BC)

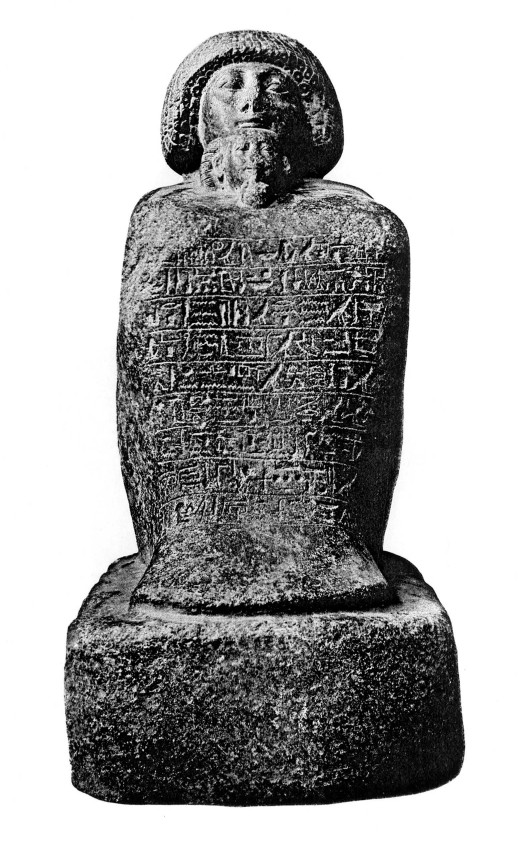
One of Thutmose III's daughters named Meritamen with Benermerut. It is unclear if this depiction is of Meritamen C or Meritamen D.

Meritamen (“Beloved of Amun”) was the name of two princesses during the Eighteenth Dynasty of Egypt, referred to as Meritamen C and Meritamen D by modern historians. Both were the daughters of Pharaoh Thutmose III and his Great Royal Wife Merytre-Hatshepsut. Their name is alternatively spelled Meritamun.

== Biography ==
Meritamen C and Meritamen D were two of six known children of Thutmose and Merytre. Their siblings were Pharaoh Amenhotep II, Prince Menkheperre and princesses Nebetiunet and Iset. They are depicted, together with their sisters and Menkheperre, on a statue of their maternal grandmother Hui (now in the British Museum). Meritamen C is also depicted in the Hathor chapel built by her father in Deir el-Bahri.

Meritamen C inherited the title God's Wife of Amun from her mother. Her additional titles were King's Daughter and King's Sister.

It is not known which of the princesses named Meritamen is shown on the lap of Benermerut, the Overseer of the Works, on his cubic statue found in Karnak.
