= Thutmose III =

Pharaoh of Egypt from 1479 to 1425 BC

- Tuthmosis III, "Manahpi(r)ya" in the Amarna letters
- Thutmose III statue in Luxor Museum

Pharaoh
- Reign: 54 regnal years: 28 April 1479 – 11 March 1425 BC (Low Chronology)
- Coregency: Hatshepsut (until his 22nd year)
- Predecessor: Thutmose II
- Successor: Amenhotep II
Royal titulary
Horus name
Kanakht Khaemwaset
Mighty Bull, Arising in Thebes
G5	E1 D40 N28 m S40 t O49
Nebty name
Wahnesytmireempet
Enduring in kingship like Re in heaven
G16	V29 sw t i i ra Z1 mi m Q3 X1 N1
Golden Horus
Sekhempahtydjeserkhaw
Powerful of strength, holy of diadems
G8	sxm F9 F9 D45 N28 Z3
Prenomen
Menkheperre
Lasting is the Manifestation of Re

M23 X1 L2 X1	ra mn xpr
Nomen
Djehutymes Neferkheperu
Thoth is born, beautiful of forms

G39 N5	G26 ms nfr xpr
- Consorts: Satiah, Hatshepsut-Meryetre, Nebtu, Menwi, Merti, Menhet, Nebsemi
- Children: Amenemhat, Amenhotep II, Beketamun, Iset, Menkheperre, Meritamen C and Meritamen D, Nebetiunet, Nefertiri, Siamun
- Father: Thutmose II
- Mother: Iset
- Died: 11 March 1425 BC
- Burial: KV34; Mummy found in the Deir el-Bahri royal cache (Theban Necropolis)
- Monuments: Mortuary temple of Thutmose III; Cleopatra's Needle; Obelisk of Theodosius
- Dynasty: 18th Dynasty

Thutmose III (also written as Thutmosis, Tuthmosis, or Thothmes in older history works in Latinized Greek; Ancient Egyptian: 𓅝𓄟𓄤𓆣 or ḏḥwti.ms(.w): "Born of Thoth": c. 1485 BC – 11 March 1425 BC), sometimes called Thutmose the Great, was the fifth pharaoh of the 18th Dynasty of Egypt. He is regarded as one of the greatest warriors, military commanders, and military strategists of his time; as Egypt's preeminent warrior pharaoh and conqueror; and as a dominant figure in the New Kingdom period.

Technically, Thutmose III ruled Egypt from 28 April 1479 BC until his death on 11 March 1425 BC. However, for the first 22 years of his reign he was coregent with his stepmother and aunt, Hatshepsut, who was named pharaoh. He became sole ruler after Hatshepsut's death around 1458 BC.

Thutmose III conducted between 17 and 20 military campaigns, all victorious, which brought ancient Egypt's empire to its zenith. They are detailed in the inscriptions known as the Annals of Thutmose III. He also created the ancient Egyptian navy, the first navy in the ancient world. Historian Richard Gabriel called him the "Napoleon of Egypt".

Two years before his own death, and after the death of his firstborn son and heir Amenemhat, Thutmose III appointed a later son, Amenhotep II, as junior co-regent and successor-in-waiting.

== Names ==
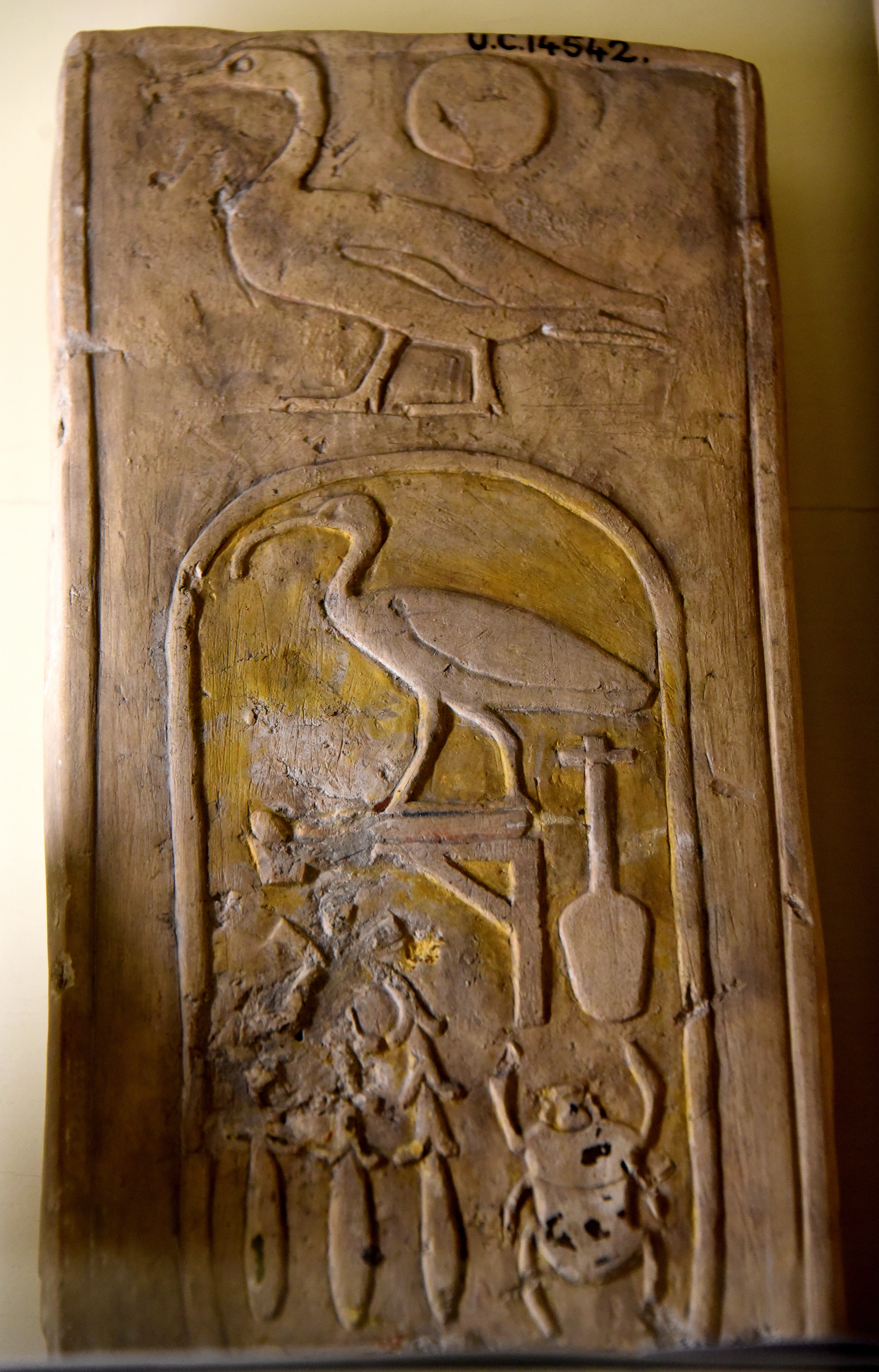
A wall block fragment inscribed with the birth name of Thutmose III, now in the Petrie Museum, London

Thutmose's two main names transliterate as mn-ḫpr-rꜥ ḏḥwtj-ms. The first name is usually transcribed as Menkheperre and means "the Established One of the Manifestation of Ra". The second name is transliterated as Thutmose or Tuthmosis and means "Born of Thoth" or "Thoth is born". Manetho in his Aegyptiaca (History of Egypt) written in Greek and paraphrased by Eusebius called him Miphrês (Μίφρης) and Misphragmuthôsis (Μισφραγμούθωσις).

== Family ==
Thutmose III was the son of Thutmose II by his secondary wife, Iset. His father's Great Royal Wife was Hatshepsut. Her daughter, Neferure, was Thutmose's half-sister.

When his father died, Thutmose III was too young to rule; estimates of his age vary between two and 13 years. Hatshepsut became his regent and ultimately declared herself pharaoh, while never denying kingship to Thutmose III. As a result, Thutmose III was relegated to junior coregent (Horus), while Hatshepsut became senior coregent (Osiris). During his childhood, Hatshepsut ruled Egypt in practice and name, achieving prosperity and success. While Thutmose III is depicted as the first on surviving monuments, both were assigned the usual royal names and insignia.

When Thutmose III reached a suitable age and demonstrated his capacity, Hatshepsut appointed him to head her armies, and upon her death around 1458 BC, he was ready to rule.

Some Egyptologists speculate that Thutmose III married his half-sister, Neferure, but there is no conclusive evidence. Neferure may have been the mother of Thutmose's firstborn son, Amenemhat, or alternatively his mother might have been the Great Royal Wife Satiah. Amenemhat predeceased his father.

Surviving records attest to several other wives of Thutmose III. He is known to have at least three foreign wives, Menhet, Menwi, and Merti, who were buried together. At least one other wife, Nebtu, is known from a pillar in Thutmose's tomb. Following the death of Satiah, Merytre-Hatshepsut became the Great Royal Wife.

=== Children with Merytre-Hatshepsut ===
- Amenhotep II (c. 1443 - c. 1400 BC)
- Iset
- Menkheperre
- Nebetiunet
- Meritamen C
- Meritamen D

=== Children with unknown spouse(s) ===
- Amenemhat
- Beketamun
- Siamun
- Nefertiri

== Dates and length of reign ==
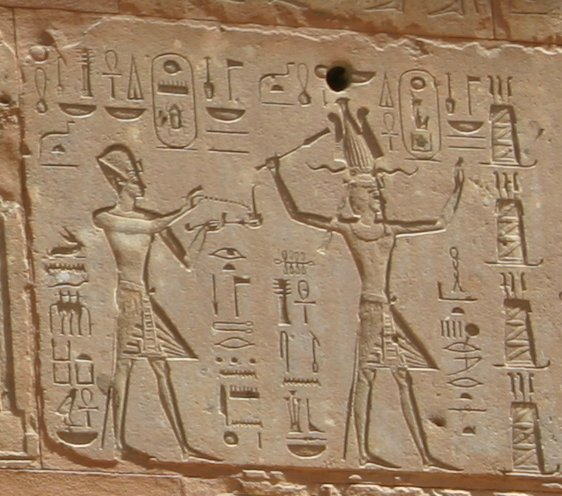
Relief from the Red Chapel showing Thutmose III following Hatshepsut

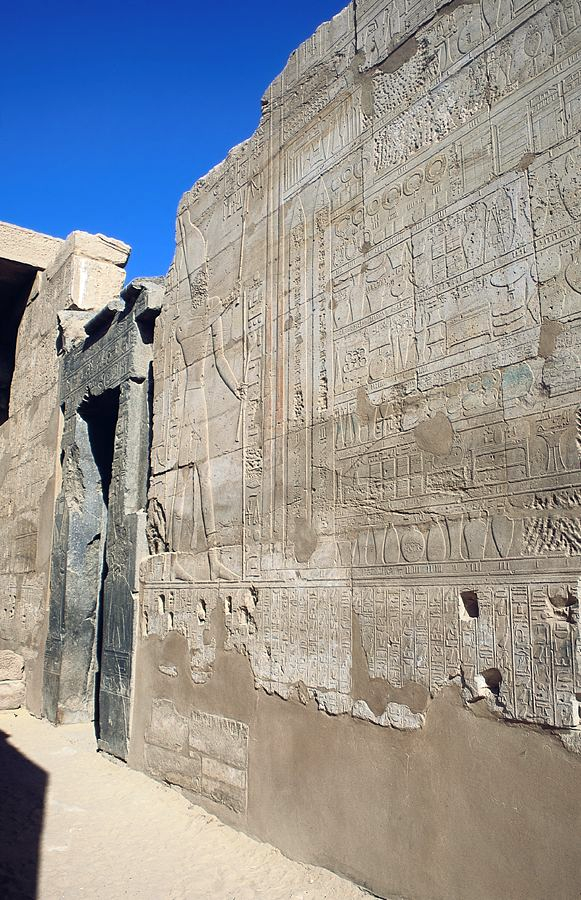
Annals of Thutmose III at Karnak depicting him standing before the offerings made to him after his foreign campaigns

Thutmose III reigned from 1479 BC to 1425 BC according to the Low Chronology of Ancient Egypt. This has been the conventional Egyptian chronology in academic circles since the 1960s, though in some circles the older dates 1504 BC to 1450 BC are preferred from the High Chronology of Egypt. These dates, just as all the dates of the 18th Dynasty, are open to dispute because of uncertainty about the circumstances surrounding the recording of a Heliacal Rise of Sothis in the reign of Amenhotep I.

=== Year 54 ===
The length of Thutmose III's reign is known to the day thanks to findings in the tomb of the military commander Amenemheb-Mahu, who records Thutmose III's death to his master's 54th regnal year, on the 3rd month of Peret (i.e. 7th month), day 30. The day of Thutmose III's accession is known to be Year 1, 1st month of Shemu (9th month), day 4, and astronomical observations can be used to establish the exact dates of the beginning and end of the king's reign (assuming the low chronology). Jürgen von Beckerath dates his coronation to 28 April 1479 BC, claiming that it is a "chronological certainty", and then calculates 11 March 1425 BC as the date of his death.

== Military campaigns ==
Thutmose III conducted at least 16 campaigns in 20 years. American Egyptologist James Breasted referred to him as "the Napoleon of Egypt" for his conquests and expansionism. He is recorded to have captured 350 cities during his rule and conquered much of the Near East from the Euphrates River to Nubia. He was the first pharaoh after Thutmose I to cross the Euphrates River, doing so during his campaign against Mitanni. His campaign records were inscribed onto the walls of the temple of Amun at Karnak (transcribed in Urkunden IV). He transformed Egypt into a hegemonic power, stretching from the Asian regions of Syria in the North, to Upper Nubia in the south.

Much is known about Thutmose III as a warrior and ruler, through the writings of his royal scribe and army commander Thanuny. The pharaoh was able to conquer so many lands because of revolutionary developments in military technology. The Hyksos may have brought advanced weaponry, such as horse-drawn chariots, around 1650 BC, which the Egyptians adopted in the process of driving them out. Thutmose III encountered little resistance from neighbouring kingdoms, allowing him to expand his realm easily. His army also portaged boats over dry land.

=== Campaign 1: Battle of Megiddo ===
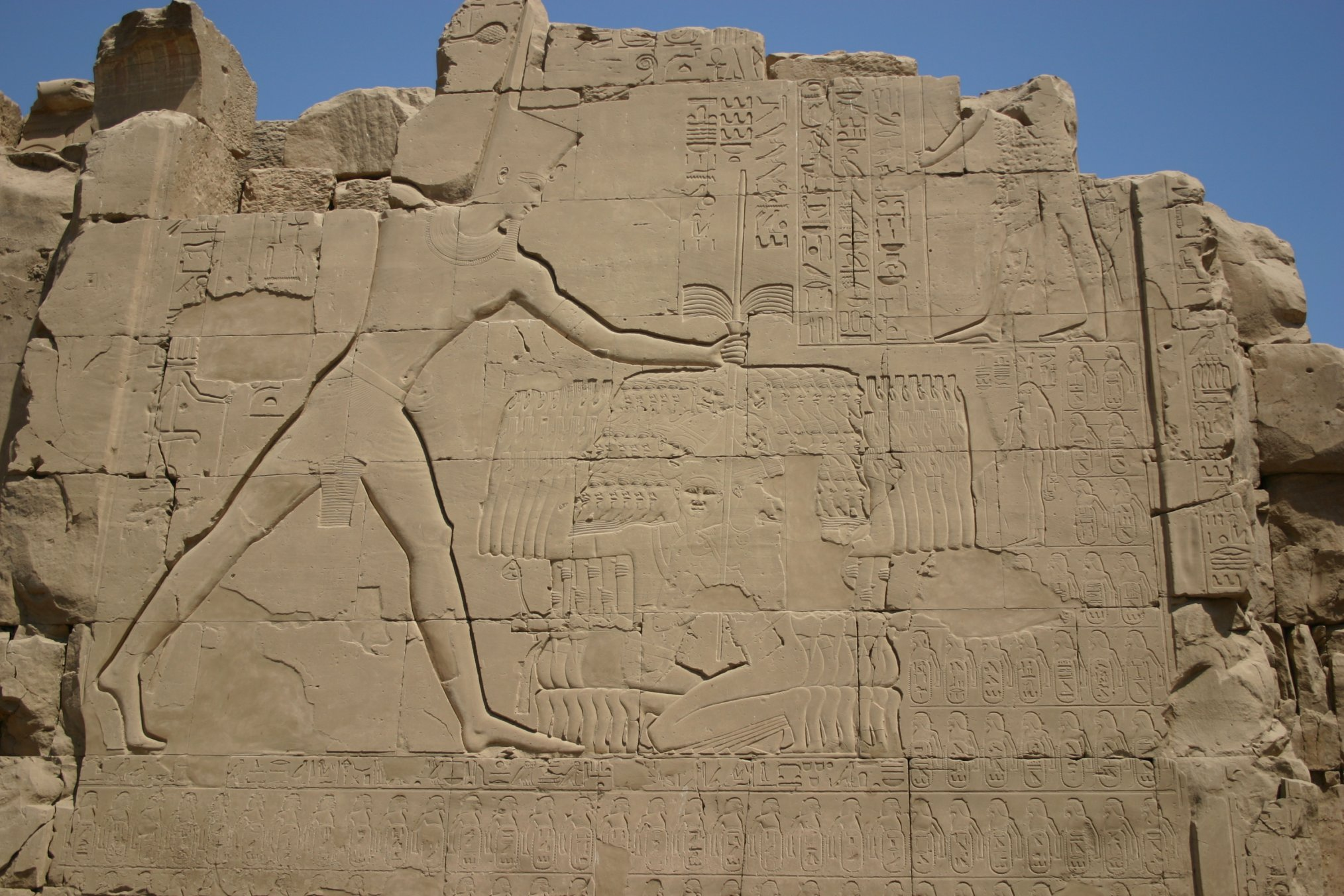
Thutmose III smiting his enemies. Relief on the seventh pylon in Karnak

When Hatshepsut died on the 10th day of the sixth month of Thutmose III's 21st year, according to a stela from Armant, the king of Kadesh advanced his army to Megiddo. Thutmose III mustered his own army and marched from Egypt, passing through the border fortress of Tjaru (Sile) on the 25th day of the eighth month. The army moved through the coastal plain as far as Jamnia, then turned inland, reaching Yehem, a small city near Megiddo, in the middle of the ninth month of the same year.

The ensuing Battle of Megiddo was likely the largest battle of Thutmose's 17 campaigns. A ridge of mountains jutting inland from Mount Carmel stood between Thutmose and Megiddo and he had three attack routes to choose from. The northern and southern routes around the mountain were judged by his generals to be safest, but Thutmose (as he boasted in an inscription) called them cowards and took the dangerous route through the Aruna mountain pass, which he said was only wide enough for single-file "horse after horse and man after man." Such a pass does exist, although it is not as narrow as Thutmose claims. The army emerged on the plain of Esdraelon, brilliantly cutting between the rear of the Canaanite forces and Megiddo city. According to Thutmose III's Hall of Annals in the Temple of Amun at Karnak, the battle occurred on "Year 23, I Shemu [day] 21, the exact day of the feast of the new moon", a lunar date. This date corresponds to 9 May 1457 BC, based on Thutmose III's accession in 1479 BC. In the battle, Thutmose routed the Canaanite forces, but allowed many to escape into Megiddo while his troops stopped to plunder. Thutmose was forced to besiege the city, and finally took it after a siege of seven or eight months.

The size of the two forces is difficult to determine. Redford uses the time to march the army through the pass estimate the Egyptian numbers, and the number of sheep and goats captured in the battle to estimate the Canaanite force, concluding both armies were around 10,000 men. The Egyptian army was most likely larger than the Canaanite army.

This campaign drastically changed the political situation in the ancient Near East. By taking Megiddo, Thutmose gained control of all of northern Canaan, forcing the Syrian princes to send tribute and noble hostages to Egypt. Beyond the Euphrates, the Assyrian, Babylonian and Hittite kings honored Thutmose with gifts, which he claimed as "tribute" on the walls of Karnak. The only notable absence was Mitanni, which would bear the brunt of subsequent Egyptian campaigns into Western Asia.

=== Campaigns 2–4: Tours of Canaan and Syria ===
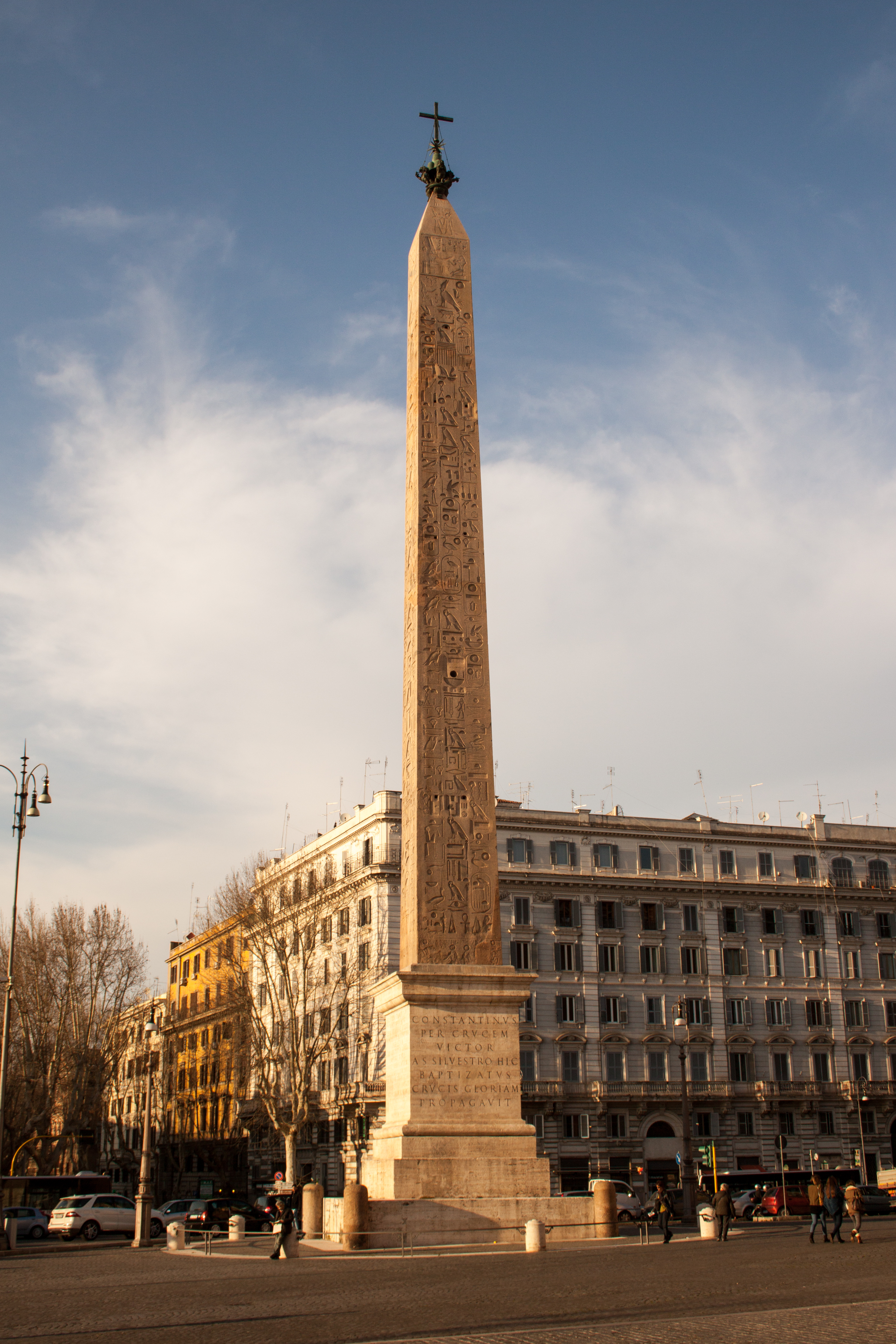
Thutmose's tekhen waty, today standing in Rome as the Lateran obelisk. The move from Egypt to Rome was initiated by Constantine the Great (Roman Emperor, 324–337) in 326, though he died before it could be shipped out of Alexandria. His son, the Emperor Constantius II completed the transfer in 357. An account of the shipment was written by contemporary historian Ammianus Marcellinus.

Thutmose III's second, third, and fourth campaigns appear to have been nothing more than tours of Syria and Canaan to collect tribute. Traditionally, the material directly after the text of the first campaign has been considered to be the second campaign. This text records tribute from the area which the Egyptians called Retjenu (roughly equivalent to Canaan) and it was also at this time that Assyria paid a second "tribute" to Thutmose III. It is probable that these texts come from Thutmose III's 40th year or later and thus have nothing to do with the second campaign at all. If so, no records of this campaign have been found. Thutmose III's third campaign was not considered significant enough to appear in his otherwise extensive Annals at Karnak. A survey was made of the animals and plants he found in Canaan, which was illustrated on the walls of a special room at Karnak. This survey is dated to Thutmose III's 25th year. No record remains of Thutmose III's fourth campaign, but at some point a fort was built in lower Lebanon and timber was cut for construction of a processional barque, and this probably fits best during this time frame.

=== Campaigns 5–7: Conquest of Syria ===
The fifth, sixth and seventh campaigns of Thutmose III were directed against the Phoenician cities in Syria and against Kadesh on the Orontes. In Thutmose III's 29th year, he began his fifth campaign, where he first took an unknown city (the name falls in a lacuna) which had been garrisoned by Tunip. He then moved inland and took the city and territory around Ardata; the town was pillaged and its wheatfields burned. Unlike previous plundering raids, Thutmose III garrisoned Djahy, a name which probably refers to southern Syria. This would have permitted him to ship supplies and troops between Syria and Egypt, and some have supposed that Thutmose III's sixth campaign, in his thirtieth year, commenced with naval transport of troops directly to Byblos, bypassing Canaan. After the troops arrived in Syria, they proceeded into the Jordan River valley and moved north, pillaging Kadesh's lands. Turning west again, Thutmose III took Simyra and quelled a rebellion in Ardata, which apparently had rebelled again. To stop such rebellions, Thutmose III began taking hostages from the cities in Syria. The policy of these cities was driven by their nobles, aligned to Mitanni and typically consisting of a king and a small number of foreign Maryannu. Thutmose III found that taking hostages from these noble families largely ensured their loyalty. Syria rebelled again in Thutmose III's 31st year and he returned for his seventh campaign, taking the port city of Ullaza and the smaller Phoenician ports, and imposing more measures to prevent rebellion. By taking away the grain stores of Syria to his recently conquered harbors for support of his occupying troops and administrators, he left the famished cities of Syria without the means to fund further rebellions.

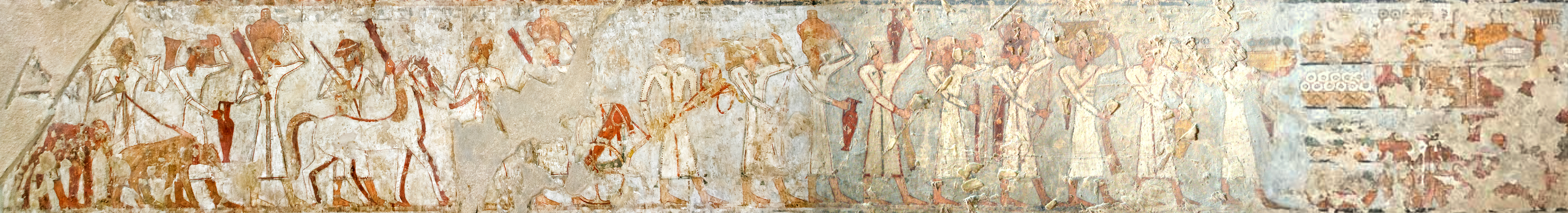
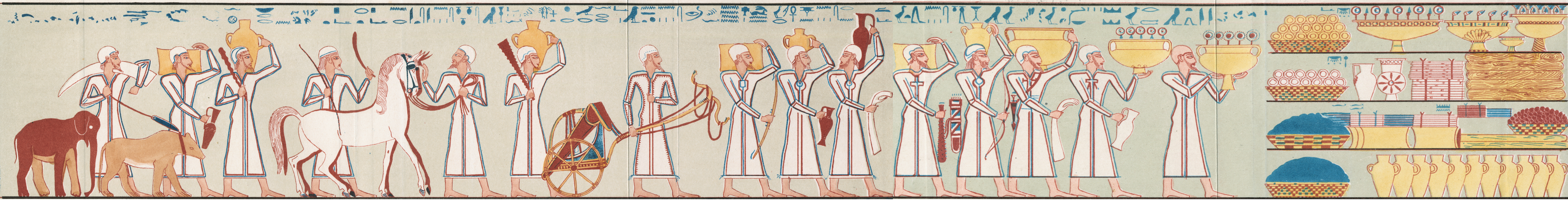
Depiction of Syrians bringing presents to Thutmose III, in the tomb of Rekhmire, c. 1400 BC (actual painting and interpretational drawing). They are labeled "Chiefs of Retjenu".

=== Campaign 8: Attack on Mitanni ===
In Year 33, after Thutmose III had taken control of the Syrian cities, the obvious target for his eighth campaign was the state of Mitanni, a Hurrian country with an Indo-Aryan ruling class. However, to reach Mitanni, he had to cross the Euphrates River. He sailed directly to Byblos and made boats which he took with him over land on what appeared to otherwise be just another tour of Syria, and he proceeded with the usual raiding and pillaging as he moved north through the lands he had already taken. He continued north through the territory belonging to the still unconquered cities of Aleppo and Carchemish and quickly crossed the Euphrates in his boats, taking the Mitannian king entirely by surprise. It appears that Mitanni was not expecting an invasion, so they had no army of any kind ready to defend against Thutmose III, although their ships on the Euphrates did try to defend against the Egyptian crossing. Thutmose III then went freely from city to city and pillaged them while the nobles hid in caves, or at least this is the typically propagandistic way Egyptian records chose to record it. During this period of no opposition, Thutmose III put up a second stele commemorating his crossing of the Euphrates River next to the stele his grandfather, Thutmose I, had put up several decades earlier. A militia was raised to fight the invaders, but it fared very poorly. Thutmose III then returned to Syria by way of Niy, where he records that he engaged in an elephant hunt. He collected tribute from foreign powers and returned to Egypt in victory.

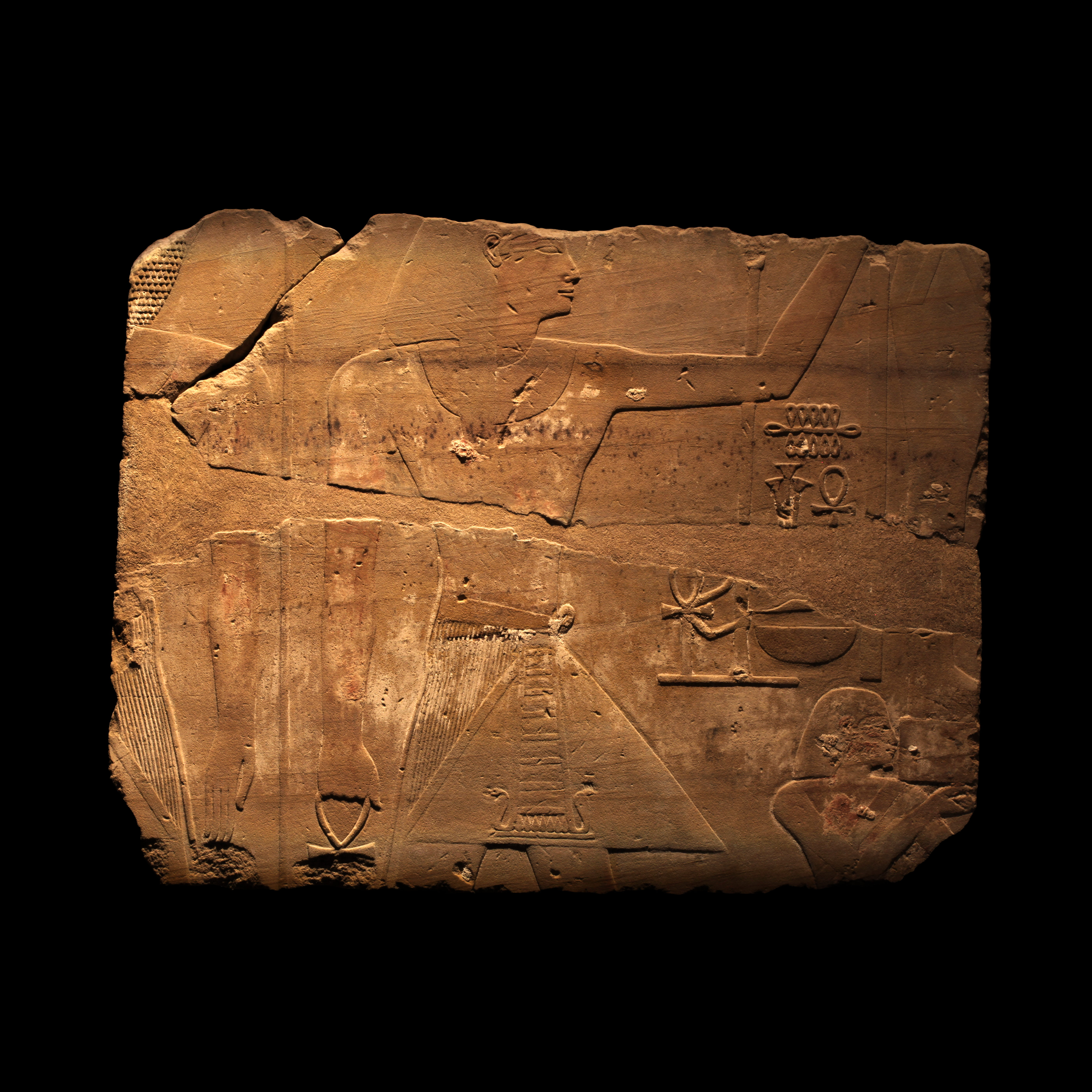
Thutmose III holding the statue of Min-MBA Lyon E501-IMG 0196

=== Campaigns 9–16: Tours of Syria ===
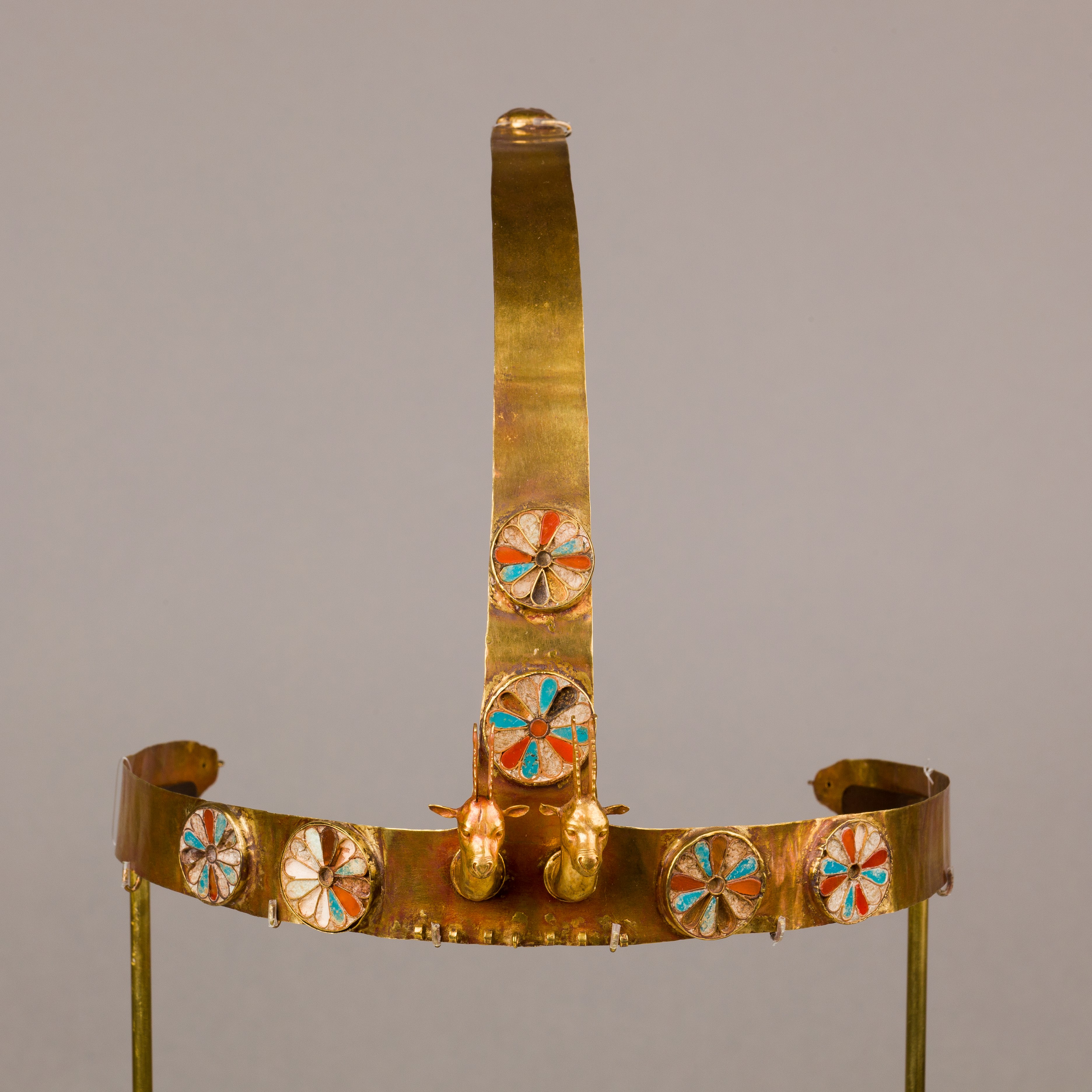
Crown of Thutmose III's Asiatic Princesses Menhet, Menwi and Merti

Thutmose III returned to Syria for his ninth campaign in his 34th year, but this appears to have been just a raid of the area called Nukhashshe, a region populated by semi-nomadic people. The plunder recorded is minimal, so it was probably just a minor raid. Records from his 10th campaign indicate much more fighting. By Thutmose III's 35th year, the king of Mitanni had raised a large army and engaged the Egyptians around Aleppo. As usual for any Egyptian king, Thutmose III boasted a total crushing victory, but this statement raises suspicion due to the very small amount of plunder taken. Thutmose III's annals at Karnak indicate he only took a total of 10 prisoners of war. He may have fought the Mitannians to a stalemate, yet he did receive tribute from the Hittites after that campaign, which seems to indicate the outcome of the battle was in Thutmose III's favor.

The details about his next two campaigns are unknown. His 11th is presumed to have happened in his 36th regnal year and his 12th is presumed to have happened in his 37th year since his 13th is mentioned at Karnak as happening in his 38th regnal year. Part of the tribute list for his 12th campaign remains immediately before his 13th begins, and the contents recorded, specifically wild game and certain minerals of uncertain identification, might indicate that it took place on the steppe around Nukhashshe, but this remains mere speculation.

In Year 38, Thutmose III conducted his 13th military campaign returning to Nuhašše for a very minor campaign.

His 14th campaign, waged during his 39th year, was against the Shasu. The location of this campaign is impossible to determine since the Shasu were nomads who could have lived anywhere from Lebanon to the Transjordan to Edom. After this campaign, the numbers given by Thutmose III's scribes to his campaigns all fall in lacunae, so they can only be counted by date.

In his 40th year, tribute was collected from foreign powers, but it is unknown if this was considered a campaign (i.e. if the king went with it or if it was led by an official).

Only the tribute list remains from Thutmose III's next campaign, and nothing may be deduced about it except that it was probably another raid to the frontiers around Niy.

His final Asian campaign is better documented. Sometime before Thutmose III's 42nd year, Mitanni apparently began spreading revolt among all the major cities in Syria. Thutmose III moved his troops by land up the coastal road and put down rebellions in the Arka plain ("Arkantu" in Thutmose III's chronicle) and moved on Tunip. After taking Tunip, his attention turned to Kadesh again. He engaged and destroyed three surrounding Mitannian garrisons and returned to Egypt in victory. His victory in this final campaign was neither complete nor permanent since he did not take Kadesh, and Tunip could not have remained aligned to him for very long, certainly not beyond his own death. This victory however, must have had quite an impact, for the next tribute lists include Adana, a Cilician city.

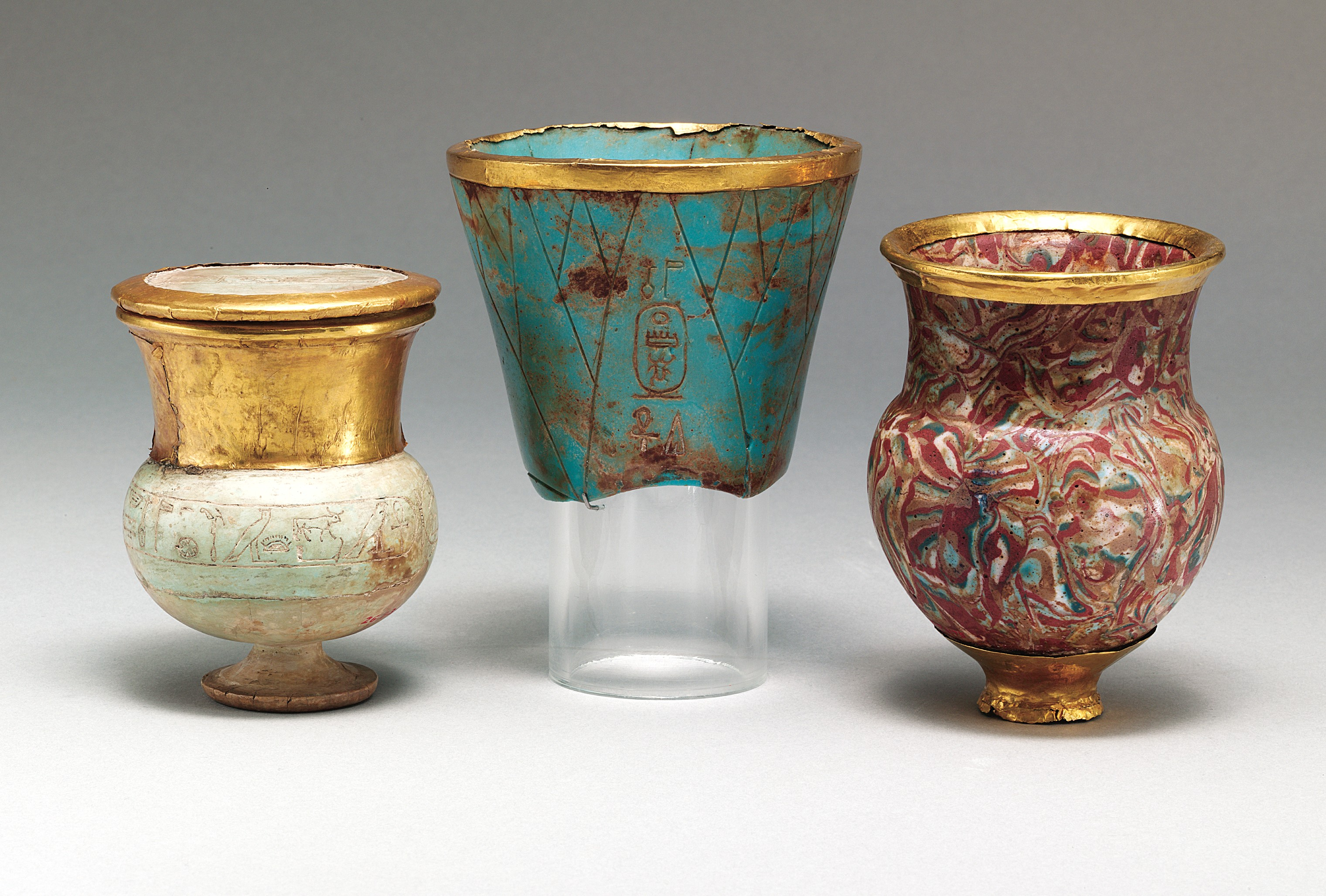
Jar, wide-necked, krateriskos, inscribed for Thutmose III

=== Campaign 17: Nubian campaign ===
In Year 50, Thutmose III waged his last military campaign. He attacked Nubia, but only went so far as the fourth cataract of the Nile. Although no king of Egypt had ever penetrated so far with an army, previous kings' campaigns had spread Egyptian culture that far already, and the earliest Egyptian document found at Gebel Barkal dates from three years before Thutmose III's campaign.

== Monuments ==
Thutmose III, a great builder, constructed more than 50 temples. Some are now lost, recorded only in written records. He also commissioned the building of many tombs for nobles, which were made with greater craftsmanship than ever before. His reign saw stylistic changes in the sculpture, paintings and reliefs associated with construction, much of it beginning during the reign of Hatshepsut.

=== Artistic developments ===
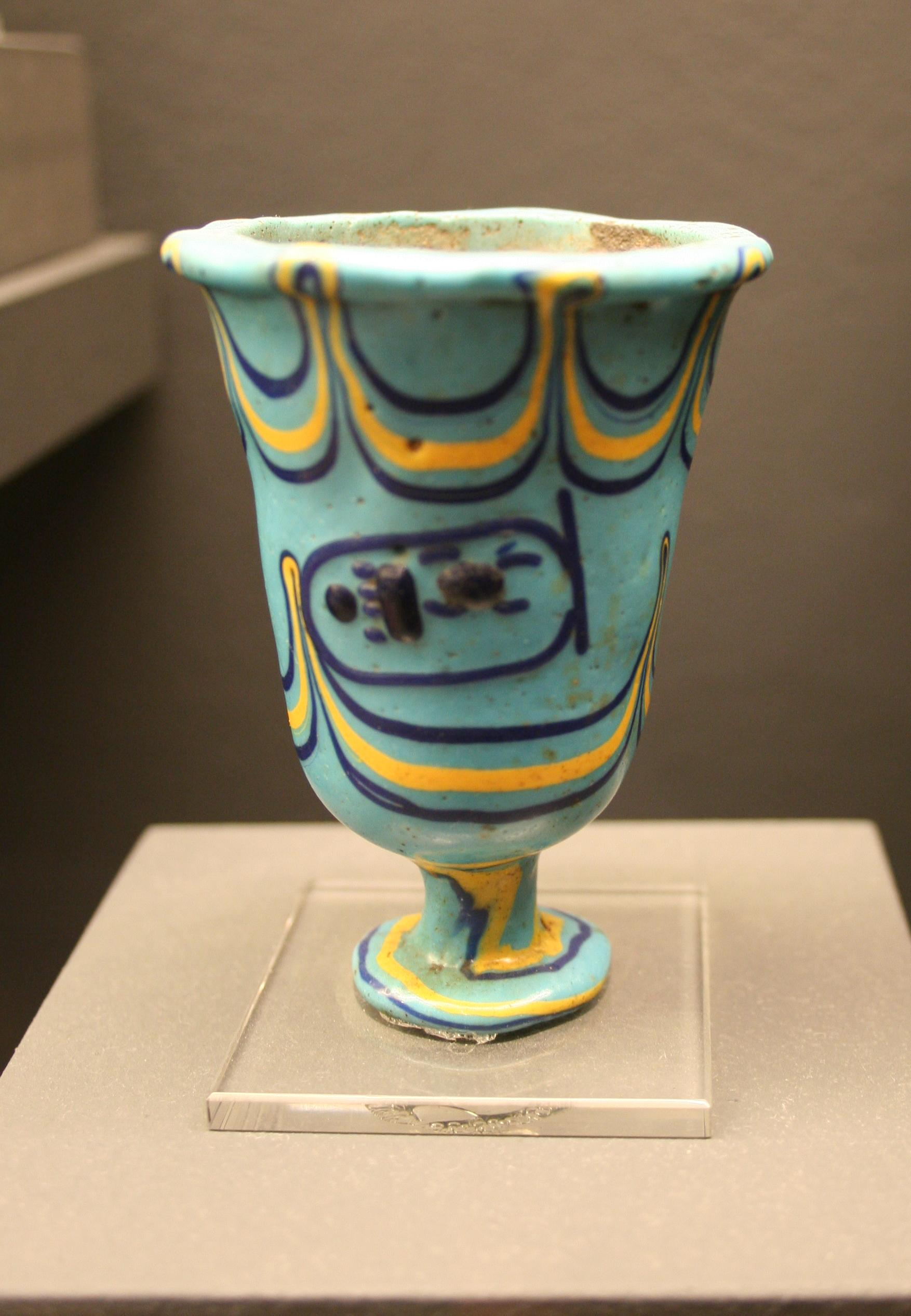
Glass making advanced during the reign of Thutmose III and this cup bears his name

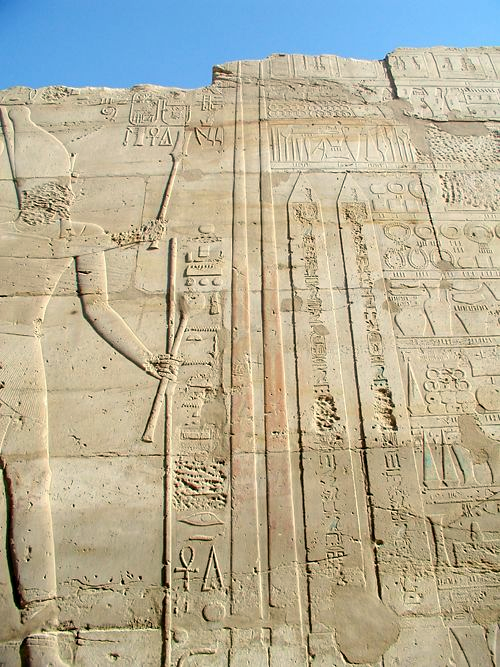
Depiction of Tuthmose III at Karnak holding a Hedj Club and a Sekhem Scepter standing before two obelisks he had erected there

Thutmose III's architects and artisans followed traditional relief styles for most of his reign. But after his 42nd year he is depicted wearing the red crown of Lower Egypt and a šndyt-kilt, an unprecedented style. Architecturally, his use of pillars was unprecedented. He built Egypt's only known set of heraldic pillars, two large columns standing alone instead of being part of a set supporting the roof. His jubilee hall was arguably the earliest known building created in the basilica style. Thutmose III's artisans achieved new heights of skill in painting, and tombs from his reign were the earliest to be entirely painted instead of painted reliefs. It appears that Thutmose III's artisans learned glass-making skills, developed in the early 18th Dynasty, to create drinking vessels by the core-formed method.

=== Karnak ===
Thutmose III dedicated far more attention to Karnak than any other site. In the Iput-isut, the temple proper in the center, he rebuilt the hypostyle hall of his grandfather Thutmose I, dismantled the red chapel of Hatshepsut, built Pylon VI, a shrine for the bark of Amun in its place, and built an antechamber in front of it, the ceiling of which was supported by his heraldic pillars. He built a temenos wall around the central chapel containing smaller chapels, along with workshops and storerooms. East of the main sanctuary, he built a jubilee hall in which to celebrate his Sed festival. The main hall was built in basilica style with rows of pillars supporting the ceiling on each side of the aisle. The central two rows were higher than the others to create windows where the ceiling was split. Two of the smaller rooms in this temple contained the reliefs of the survey of the plants and animals of Canaan which he took in his third campaign.

East of the Iput-Isut, he erected another temple to Aten, where he was depicted as being supported by Amun. It was inside this temple that Thutmose III planned on erecting his tekhen waty, or "unique obelisk." The tekhen waty was designed to stand alone instead as part of a pair and is the tallest obelisk ever successfully cut. It was not, however, erected until Thutmose IV raised it 35 years later. It was later moved to Rome by Emperor Constantius II and is now known as the Lateran Obelisk.

In 390, Roman Emperor Theodosius I re-erected another obelisk from the Temple of Karnak in the Hippodrome of Constantinople, now known as the Obelisk of Theodosius.

Thutmose III also undertook building projects to the south of the main temple between the sanctuary of Amun and the temple of Mut. Immediately to the south of the main temple, he built the seventh pylon on the north–south road which entered the temple between the fourth and fifth pylons. It was built for use during his jubilee and was covered with scenes of defeated enemies. He set royal colossi on both sides of the pylon and put two more obelisks on the south face in front of the gateway. The eastern obelisk's base remains in place, but the western obelisk was transported to the Hippodrome in Constantinople. Farther south along the road, he put up Pylon VIII, which Hatshepsut had begun. East of the road, he dug a sacred lake of 250 by 400 feet and placed another alabaster bark shrine near it.

Additionally, he commissioned royal artists to depict his extensive collections of fauna and flora in a botanical garden.

=== Other attestations ===
At Heliopolis, a stela dated to year 47 of Thutmose III.

=== Defacing of Hatshepsut's monuments ===
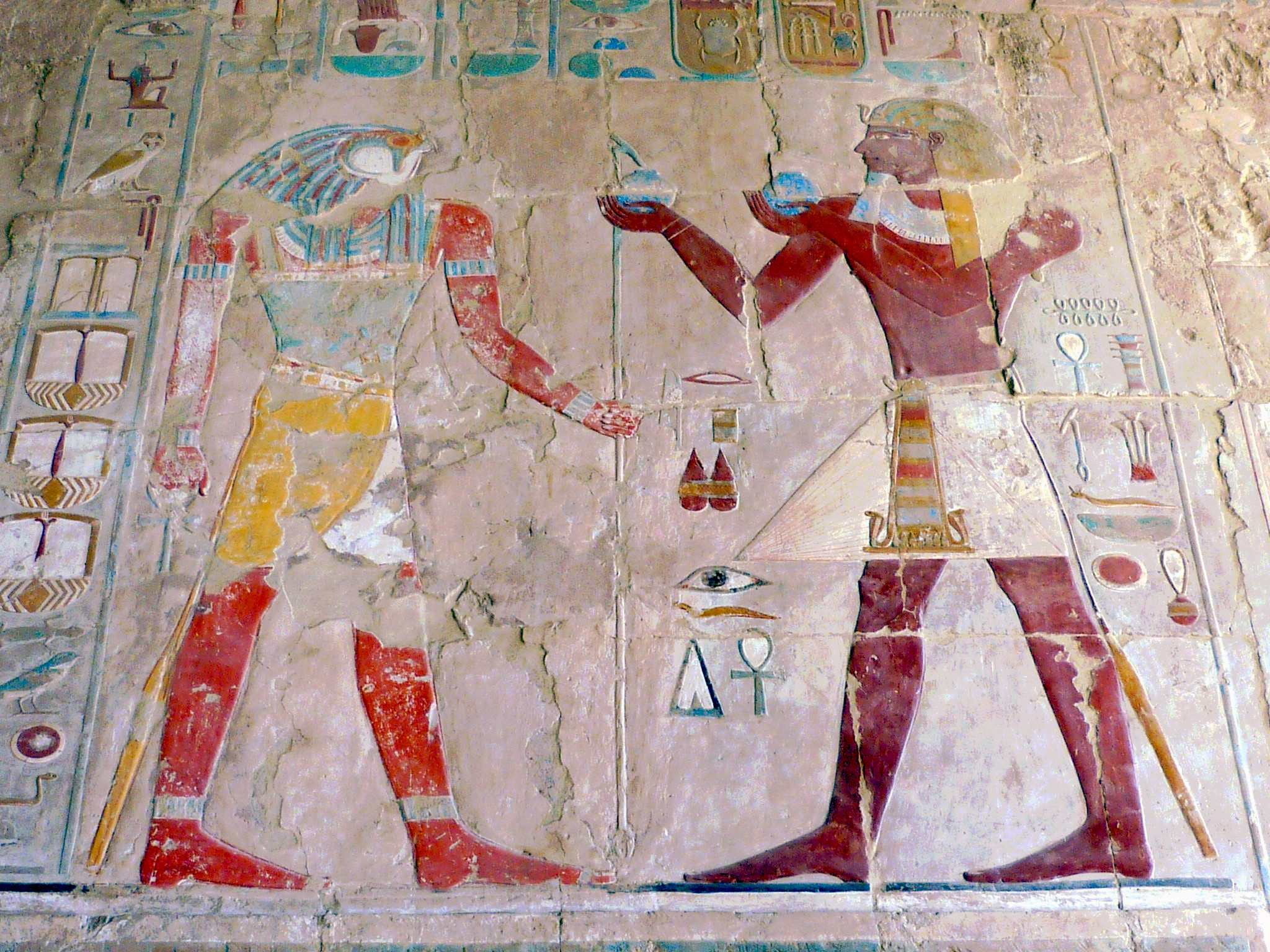
Sokaris receiving gifts from Thutmosis III in Anubis temple, Hatshepsut temple, Deir el-Bahari, Theban Necropolis, Egypt

For many years, egyptologists theorized that following the death of Thutmose II, his queen Hatshepsut usurped the throne from her stepson Thutmose III. Although Thutmose III was co-regent during this time, early historians have speculated that he never forgave his stepmother for overshadowing him. Some time after her death, many of Hatshepsut's monuments and depictions were defaced or destroyed, including those in her famous mortuary temple complex at Deir el-Bahari. These were interpreted by early modern scholars as damnatio memoriae (erasure from recorded existence) by Thutmose III in a fit of vengeful rage shortly after his accession.

However, recent research casts serious doubt upon the popular theory of Thutmose III's vengeance. Scholars such as Charles Nims and Peter Dorman have re-examined the erasures and found that those which could be dated only began during year 46 or 47, toward the end of Thutmose III's reign (c. 1433 or 1432 BC). Also the monuments of Hatshepsut's chief steward, Senenmut, closely associated with her rule, were similarly defaced where they were found. Furthermore, it is known that Hatshepsut trusted Thutmose III to command her armies. No strong evidence has been found that Thutmose III sought to claim the throne, and after her death he kept her religious and administrative leaders. He even built his mortuary temple directly next to Hatshepsut's, showing no grudge against her.

By the time the monuments of Hatshepsut were damaged, at least 25 years after her death, the elderly Thutmose III was in a coregency with his son Amenhotep II. Currently, the purposeful destruction of the memory of Hatshepsut is seen as an attempt to ensure a smooth succession for Amenhotep II, as opposed to any of the surviving relatives of Hatshepsut with an equal or better claim to the throne. Amenhotep II would have had a motive because his position in the royal lineage was not so strong as to assure his elevation to pharaoh. Later, Amenhotep II even claimed that he had built the structures he defaced. It may also be that the attack on Hatshepsut's memory could not be taken until the death of powerful religious and administrative officials who had served under both Hatshepsut and Thutmose III.

== Death and burial ==
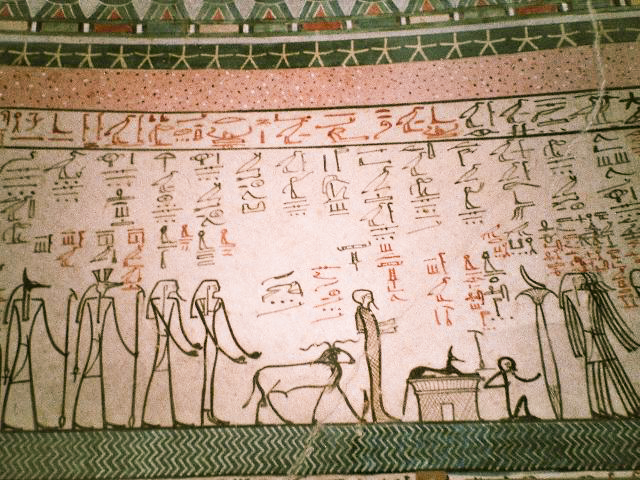
A scene from the Amduat on the walls of the tomb of Thutmose III, KV34, in the Valley of the Kings

According to Peter Der Manuelian, a statement in the tomb biography of the official Amenemheb establishes that Thutmose III died in Year 54, III Peret day 30 of his reign after ruling Egypt for "53 years, 10 months and 26 days" (Urk. 180.15), corresponding to 11 March 1425 BC. Thutmose III died one month and four days before the start of his 54th regnal year. When the co-regencies with Hatshepsut and Amenhotep II are deducted, he ruled as sole pharaoh for just over 30 years.

Thutmose III's tomb (KV34) was discovered by Victor Loret in 1898 in the Valley of the Kings. Its plan is typical of 18th Dynasty tombs, with a sharp turn at the vestibule preceding the burial chamber. Two stairways and two corridors provide access to the vestibule, which is preceded by a quadrangular shaft or "well".

A complete version of Amduat, an important New Kingdom funerary text, is in the vestibule, making it the first tomb where the complete text was found. The burial chamber, supported by two pillars, is oval-shaped and its ceiling decorated with stars, symbolizing the cave of the deity Sokar. In the middle lies a large red quartzite sarcophagus in the shape of a cartouche. On the two pillars in the middle of the chamber are passages from the Litanies of Re celebrating the later sun deity, who was identified with the pharaoh at this time. On the other pillar is a unique image depicting Thutmosis III being suckled by the goddess Isis in the guise of the tree.

The wall decorations are executed in a simple "diagrammatic" way, imitating the manner of the cursive script of a funerary papyrus rather than the more lavish wall decorations typical of most other royal tombs. The colouring is similarly muted, executed in simple black figures accompanied by text on a cream background with highlights in red and pink. The decorations depict the pharaoh aiding the deities in defeating Apep, the serpent of chaos, thereby helping to ensure the daily rebirth of the sun as well as the pharaoh's own resurrection.

=== Mummy ===
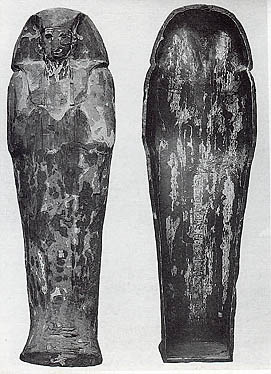
Sarcophagus of Thutmose III

Thutmose III's mummy was discovered in the Deir el-Bahari Cache above the Mortuary Temple of Hatshepsut in 1881. He was interred along with those of other 18th and 19th Dynasty leaders Ahmose I, Amenhotep I, Thutmose I, Thutmose II, Ramesses I, Seti I, Ramesses II, and Ramesses IX, as well as the 21st Dynasty pharaohs Pinedjem I, Pinedjem II, and Siamun.

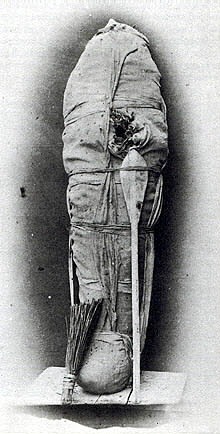
Mummy of Thutmose III before unwrapping, showing damage by tomb robbers

While it is popularly thought that his mummy originally was unwrapped by Gaston Maspero in 1886, it was in fact first unwrapped by Émile Brugsch, the Egyptologist who supervised the evacuation of the mummies from the Deir el-Bahari Cache in 1881. It was unwrapped soon after its arrival in the Boulak Museum while Maspero was away in France, and the Director General of the Egyptian Antiquities Service ordered the mummy re-wrapped, but not before Brugsch recovered a copy of the Litany of Re from its shroud. So when it was "officially" unwrapped by Maspero in 1886, he almost certainly knew it was in relatively poor condition.

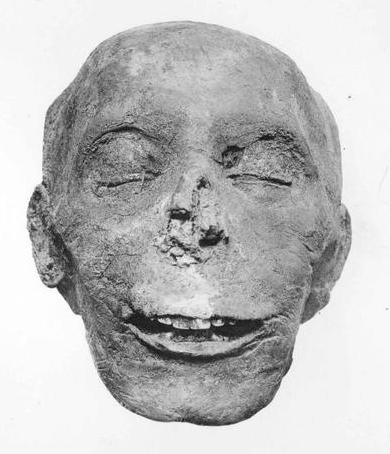
Mummified head of Thutmose III following unwrapping

The mummy had been damaged extensively in antiquity by tomb robbers and its wrappings subsequently cut into and torn by the Rassul family, who had rediscovered the tomb and its contents only a few years before. Maspero's description of the body provides an idea as to the severity of the damage:

His mummy was not securely hidden away, for towards the close of the 20th dynasty it was torn out of the coffin by robbers, who stripped it and rifled it of the jewels with which it was covered, injuring it in their haste to carry away the spoil. It was subsequently re-interred, and has remained undisturbed until the present day; but before re-burial some renovation of the wrappings was necessary, and as portions of the body had become loose, the restorers, in order to give the mummy the necessary firmness, compressed it between four oar-shaped slips of wood, painted white, and placed, three inside the wrappings and one outside, under the bands which confined the winding-sheet.

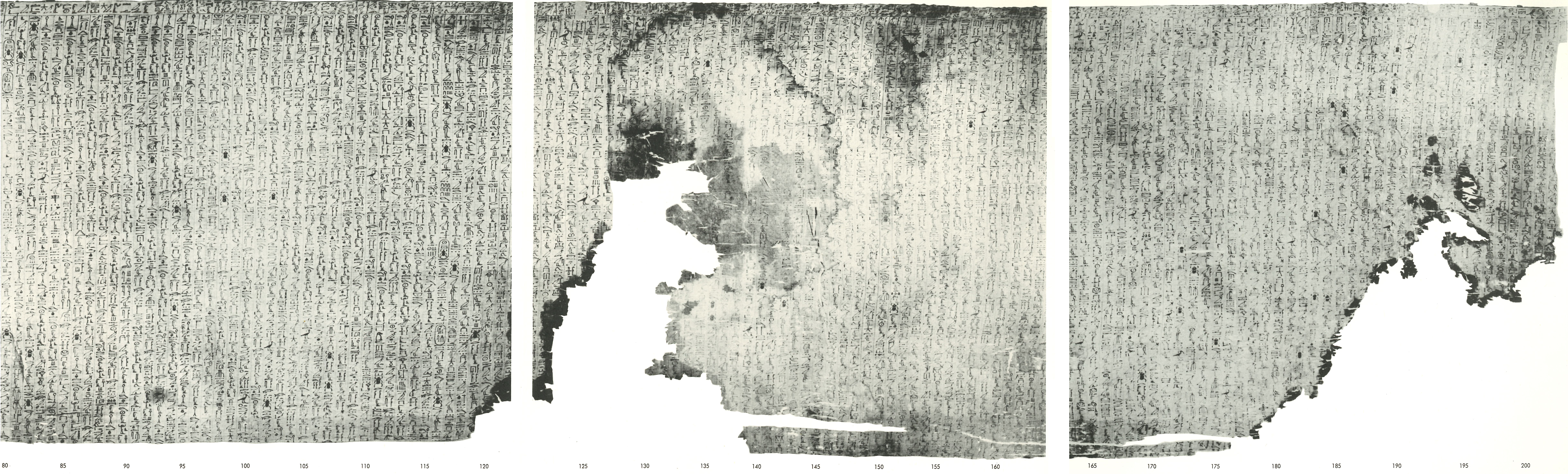
Thutmose III's burial shroud following unwrapping, which was revealed to contain the complete text of the Litany of Re

Of the face, which was undamaged, Maspero says the following:

Happily the face, which had been plastered over with pitch at the time of embalming, did not suffer at all from this rough treatment, and appeared intact when the protecting mask was removed. Its appearance does not answer to our ideal of the conqueror. His statues, though not representing him as a type of manly beauty, yet give him refined, intelligent features, but a comparison with the mummy shows that the artists have idealised their model. The forehead is abnormally low, the eyes deeply sunk, the jaw heavy, the lips thick, and the cheek-bones extremely prominent; the whole recalling the physiognomy of Thûtmosis II, though with a greater show of energy.

Maspero was so disheartened at the state of the mummy and the prospect that all of the other mummies were similarly damaged (as it turned out, few were in so poor a state) that he would not unwrap another for several years.

Unlike many other examples from the Deir el-Bahri Cache, the wooden mummiform coffin that contained the body was original to the pharaoh, though any gilding or decoration it might have had had been hacked off in antiquity.

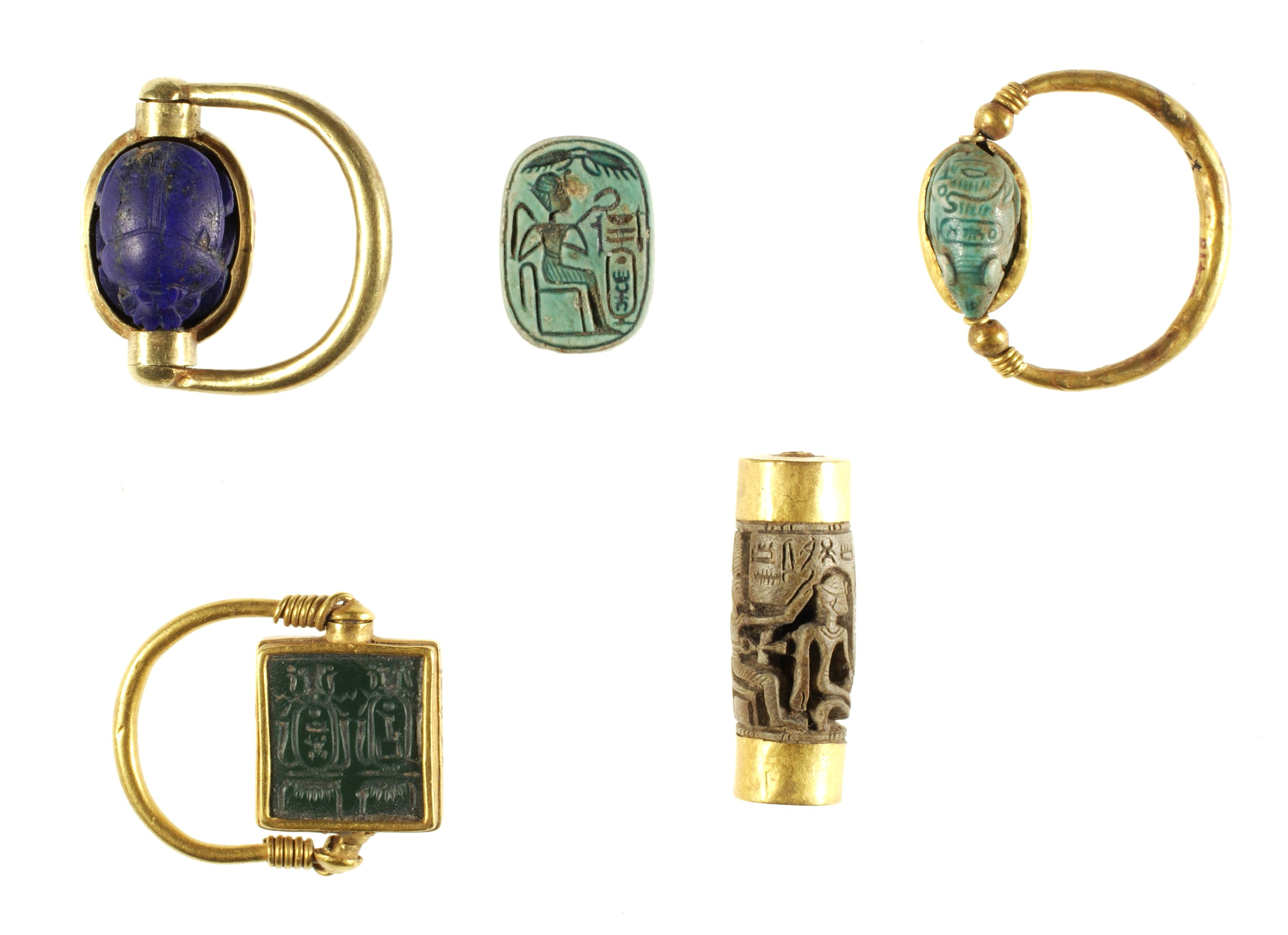
Beads and scarab finger rings of Thutmose III in the Metropolitan Museum of Art

In his examination of the mummy, the anatomist Grafton Smith stated the height of Thutmose III's mummy to be 1.615 m (5 ft 3.58 in), but the mummy was missing its feet, so Thutmose III was taller than the figure given by Smith. It resided in the Royal Mummies Hall of the Museum of Egyptian Antiquities, catalog number CG 61068, until April 2021 when the mummy was moved to National Museum of Egyptian Civilization along with those of 17 other kings and four queens in the Pharaohs' Golden Parade.

== Ancestry ==
Ancestors of Thutmose III

Thutmose I
Senseneb
Thutmose II
Mutnofret
Thutmose III
Iset

== Gallery ==
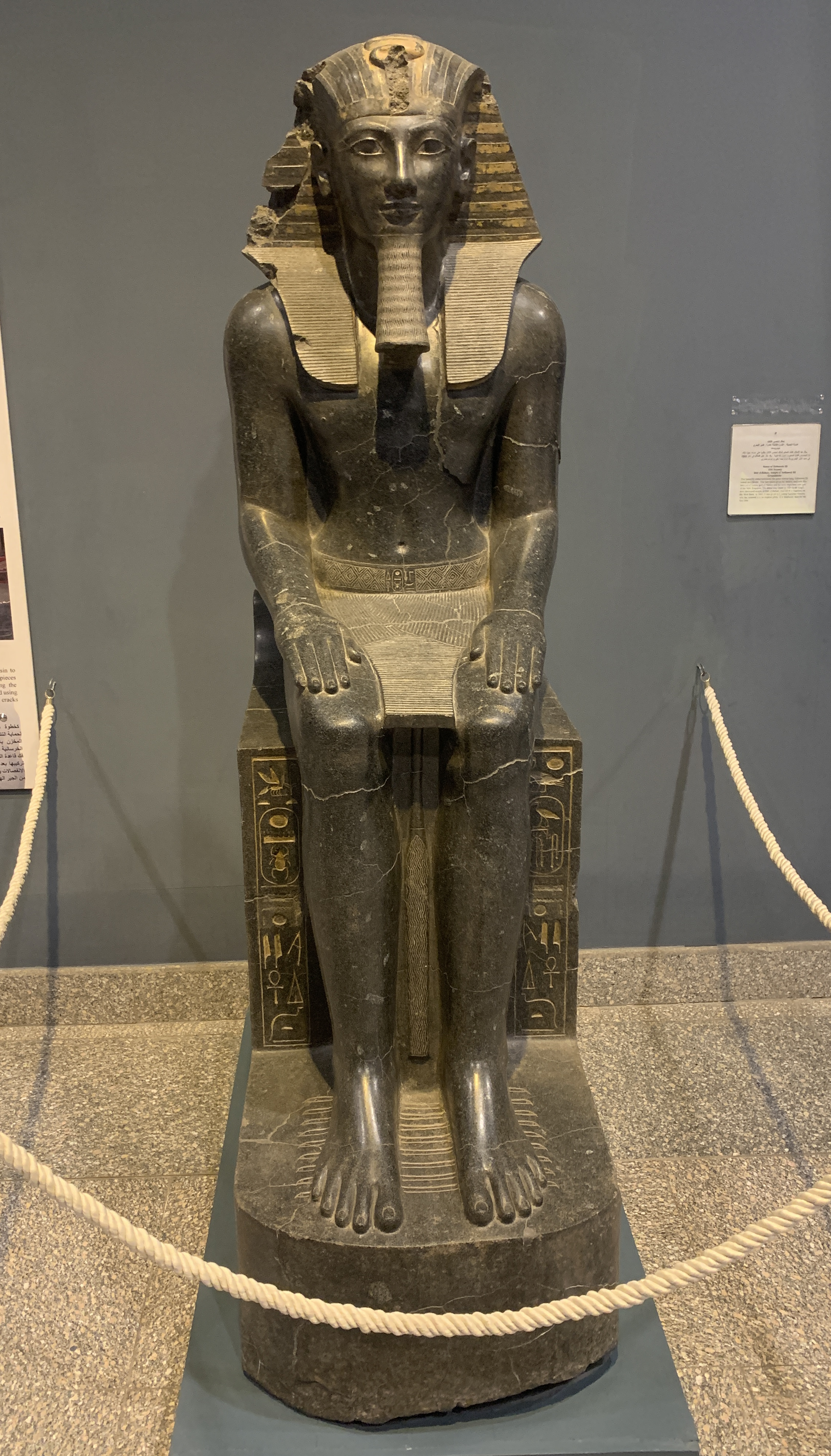
Cult statue of Thutmose III from his mortuary temple, now at the Luxor Museum, Luxor

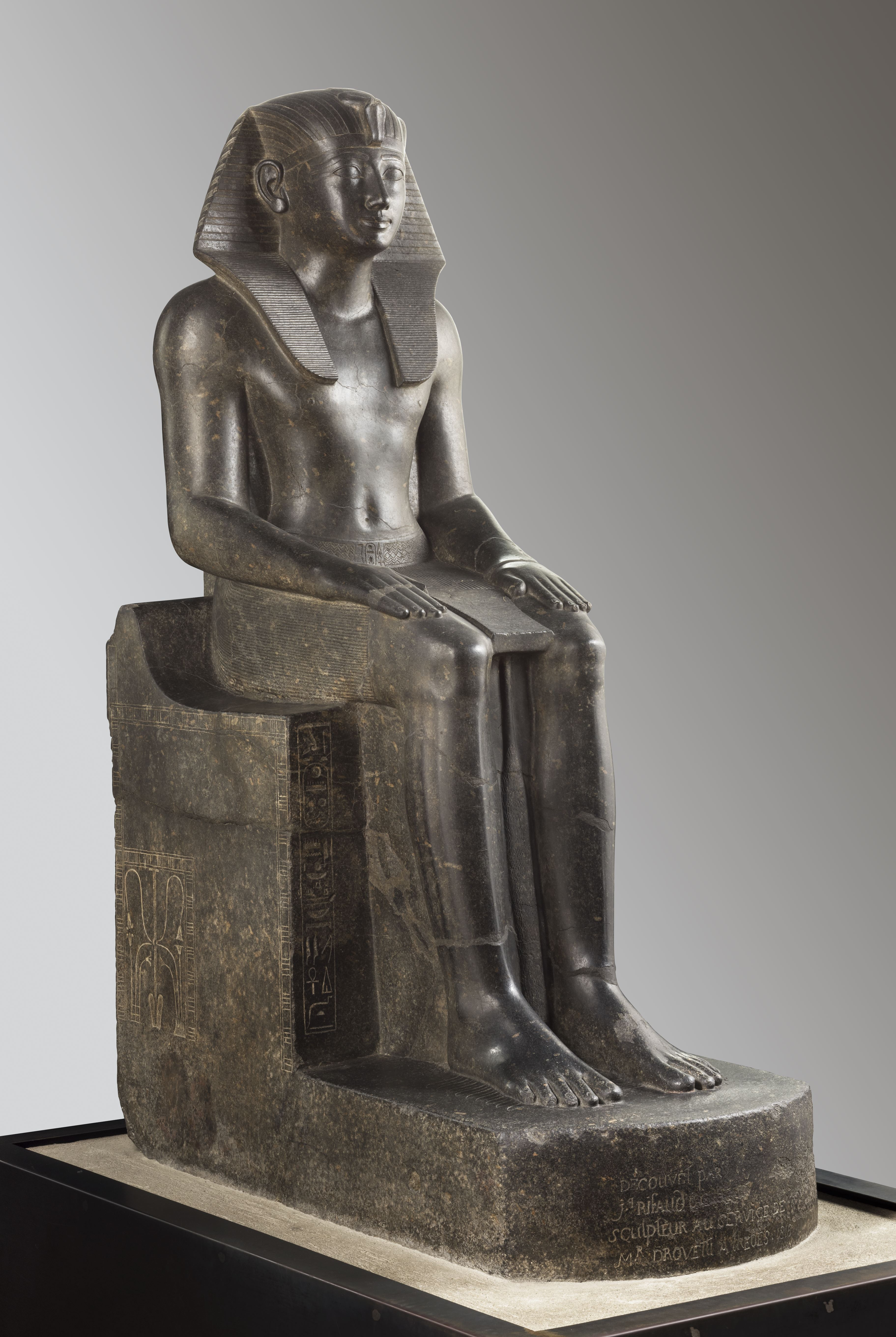
Statue of Thutmose III in the Museo Egizio, Turin

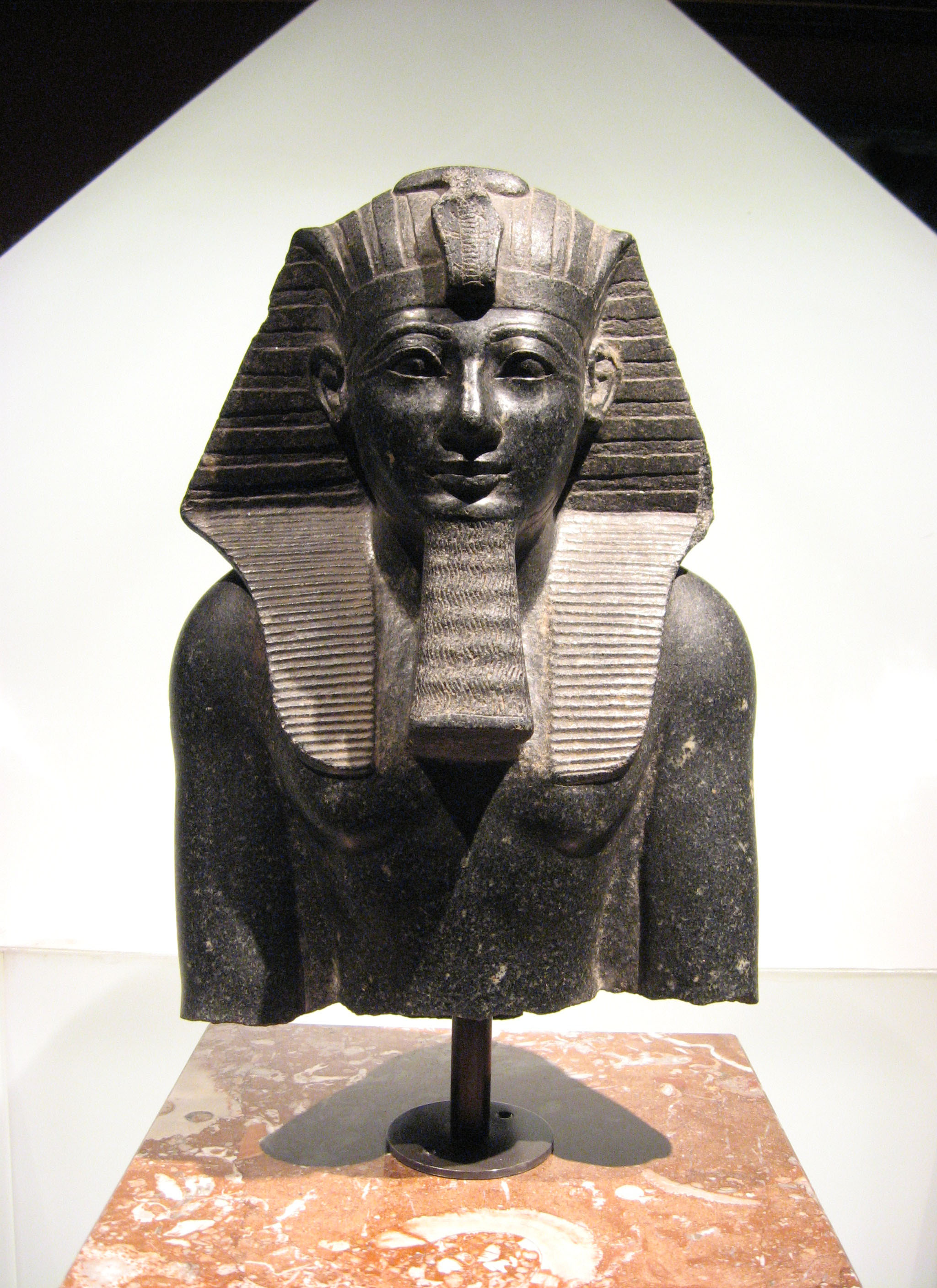
Upper part of a statue of Thutmose III from the Kunsthistorisches Museum

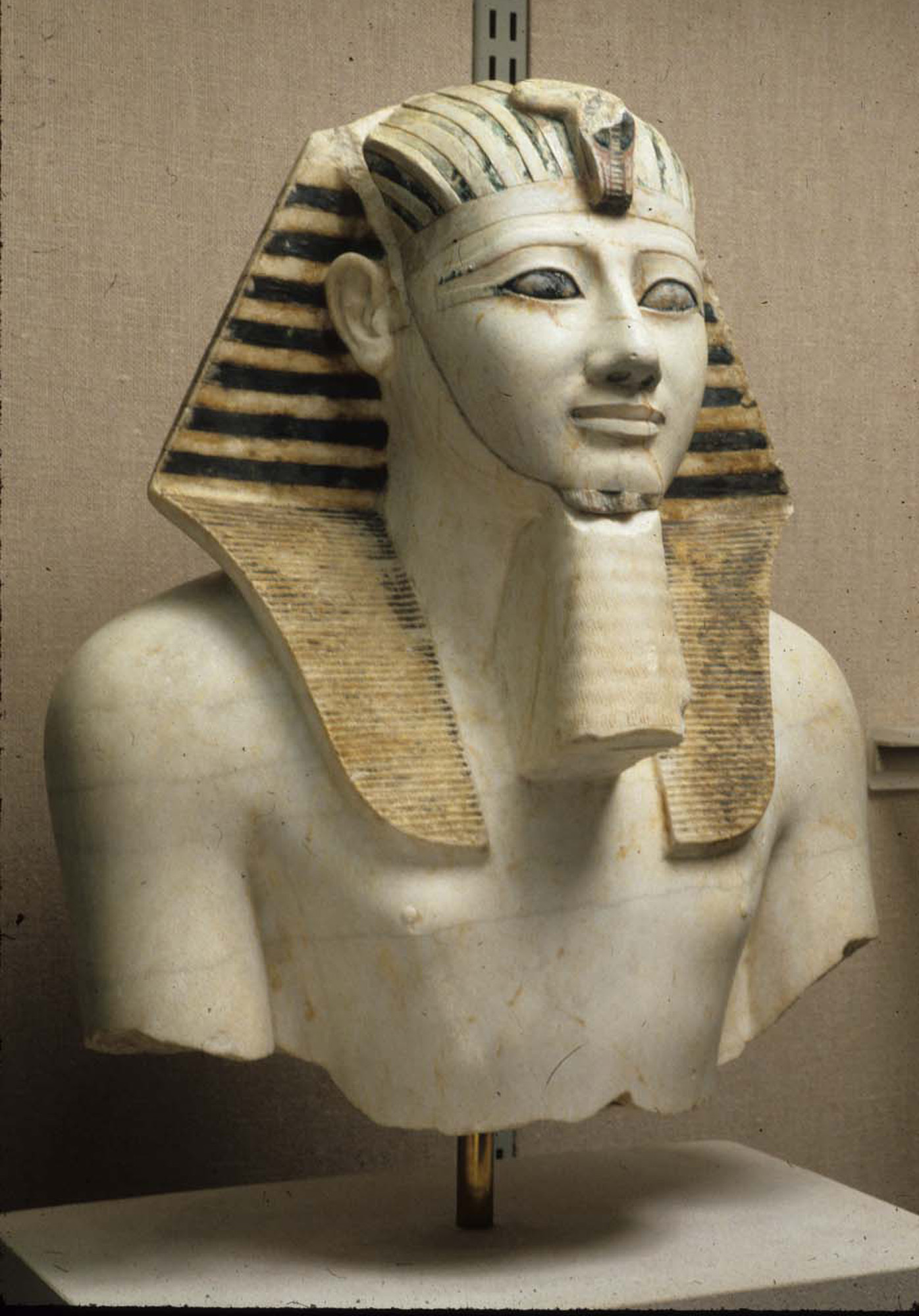
Upper part of a statue of Thutmose III from the Metropolitan Museum of Art

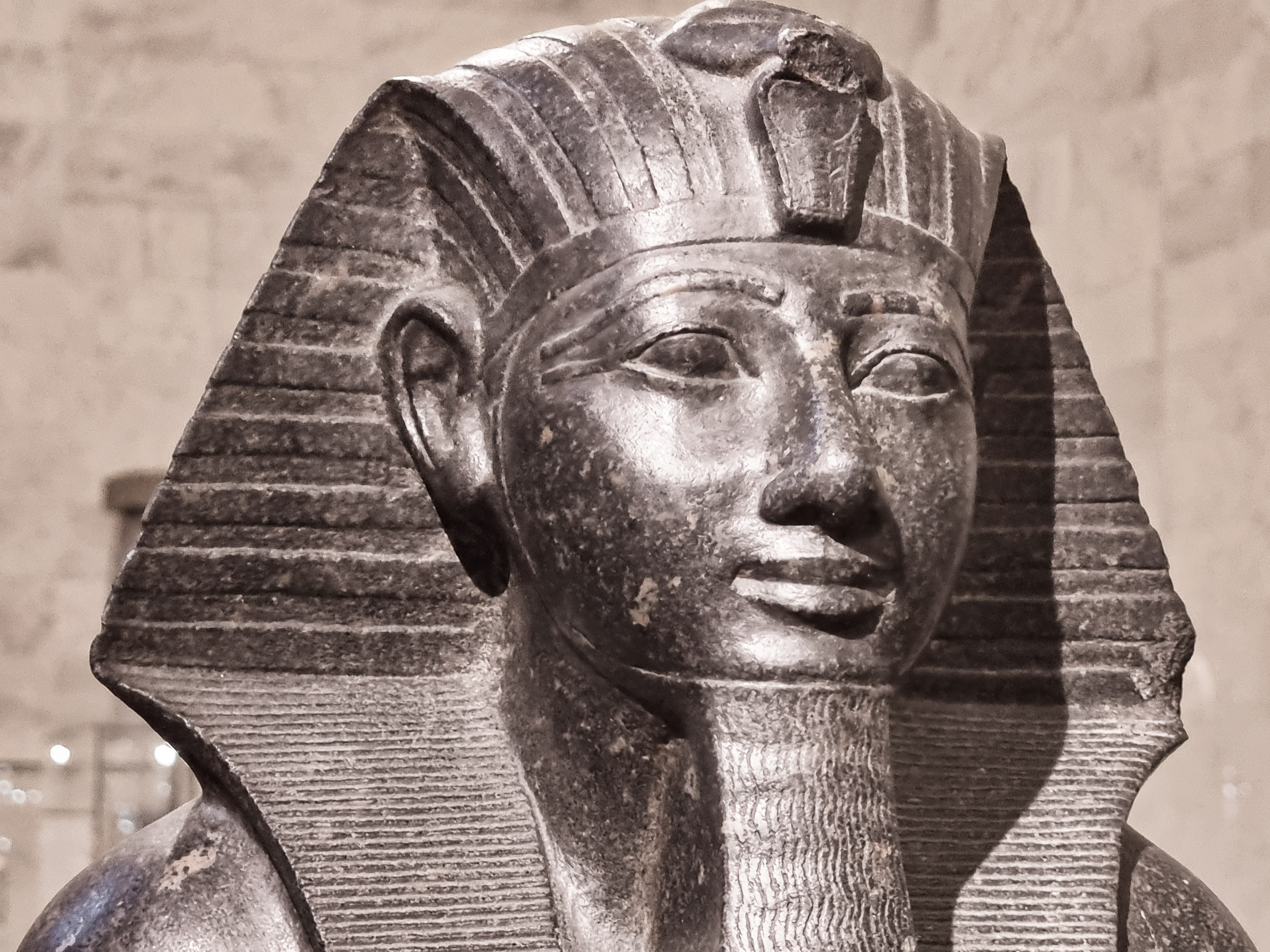
Upper part of a statue of Thutmose III from Karnak; National Museum of Egyptian Civilization, Cairo

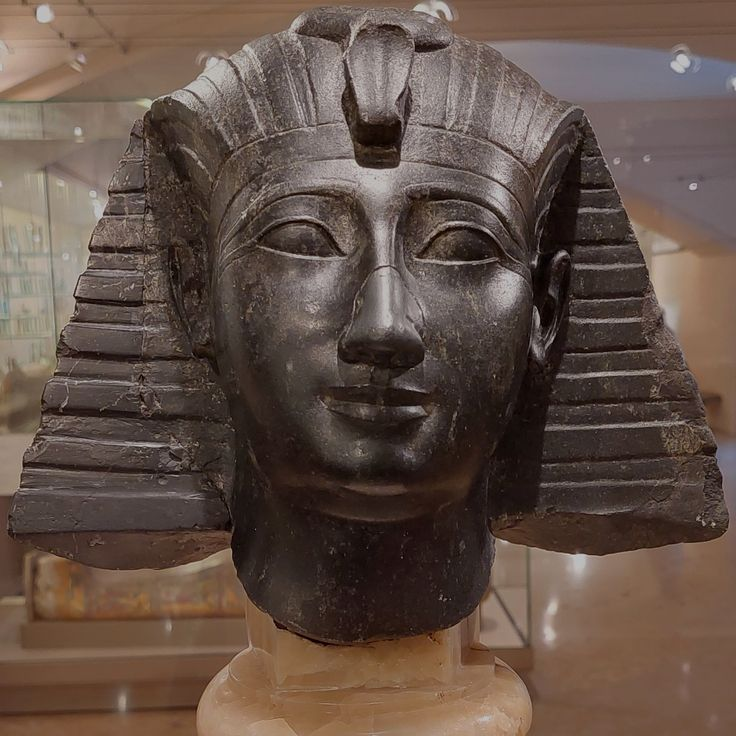
Head of a statue of Thutmose III from the Archaeological Civic Museum of Bologna

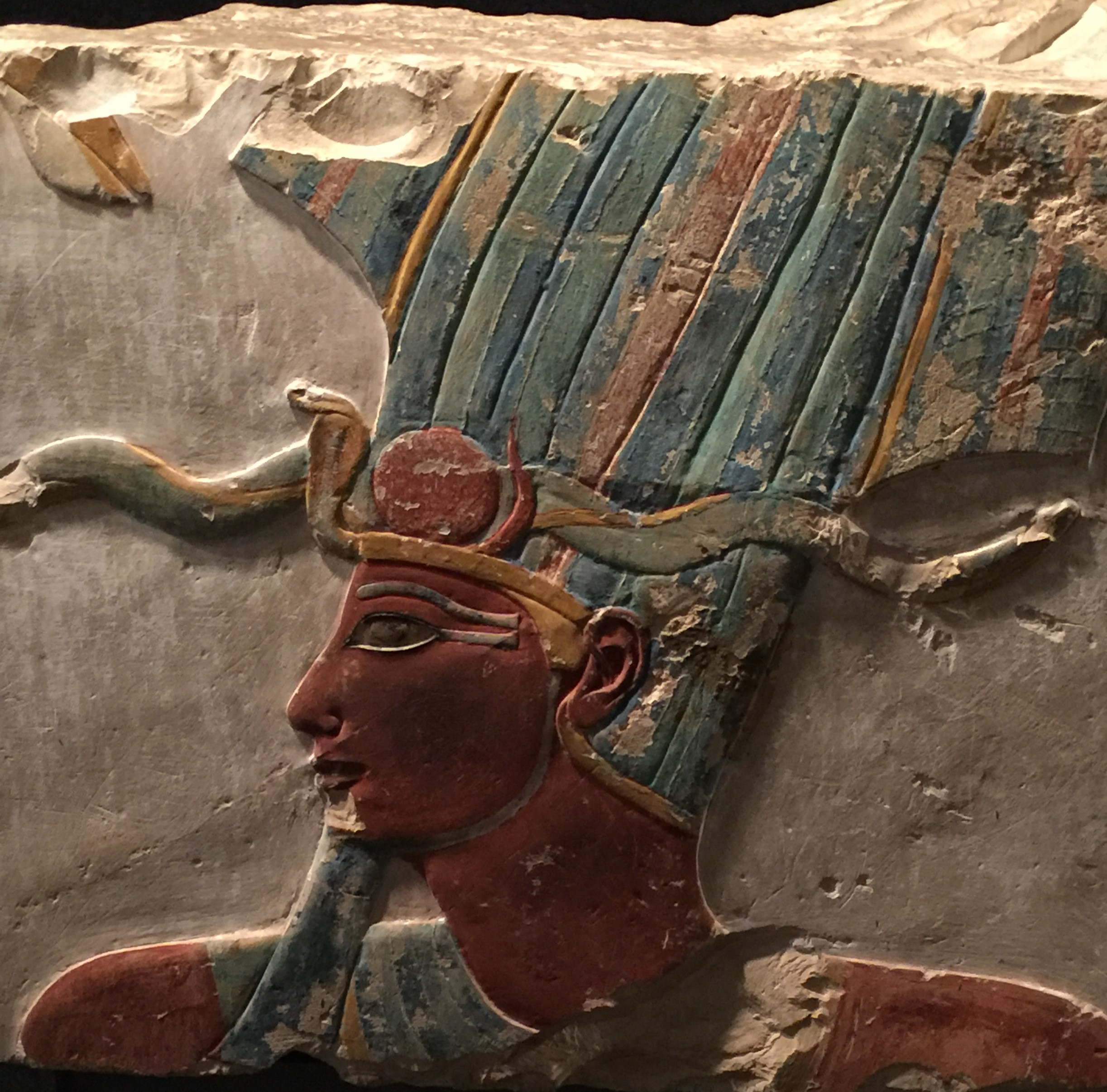
Painted relief depicting Thutmose III, Luxor Museum

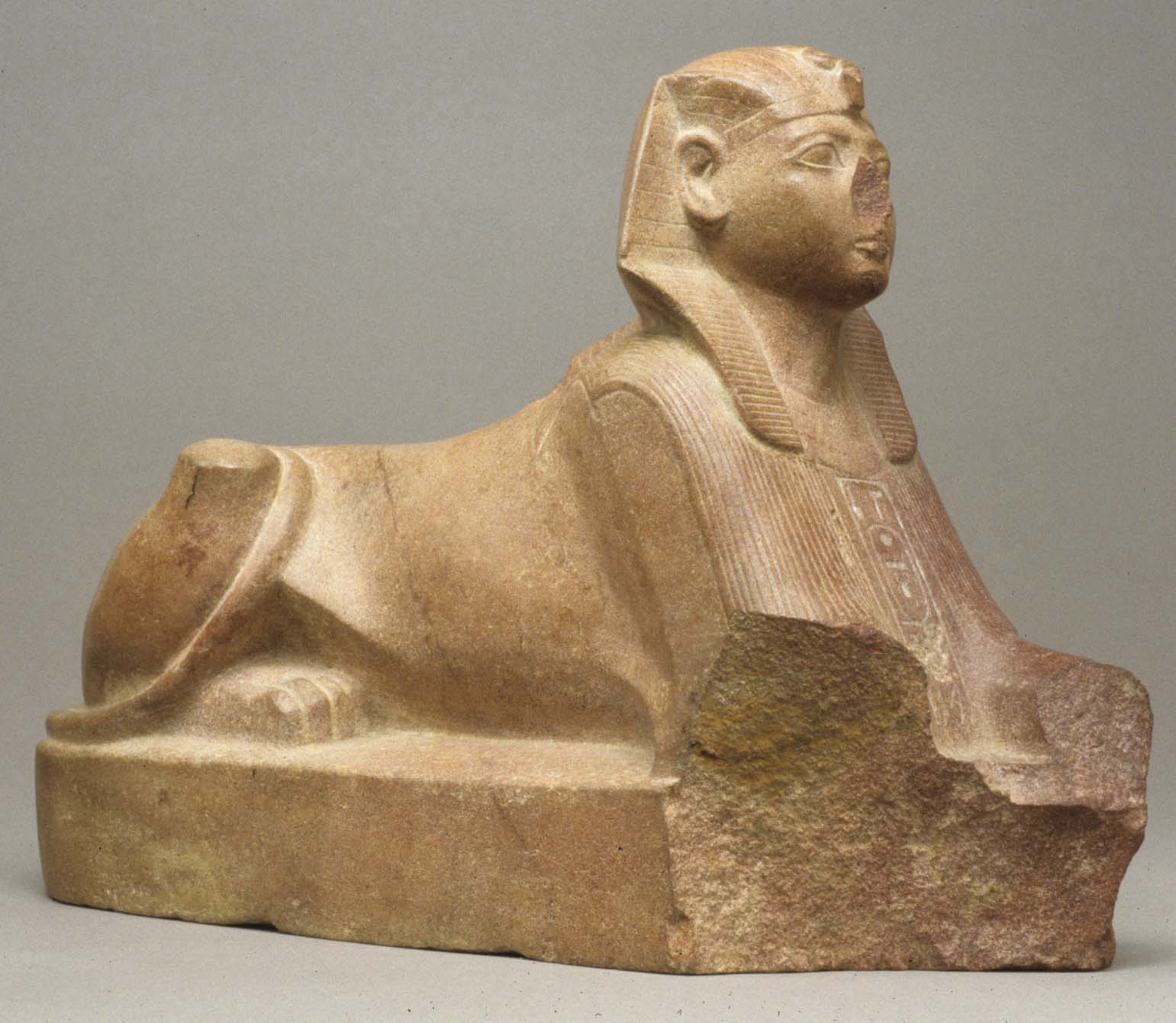
Sphinx of Thutmose III

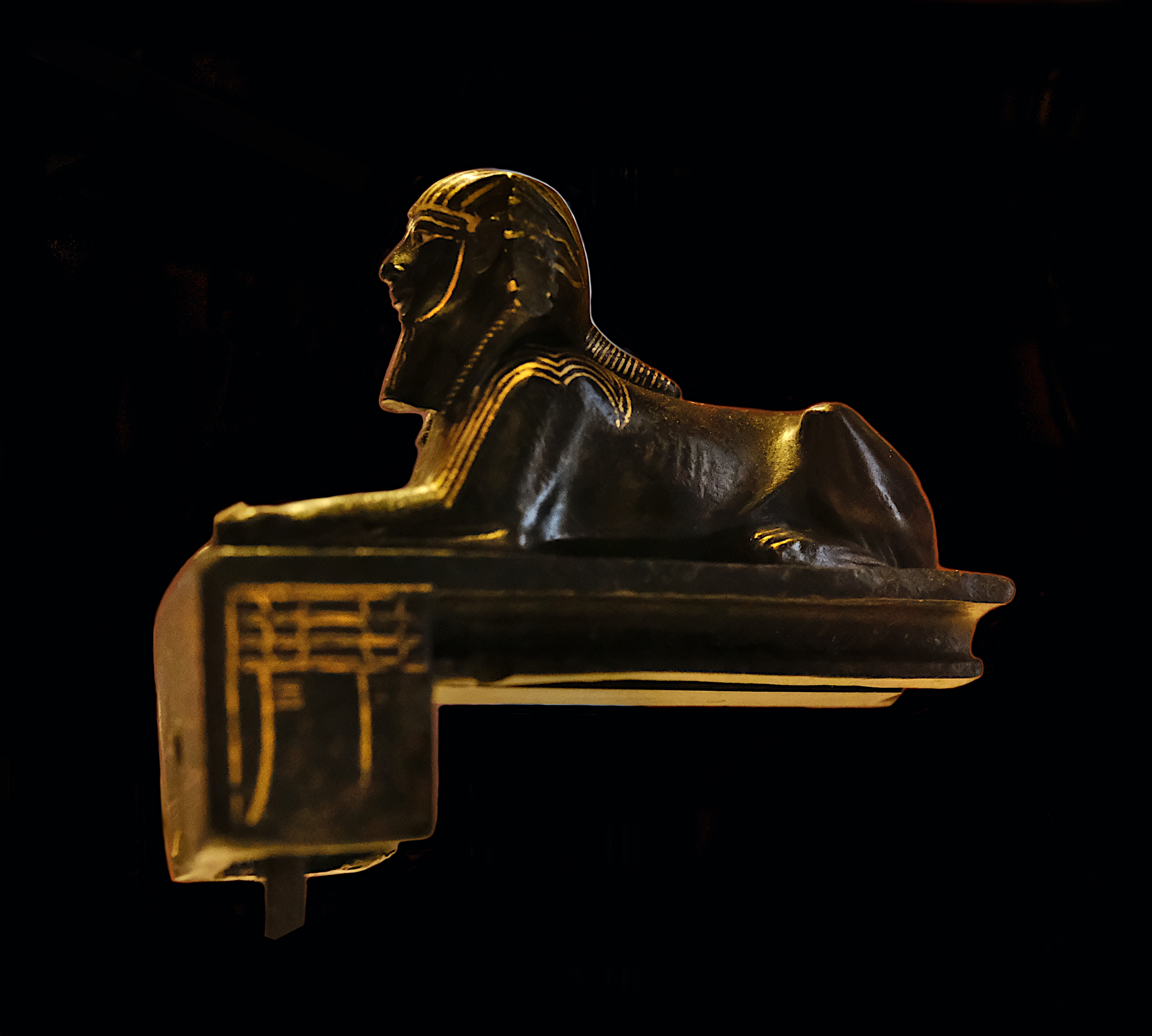
Sphinx of Thutmose III (Louvre, E10897)

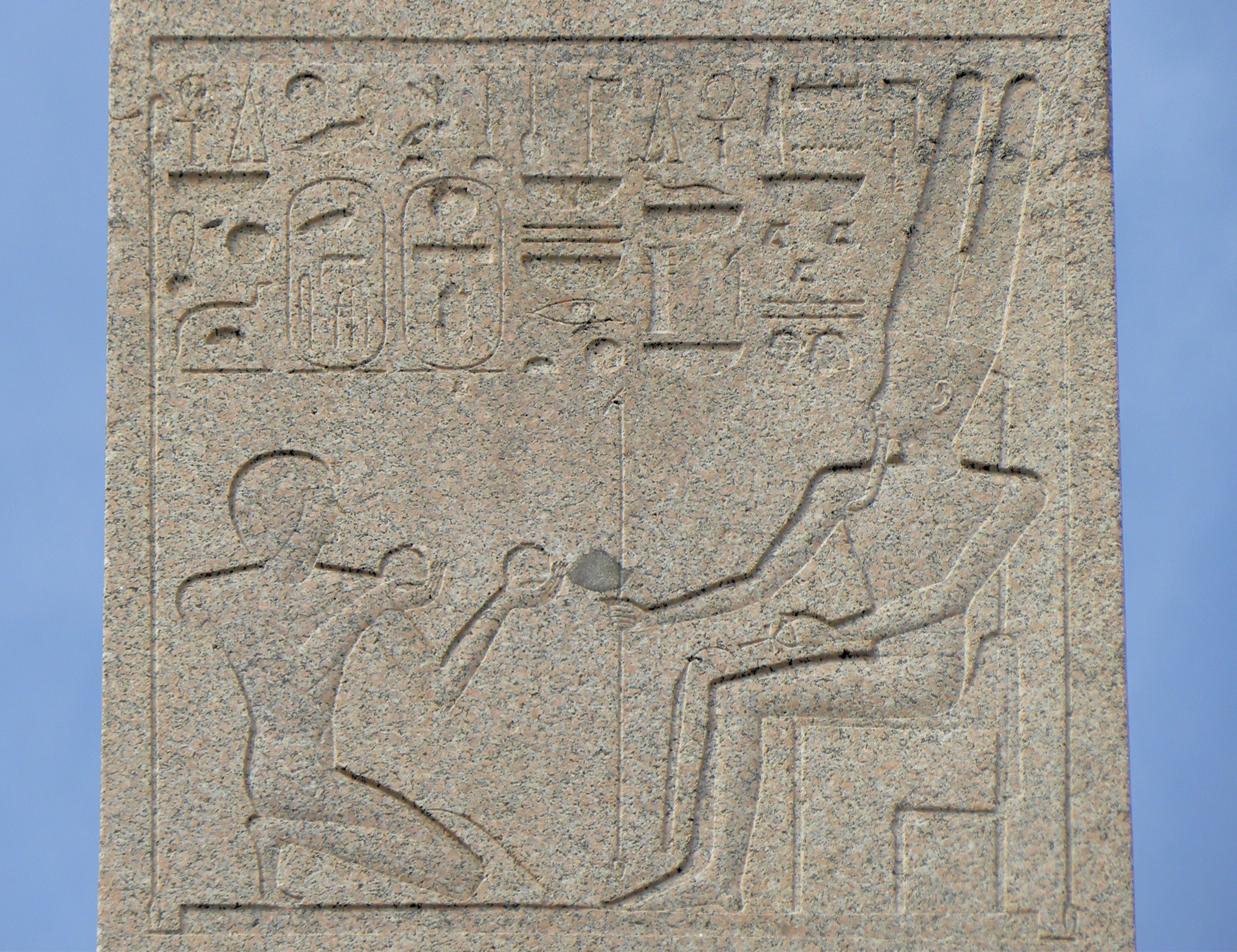
Detail of the Obelisk of Thutmose III showing Thutmose III giving offerings to Amun, currently located at the Hippodrome of Constantinople in Istanbul, Turkey

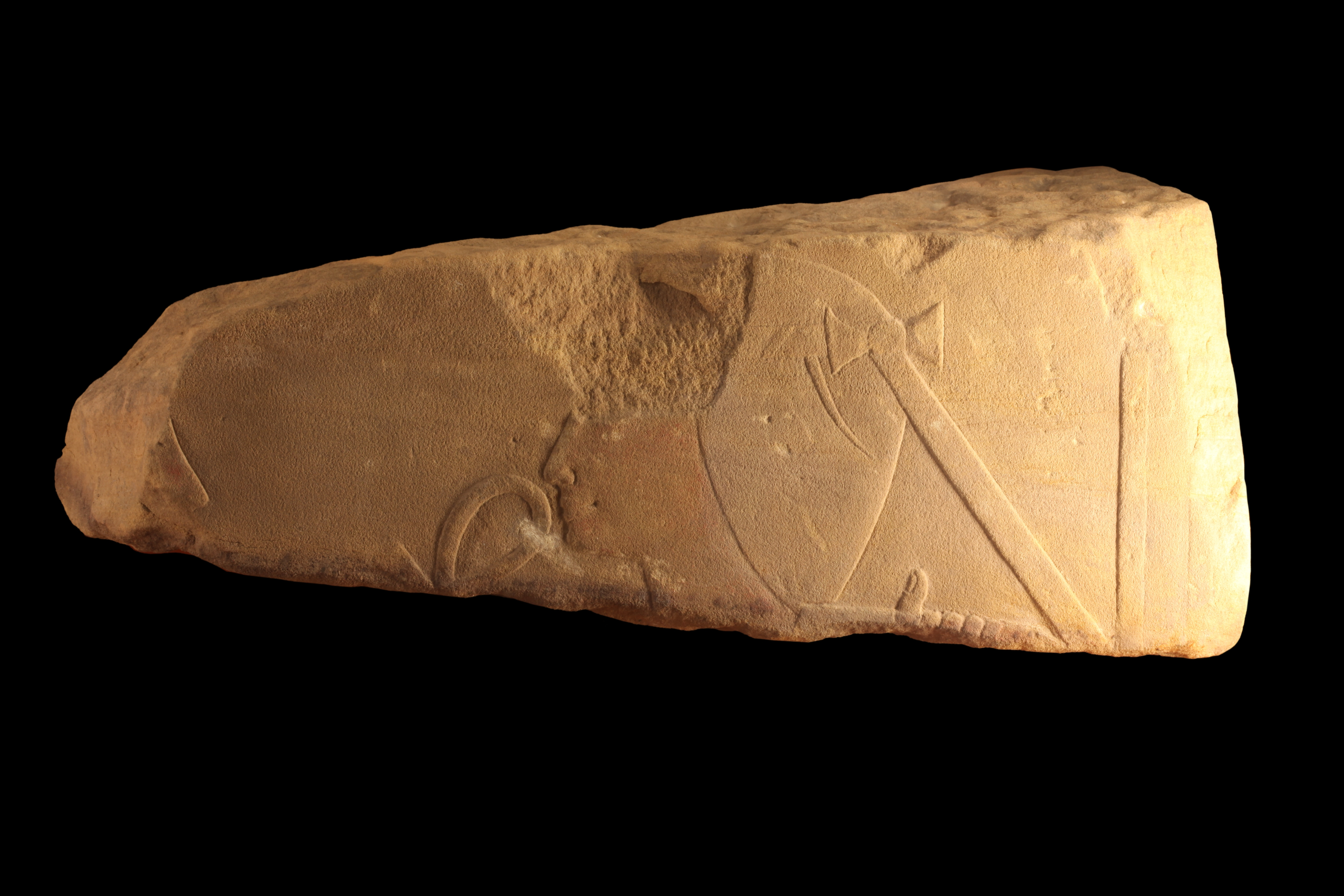
Fragment of a pillar in bas-relief: Thutmose III receiving the breath of life from Amun

== See also ==
- Cleopatra's Needles
- History of ancient Egypt
- Eighteenth Dynasty of Egypt family tree
