= Stela of Queen Tetisheri =

Stela of Tetisheri
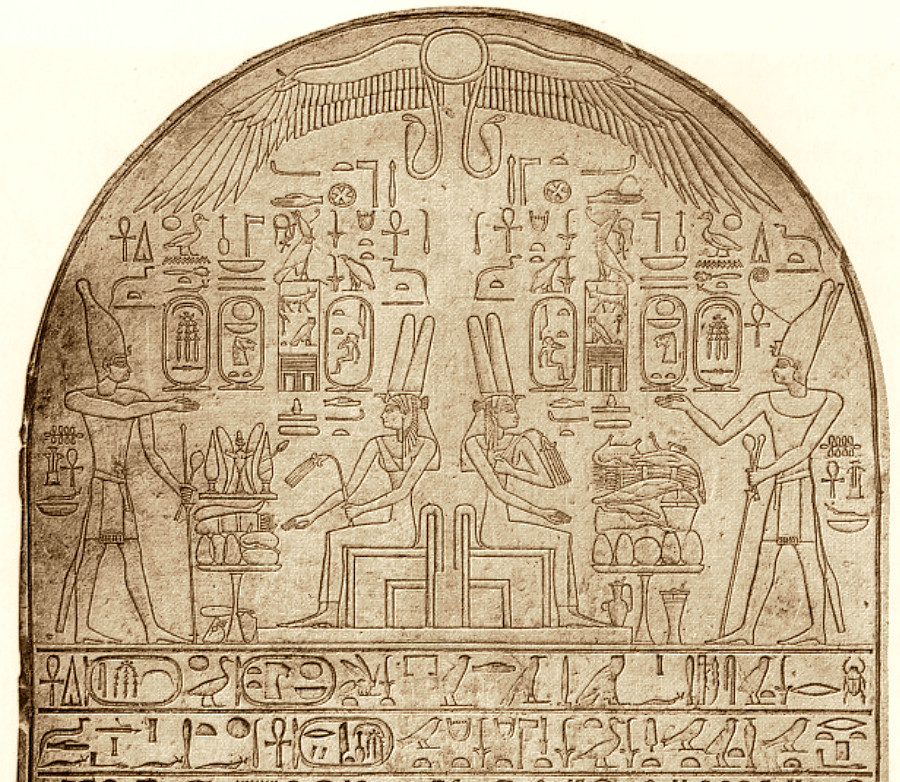
- Lunette of the stela of Tetisheri
- Material: Limestone
- Writing: Ancient Egyptian hieroglyphs
- Created: Late 16th century BCE
- Discovered: 1902
- Present location: Cairo Museum
- Identification: CG 34002

The Stela of Tetisheri is a limestone donation stele erected by Pharaoh Ahmose I, founder of the Eighteenth Dynasty of Egypt. It sits in the construction of his mortuary complex that included a cenotaph to his grandmother Queen Tetisheri, Senakhtenre's Great Royal Wife and grandmother of both Ahmose and his Principal Wife, Ahmose-Nefertari.

The stele was excavated in Ahmose's cult center at Abydos, found in 1902, in two pieces. A twin scene in the upper lunette shows king Ahmose presenting offering tables to seated Tetisheri (whose name is within some of the cartouches). Both the left and right scenes have variations of the offering tables, Tetisheri's arm poses, as well as Ahmose's. Besides Tetisheri's representation and nomen depictions in the lunette, her name appears in the hieroglyphic text below along with that of Nefertari who is referred as talking with Ahmose about making offerings and buildings to Tetisheri.

The multicolumned text in the lunette is the same for both left and right. The Cairo Museum guidebook presents the two cartouches, one serekh of Ahmose and a black-and-white photo of the stele. Ahmose's name is translated as:

Born (of the) moon (Moon-Born),
Lord of the strength of Ra,
Horus, victorious bull in Thebes.

("Aah.ms, Neb.pehty.ra, Hr.ka.nht.m.wast")
("Aah.ms-s, Neb.peht-t.ra, Hr.ka.nht.m.wast")
'Moon-Born(Aah-Mes-S), Lord Ra's (greatest) Strength(superlative), "Horus-Mightiest of Wast' -(=Uast)

== Bibliography ==
- Breasted, 1906. Ancient Records of Egypt, section: v. 2. The eighteen dynasty, p. 14-17. James Henry Breasted, 1906, University of Chicago Press.
- Kamrin, 2004. Ancient Egyptian Hieroglyphs: A Practical Guide, section: Stela of Tetisheri, Janice Kamrin, c 2004, Harry N. Abrams, Publisher, (section p. 128-129. {hardcover, ISBN 0-8109-4961-X}
- Lambelet. Orbis Terrae Aegiptiae, Museum Aegiptium, Illustrated Guide of the Egyptian Museum, section: Limestone stela of Ahmosis, Edouard Lambelet, c 1981, Lehnert & Landrock & Co. section, p. 76-77. (3-language text: English, French, German.) (No ISBN No.)
