= Charles Trick Currelly =

Canadian clergyman and archeologist

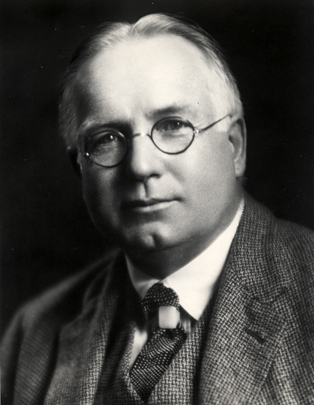
- Born: January 11, 1876; Exeter, Ontario, Canada
- Died: April 10, 1957 (aged 81); Baltimore, Maryland, United States
- Occupations: archeologist and museum director
- Known for: founding director of the Royal Ontario Museum

Charles Trick Currelly (January 11, 1876 – April 10, 1957) was a Canadian clergyman and archeologist, and the first director of the Royal Ontario Museum from 1914 to 1946.

== Early life ==
Charles Currelly was born on January 11, 1876, in Exeter, Ontario, the son of John Currelly and Mary Treble. An only child, he attended the local school in Exeter and was known to visit the shops of the blacksmith, tanner, and wheelwright in order to study how different materials were used. He was tutored by Reverend Jasper Wilson in Latin, who also taught him how to shoot. Currelly's high school years at the Harbord Collegiate Institute brought his family to Toronto. During this time, Currelly participated in art lessons and nature studies. After graduating in 1894, he attended the University of Toronto's Victoria College like his father and grandfather. At Victoria College, he took biology and earth science courses in addition to Asian history and Romance languages. He received his B.A. in 1898. After leaving university, Currelly spent two years serving as a lay missionary for the Methodist Church at Umatilla in northern Manitoba. During this time, he collected information on First Nations life in early Canada that was exhibited upon his return to Victoria College for postgraduate studies in the theological department. Currelly was awarded his master's degree in 1902.

== Archaeology ==
After completing his master's degree, in the spring of 1902, Currelly and his friend Ned Burwash, the son of Nathaniel Burwash, chancellor of Victoria University, went to England planning to study how Social gospel had filtered down to the working classes. However, this plan was disrupted when Currelly stopped at the British Museum to have some coins identified. After a little shawabti figure fell out of his pocket, Currelly was sent to the office of famous Egyptologist, Flinders Petrie who worked for the Egypt Exploration Fund. Petrie interviewed Currelly about his drawing skills and offered him an assistantship. Soon, Curelly was living in Petrie's home learning how to pack artifacts. Eventually, Currelly was responsible for a dig in Egypt where he discovered the cenotaph and tomb of Ahmose I. Curelly continued to work in Ehnasya, Lower Egypt, and in Sinai under Petrie until 1905, when Petrie left the Egypt Exploration Fund. In 1907, Currelly also left the Fund.

While in Egypt, Currelly discovered his talent and love of collecting and began to collect for people in Britain and Canada including Edmund Walker, the father of one of his school friends. After meeting with Walker in 1905, Currelly was appointed official collector for the University of Toronto and later was given the title of curator of Oriental archaeology. Currelly applied himself to the work of collecting, becoming more and more convinced that a good museum must be developed in Toronto.

== Royal Ontario Museum ==
In 1906, when Edmund Walker was chairing a commission on the future of the University of Toronto, it was recommended that a museum should be constructed to serve students and the public. Soon planning for the founding of a provincial museum started under Walker's watchful eye. In 1907, Currelly was made curator of the Royal Ontario Museum of Archaeology. During 1911, Currelly started to work in the basement of the first museum building which was still under construction. Finally, in 1914, Currelly became director of the Archaeology Museum. Throughout his life Currelly worked to advance the museum's interests and never stopped looking for acquisitions to augment the collections, leading them to grow enormously through the late 1910s and 1920s. When Currelly finally retired in 1946, the museum renamed the old Armour Court the Currelly Gallery.

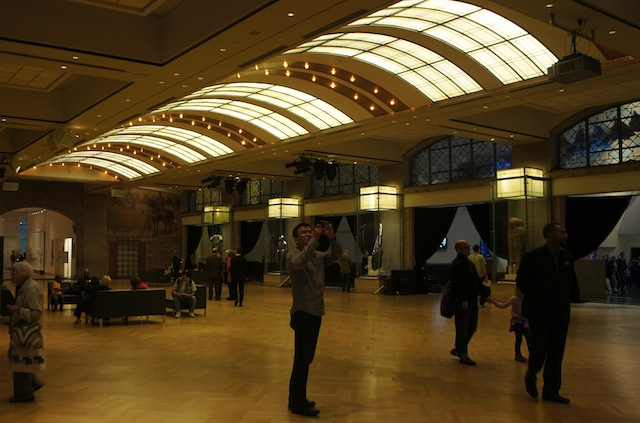
Currelly Gallery

== Later life and death ==
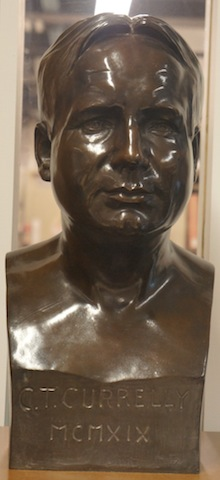
Currelly Bust

Before Currelly died, he wrote an autobiography entitled, I Brought the Ages Home. This book recounts his adventures, travels, and museum work. During his retirement Currelly lived near Port Hope, Ontario. While in Florida for a winter vacation, Curelly fell ill and was taken to the Johns Hopkins Hospital in Baltimore. The 81-year-old Currelly died on April 10, 1957, at the hospital where he had been receiving treatment since December. On October 7, 1957, an exhibition was held at the museum to commemorate him. The exhibition was marked by the unveiling of a bronze bust of Currelly which was cast in 1957 by the Vandevoorde Art Foundry of Montreal. The original sculpture was created in 1919 by Canadian artist Ulric Stonewall Jackson Dunbar. This bust and a bronze medallion of Currelly can still be viewed today in the museum's Sackler Reading Room.

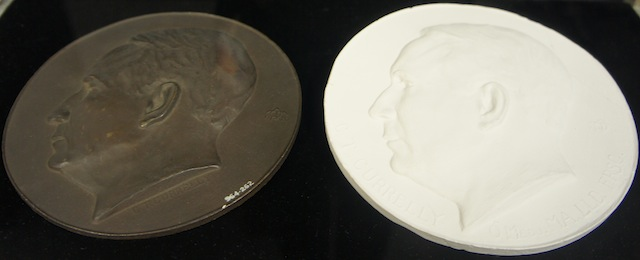
Currelly Bronze Profile and Plaster Cast

== Publications ==
- Researches in the Sinai. (with Petrie) New York: E.P. Dutton, 1906
- I Brought the Ages Home. Toronto: Ryerson Press, 1956

== See also ==
- Beardmore Relics, a supposed archaeological find, claimed by Currelly to be evidence of the ancient Norse in Ontario; today it is considered a hoax.
- Stela of Queen Tetisheri
