= Papyrus roll-tied =

Egyptian hieroglyph

Y1 Y1V
Papyrus Roll-
Tied

m(dj)3t
in hieroglyphs

The ancient Egyptian Papyrus roll-tied and sealed hieroglyph comes in the common horizontal, or a vertical form (shown in photo). It is juxtaposed against an open scroll, the Papyrus roll-open hieroglyph,

Y2 Aa29

, without the "visible ties". The sealed form can also have a seal impressed (in clay) on the tie, for security, or authentication, (see notarization). Both styles of the papyrus roll, "-tied" or "-open", are a logogram for "roll of papyrus", with a phonetic value of m(dj)3t.

Some artistic versions of the papyrus roll show the laminations, or grid-work, the cross-hatching of the papyrus fibers, for example on Thutmose III's cartouches.

== Gallery ==
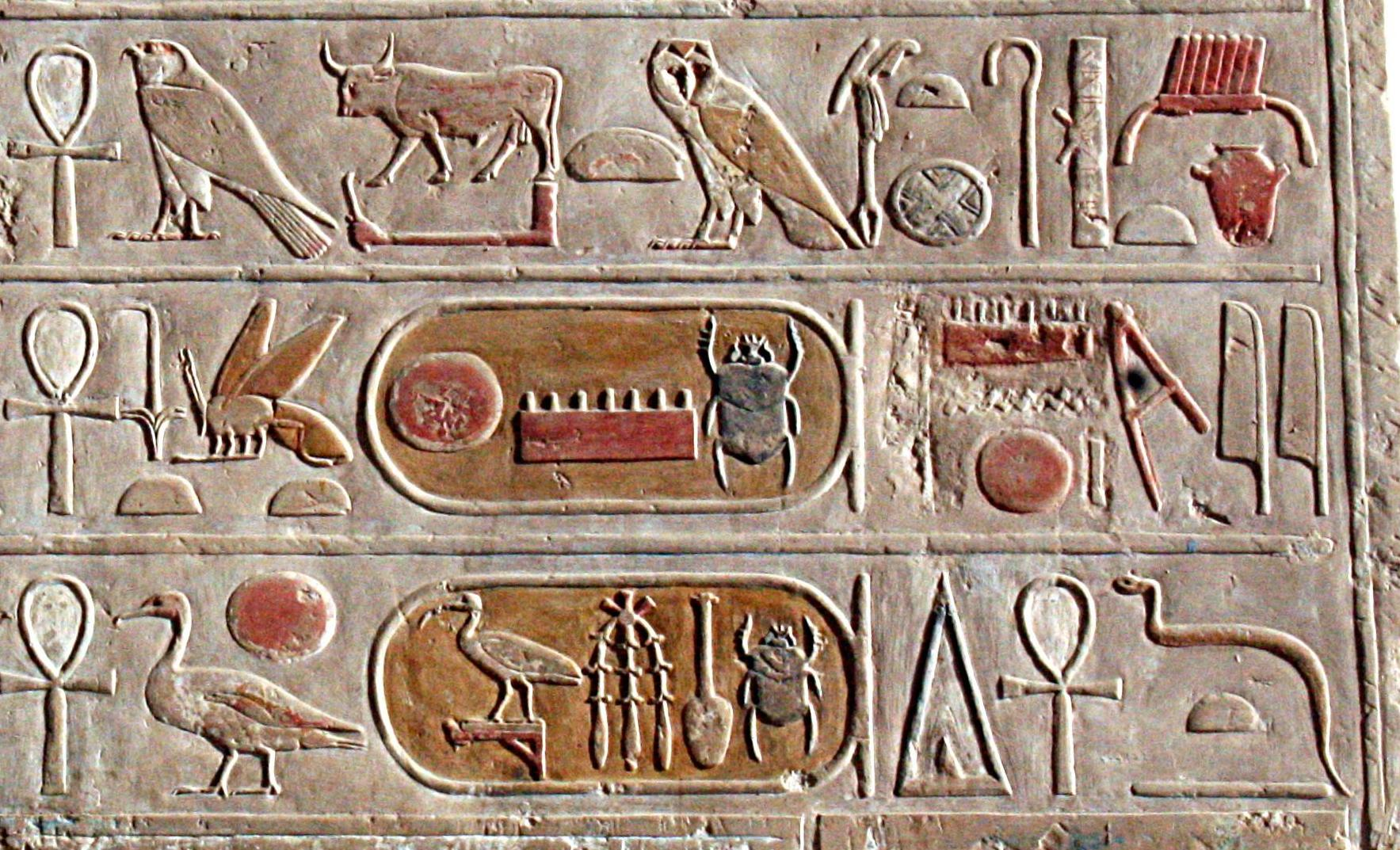
Painted Thutmosis III cartouches (temple relief), Deir el-Bahari.
(end of line 1, reads left-to-right)

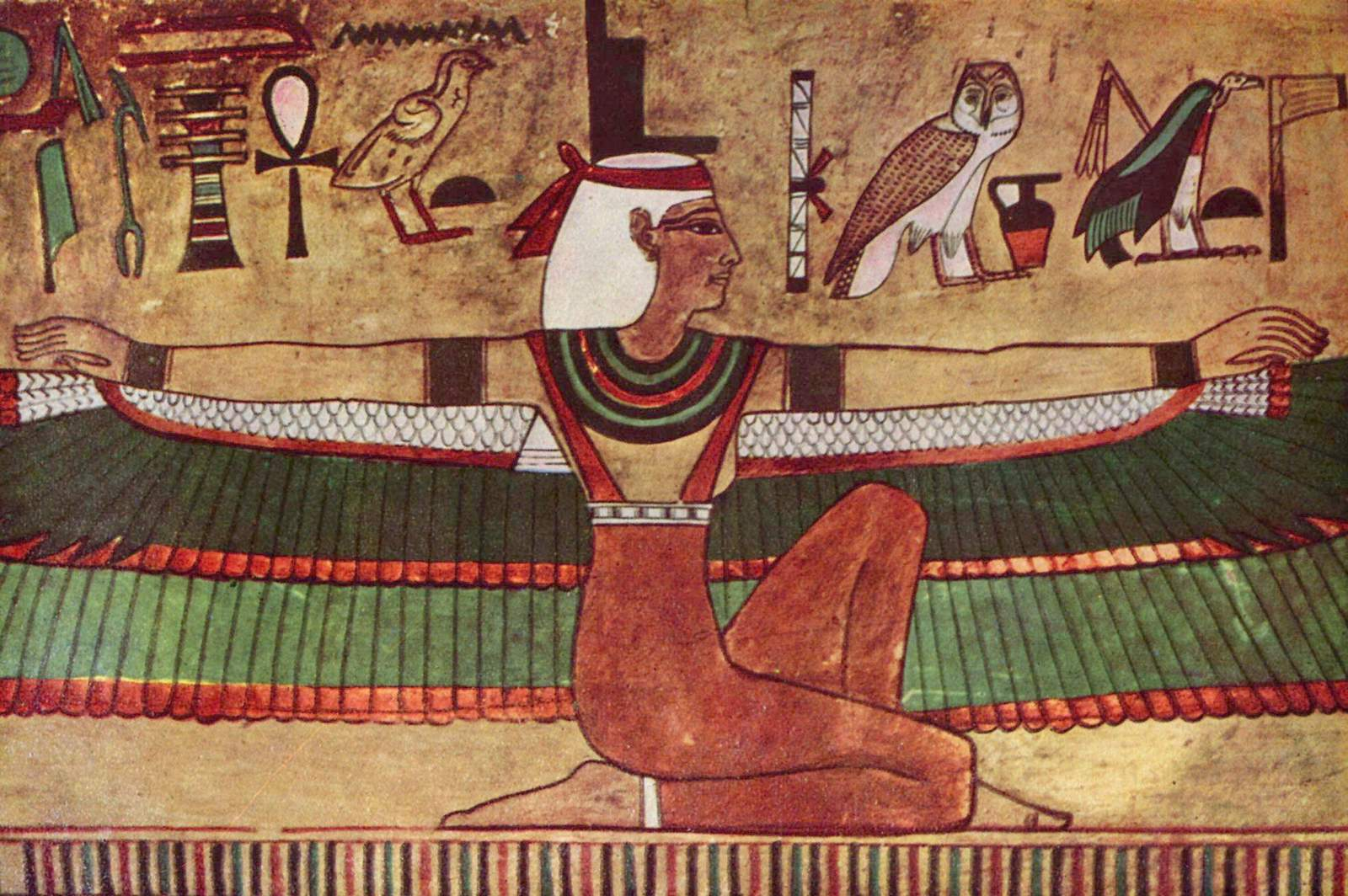
Finely painted Egyptian hieroglyph sample

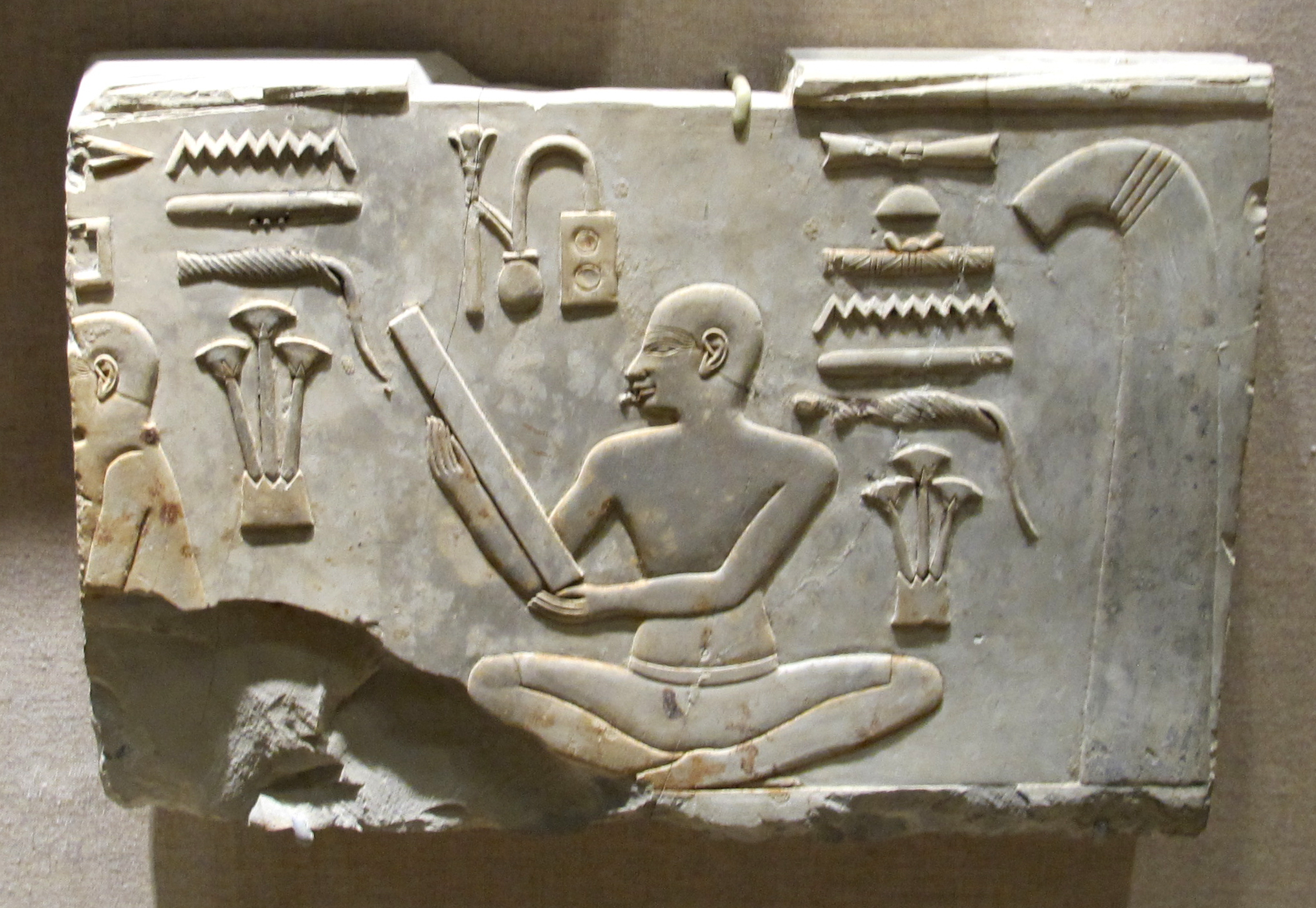
Finely detailed limestone relief example of tied papyrus hieroglyph

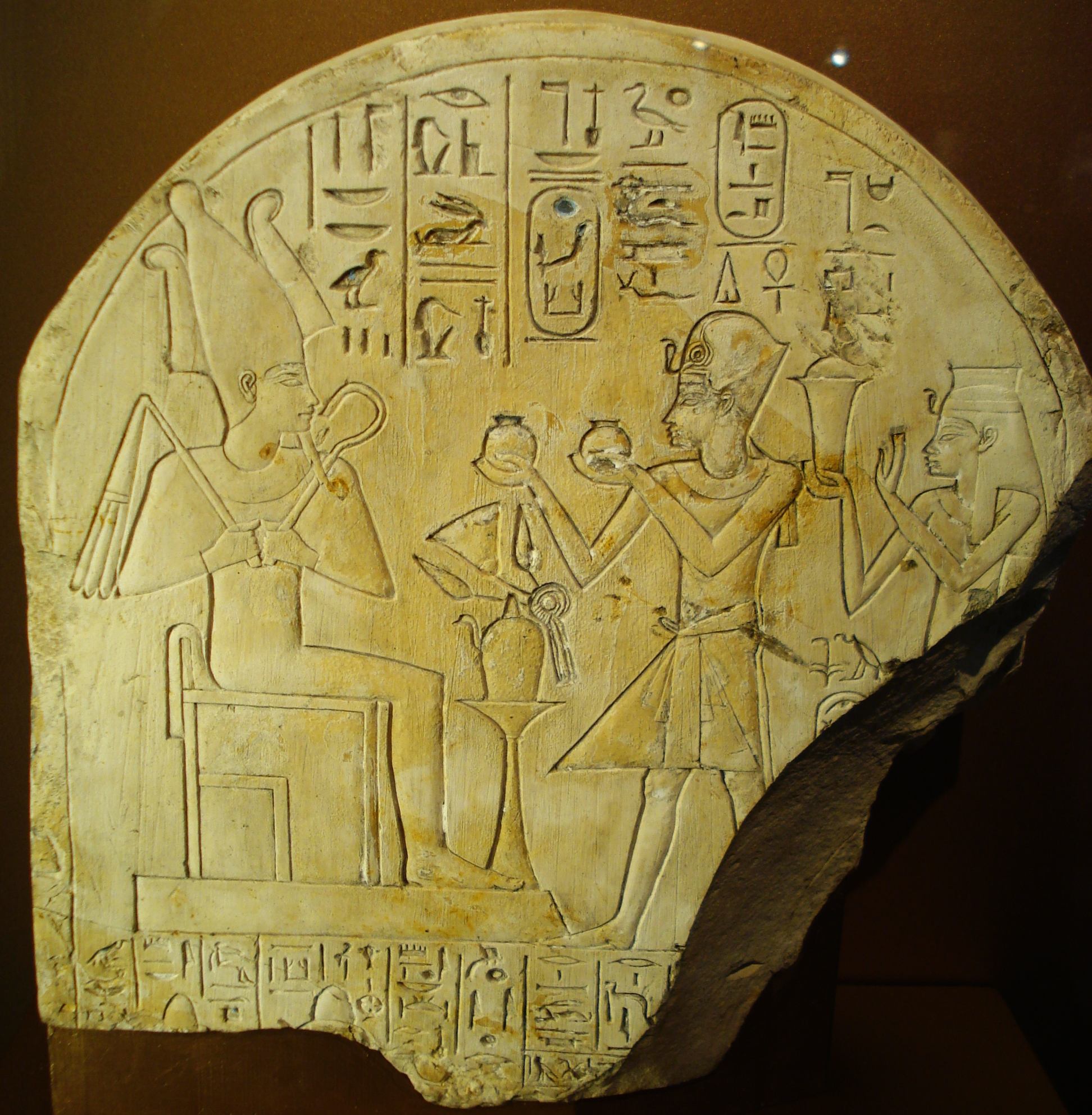
Partially missing lunette of a stela; Finely executed in shallow, incised-bas relief

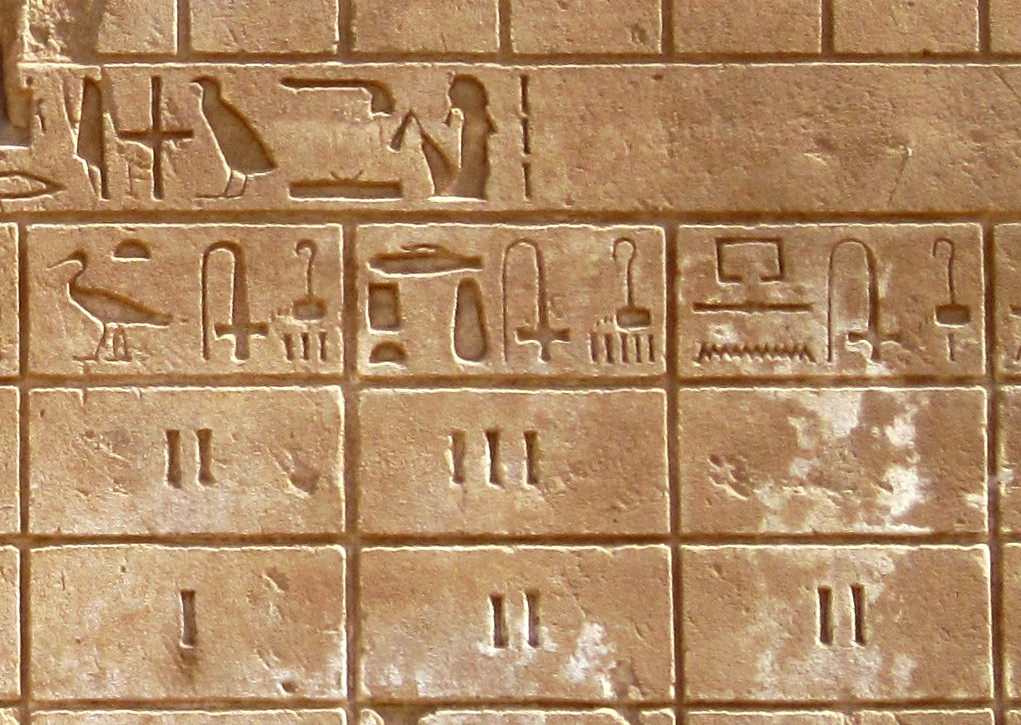
Example of tied papyrus roll, Karnak.
(in top row, "standard" horizontal form)
(Note also brazier (hieroglyph))

== See also ==
- Gardiner's sign list: Y
- List of Egyptian hieroglyphs
