= Scribe equipment (hieroglyph) =

Egyptian hieroglyph

Y3
Scribe
equipment
in hieroglyphs

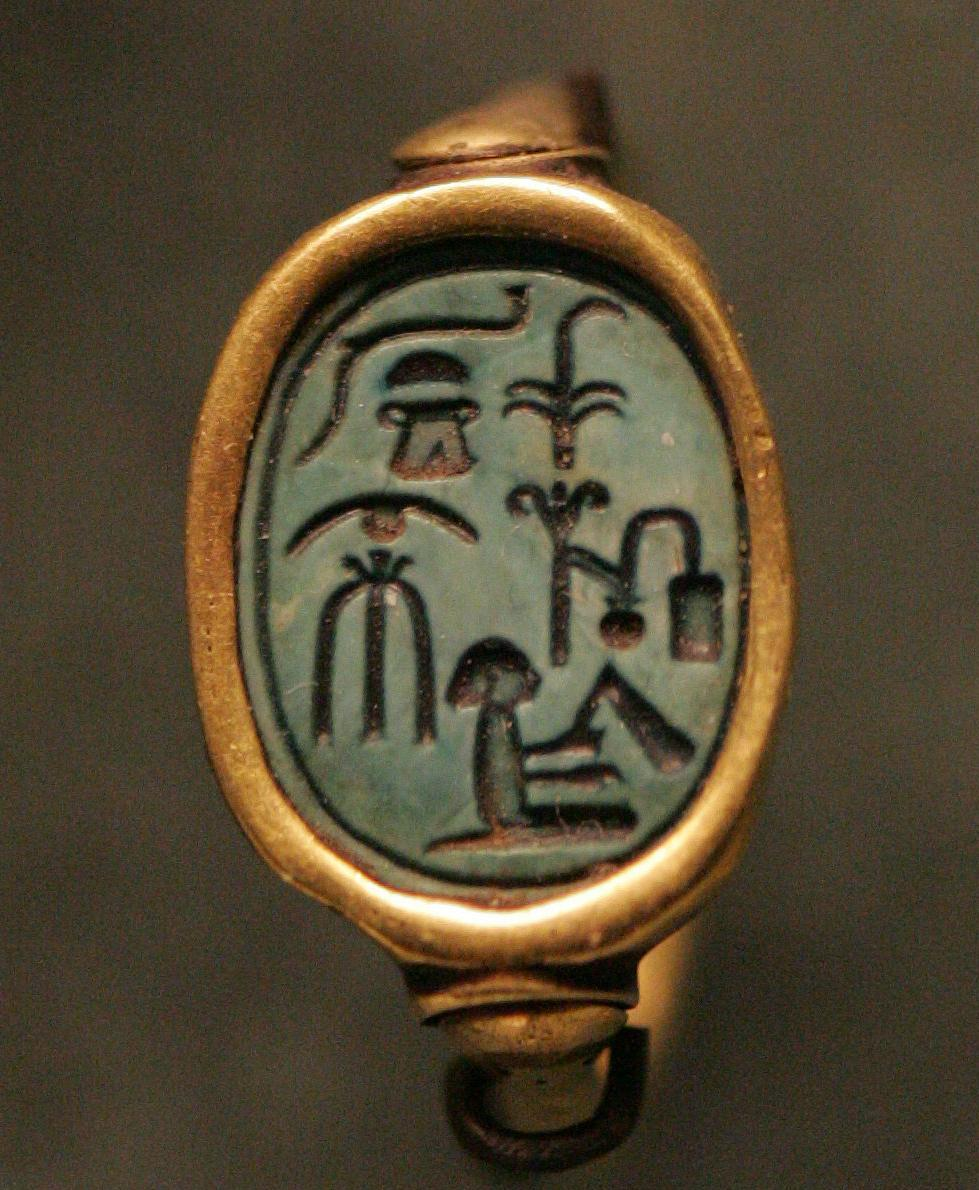
Seal ring. (Note also, hieroglyphs: bread bun (T), and jar stand (G). Starting with 'sedge'-("king"), Column 2-(on right): "(The) King's Scribe", Column 1-(left): "Overseer of the Harem, AhMose". the central figure: "seated man with flail", is a determinative for "(seated)-Man-noble".) (i.e. "Ah-Mes, (The)-Noble Man")

The ancient Egyptian Scribe equipment hieroglyph 𓏞 (Gardiner no. Y3), or its reversed form 𓏟 (Gardiner no. Y4), portrays the equipment of the scribe. Numerous scribes used the hieroglyph in stating their name, either on papyrus documents, but especially on statuary or tomb reliefs.

The hieroglyph depicts the 3 major components of a scribe's equipment:

1. tube case – for holding writing-reeds
2. leather bag – for holding colored inks (the canonical colors, black and red, mixed with water and gum)
3. wood scribal palette – with mixing pools; (not always made from wood)

== Language usage ==
The scribe equipment hieroglyph is often used as a determinative for items relating to writing or the scribe. Combined with the determinative for person 𓀀 (Gardiner no. A1), the hieroglyph is read as zẖꜣw, probably pronounced [θaçʀaw] or [θiçɫu] in Old Egyptian, and [saçʔaw] or [saçʔu] following the changes in pronunciation of z in Middle Egyptian and of ꜣ in Late Egyptian. By the Coptic stage of the language, this had lost its glottal stop and ending, reducing to ⲥⲁϧ [sax] (pl. ⲥϧⲟⲩⲓ [sxwi]).

Often the transliteration "sesh" appears, derived from the mistaken reading sš propagated in the dictionary and books of E. A. W. Budge. This reading is found as a phonetic complement using the signs for z and š, leading to the misunderstanding. However, Old Kingdom Egyptian lacked a distinct sign for the ẖ sound and the Coptic descendant shows that the original second consonant was indeed the palatalized fricative ẖ not the (alveolo-)palatal sibilant š, (š being the pool-lake-basin (hieroglyph) in the Egyptian language).

When used as the verb zẖꜣ, the hieroglyph has a variety of related meanings: to write, to draw, to make a design, to do into writing. As the noun zẖꜣ, it means: writing, inscription, written roll of papyrus, book, copy of a document, & handwriting. In plural usage: writings, letters, books, documents, archives, decrees, handwriting, the columns of a book, papers, title-deeds, registers, and literature.

== Gallery ==
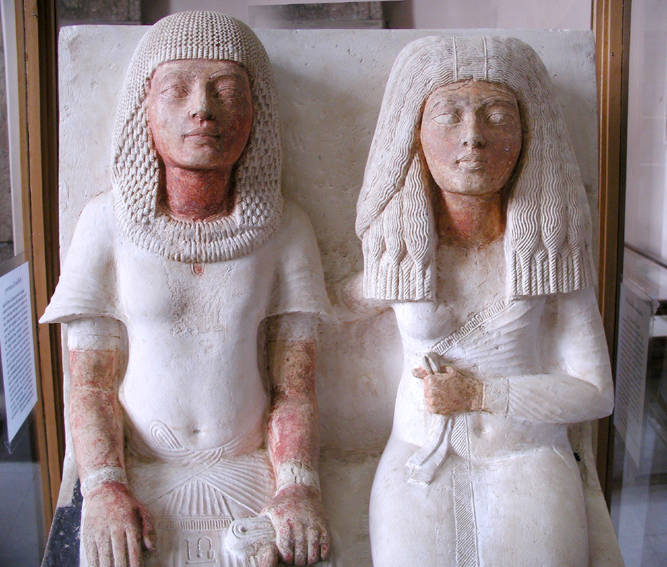
Meryre, a Scribe, and his wife
(hieroglyph on his pants, w/ his name)

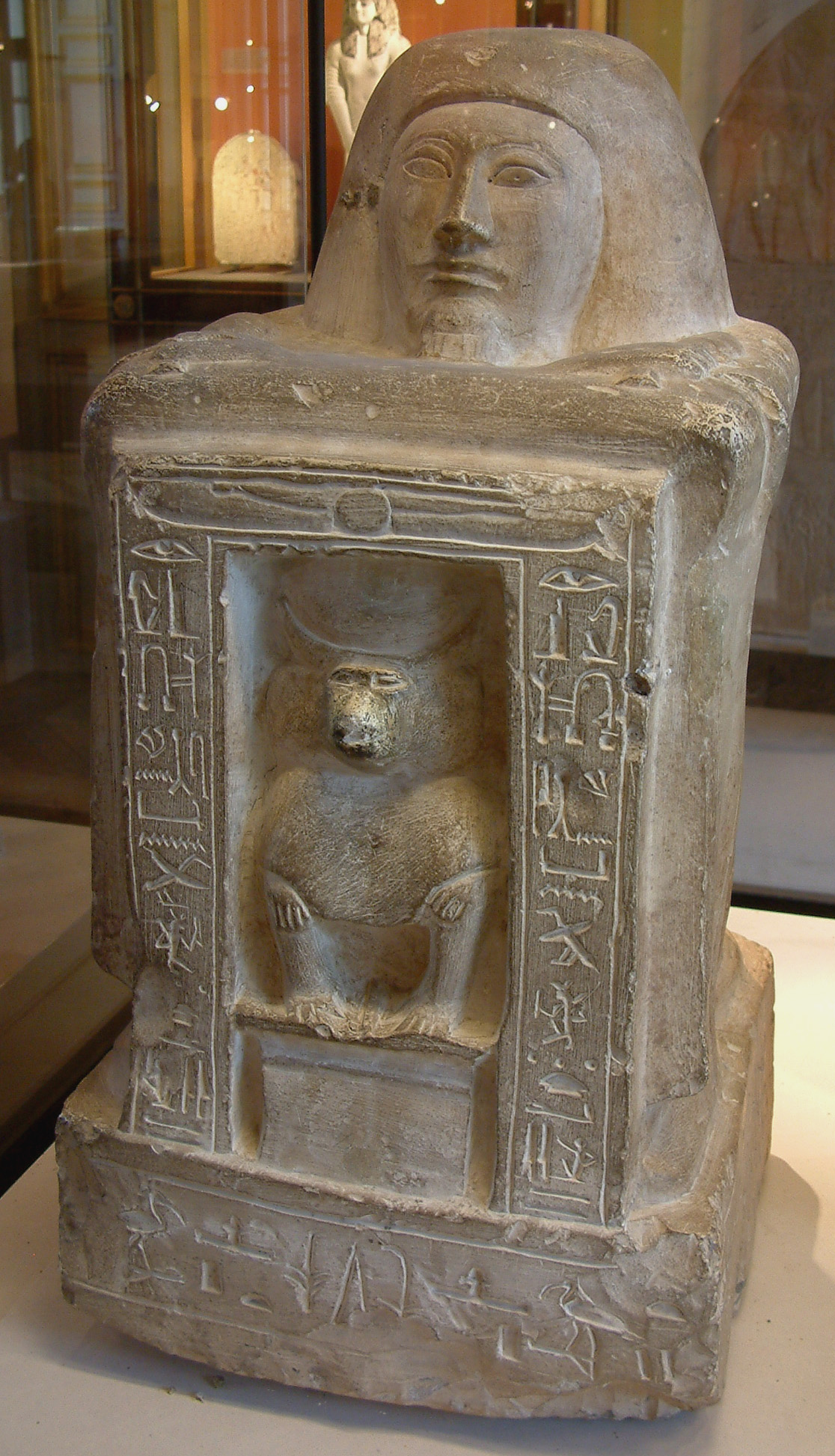
Block statue of a scribe
(with his name)

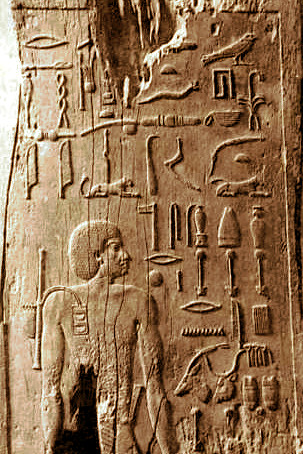
Wood panel of scribe Hesy-Ra
(1 of 7 panels, Old Kingdom)

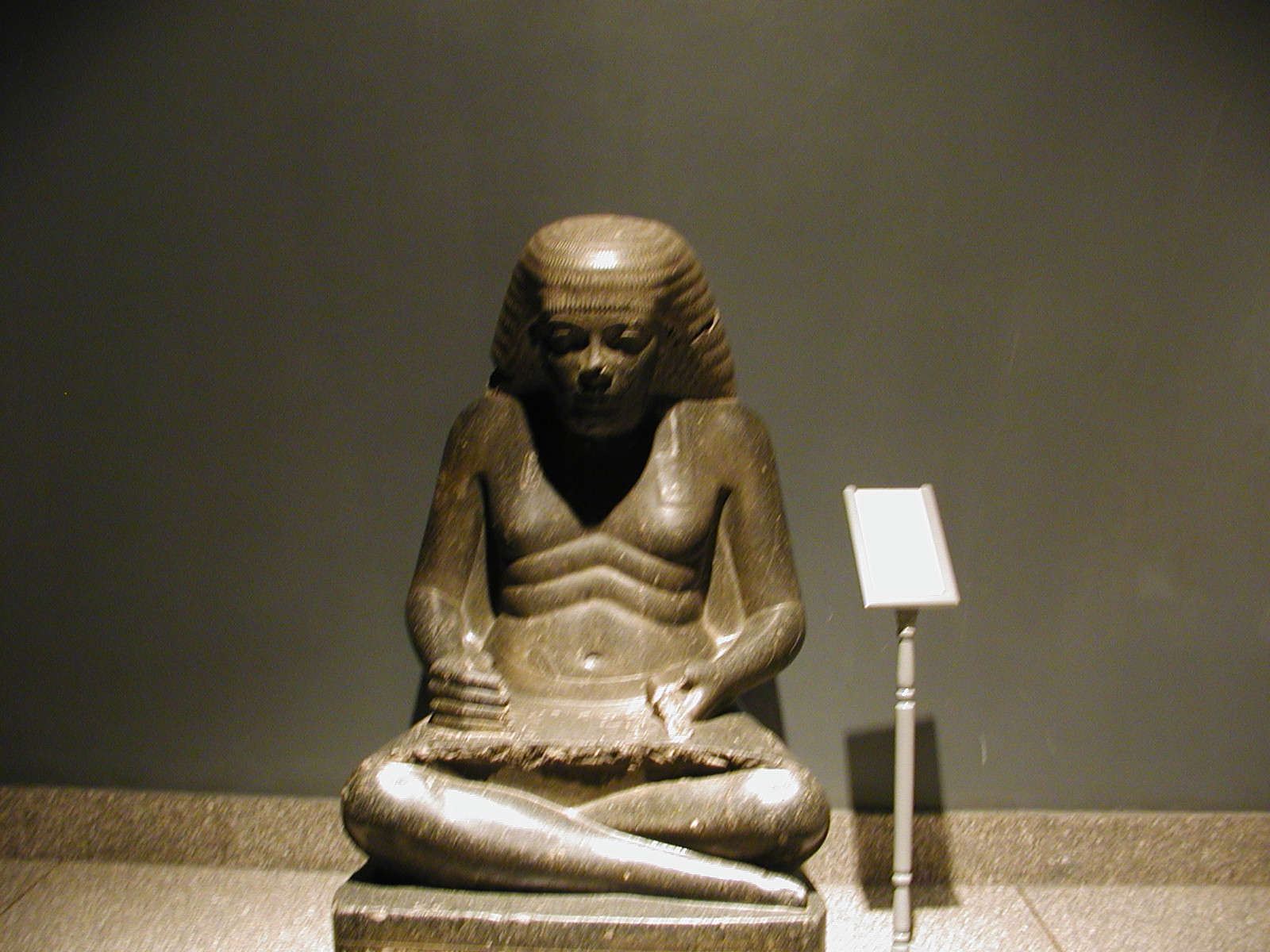
Seated scribe with part of scribe equipment on shoulders
(2-basin mixing palette over left shoulder)

=== Equipment, as an artifact ===
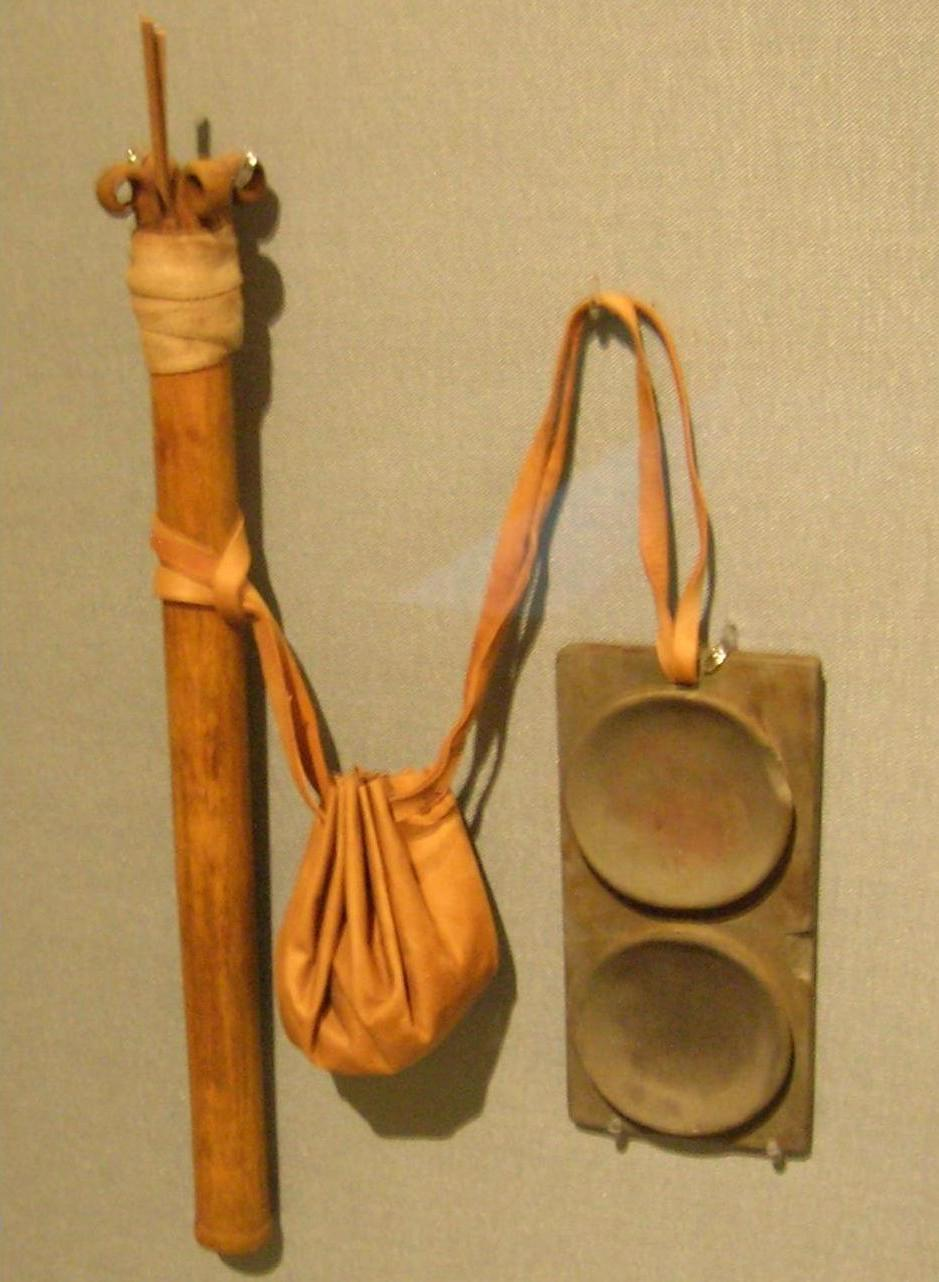
Artefact

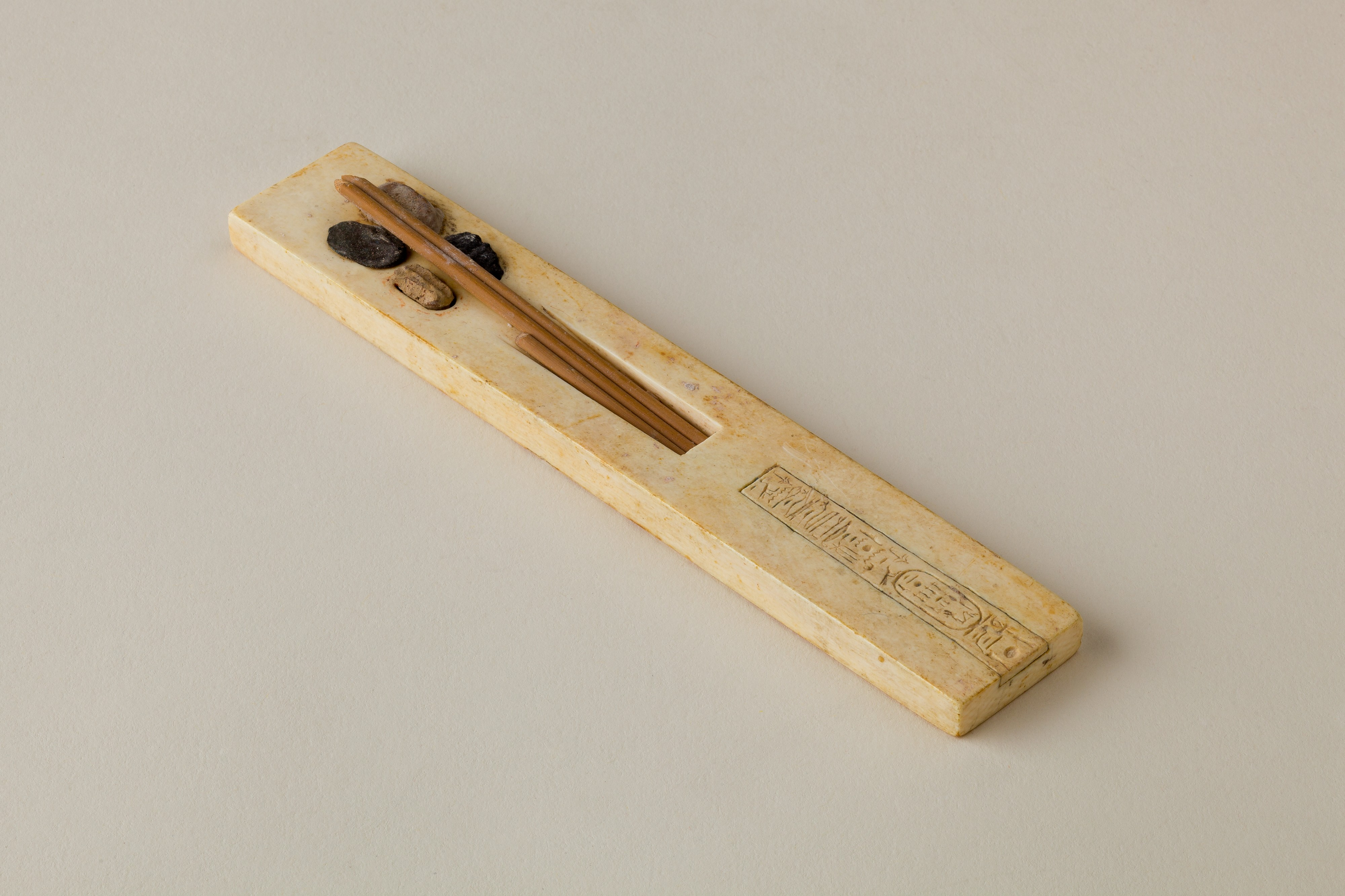
Writing palette and brushes of Princess Meketaten. Metropolitan Museum of Art

== See also ==
- Gardiner's Sign List#Y. Writings, Games, and Music
- List of Egyptian hieroglyphs
