= Beardmore Relics =

Cache of Viking artifacts allegedly discovered in Ontario, Canada

A silhouette of the Beardmore Relics

The Beardmore Relics are a cache of Viking Age artifacts, said to have been unearthed near Beardmore, Ontario, Canada in the 1930s. The cache consists of a Viking Age sword, an axe head, and a bar of undetermined use (possibly a part of a shield).

It has been claimed that the relics are proof of early Norse occupation of northern Ontario. While the authenticity of the fragments is not generally disputed, their "discovery" in situ in Ontario is considered to be a hoax. In the 1930s, the Royal Ontario Museum (ROM) purchased the relics from the man who supposedly unearthed them. For about twenty years they were prominently displayed by the museum; however, the museum was forced to pull the relics from display following a public enquiry in about 1956–1957. About this time, the son of the supposed discoverer admitted that his father had planted the relics. The provincial museum re-introduced the relics to public display in the 1990s.

== Supposed discovery ==
On 3 December 1936, James Edward Dodd, an amateur prospector and CNR trainman from Port Arthur, Ontario, sold a cache of iron fragments to Charles Trick Currelly, curator of the Royal Ontario Museum (ROM) for a price of $500 CAD. The cache consisted of a broken sword, an axehead, and a bar of unknown use. (Note: Logan described the find as "a sword, broken in two, an axehead, part of a horse rattle, and three unidentifiable fragments.") Dodd claimed that he had unearthed the fragments while prospecting for gold, southwest of Beardmore, Ontario, on 24 May 1931.

According to one version of events, Dodd took the fragments home, thinking they were Indian relics. For a while he kept them in his woodshed, until word of his discovery reached Currelly in Toronto. Currelly accepted Dodd's account, examined the fragments, and was convinced of their authenticity. He sent photographs of them to experts in Europe, who confirmed that they were genuine Norse artifacts. After his purchase of the fragments, Currelly had them displayed in the ROM. Around this time, James Watson Curran, editor of The Sault Ste. Marie Star, stated that the find was proof of a Norse burial in the region. Curran lectured widely on the theme "A Norseman died in Ontario nine hundred years ago" and published a book on the subject.

== Scepticism ==
Immediately after the Royal Ontario Museum's purchase of the "relics", Canadian archaeologists and others were dismayed at the museum's endorsement of the fragments, noting discrepancies in Dodd's statements, as well of those of his friends and enemies. Dodd had altered his account several times. John Robert Colombo wrote that “Archaeologists accused Dodd of fraud, suggesting he had purchased the artifacts from an immigrant from Norway and then ‘salted’ them for later ‘discovery’. Amid considerable controversy, the Royal Ontario Museum withdrew the artifacts from public display, and for more than thirty years would routinely refuse permission to reproduce photographs of the relics.” (Note: Salting an object is to place or 'plant' it somewhere for it to be 'found' or 'discovered'.)

In 1956 or 1957 Walter Dodd, son of James Edward Dodd, submitted a sworn statement that his father had found the relics in the basement of a house at 33 Machar Street, Port Arthur; that he saw his father plant the relics at the site of the supposed discovery; and that his earlier statement had been made "under pressure" from his father. Until this point the Royal Ontario Museum had defended the authenticity of the relics and of their supposed discovery. Amid considerable controversy, and following a public enquiry, the museum withdrew the relics from display.

According to American anthropologist Edmund Carpenter, during the twenty-five years between the supposed discovery and the son's admission, successive museum directors and staff members knew much of the 'true' history of the relics. Carpenter stated that the staff knew the collection where the fragments and even knew the name of the ship on which they reached Canada. Carpenter cited this case as an example of his 1961 concept of "identification with institutional power." According to historian F. Donald Logan, the fragments appear to have been imported from Scandinavia in about 1923. They ended up in the Port Arthur area, which had a sizable Norwegian population. It is reported that for more than 30 years museum curators refused to allow photographs to be taken of the fragments and that in the 1990s the museum re-introduced the relics to public display.

== Sources ==
Footnotes

References

- Colombo, John Robert (1988). Mysterious Canada: Strange Sights, Extraordinary Events, and Peculiar Places. Toronto: Doubleday Canada. ISBN 0-385-25150-5.
- Colombo, John Robert (1999). Mysteries of Ontario (Illustrated ed.). Dundurn Press. ISBN 978-0-88882-205-5.
- Holman, Katherine (2009). The A to Z of the Vikings. Lanham: Scarecrow Press. ISBN 978-0-8108-6329-3.
- Logan, F. Donald (2003). The Vikings in History (2nd ed.). London & New York: Routledge. ISBN 0-203-72738-X.
- Mowat, Farley (1990). Westviking: The Ancient Norse in Greenland and North America. Toronto: McClelland & Stewart. ISBN 0-7710-6692-9.
