= Decree of Nectanebo I =

C. 380 BC Egyptian temple payment decree

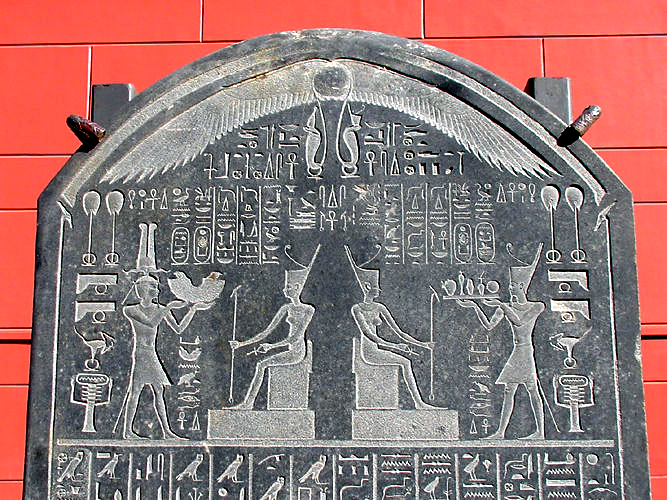
Stele, with Decree of Nectanebo I. (Lunette of the top 1/3 of stele.)

The Decree of Nectanebo I was issued by Pharaoh Nectanebo I of the 30th Dynasty of Ancient Egypt. It regards payments to the local temple, and was recorded on two steles.

The location of the temple was near the Canopic branch of the Nile River, in the eastern Nile Delta of Lower Egypt. Accordingly, steles were erected at two locations as statements to curry political favor with the priesthood, and possibly the populace.

The twin steles are identical in 14 columns of hieroglyphs except in column 13, where the stele's location is named. The steles were erected shortly after Nectanebo came to power, ca 380 BC.

== Stele description ==
The stele's purpose was to use a 10 percent portion of the waterway-use tax (unspecified import tax) for the services of the priests in charge of the temples of the goddess Neith.

A finely engraved lunette adorns the upper third of the steles; the engravings and hieroglyphs are all incised in moderate sunken bas relief. The lunette focuses on two versions of the goddess Neith, being offered a food offering on the right, and a usekh collar on the left, by the presenter Nectanebo.

== History of the steles ==
The first stele, the Stele of Naukratis was uncovered at Naukratis in 1899, and was subsequently translated.

Only recently, its twin stele was recovered from the underwater site of Heracleion, an ancient Egyptian city that was discovered by archaeologists in 2000. Heracleion was also located on the Canopic branch of the Nile.

Herakleion is also mentioned on the steles.

== Bibliography ==
M. Lichtheim, "The Naucratis Stela Once Again," in J. H. Johnson and E. F. Wente (eds.), Studies in Honor of George R. Hughes, January 12, 1977 (Chicago 1976), 139-47. https://isac.uchicago.edu/research/publications/saoc/saoc-39-studies-honor-george-r-hughes-january-12-1977

J. Yoyotte, "An Extraordinary Pair of Twins: The Steles of the Pharaoh Nektanebo I," in F. Goddio and M. Clauss (eds.), Egypt's Sunken Treasures (Munich 2006), 316-23.

S. v Bomhard,"The Decree of Saïs. Underwater Archaeology in the Canopic Region in Egypt". Oxford Center for Maritime Archaeology 7, (Oxford 2013).
