= Ancient Egyptian Hieroglyphs: A Practical Guide =

Book by Janice Kamrin

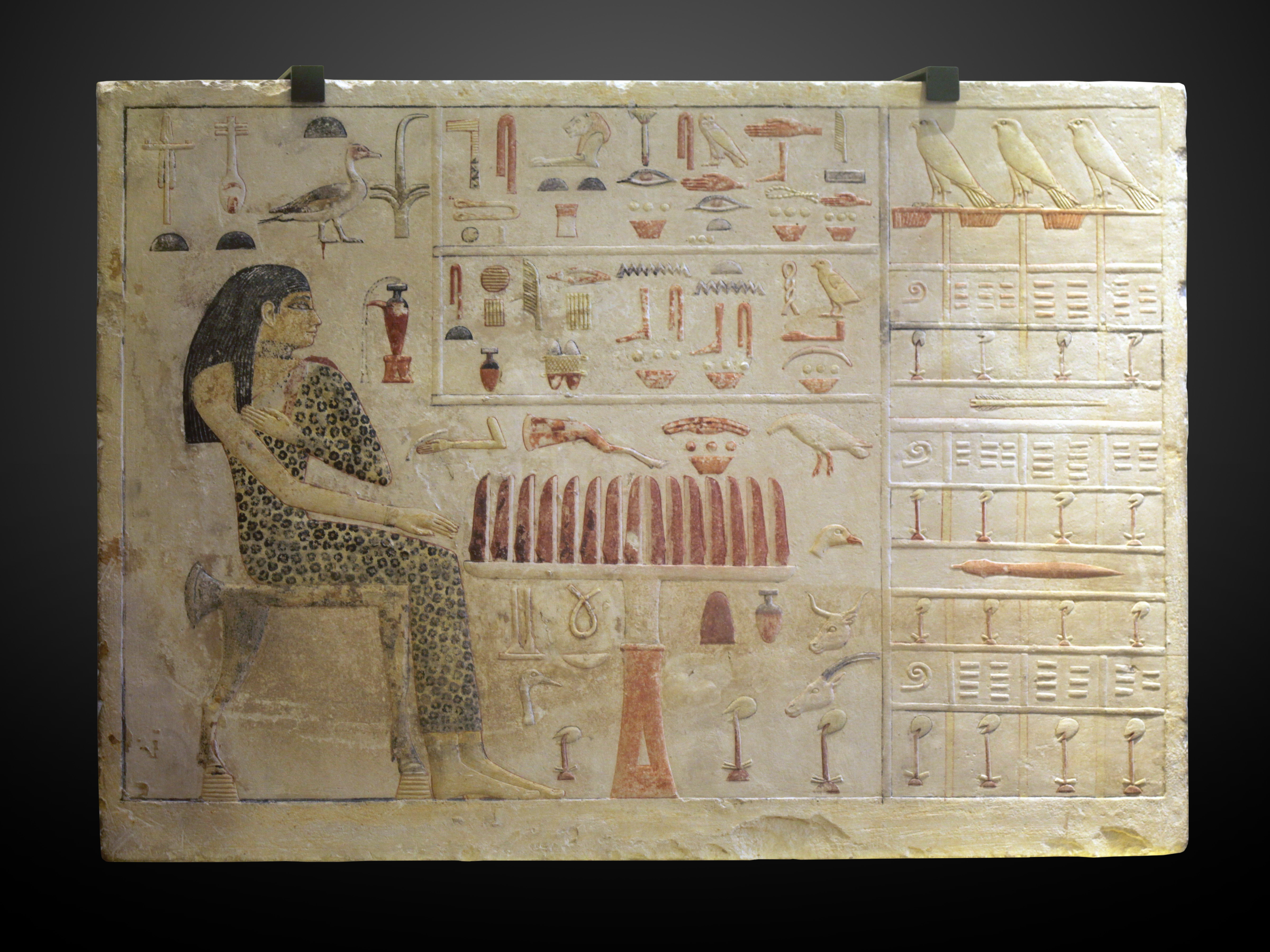
Slab stela of Nefer-t-Ab-t.

Ancient Egyptian Hieroglyphs: A Practical Guide is one of the modern primers on the Egyptian language and hieroglyphs, from the late 20th to early 21st century.

The text is a color-coded guide to individual Ancient Egyptian objects or writings, and their modern translations. The book is by Janice Kamrin, c. 2004; she received a Ph.D. in Egyptian archaeology from the University of Pennsylvania, has worked with Zahi Hawass, and has taught at the American University in Cairo.

== Summary of layout ==
The text uses pictures and graphics, divided into 46 Lessons-(40 photos, some color-coded, and 37 graphics).

The final two topics, Lessons 45, 46 are The Autobiography of Harkhuf in three parts, and a section of the famous Battle of Kadesh.

The book contains five appendices, including a sign list referring to Gardiner's Sign List, and ascribing each sign's name; not all 700 names of Gardiner's list are standardized, nor is every sign completely understood as to meaning. Also, an 'answer key' to the exercises, and a short dictionary: "Word List (Egyptian to English)".

== Objects transliterated ==
Many of the objects from the book are located in the Egyptian Museum. Some of the notable items transliterated are:

1. The Slab stela of Nefer-t-Ab-t(Nefertiabet).
2. The Slab stela of Wepemnefert.
3. Brief translation from Narmer Palette.
4. 2-3 paragraphs from the Battle of Kadesh.
5. Entrance to the Tomb Chapel of Tomb of two Brothers-(with Ancient Egyptian offering formula).
6. A detailed, 4-column false door.
7. Naos (shrine) of Ptahmes-(2 columns, 1 horizontal text, and writing on Ptahmes' body in Naos-center).
8. "Stela of Tetisheri"
9. Old Kingdom, 4th Dynasty dual painted seated statues of "Rahotep, and wife Nefer-t".
10. 1 of the 7 wood panels of Hesy-Ra, 3rd Dynasty.
11. Canopic chest of Tutankhamun.

== See also ==
- Hesy-Ra–(Example from one of his wooden panels)
