= Papyrus roll-open =

Egyptian hieroglyph

Y2 Aa29
Papyrus Roll-
Open

m(dj)3t
in hieroglyphs

The ancient Egyptian Papyrus roll-open hieroglyph comes in the common horizontal, or a vertical form. It is juxtaposed against a closed scroll, the Papyrus roll-tied hieroglyph, with the visible ties. Both styles of the papyrus roll, "-tied" or "-open", are a logogram for "roll of papyrus", with a phonetic value of m(dj)3t.

Some artistic versions of the papyrus roll show the laminations, or grid-work, the cross-hatching of the papyrus fibers, for example on Thutmose III's cartouches.

== Gallery ==
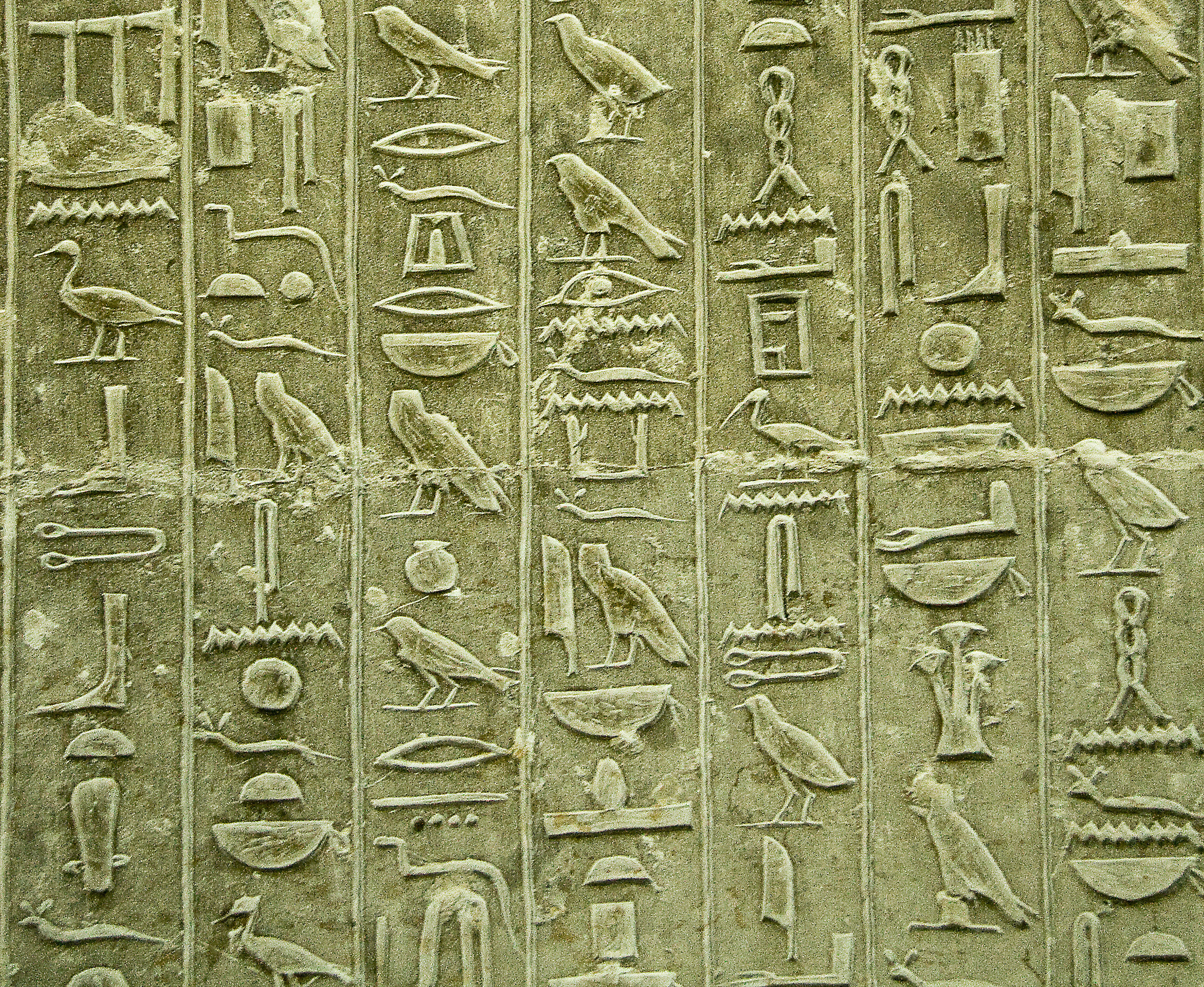
Mastaba tomb of Vizier Ankhamahor

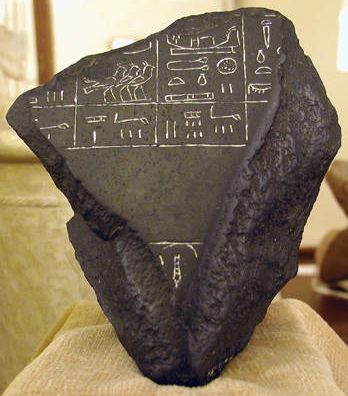
Untied version of papyrus roll from Palermo Stone fragment

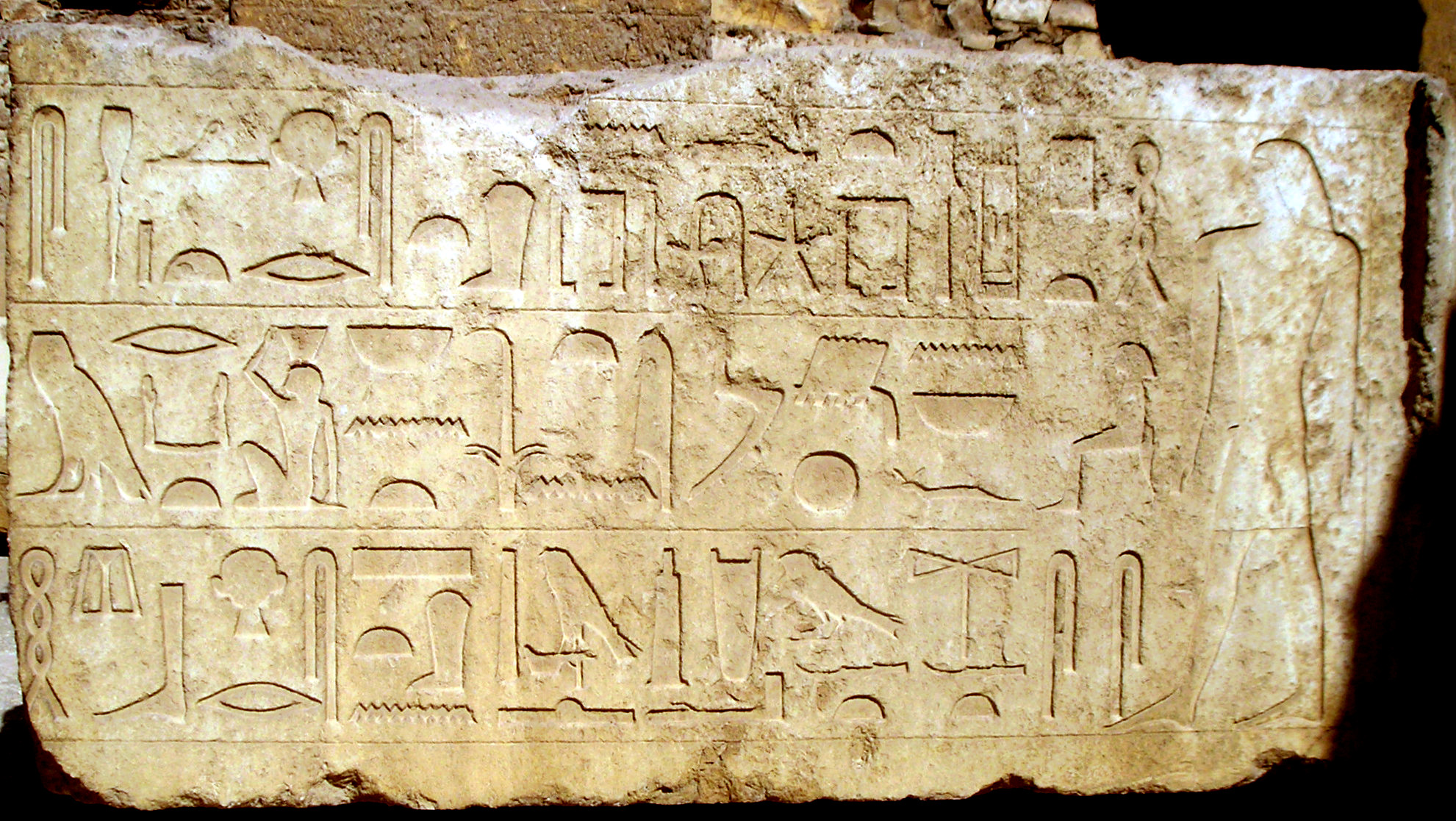
Relief from the mastaba of Ptahshepses

== See also ==
- Gardiner's sign list: Y
- List of Egyptian hieroglyphs
