= Sitdjehuti =

Ancient Egyptian queen consort

- Queen consort of Egypt
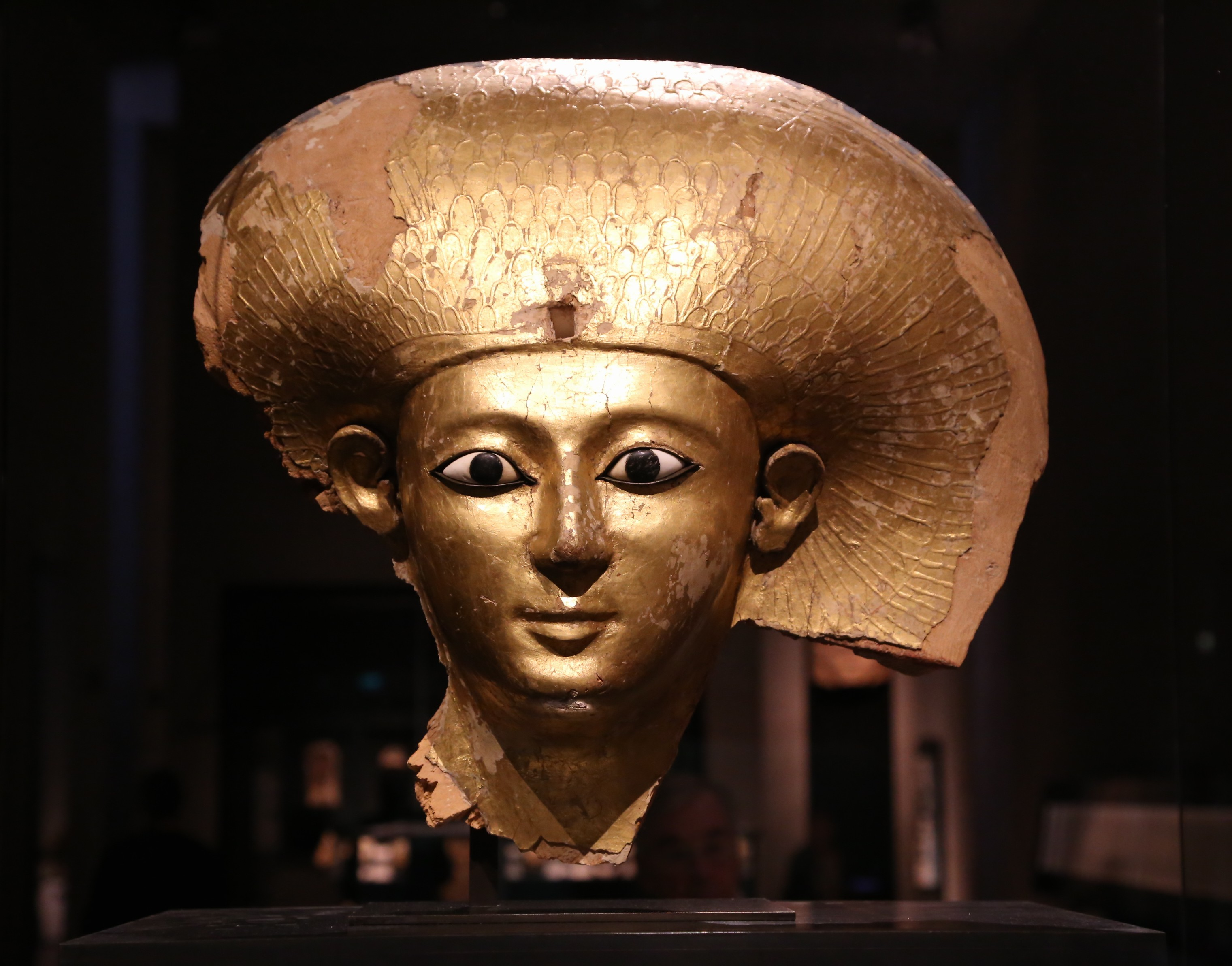
- Fragment of Sitdjehuti's coffin
- Spouse: Seqenenre Tao
- Issue: Ahmose
- Dynasty: 17th of Egypt
- Father: Senakhtenre?
- Mother: Tetisheri
- Religion: Ancient Egyptian religion

Sitdjehuti in hieroglyphs
< G26 Z4 G39 t >
Satdjehuti/Satibu
Sꜣt Ḏḥwty
Daughter of Thoth

Sitdjehuti/Satibu (died 1550/1500 BC, also Satdjehuti; "Daughter of Thoth") was a princess and queen of the late Seventeenth Dynasty of Egypt. She was a daughter of Pharaoh Senakhtenre Ahmose and Queen Tetisheri. She was the wife of her brother Seqenenre Tao and was the mother of Princess Ahmose.

== Life ==
On her sarcophagus, she is stated to be the daughter of Tetisheri. Her other name is given as Satibu.

It is assumed that Sitdjehuti was a daughter of Pharaoh Senakhtenre Ahmose and a sister to Pharaoh Seqenenre Tao and the queens Ahhotep and Ahmose Inhapy. She was married to her (half-)brother Seqenenre Tao and bore him a daughter, Ahmose.

== Titles ==
Sitdjehuti's titles include King's Wife, King's Sister, and King's Daughter.

King's Wife. She is mentioned on the mummy shroud of her daughter Ahmose, which was found in the Valley of the Queens (QV47). Ahmose is called the King's Daughter and King's Sister. This states that Ahmose was the daughter of King Seqenenre Tao and Sitdjehuti.

King's Daughter. Her mother appear on her coffin as Tetisheri, indicating that her father may have been Senakhtenre Ahmose. If so, she named her daughter after her father, princess Ahmose. It would also make her the sister of Ahhotep.

King's Sister. It is not confirmed who her king-brother was. Presumably it was her husband Seqenenre.

== Death ==
Sitdjehuty died during the reign of Amenhotep I (1545-1526BC, high chronology) or Thutmose I (1526-1513 BC, high chronology). As indicated by her linen, Ahmose-Nefertari donated the cloth for her burial. At that time Ahmose-Nefertari held the title King's Mother, referring to Amenhotep I. The style of her burial is early D18, and some features became common with Thutmose I onwards. She most likely died during the reign of Amenhotep I. She must have been a woman of relatively old age, having outlived Ahmose I and possibly Amenhotep I.

== Burial ==
Sitdjehuti's mummy was discovered around 1820, along with its coffin, golden mask, a heart scarab, and linens donated by her niece Queen Ahmose-Nefertari.

The linen is inscribed with the text:

Given in the favour of the god's wife, king's wife and king's mother Ahmose Nefertari may she live, so Satdjehuty.

The coffin lid is now held at the Staatliche Sammlung für Ägyptische Kunst, Munich, while the mummy mask is located in the British Museum (EA 29770).

- München ÄS 7163 + ÄS 7220 | A wooden rishi coffin of King’s Daughter Sat-Djehuty/Sat-Ibu, born to King’s Wife Teti.
