= Man-seated: arms in adoration =

Egyptian hieroglyph

A4
Seated Man
Arms Raised
in Adoration
in hieroglyphs

A30
Standing person
Arms raised
in Adoration
in hieroglyphs

The ancient Egyptian Dua (Man-seated: arms in adoration) hieroglyph is one of a series of language and visual hieroglyphs used from the earliest dynasties of Ancient Egypt, and that portrays men, women, ideology, and some occupations.

Used versions of the adoration hieroglyph are with men, women, and groups of individuals; also the adoration-type hieroglyph is shown in a standing pose, with upraised arms. The men and women hieroglyphs of both the men and women series, encompass a majority of the human traits, forms, emotions, etc.

== Use in priest-libationer hieroglyph ==
A6 A6 A6
Plural
3 (Libationer), Priests
in hieroglyphs

A major use of the seated-adoration hieroglyph would be as part of the Libationer-Priest (hieroglyph). Although the main man-seated, adoration hieroglyph is not used in the Rosetta Stone, the Libation-priest is used throughout (beginning at the early lines of the first half of the Decree of Memphis (Ptolemy V), the named Nubayrah Stele). One use on the Rosetta Stone 2nd half of the Libationer-priest is the plural of the priests. The last part of the Decree of Memphis, Ptolemy V-(Rosetta Stone), is to honor Pharaoh Ptolemy by enacting ten items. In the next-to-last line, line R-13, one enactment is:

"The priests (Libationer hieroglyphs), of the temples in temple every by its name, shall be called "priest of the god appearing (epiphanous), lord of benefits," (Greek: eucharistos), in addition to the ranks of priests of them (in addition to their other priestly titles). Let write them it upon documents theirs, ...."

== Example usage: an ostracon ==
An example of a single scene is shown on the pictured ostracon.

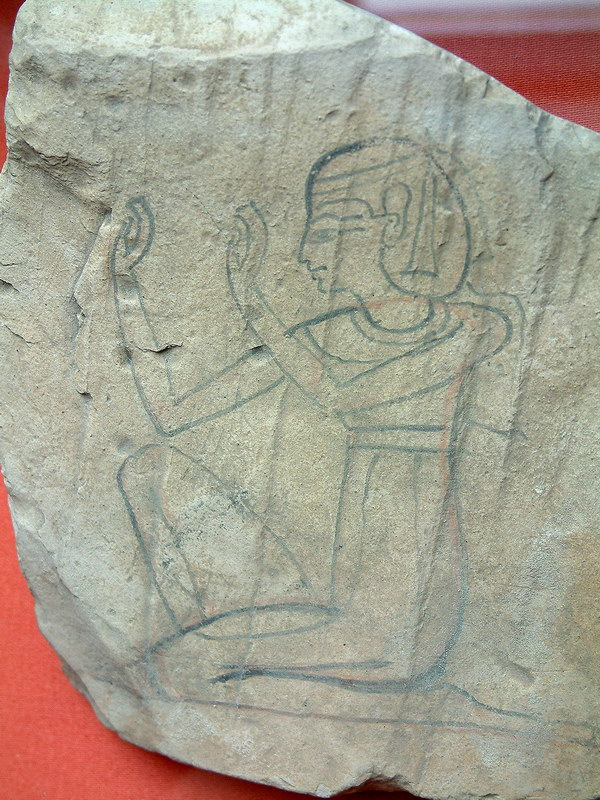
Limestone figured ostracon of a seated individual, presumably a woman

== See also ==
- Gardiner's Sign List#A. Man and his Occupations
- List of Egyptian hieroglyphs
