= Lunette (stele) =

Curved top region of a stele

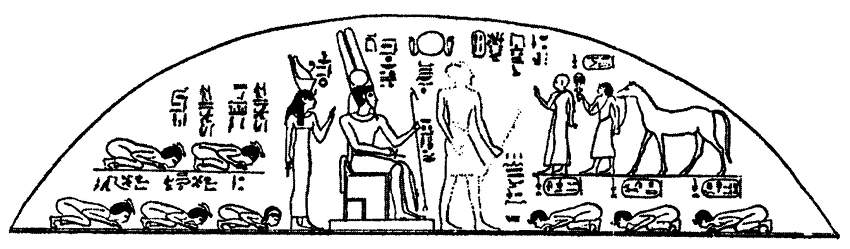
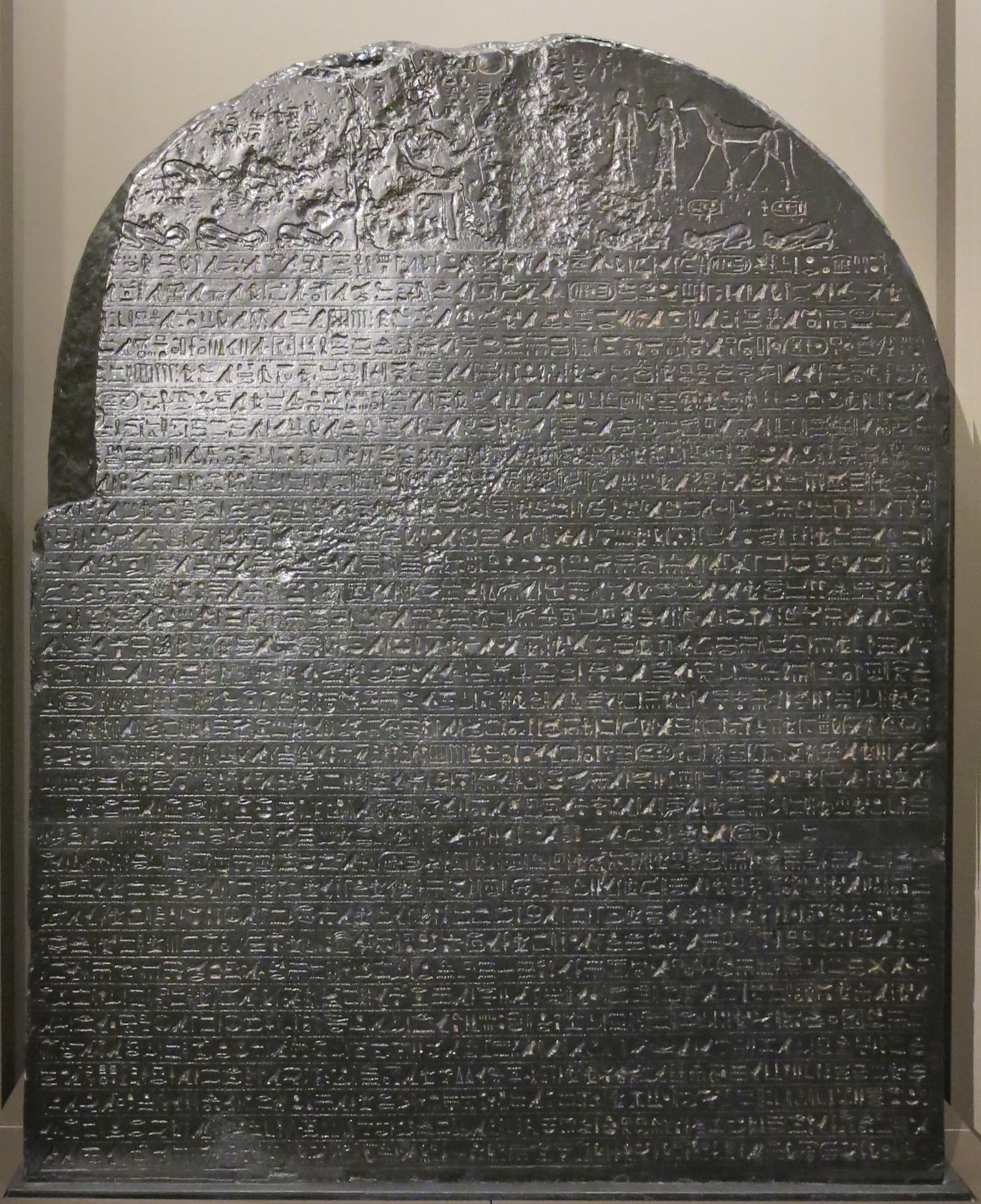
The Victory stele of Piye; drawing of the lunette (above) and picture of the whole stele (below).

The lunette spatial region in the upper portion of steles, became common for steles as a prelude to a stele's topic. Its major use was from ancient Egypt in all the various categories of steles: funerary, Victory steles, autobiographical, temple, votive, etc.

The lunettes are most common from ancient Egyptian steles, as not only is the topic of the stele presented, but honorific gods, presenters, individuals, etc. are previewed, and often with Egyptian hieroglyphic statements.

The main body of the stele is then presented below, often separated with a horizontal line (register), but not always. In Egyptian steles, many have horizontal lines of hieroglyphs; often the lunette will contain shorter vertical statements in hieroglyphs, sometimes just names of the individuals portrayed, hieroglyphs in front, or behind the individual.

== 19th Dynasty Egypt, post Amarna ==
From the post-Amarna period onwards, many personal steles made exhortations to the ancient Egyptian deities; steles to specific gods "were erected to intervene personally with the local god, often to seek justice or offer an explanation for things that had gone wrong in their lives. The deceased is shown kneeling, holding up his hands in prayer, ....." Some of the personal votive steles had ears (hieroglyphs), to represent the gods listening to the supplicant.

== Gallery ==
=== Ancient Egyptian ===
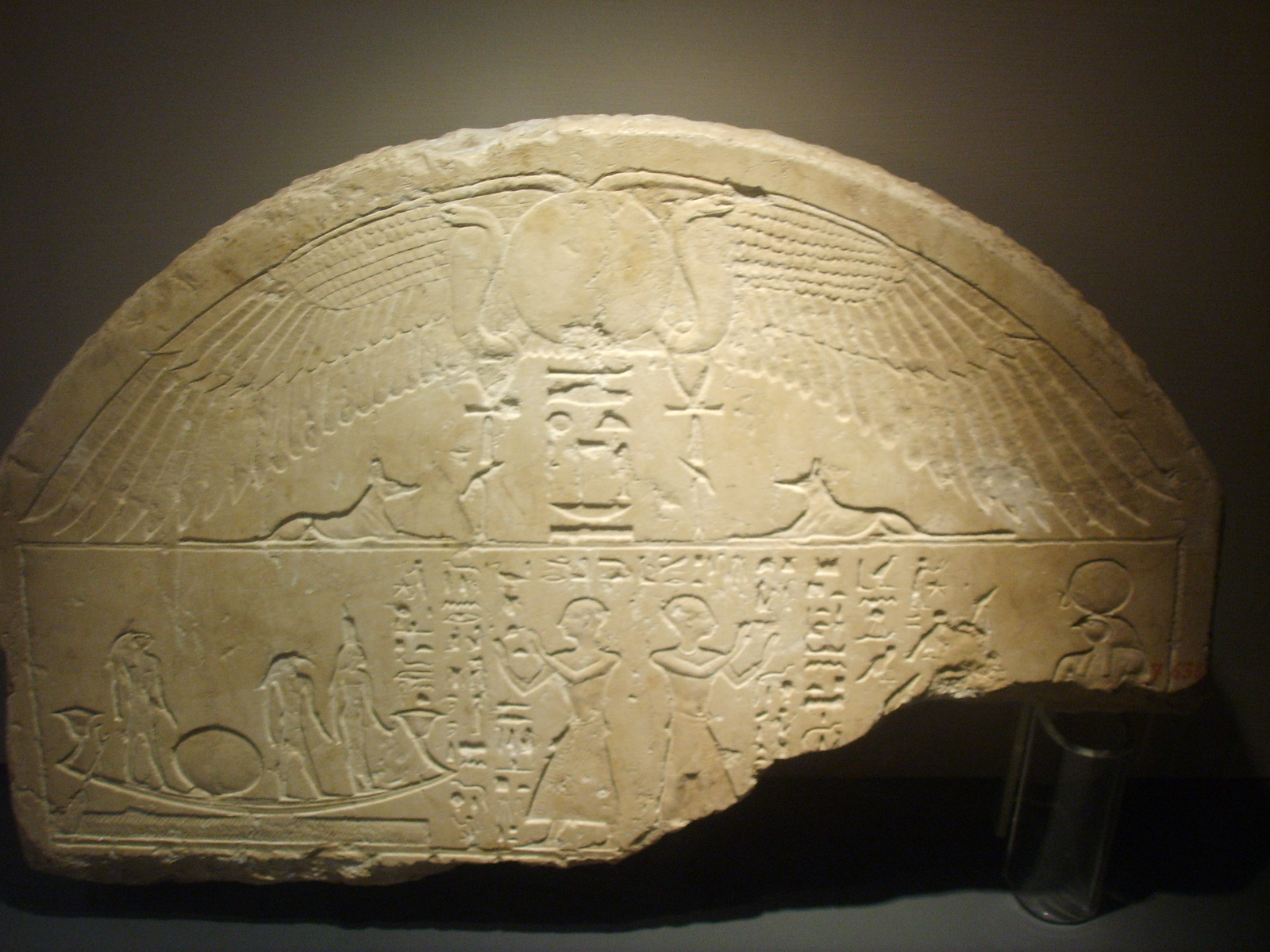
Example of Lunette with Wings, (filling the semicircle top of stele)

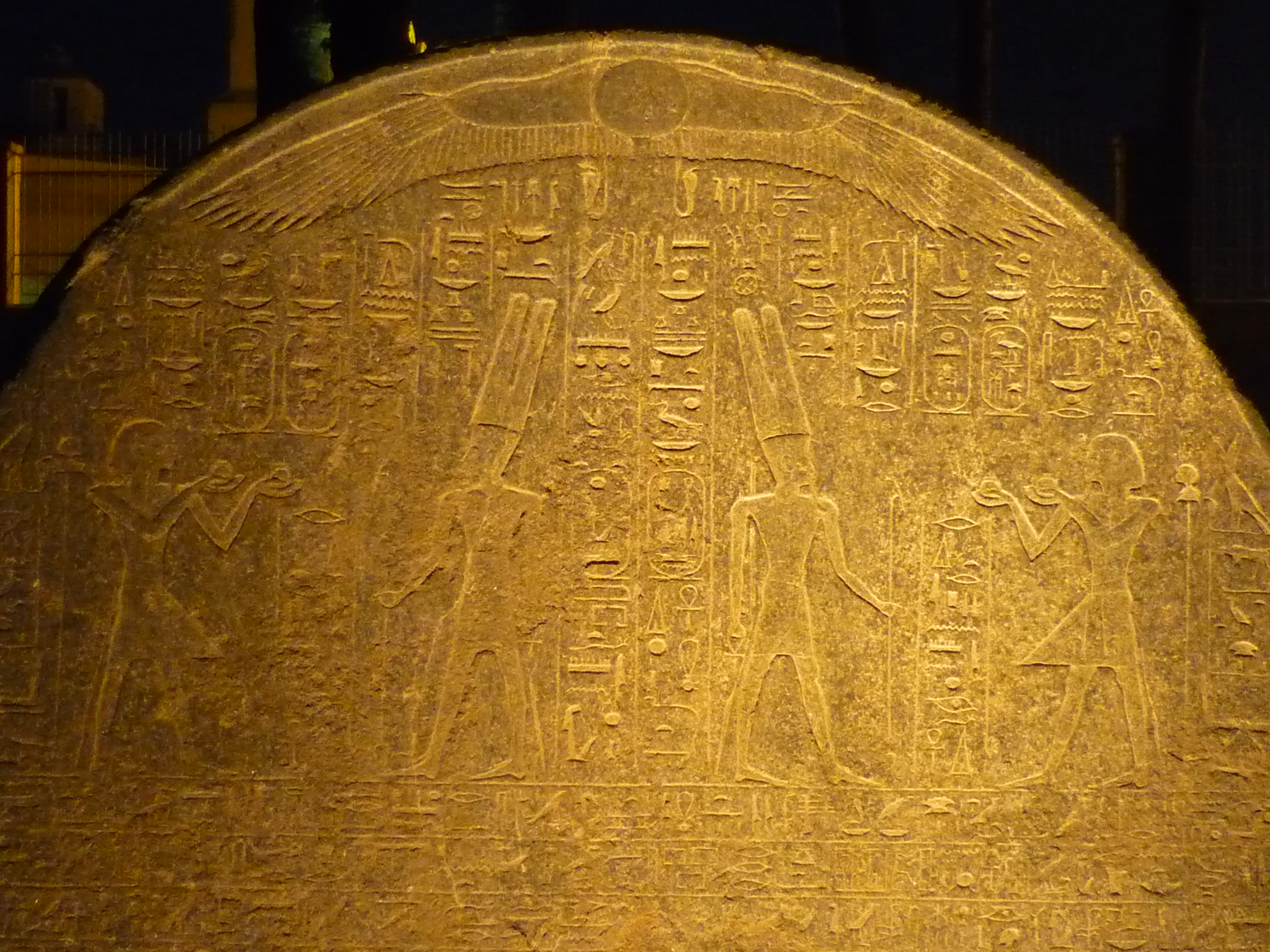
Lunette of upper Ancient Egyptian stele, filled with vertical registers of hieroglyphs

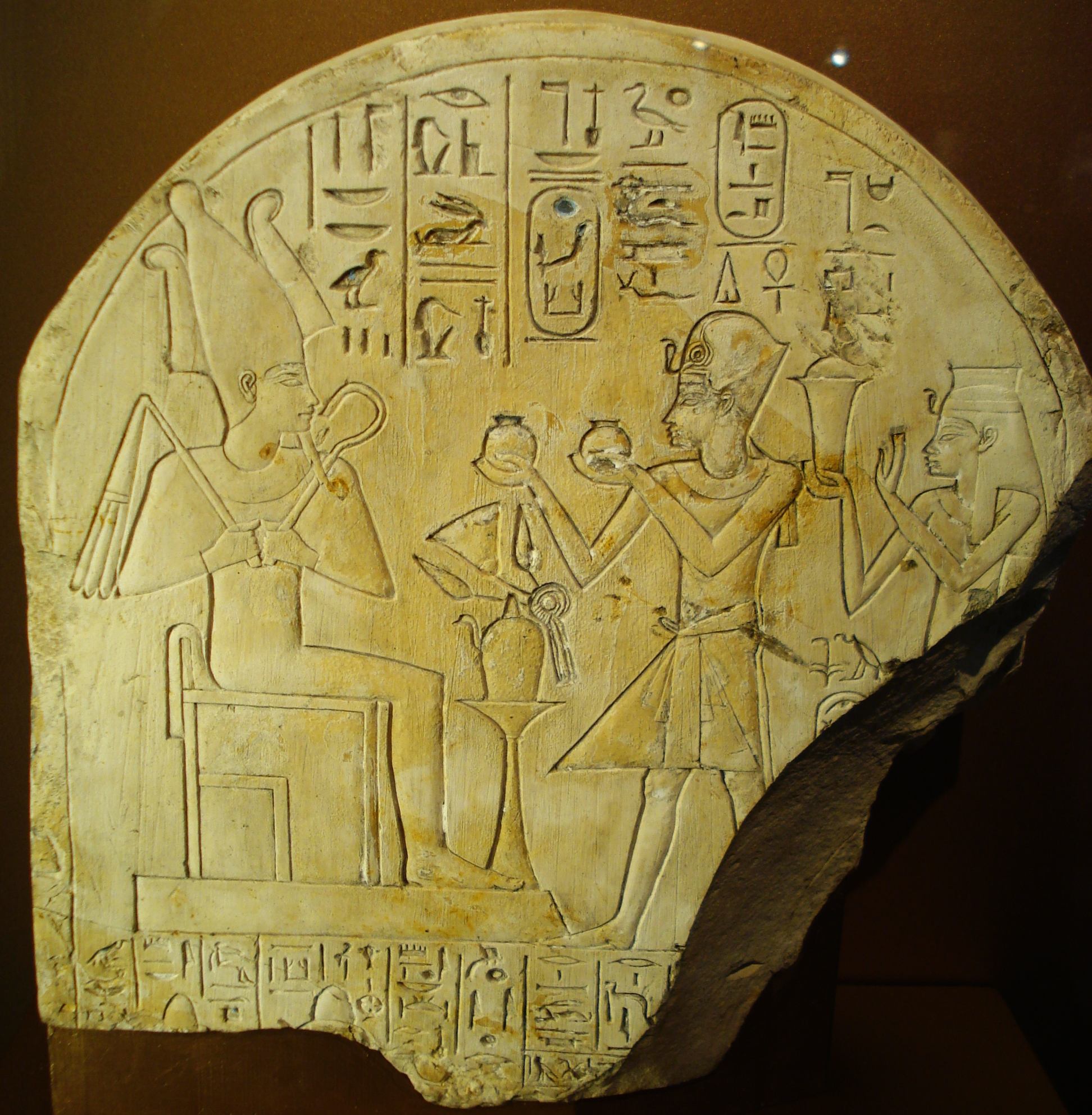

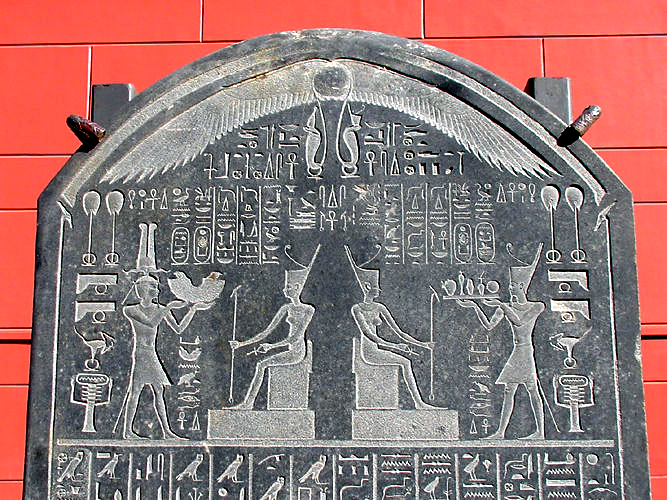
Stele with Decree of Nectanebo I (lunette of the top 1/3 of stele)

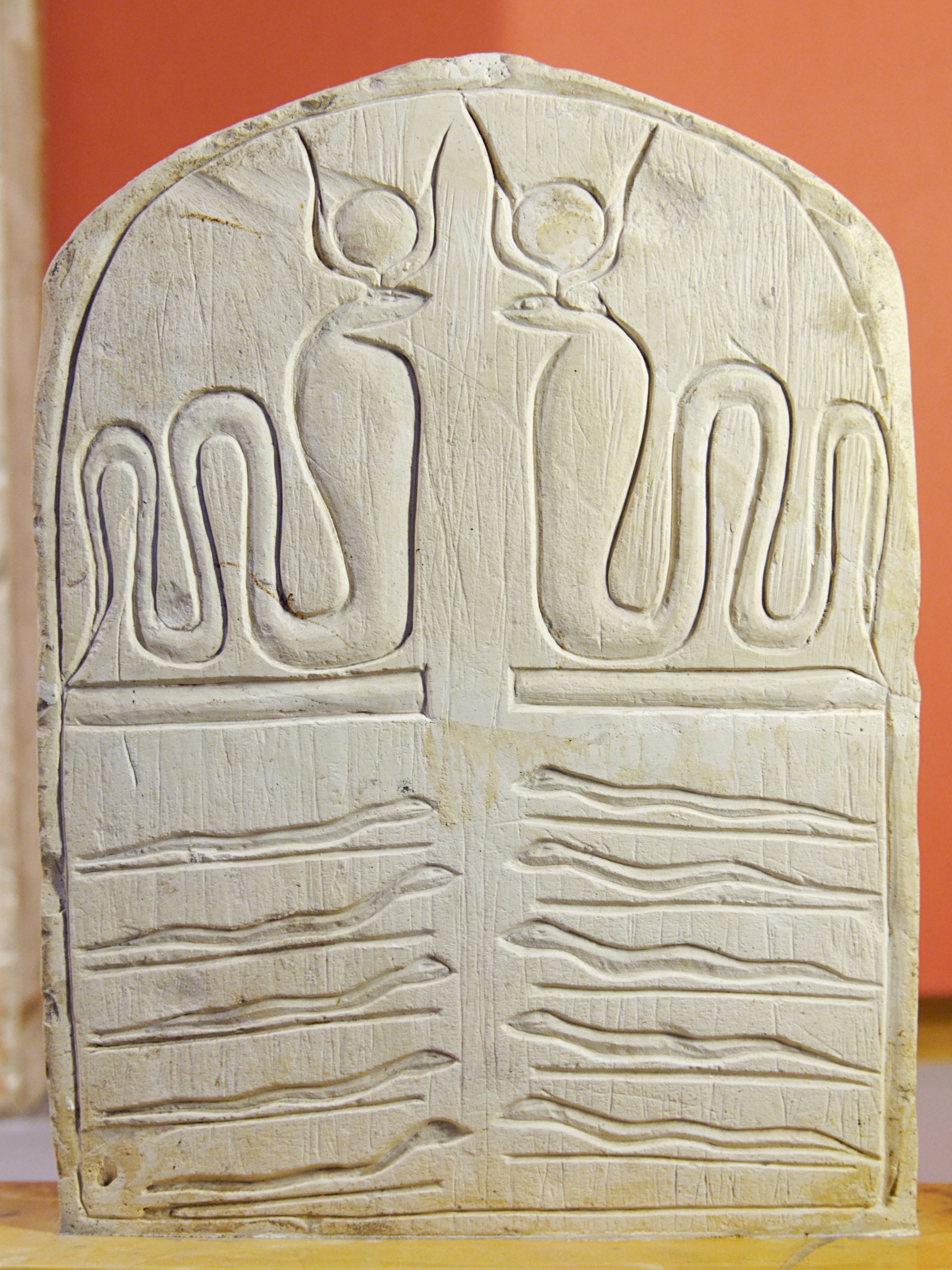
Personal votive stele

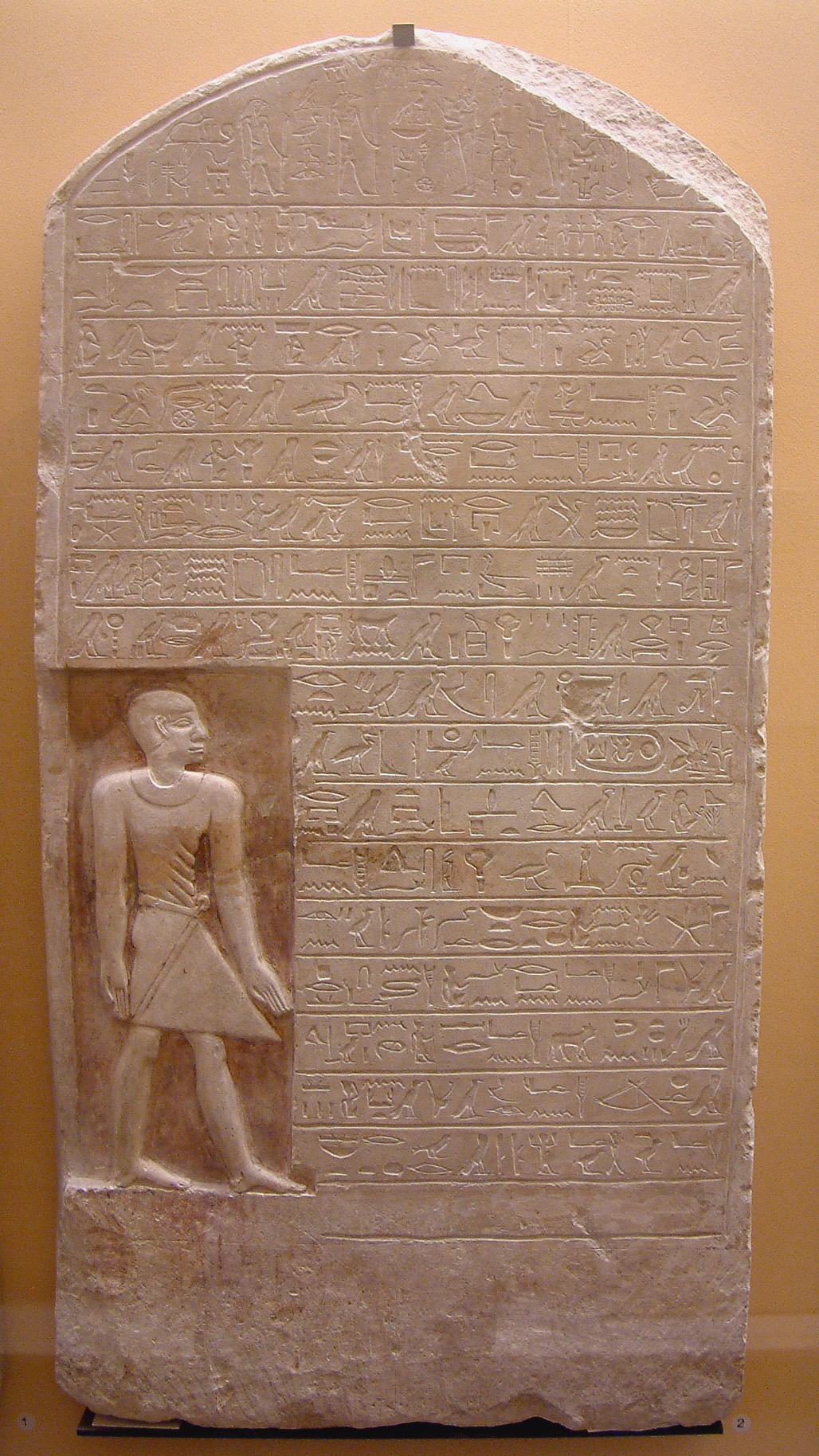
(minor upper lunette)
Deeply incised, bas-relief main body of stele

=== Non-Egyptian ===
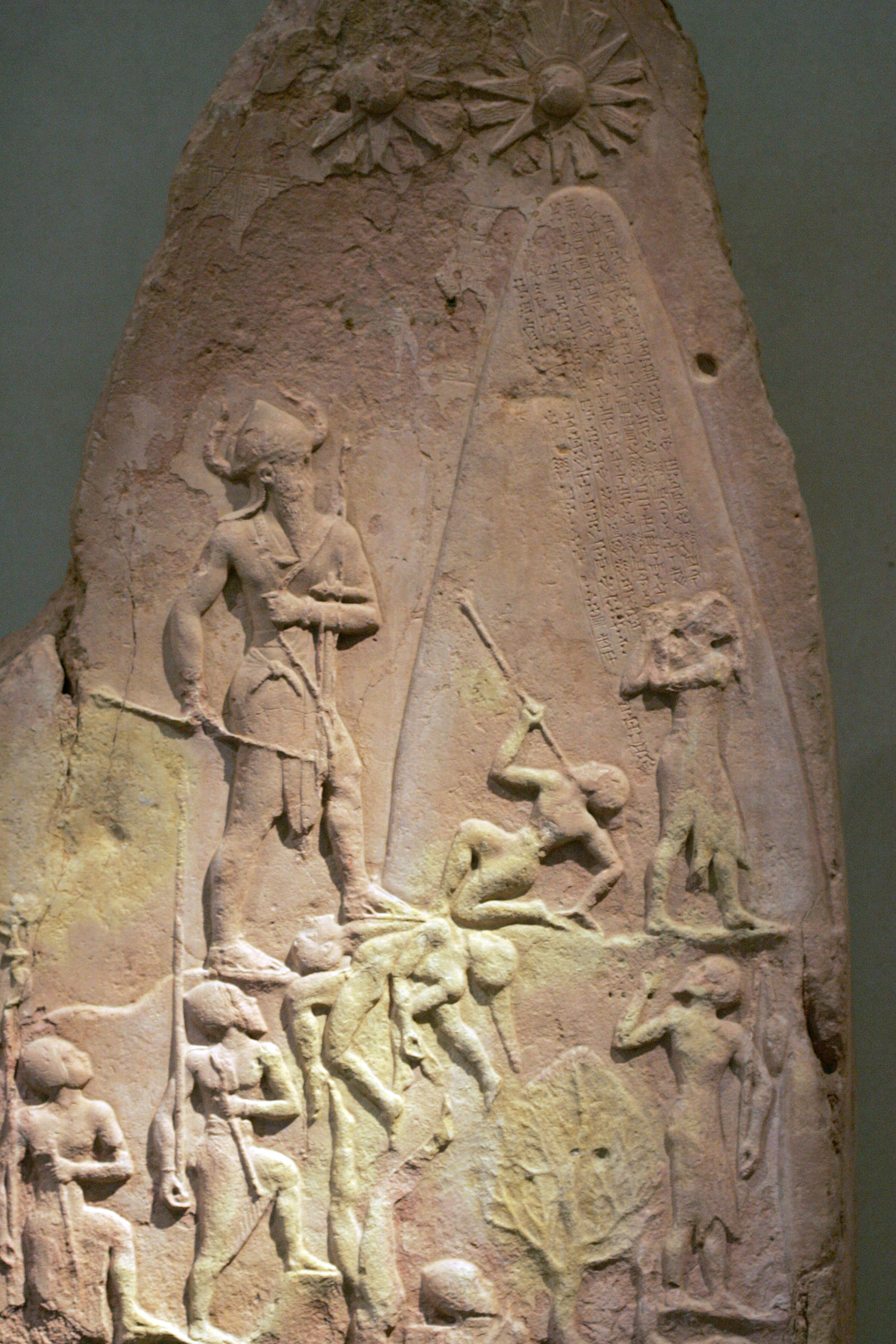
Upper scene from Naram-Sin of Akkad's stele
