= Tetisheri =

- Queen consort of Egypt; Great Royal Wife; King's Mother
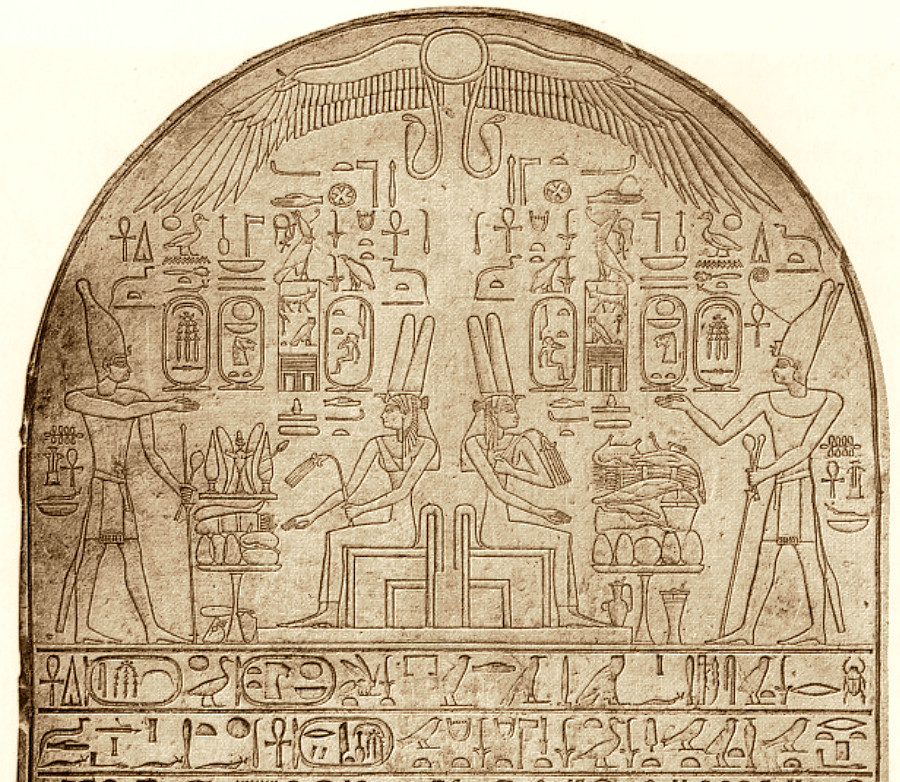
- Stela depicting Tetisheri (seated) and pharaoh Ahmose
- Died: reign of Ahmose I
- Burial: Mummy found in the Deir el-Bahri royal cache, but was likely originally buried in Dra' Abu el-Naga' (possibly KV41?)
- Spouse: Senakhtenre Ahmose
- Issue: Seqenenre Tao; Ahhotep I Sitdjehuti; Ahmose Inhapy
Egyptian name
t t i A17
- Dynasty: 17th of Egypt
- Father: Tjenna
- Mother: Neferu
- Religion: Ancient Egyptian religion

Tetisheri was the matriarch of the Egyptian royal family of the late 17th Dynasty and early 18th Dynasty.

== Family ==
=== Non-royal parentage ===
Tetisheri was the daughter of Tjenna and Neferu. The names of Tetisheri's parents appear to be non-royal and are known from mummy bandages found in TT320.

=== Marriage ===
It is believed she married Senakhtenre, and despite her non-royal birth became a Great Royal Wife. Tetisheri was the mother of Seqenenre Tao, Queen Ahhotep I and possibly Kamose. For sure she was the mother of Satdjehuty/Satibu, as attested on the rishi coffin of the latter.

At Abydos, her grandson king Ahmose I erected a Stela of Queen Tetisheri to announce the construction of a pyramid and a "house" for Tetisheri. Ahmose refers to the Queen as "the mother of my mother, and the mother of my father, great king's wife and king's mother, Tetisheri" (Breasted). This implies that his parents were siblings or half-siblings. Ahmose I was born to Ahhotep I.

== Burial ==
Tetisheri was likely buried in Thebes and she may have been reinterred in the royal cache in TT320. No tomb at Thebes has yet been conclusively identified with Queen Tetisheri, though a mummy that may be hers, known as "Unknown Woman B", was included among other members of the royal family reburied in the Royal Cache.

Pharaoh Ahmose had a memorial structure or cenotaph at Abydos erected in her honour, in the midst of his own extensive mortuary complex at that site. This mudbrick structure was discovered in 1902 by the Egypt Exploration Fund, and was found to contain a monumental stela detailing the dedication by Ahmose I and his sister-wife Ahmose-Nefertari of a pyramid and enclosure (or shrine) to Tetisheri.

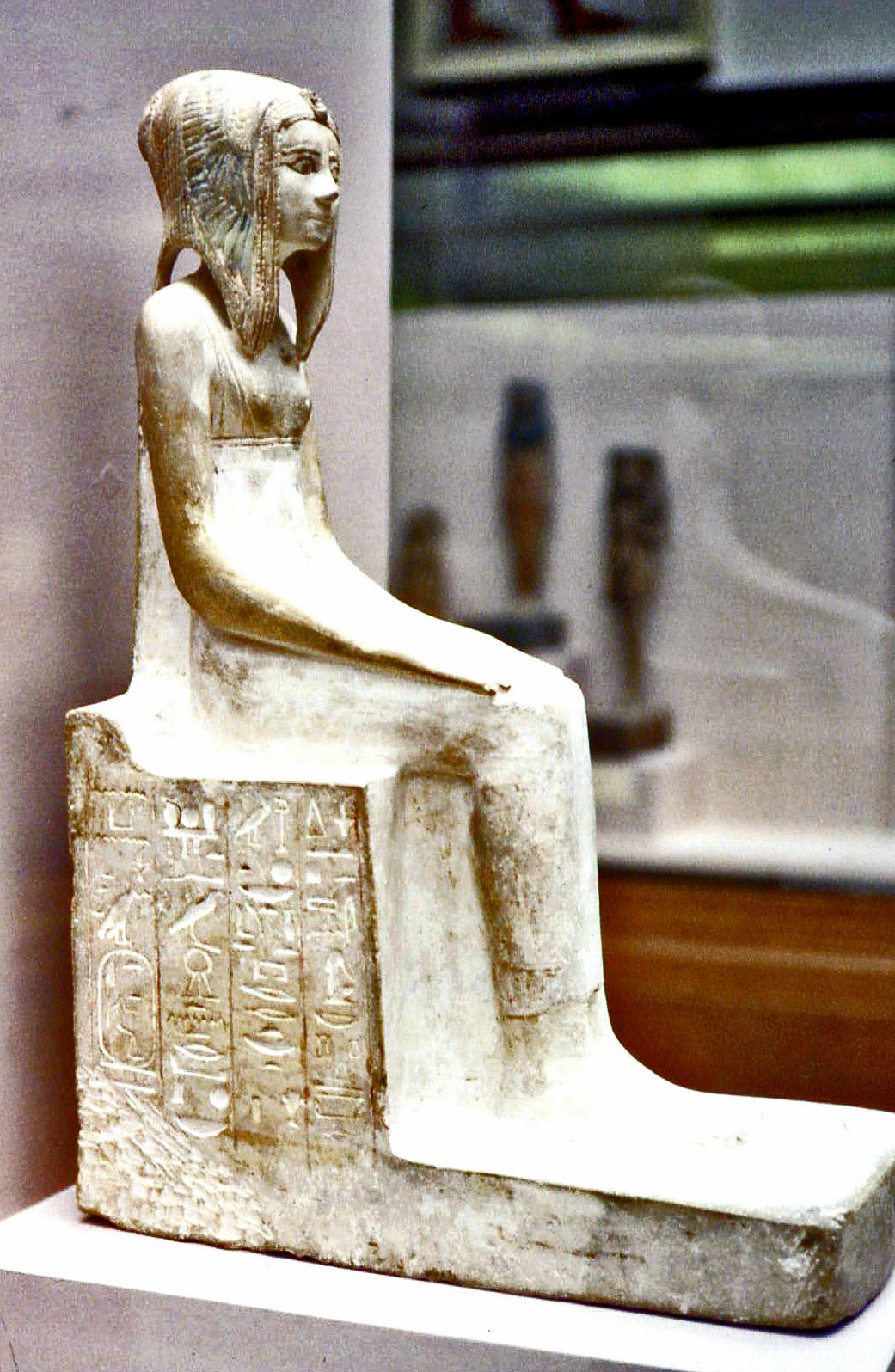
The formerly iconic statuette of Tetisheri, British Museum, now regarded as probably a forgery

Its discoverer, C. T. Currelly, believed the textual reference to a "pyramid" of Tetisheri to refer not to the building in which the stela was found, but rather to the more imposing pyramid associated with a large mortuary temple at its base discovered in 1900 by A. C. Mace. Based on recent discoveries, however, this view can no longer be maintained. The foundations of the structure, originally described by Currelly in 1903 as a "shrine" or "mastaba," was demonstrated in 2004 through the renewed excavations of the Oriental Institute, University of Chicago under the direction of S. Harvey to have actually formed the lowest courses of a brick pyramid, the last queen's pyramid to have been built in Egypt. Portions of the limestone pyramidion or capstone were discovered as well, demonstrating conclusively that this structure was pyramidal in form. Magnetic survey also revealed a brick enclosure some 70 by 90 meters in scale, a feature not detected by earlier archaeologists. These accordingly may now be identified as the features described in Ahmose's stela found within: a pyramid and an enclosure, built in the midst of Ahmose's own mortuary complex.

== Attestations ==
- Statuette (fake?) | A statuette long in the collections of the British Museum bearing an inscription naming Tetisheri was identified as a forgery by W. V. Davies, based on the slavish imitation of its inscription from a fragmentary lower portion of a similar statue of the queen (now lost). However, some scholars question this attribution, and have been raising questions as to the potential authenticity of the statuette itself, if not the inscription.
- Cairo CG 34002 | At Abydos, a stela of Ahmose I.
- Petrie UC 14402 | At Armant, a stela with the royal name of Nebpethy Ahmose mentions King's Mother Teti (mwt-nsw ttj, cartouche) and some restorations of the local temple. The epithet "Sherit" (šrt) is missing. A feature with the stela is that the jꜥḥ-sign (N11/N12) in the name of Ahmose was turned upside down.
- München ÄS 7163 + ÄS 7220 | A wooden rishi coffin of King’s Daughter Sat-Djehuty/Sat-Ibu (no cartouche), born to King’s Wife Teti (no cartouche).
- TT320 Mummy Bandages: her name (ttj-šrj) without cartouche is written in standard hieroglyphs/cursive hieroglyphs alongside her non-royal parents, Tjenna and Neferu.

== See also ==
- Stela of Queen Tetisheri
