= Senakhtenre Ahmose =

7th king of the 17th dynasty of Egypt

- Ahmose the Elder
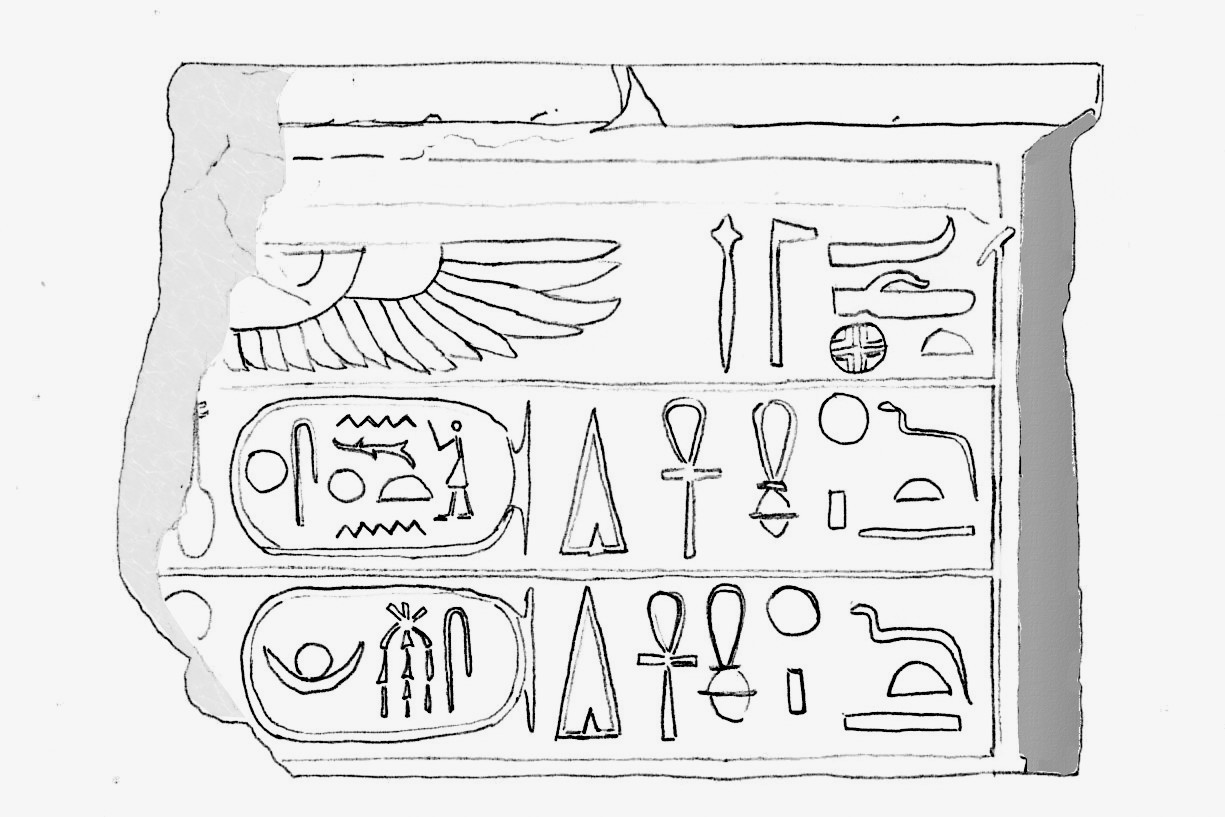
- Lintel bearing Senakhtenre's cartouches, from Karnak

Pharaoh
- Reign: c. 1-2 years?
- Predecessor: Sekhemre-Heruhirmaat Intef
- Successor: Seqenenre Tao
Royal titulary
Horus name
Merymaat
Mry-M3ˁt
Beloved of Maat
G5	mr i i mAat t Z1
Prenomen
Senakhtenre
Snḫt.n-Rˁ
Perpetuated like Ra
M23 t L2 t < N5 S29 N35 M3 Aa1 X1 N35 A24 >
Karnak king list:
Senakhtenre
Snḫt.n-Rˁ
Perpetuated like Ra
M23 t L2 t < N5 O34 N35 M3 Aa1 X1 D40 N35 >
Nomen
Ahmose
Jˁḥ-ms
Iah bore him
G39 N5 < N12 ms s >
- Consort: Tetisheri
- Children: Seqenenre Tao, Ahhotep I, Ahmose Inhapi, Sitdjehuty
- Father: Possibly Nubkheperre Intef
- Died: 1560 or 1558 BC (Possibly)
- Dynasty: 17th Dynasty

Senakhtenre Ahmose, also known as Ahmose the Elder, was a king of the Seventeenth Dynasty of Egypt during the Second Intermediate Period. Senakhtenre reigned for a short period over the Theban region in Upper Egypt at a time when the Hyksos 15th Dynasty ruled Lower Egypt. Senakhtenre died c. 1560 or 1558 BC at the latest.

== Family ==
He may or may not have been the son of Nubkheperre Intef, the most prominent of the Intef kings.

The Danish Egyptologist Kim Ryholt observes that "since Senaktenre was remembered as one of the Lords of the West alongside Seqenenre and Kamose, he is generally believed to have been a member of the family of Ahmose and as such identified with the otherwise unidentified spouse" of Queen Tetisheri, Ahmose's grandmother.

He was succeeded by his son, Seqenenre Tao. King Senakhtenre would also be the husband of Tetisheri who is called the "great king's wife" and "the mother of my mother" in a stela at Abydos by pharaoh Ahmose I. Senakhtenre was, therefore, the grandfather of Ahmose I.

== Attestations ==
Unlike his two successors, Seqenenre and Kamose, Senakhtenre is a relatively obscure king and, until 2012, was not attested "by [any] contemporary sources (by his prenomen) but exclusively by sources dating from the New Kingdom: the Karnak king list [of Tuthmose III] and [in] two Theban tombs." Donald Redford's book mentions these 2 Theban tombs. The archaeological evidence prior to 2012 suggests that his reign was brief and lasted several months or 1 year at the most. However, in 2012, two important contemporary monuments of this king were uncovered at Karnak: a doorway found carved with his royal name as well as a fragmentary limestone lintel. The doorway or gate is carved with other hieroglyphic inscriptions which state that Senaktenre had this monument, which is carved from limestone blocks, transported from Tura (modern Helwan, south of Cairo), which was under Hyksos rule during his reign.

== Senakhtenre's nomen ==
=== Pre-2012 hypotheses ===
From a reference in the Abbott Papyrus (Column III, 1.10) it was for a long time believed that Senakhtenre's nomen was Tao, hence him being called "Tao The Elder" by some archaeologists. Indeed, the papyrus mentions two kings with the name Tao. The second king Tao was identified with Senakhtenre because the first mention of a Tao refers to Seqenenre Tao for which the complete name is written. Consequently, the hypothesis that Senakhtenre's nomen was Tao was dominant in egyptology until 2012 and was shared for example by Darrell Baker, although it also remained controversial. For example, the Egyptologist Claude Vandersleyen rejected this view as early as 1983. Furthermore, in his 1997 study of the second intermediate period, the egyptologist Kim Ryholt proposed that Senakhtenre's nomen may have been Siamun rather than Tao:

This nomen is inscribed on one of two stamp-seals found together in a tomb at Dra Abu el-Naga, the other being inscribed with the prenomen Seqenenre [whose nomen was Tao]. It has been suggested that Siamun here was used as an epithet. In that case, it would stand in the place of a nomen since it follows immediately upon the title 'Son of Re.' However, apart from the fact that Kamose sometimes replaced his with the epithet 'the mighty ruler'...for political reasons during the war with Apophis, the title 'Son of Re' is always followed by a proper nomen during the Second Intermediate Period. Since Siamun was a popular name during this period and the New Kingdom, it seems more likely that we are dealing with a name than an epithet. The fact that the two seals were found together and are virtually identical in workmanship suggests that they were produced at about the same time and given to the official from whose tomb they come. Siamun must therefore be more or less contemporary with Seqenenre, and since it is not possible to identify Siamun with his successor (this being Kamose), it may be suggested that Siamun was the nomen of his predecessor Senakhtenre.

=== Senakhtenre's nomen discovered ===
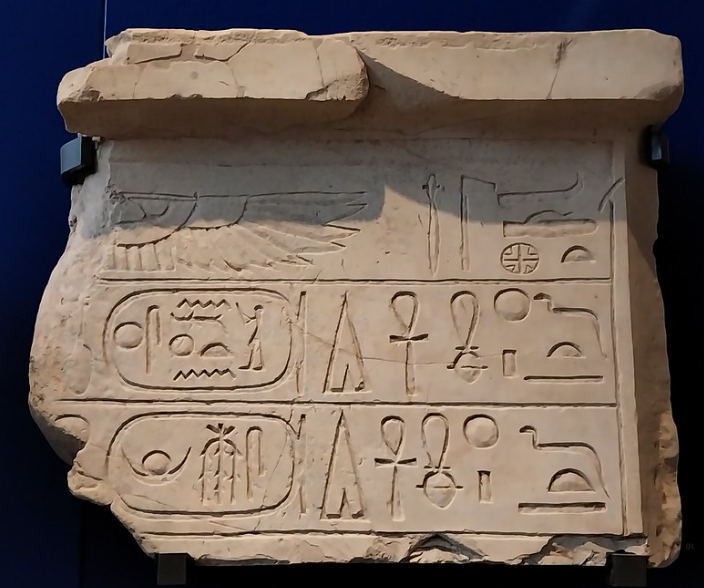
Door lintle with name Senakhtenre Ahmose

The situation completely changed in March 2012 when the French Egyptologist Sébastien Biston-Moulin of the CFEETK (Centre Franco-Égyptien d'Étude des Temples de Karnak) published hieroglyphic inscriptions discovered on a large 17th dynasty limestone doorjamb built for a granary of a temple of Amun at Karnak. The doorjamb bears Senakhtenre's full royal name and reveals his nomen to have been Ahmose. This is the same name as that of his grandson, Nebpehtyre Ahmose I, who founded the 18th Dynasty by defeating the Hyksos and ousting them from Egypt. Inscriptions on the door indicate that it was built following the orders of Senakhtenre himself. The door was subsequently re-used and discovered in the foundations of a later building adjoining the temple of Ptah at Karnak. Senakhtenre's royal titulary as revealed by the door is "Hr mry-mAa.t nswt bjty snxt-n-ra sA ra jaH-ms", which translates as "The Horus Merymaat, the king of Upper and Lower Egypt Senakhtenre, the Son of Re Ahmes." The inscription on the reused door proceeds to state that Senakhtenre "made a monument for his father Amun-Re (i.e., the door itself)...from the beautiful white stone of Anu." Anu is the modern Tura, located near Cairo, which could mean that Senakhtenre imported the limestone from the then Hyksos controlled area of Tura in Lower Egypt. However, Biston-Moulin cautions that "beautiful white stone of Anu" was sometimes used as a generic term for stones which were actually taken from local quarries. Meanwhile, a fragmentary lintel uncovered by the same team of French scholars bore this inscription which mentioned Senakhtenre's nomen:

Behdeti, the great god

- [Long live the god] made [by] Senakht-en-Re given life like Re forever!
- [Cheers] the son of Re Ahmes given life like Re forever!

These two separate inscriptions on the granary door and fragmentary lintel found in January–February 2012 at Karnak demonstrate that king Senakhtenre's nomen or birth name was 'Ahmose' ('Ahmes' in Ancient Egyptian) and not 'Tao' as previously thought. Biston-Moulin writes in the summary of his article:

Publication of two elements of a granary door bearing the name of king Senakhtenre Ahmose recently discovered near the temple of Ptah at Karnak. The inscriptions allow this king of the seventeenth dynasty, previously only known through the coronation name in later king-lists, to be identified more precisely. They also finally resolve uncertainties about his birth name: Ahmose. The designations of Senakhtenre Tao I or Senakhtenre Siamun for this king must be abandoned. Suggestions for identifying the king’s tomb in the Ramesside report of investigations in the Theban necropolis recorded in Papyrus Abbott must also be rejected. Only one king bears the birth name Tao: Seqenenre. That Ahmose is the son of Re name of Senakhtenre leads to the conclusion that this king must be a member of the Ahmoside royal family of the late seventeenth and early eighteenth dynasties, of which he is to date the oldest known representative. Finally, documents that bear only the son of Re name "Ahmose" can now be attributed to either Senakhtenre Ahmose or Nebpehtyre Ahmose.

Despite his nomen being identified, the modern day epithet "The Elder" was kept by archaeologists to difference him from later pharaohs of the same, hence becoming "Ahmose The Elder".

== Burial ==
The Tomb of Senakhtenre Ahmose has not been located, but is believed to be in the Dra' Abu el-Naga' necropolis in the west opposite Thebes.

== Bibliography ==
- Clayton, Peter (2006). Chronicle of the Pharaohs. Thames and Hudson Ltd. ISBN 0500050740.
- Redford, Donald (1986). "Pharaonic King-Lists, Annals, and Day-Books: A Contribution to the Study of the Egyptian Sense of History". SSEA Publication (IV ed.). Mississauga, Ontario: Benben Publications.
- Ryholt, Kim (1997). The Political Situation in Egypt during the Second Intermediate Period. Copenhagen: Museum Tusculanum Press: Carsten Niebuhr Institute Publications. ISBN 87-7289-421-0.
- Biston-Moulin, Sébastien. Le roi Sénakht-en-Rê Ahmès de la XVIIe dynastie, ENiM 5, 2012, pp.61-71 (with an English summary)

Preceded by Sekhemre-Heruhirmaat Intef	Pharaoh of Egypt; Seventeenth Dynasty	Succeeded by Seqenenre Tao
