= Three fox skins (hieroglyph) =

Egyptian hieroglyph

F31
3-Fox-Skins

ms
in hieroglyphs

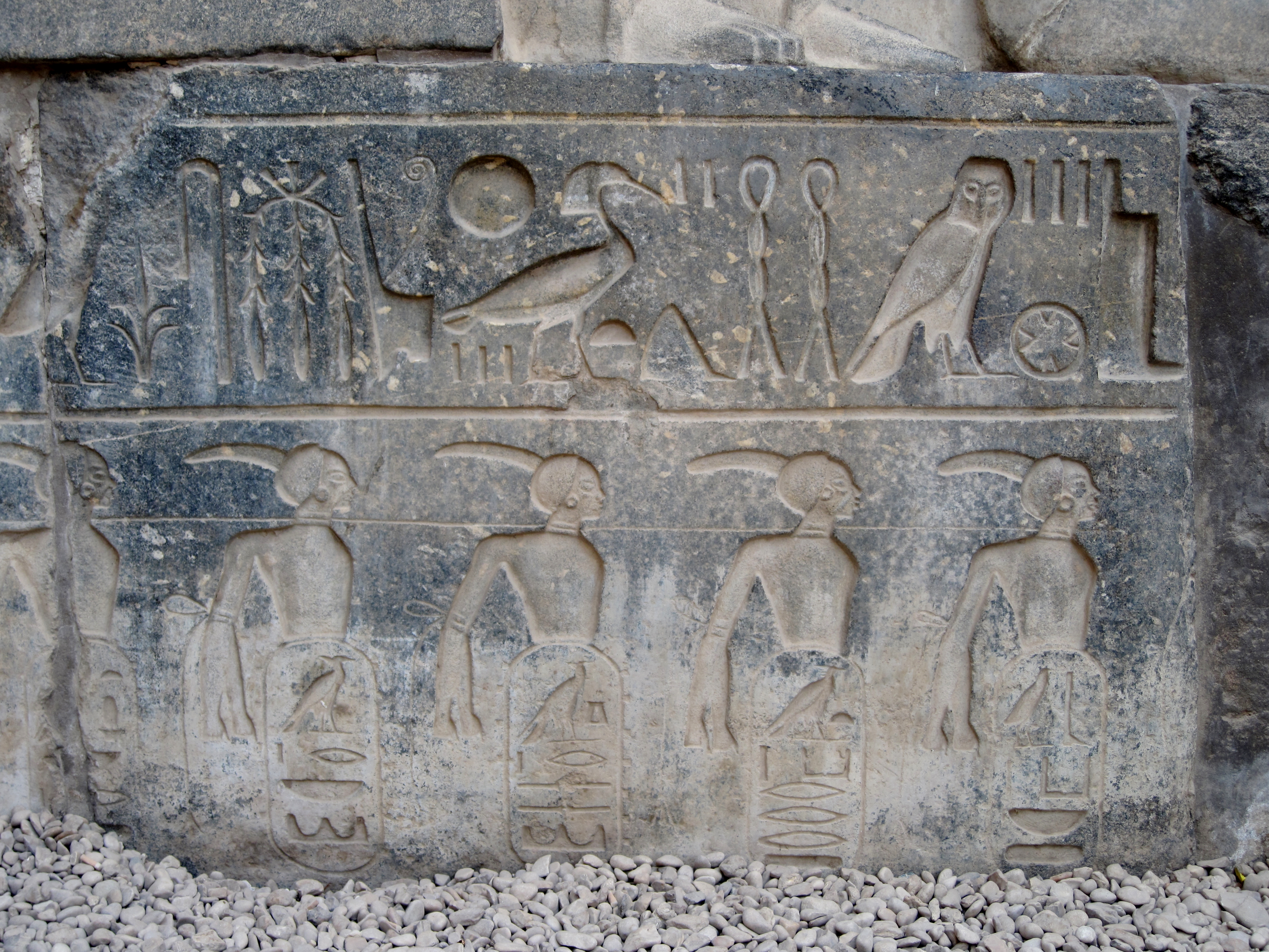
Temple relief at Luxor.

The Three-Fox-Skins (hieroglyph) is Gardiner's sign listed no. F31, in the series of parts of animals. It consists of 3-fox skins tied at one end, and hanging, creating flowing skins.

In Egyptian hieroglyphs it has the value ms. The word in Egyptian means birth, and related items: to bring forth, produce, fashion, create, etc.

The 3-fox-skin hieroglyph has its origins in the early dynasties of Ancient Egypt, and can be found in multiple usage on the Palermo Stone, (creation or inauguration of events).

== See also ==
- Gardiner's Sign List#F. Parts of Mammals
- List of Egyptian hieroglyphs
