= Faculty of Medieval and Modern Languages, University of Oxford =

University department in Oxford, England

Faculty of Medieval and Modern Languages
- Affiliations: University of Oxford
- Chair: Prof Phillip Rothwell
- Academic staff: 106
- Undergraduates: c. 270
- Postgraduates: c. 50
- Doctoral students: c. 120
- Location: Stephen A. Schwarzman Centre for the Humanities, Oxford, United Kingdom
- Website: www.mod-langs.ox.ac.uk

The Faculty of Medieval and Modern Languages is an academic department of the Humanities Division at the University of Oxford in Oxford, England, United Kingdom.

The Faculty offers various undergraduate and postgraduate degrees in European languages; non-European languages are taught at the Faculty of Asian and Middle Eastern Studies.

== Historical overview ==
Modern languages, as opposed to ancient ones, were not taught in Oxford for much of the university's history. In 1724, a donation by George I was intended to provide teaching in French and German to train future diplomats, but the scheme soon failed. Another endowment, by Sir Robert Taylor (1714–1788), was contested by his son so that the university only received the sum (of £65,000) in 1835. The money was invested, and it was only in 1844 that the Hebdomadal Board proposed that Modern Languages should be taught within the university. By then the construction of two contiguous, grandly harmonious buildings was almost complete. The first, the Randolph or 'University' Galleries, was to house galleries for statues and paintings, and is now called the Ashmolean Museum. The matching second building was designed to house lecture rooms and libraries for the study of European languages, and is now the Taylor Institution. The Faculty's administrative offices, as well as some teaching rooms, were long situated in Wellington Square. These functions moved to the new Schwarzman Centre for the Humanities in October 2025.

Initially there were only two Taylorian Teachers, one in French and one in German. In 1847, Jules Bué was appointed to teach French; he also produced the first French translation of Alice in Wonderland. In 1848, F.H. Trithen was appointed as the first Professor of Modern European Languages. He was followed by the Germanist and Orientalist Friedrich Max Müller (1854–68), who went on to become Professor of Comparative Philology. A statute for the Founding of the Faculty of Medieval and Modern Languages was approved by Congregation in 1903, and the Faculty's first examinations were held in 1905. The University of Oxford also has the only established Chair of the Romance Languages in Britain, which dates back to 1909, though since 2008 this chair has been shared with the new Faculty of Linguistics, Philology and Phonetics.

The Faculty of Medieval and Modern Languages now offers various languages for study at (post-A-level) undergraduate level, including French, German, Spanish, Russian, Italian, Portuguese, Modern Greek, Czech, Polish and Celtic. Many of these, especially the less commonly taught languages, can be taken up at beginner's level, otherwise known as ab initio.

In 2018, 2019, 2020 and 2021 the Times Higher Education World University Rankings placed the University of Oxford first in the world in the category Languages, Literature and Linguistics.

== French and Francophone Studies ==
Oxford's French sub-faculty is the largest French studies department outside France, with over thirty permanent members of staff covering all areas of French literature and language. The quality and range of the department's research was recognised in two Research Assessment Exercises (RAEs). In 2001 the department received the top grade of 5*. In the 2008 RAE, it performed better than any other French department in the UK. The French department was said by The Times in May 2010 to be the best university French department for teaching in the United Kingdom. The Chair of the Marshal Foch Professor of French Literature (held in conjunction with a Fellowship at All Souls College) was established in 1918 after a donation of £25,000 by Sir Basil Zaharoff. The same 'Zaharoff fund' also provides for the annual Zaharoff Lecture, for which the Sub-Faculty of French invites an eminent figure from French literary studies.

The Sub-Faculty of French has ongoing links with other Oxford-based institutions, notably the Maison Française d'Oxford (MFO) and the Voltaire Foundation. The journal French Studies was founded in 1947 in Oxford and has its editorial office near the Faculty's central offices in Wellington Square.

Some notable past members of the Sub-Faculty of French include:

- Malcolm Bowie, Marshal Foch Professor 1992–2002, Proust scholar
- Ann Jefferson, Professor of French 2006–2015
- Jean Seznec, Marshal Foch Professor 1950–1972, author of La Survivance des dieux antiques (1940)
- Enid Starkie (Somerville 1934–1965), known for her work on French poets
- Jean-Yves Tadié, Marshal Foch Professor 1988–1991, Proust scholar

== German ==
There are two chairs associated with German studies. The Taylor Chair of the German Language and Literature was first held by Hermann Georg Fiedler. The chair was held 2010-2021 by Ritchie Robertson. The Chair of Medieval German (previously Medieval German Language and Literature, then Medieval German Literature and Linguistics) was established for Peter Ganz, then held by Nigel F Palmer and since 2015 by Henrike Lähnemann.

== Modern Greek ==
Oxford University is one of four universities in Britain where Medieval and Modern Greek can be studied as a major component of a B.A. degree and at graduate level. A variety of undergraduate courses are offered in Modern Greek language and literature from the foundation of Constantinople (AD 330) to the present day, as well as additional courses in Modern Greek history, cinema, and culture. Graduate courses in Medieval and Modern Greek literature include taught Master's courses and research degrees (M.Litt. and D.Phil.).

Notable past members of the Sub-Faculty of Modern Greek include Professor Elizabeth Jeffreys.

== Italian ==
Oxford's Italian sub-faculty is one of the largest Italian departments in the UK, covering all areas of Italian literature and language. The department's research has been recognized as outstanding in the last two Research Assessment Exercises. In 2001 it was awarded the top grade of 5*, and in the 2008 RAE it maintained its position as one of the top departments of Italian in the UK, with 60% of its research output being classed as internationally excellent or world-leading. The Chair of the Serena Professor of Italian (held in conjunction with a Fellowship at Magdalen College, Oxford) was established in 1918 thanks to a donation of £10,000 by Arthur Serena. In 1990 the chair was renamed the Fiat-Serena Chair of Italian Studies and in 2009 the name was further modified to become the Agnelli-Serena Chair of Italian Studies, in order to reflect the generous benefaction given by Gianni Agnelli, Head of Fiat, at the end of the 1980s. The Sub-Faculty of Italian has strong links with the main research network at Oxford for scholars working on any aspect of Italy.

== Portuguese ==
The chair associated with Portuguese studies is the King John II chair in Portuguese held by Phillip Rothwell since 2015.

== Slavonic languages ==
The Sub-Faculty of Slavonic Languages (previously known as the Sub-Faculty of Russian) was awarded a top-ranking 5* grade in the 2001 Research Assessment Exercise. The Samuel Johnson prize for non-fiction was awarded for the authoritative biography of Pushkin by Dr T.J. Binyon (June 2003). The teaching of Russian in Oxford was established by William Morfill (Reader 1889, Professor 1900), the first professor of Russian and Slavonic languages in Britain. The chair in Russian is currently held by Andrei Zorin. The sub-faculty also teaches Czech (with Slovak) and Polish.

== Spanish ==
The Sub-faculty of Spanish at Oxford, which celebrated its centenary in 2005, is one of the largest departments of Spanish and Spanish-American studies in the UK, with 14 full-time permanent staff as well as part-time and temporary lecturers and native speakers. It offers courses in all areas of Spanish and Spanish American literatures and language, as well as options in the Catalan and Galician languages and literatures. It has maintained its position as one of the top departments of Spanish in the UK, with 60% of its research output being classed as internationally excellent or world-leading in the 2008 RAE.

The King Alfonso XIII Chair of Spanish Studies, held in conjunction with a Fellowship at Exeter College, was endowed in 1927 by a donation from Lord Nuffield and others. The Queen Sofía Research Fellowship in Modern Spanish Literature was founded in 1988 and is also associated with Exeter College, of which H.M. the Queen of Spain is an Honorary Fellow.

The Sub-Faculty regularly hosts lectures by writers and academics in the Spanish-speaking world. A number of Spanish writers have been teachers in the Sub-faculty; these include Jorge Guillén from 1929 to 31, Dámaso Alonso from 1931 to 1933, José Angel Valente from 1955 to 1958, Vicente Molina Foix from 1976 to 1979, Félix de Azúa from 1979 to 1981 and Javier Marías from 1983 to 1985. The novel Todas las almas (1989; trans. All Souls, 1992) by Javier Marías is set in Oxford and alludes to several members of the Sub-faculty during his time there.

Some notable past members of the Spanish Sub-faculty include:

- Salvador de Madariaga, King Alfonso XIII Professor (1928–31), scholar, novelist historian and statesman. Variously ambassador to Washington and Paris, delegate to the League of Nations, and Minister of Education during the Spanish Republic. Early advocate of European integration and founder of the College of Europe at Bruges.
- Sir Peter Edward Russell, King Alfonso XIII Professor (1953–82), expert in medieval and early-modern literature. Distinguished record in the intelligence services during World War II. The model for 'Sir Peter Wheeler', a major character in four novels by Javier Marías.

== Celtic ==
The Jesus Professorship of Celtic was the first chair to be established in the Faculty, in 1877 with John Rhys as the first professor. It is the only chair in Celtic at an English university. In 2020, with the appointment of David Willis, the chair was transferred to the Faculty of Linguistics.

== Studying languages at Oxford ==
Most students at Oxford study two languages, though some languages can also be studied as a sole-degree course, or as a part of a joint degree alongside a Middle-Eastern language, History, English, Classics, Philosophy or Linguistics. While most teaching takes place in the different colleges of the university, lectures are generally held in the Taylor Institution or Taylorian, where the modern languages library is situated. The four-year B.A. degree includes a compulsory year abroad, spent either enrolled at a university or with paid or volunteer work in a foreign country where the target language is spoken.

== Some notable alumni of the Faculty of Medieval and Modern Languages ==
Julian Barnes (French, Magdalen), novelist and essay-writer.

Fiona Bruce (French and Italian, Hertford), television journalist, newsreader and presenter.

Victoria Glendinning (Somerville), writer.

Brent Hoberman (New), co-founder of lastminute.com.

Bridget Kendall, MBE (Russian, Lady Margaret Hall and St Antony's). BBC Radio correspondent

Nigella Lawson (Lady Margaret Hall), chef and writer

John Le Carré (German, Lincoln), writer.

Gary O'Donoghue (Philosophy and Modern Languages, Christ Church), BBC journalist.

Daphne Park (Baroness Park of Monmouth), (Somerville) 'Queen of Spies'

Graham Robb (Exeter), biographer, historian, literary critic.

Dorothy L. Sayers (Classics and Modern Languages (French), Somerville), novelist

John Sturrock (French and Spanish), commissioning editor and journalist for the TLS and LRB.

Emma Walmsley (Classics and Modern Languages, Christ Church), CEO of GlaxoSmithKline

Marina Warner DBE, FRSL, FBA (French and Italian, Lady Margaret Hall), writer and cultural historian

Susie Dent (Modern Languages, Somerville), lexicographer, etymologist, author and presenter of Countdown and post-watershed spinoff 8 out of 10 Cats Does Countdown
