= Johannes Lähnemann =

German theologian and interreligious educator

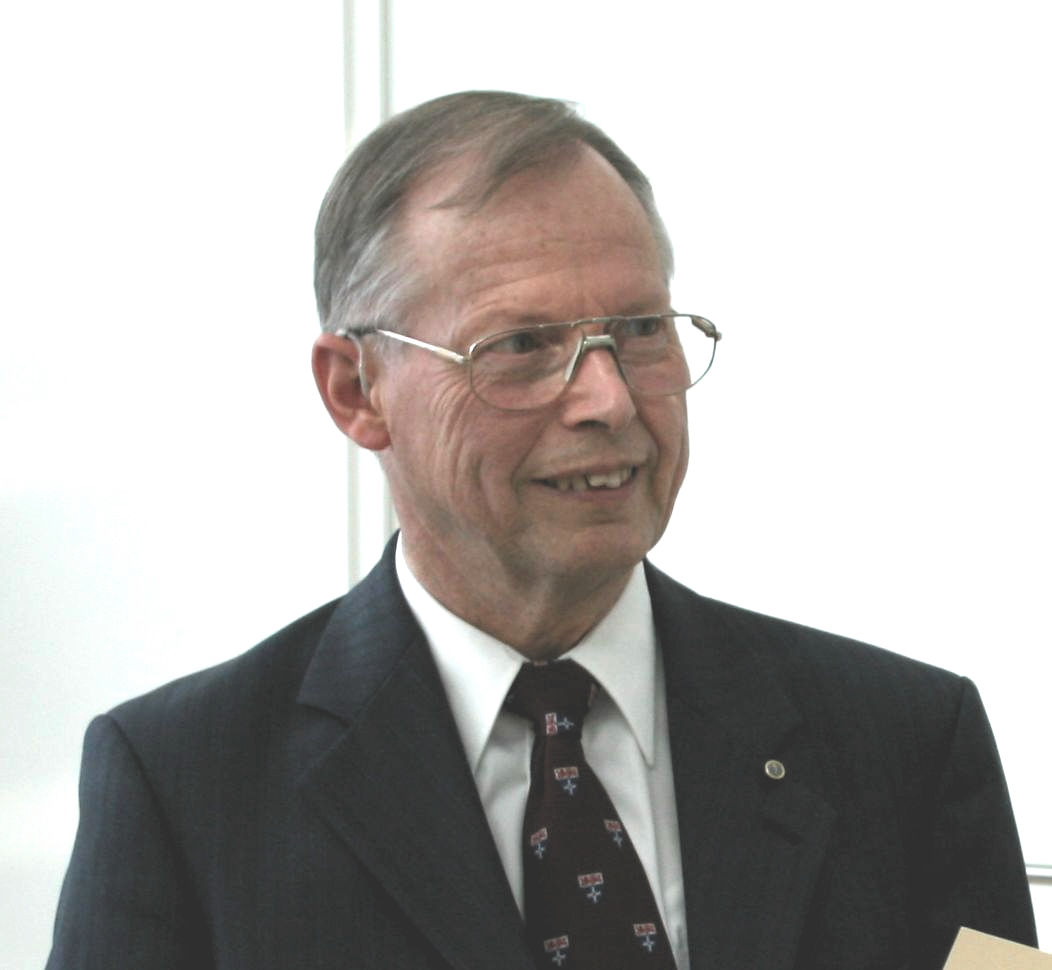
- Johannes Lähnemann at the award ceremony for the Federal Cross of Merit, Munich, 2008
- Born: June 15, 1941 (age 85); Schellerten
- Known for: pioneering interreligious education in Germany; contributions to Christian-Islamic dialogue
- Spouses: Susanne Dörner (m. 1967; died 2004); Sabine Schulz-Pillgram (m. 2008)
- Children: Henrike Lähnemann; Charlotte Flügel; Luise Westner

Academic background
- Education: University of Münster (Dr. theol., 1968); University of Bern (Habilitation, 1977)
- Thesis: Der Kolosserbrief: Komposition, Situation und Argumentation (1968)
- Doctoral advisor: Willi Marxsen

Academic work
- Discipline: theologian
- Sub-discipline: religious education; biblical studies; interfaith dialogue
- Main interests: interreligious education; peace education; world religions in the classroom; Christian–Islamic dialogue
- Website: Lehrstuhl für Religionspädagogik und Didaktik des evangelischen Religionsunterrichts

Johannes Lähnemann (born 15 June 1941, Schellerten) is a German Protestant theologian and professor of religious education.

== Life and career ==
Lähnemann studied Protestant theology in Bethel, Heidelberg, Vienna, and Münster and passed his 1st and 2nd theological exams in 1965/1969. In 1967 he married Susanne Lähnemann, née Dörner (1942–2004), daughter of Friedrich Karl Dörner and Eleonore Dörner, greatgreatgranddaughter of Albert Agathon Benary. His eldest daughter Henrike Lähnemann is a medievalist at the University of Oxford. She and the two younger daughters Charlotte Flügel (Director of the Kaulberg-Schule, Bamberg) and Luise Westner (actor and hospital clown, Berlin) each contributed an essay for his Festschrift. He gained his doctorate in the New Testament at the University of Münster in 1968 under Willi Marxsen with a thesis on the Epistle to the Colossians and was a research assistant in Münster from 1968 to 1973. From 1973 to 1980, he was Lecturer at the Pedagogical College (now Leuphana University) of Lüneburg. During his time there, he completed his habilitation in practical theology/religious education in Bern in 1977 with a thesis on world religions in the classroom. In 1981, he was appointed to the Chair of Religious Education and Didactics of Protestant Religious Education at University of Erlangen–Nuremberg, which he held until his retirement in 2007. In 2008, he married Sabine Lähnemann, née Schulz-Pillgram. He has lived in Goslar since 2010.

Lähnemann's work and research focusses on world religions in the classroom, interreligious learning and religions and peace education. In Nuremberg, together with his colleague Werner Haußmann, he initiated the Nuremberg Forums on Education for Cultural Encounters, which brought together theologians, religious scholars, educationalists, politicians and cultural workers. They took place every three years and were continued after his retirement together with his successor Manfred Pirner. Together with Hans Küng, he built up the educational work of the Global Ethic Foundation/Tübingen. Together with his colleagues Hartmut Bobzin and Mathias Rohe, he founded the Interdisciplinary Centre for Islamic Religious Education, one of the first German training centres for Islamic religious education teachers. Together with Klaus Hock and Wolfram Reiss, he carried out the research project 'The representation of Christianity in textbooks in Islamic countries'. In 2008, he was awarded the Order of Merit of the Federal Republic of Germany and the Mohammad Nafi Tschelebi Peace Award for services to Christian-Islamic dialogue.

Lähnemann acts as a consultant and expert on issues of interreligious dialogue and interreligious education at national and international level. From 1999 to 2019, he was Chairman of the Peace Education Standing Commission (PESC) of Religions for Peace (RfP), which documented interreligious peace education projects and brought them into dialogue with each other, as well as a board member of the German section of Religions for Peace (RfP) of which he wrote a history. He founded the Nuremberg group of Religions for Peace in 1988 and leading it until 2023. He is Deputy Managing Director of the Round Table of Religions in Germany and a member of the Standing Commission Interreligious Education of Religions for Peace International, which was established in 2020.

== Prizes and awards ==
- 2008: Order of Merit of the Federal Republic of Germany
- 2008: Mohammad Nafi Tschelebi Peace Award
- 2013: Höffmann Academic Prize for Intercultural Competence of the University of Vechta
- 2014: INTRA Project Prize for Complexity of Religions

== Publications ==
- Lähnemann, Johannes (2024). Interreligious and peace education in times of crisis: a history of Religions for Peace (PDF). Pädagogische Beiträge zur Kulturbegegnung. Berlin: EB-Verlag. ISBN 978-3-86893-483-0.
- Lähnemann, Johannes (2021). Interreligiöse Verständigung und Bildung 1980-2020: eine Bilanz im Spiegel der Nürnberger Foren zur Kulturbegegnung [Interreligious understanding and education, 1980–2020. An assessment in the light of the Nuremberg Forums for Cultural Encounter] (in German). Berlin: EB-Verlag. ISBN 978-3-86893-366-6.
- Lähnemann, Johannes (2020). Begegnung – Verständigung – Kooperation: Interreligiöse Arbeit vor Ort – Erfahrungen und Perspektiven aus Nürnberg [Encounter – understanding – cooperation. Interreligious work on site. Experiences and perspectives from Nuremberg] (in German). Gottingen: Vandenhoeck & Ruprecht. doi:10.14220/9783737011129. ISBN 978-3-8470-1112-5.
- Pirner, Manfred L.; Lähnemann, Johannes; Haussmann, Werner; Schwarz, Susanne, eds. (2019-01-23). Public theology: perspectives on religion and education. Routledge research in religion and education. New York: Routledge. doi:10.4324/9780429464973. ISBN 978-1-138-61266-2.
- Pirner, Manfred L.; Lähnemann, Johannes; Haussmann, Werner; Schwarz, Susanne, eds. (2018-06-14). Public theology, religious diversity, and interreligious learning: contributing to the common good through religious education. Routledge. doi:10.4324/9780429506390. ISBN 978-0-429-50639-0.
- Lähnemann, Johannes (2017). Lernen in der Begegnung: ein Leben auf dem Weg zur Interreligiosität [Learning in encounter: a life on the path to interreligiosity] (in German). Göttingen: Vandenhoeck & Ruprecht. doi:10.13109/9783666702426. ISBN 978-3-525-70242-0.
- Pirner, Manfred L.; Lähnemann, Johannes; Bielefeldt, Heiner, eds. (2016). Human rights and religion in educational contexts. Interdisciplinary studies in human rights. Vol. 1. Cham: Springer International Publishing. doi:10.1007/978-3-319-39351-3. ISBN 978-3-319-39350-6.
- Lähnemann, Johannes (2014). Spiritualität. Multireligiös: Begegnung der Religionen in Gebeten, Besinnungen, Liedern [Spirituality. multireligious. encounter of religions in prayers, reflections, song] (in German). Religions for Peace Deutschland. Berlin: EB-Verl. ISBN 978-3-86893-129-7.
- Pirner, Manfred L.; Lähnemann, Johannes, eds. (2013-04-24). Media power and religions: the challenge facing intercultural dialogue and learning. Frankfurt am Main: Peter Lang. doi:10.3726/978-3-653-02921-5. ISBN 978-3-653-02921-5.
- Pirner, Manfred L.; Lähnemann, Johannes; Haußmann, Werner, eds. (2011). Medien-Macht und Religionen: Herausforderung für interkulturelle Bildung. Referate und Ergebnisse des Nürnberger Forums 2010 [Media power and religions: the challenge facing intercultural education]. Pädagogische Beiträge zur Kulturbegegnung (in German). Berlin: EB-Verlag. ISBN 978-3-86893-046-7.
- Lähnemann, Johannes (2009). Liedpredigten. 2: Ich singe dir mit Herz und Mund [Hymn sermons, Vol. 2: I sing to you with heart and mouth] (in German). Nürnberg: Seubert. ISBN 978-3-926849-43-4.
- Lähnemann, Johannes (1996). Liedpredigten [Hymn sermons] (in German). Vol. 1. Nürnberg: Seubert. ISBN 978-3-926849-17-5.
- Lähnemann, Johannes; Schreiner, Peter, eds. (2009). Interreligious and values education in Europe: map and handbook (3 ed.). Münster: Comenius-Inst. ISBN 978-3-924804-85-5.
- Haußmann, Werner; Lähnemann, Johannes, eds. (2005). Dein Glaube – mein Glaube: interreligiöses Lernen in Schule und Gemeinde [Your faith – my faith: interreligious learning in school and community]. Theologie für Lehrerinnen und Lehrer Thema (in German). Göttingen: Vandenhoeck & Ruprecht. ISBN 978-3-525-61556-0.
- Lähnemann, Johannes, ed. (2001). Spiritualität und ethische Erziehung: Erbe und Herausforderung der Religionen: Referate und Ergebnisse des Nürnberger Forums 2000 [Spirituality and ethical education: heritage and challenge of religions]. Pädagogische Beiträge zur Kulturbegegnung (in German). Hamburg: EB-Verlag. ISBN 978-3-930826-71-1.
- Lähnemann, Johannes (1998). Evangelische Religionspädagogik in interreligiöser Perspektive [Protestant religious education in an interreligious perspective] (in German). Göttingen: Vandenhoeck & Ruprecht. ISBN 978-3-525-61134-0.
- Ambrosy, Markus; Schmidt, Günter R.; Grethlein, Christian; Lähnemann, Johannes, eds. (1996). Divinum et humanum – Günter R. Schmidt zum 60. Geburtstag: religions-pädagogische Herausforderungen in Vergangenheit und Gegenwart (in German). Frankfurt am Main: Lang. ISBN 978-3-631-30051-0.
- Lähnemann, Johannes, ed. (1995). "Das Projekt Weltethos" in der Erziehung: Referate und Ergebnisse des Nürnberger Forums 1994. Pädagogische Beiträge zur Kulturbegegnung (in German). Hamburg: EB-Verl. Rissen. ISBN 978-3-923002-86-3.
- Lähnemann, Johannes, ed. (1992). Das Wiedererwachen der Religionen als pädagogische Herausforderung: interreligiöse Erziehung im Spannungsfeld von Fundamentalismus und Säkularismus [The reawakening of religions as an educational challenge: interreligious education in the field of tension between fundamentalism and secularism]. Pädagogische Beiträge zur Kulturbegegnung (in German). Hamburg: EB-Verl. Rissen. ISBN 978-3-923002-62-7.
- Lähnemann, Johannes, ed. (1989). Weltreligionen und Friedenserziehung: Wege zur Toleranz; Schwerpunkt: Christentum – Islam; Referate und Ergebnisse des Nürnberger Forums 1988 [World religions and peace education: paths to tolerance]. Pädagogische Beiträge zur Kulturbegegnung (in German). Hamburg: EB-Verl. Rissen. ISBN 978-3-923002-47-4.
- Lähnemann, Johannes (1996). Weltreligionen im Unterricht. 2: Islam [World religions in the classroom. 2: Islam] (in German) (2 ed.). Göttingen: Vandenhoeck und Ruprecht. ISBN 978-3-525-61257-6.
- Lähnemann, Johannes (1994). Weltreligionen im Unterricht. 1: Fernöstliche Religionen [World religions in the classroom. 1: Far Eastern religions] (in German) (2 ed.). Göttingen: Vandenhoeck und Ruprecht. ISBN 978-3-525-61253-8.
- Lähnemann, Johannes, ed. (1986). Erziehung zur Kulturbegegnung: Modelle für das Zusammenleben von Menschen verschiedenen Glaubens. Schwerpunkt Christentum – Islam. Referate und Ergebnisse des Nürnberger Forums 1985 [Education for cultural encounter: models for the coexistence of people of different faiths. Focus on Christianity – Islam]. Pädagogische Beiträge zur Kulturbegegnung (in German). Hamburg: E.B.-Verl. Rissen. ISBN 978-3-923002-27-6.
- Lähnemann, Johannes, ed. (1983). Kulturbegegnung in Schule und Studium: Türken – Deutsche, Muslime – Christen; ein Symposion [Cultural encounter in school and study: Turks – Germans, Muslims – Christians; a symposium]. Erwachsenenbildung, Gemeindepädagogik, Allgemeine Sozialwissenschaften (in German). Hamburg: E. B. Verl. Rissen. ISBN 978-3-923002-08-5.
- Lähnemann, Johannes; Hahlbohm, Ursula (1981). Jesus Christus: erarbeitet auf Grund der Studienbriefe "Jesus von Nazareth/Christologie" der Evangelischen Arbeitsstelle Fernstudium für kirchliche Dienste Hannover. Studienbücher Religion (in German). Aarau: Sauerländer. ISBN 978-3-425-05174-1.
- Lähnemann, Johannes (1977). Nichtchristliche Religionen im Unterricht: Beiträge zu einer theologischen Didaktik der Weltreligionen, Schwerpunkt: Islam [Non-Christian religions in the classroom: contributions to a theological didactics of world religions, focus: Islam]. Handbücherei für den Religionsunterricht (in German). Gütersloh: Gütersloher Verl.-Haus Mohn. ISBN 978-3-579-04240-4.
- Lähnemann, Johannes; Böhm, Günter (1973). Der Philemonbrief: zur didaktischen Erschließung eines Paulusbriefes [The Epistle to Philemon: the didactic exploration of a Pauline epistle]. Handbücherei für den Religionsunterricht (in German). Gütersloh: Gütersloher Verl.-Haus Mohn. ISBN 978-3-579-04234-3.
- Lähnemann, Johannes (1971). Der Kolosserbrief: Komposition, Situation und Argumentation [The Epistle to the Colossians: composition, situation and argumentation]. Studien zum Neuen Testament (in German). Gütersloh: Gütersloher Verl.-Haus Mohn. ISBN 978-3-579-04057-8.
- Editor of the series Pädagogische Beiträge zur Kulturbegegnung [Pedagogical Contributions to Cultural Encounter] (32 volumes)

== Academic tributes ==
- Haußmann, Werner; Pirner, Manfred L., eds. (2018). Lieder als Lebensbegleiter: geistliche Impulse aus Vergangenheit und Gegenwart: Johannes Lähnemann zum 75. Geburtstag [Songs as companions in life: spiritual impulses from the past and present: Johannes Lähnemann on his 75th birthday] (in German). Berlin: EB-Verlag. ISBN 978-3-86893-277-5.
- Haußmann, Werner, ed. (2006). Handbuch Friedenserziehung: interreligiös, interkulturell, interkonfessionell [Handbook of peace education. interreligious – intercultural – interdenominational] (in German). Gütersloh: Gütersloher Verlagshaus. ISBN 978-3-579-05578-7. OCLC 77077705.
