= Lüne Abbey =

Coordinates: 53°15′37″N 10°25′20″E

Lüne Monastery
- Kloster Lune
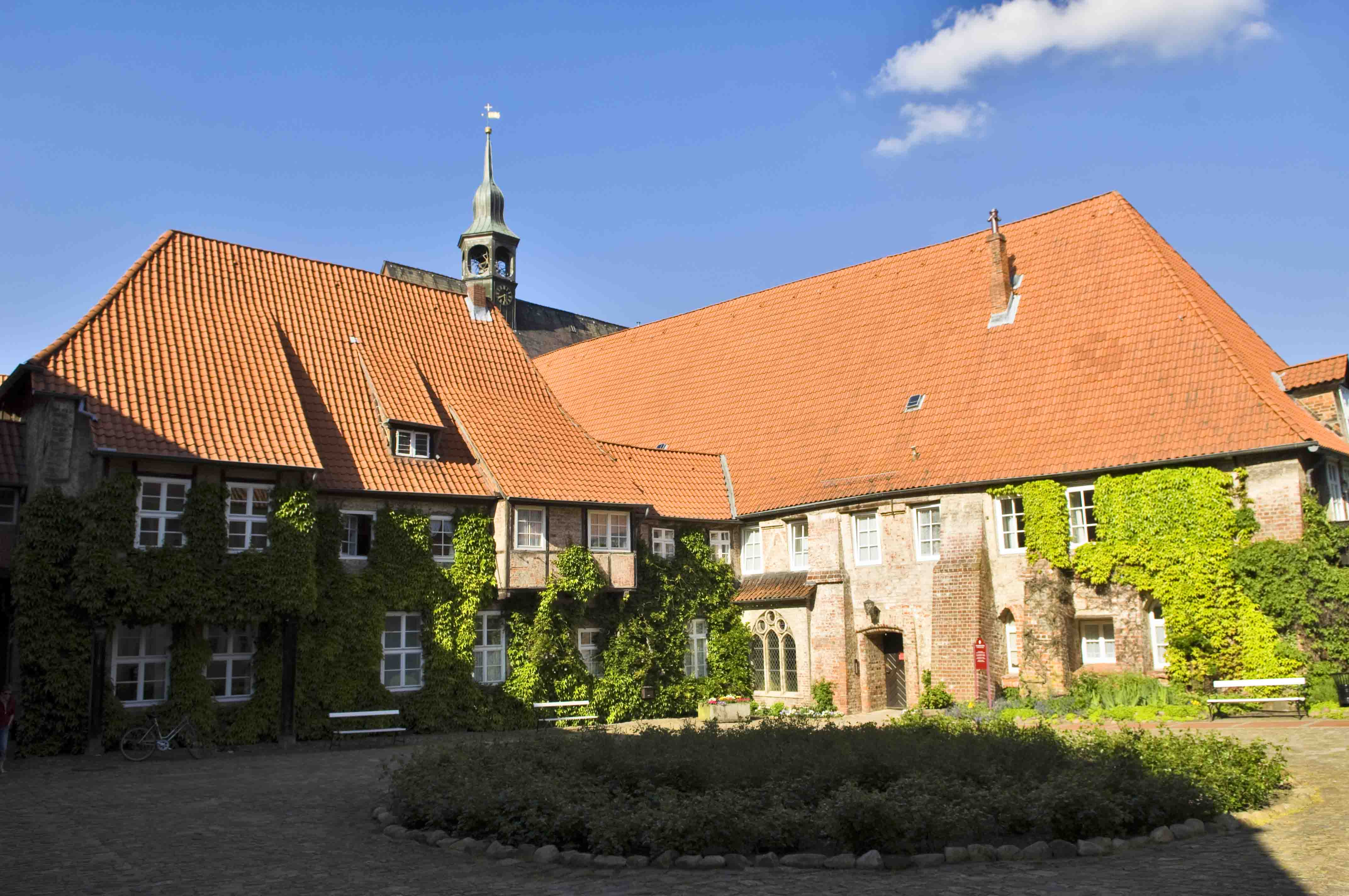

- Location of Lüne Abbey in Lower Saxony, Germany Lüne Monastery (Germany)
- Location: Lüneburg, Lower Saxony
- Country: Germany
- Denomination: Evangelical-Lutheran
- Previous denomination: Roman Catholic
- Website: www.kloster-luene.de

History
- Status: Convent
- Founded: 1172
- Founder: Hildeswidis von Marcboldestorpe
- Dedication: Bartholomew the Apostle

Architecture
- Functional status: active
- Heritage designation: Baudenkmal of Lower Saxony

Lüne Monastery (German: Kloster Lüne) is an Evangelical-Lutheran convent that is managed by the Klosterkammer Hannover (Hanover Monastic Chamber). The current abbess is Amélie Gräfin zu Dohna, her predecessor until 2022 was Reinhild Freifrau von der Goltz.

It was founded in 1172 as a Benedictine nunnery in the Lower Saxon town of Lüneburg. The convent soon established itself as a wealthy and autonomous local power in the Lüneburg Heath region. It recruited its nuns mostly from the influential patrician families of Lüneburg and accommodated up to 60 women over most of its existence. These women would be thoroughly educated in Latin, Liberal Arts and in Christian doctrine and liturgy. Over the course of the 15th and 16th centuries, the convent structure changed first through the monastic reform (1481), then through the Protestant Reformation.

== History ==
=== The convent as a Benedictine abbey ===
==== Foundation and early history ====
Lüne Abbey was founded in 1172 by a small community of no more than 10 noblewomen from Nordborstel. The group, led by Hildeswidis von Marcboldestorpe, was allowed to move into a vacant chapel that had been built as a hermitage for a monk from Lüneburg in 1140. The foundation charter was signed by Hugo, bishop of Verden, Henry the Lion, duke of Saxony and Bavaria, and Berthold II, abbott of the monastery St Michael in Lüneburg. The convent was dedicated to St Bartholomew and kept a part of the apostle's robe as the convent’s main relic. Although initially the convent did not follow any specific monastic rule, it adopted the Rule of Saint Benedict during the course of the 13th century. The original convent buildings burned down two times (in 1240 and in 1372) and were subsequently rebuilt closer to the city of Lüneburg.

Over the course of the 13th century, the convent grew steadily to a number of up to 60 nuns. They were mainly recruited from surrounding noble families and from the patrician families of Lüneburg. To cover the general living expenses, the convent relied first and foremost on the yearly income from the local saltworks that it held as a Pfandherr (pledge lord) since 1229. In 1367, the community had grown so influential and wealthy that it openly refused to accept its papally appointed provost Giles of Tusculum, a powerful cardinal bishop, and instead elected their own candidate, the lesser known Conrad of Soltau. In the end, both parties agreed on a third candidate, Johannes Weigergang, and Pope Urban V granted the nuns the privilege to elect their own provost. As premodern female convents had to rely on a male provost to represent the community's political and economical interests to the outside world, this privilege of free election implied the highest degree of autonomy the convent could obtain. In 1395, the Lüne provost was granted the full sacramental care of the nuns, so that the convent was now de facto autonomous, both politically and spiritually.

==== The Monastic Reform of 1481 ====
The 15th century brought with it a widespread desire for ecclesiastical reform, and the monastic orders were no exception. The reform movement (not to be confused with the Protestant Reformation) firmly established itself in Northern Germany in the early second half of the century. The emerging reform theologians viewed the rich and influential convents of the north as having diverted from the original, rightful teachings of Christianity, first and foremost the ideal of poverty, but also their interference in the temporal sphere and a decline in Latin education were criticised. For a long time, historians have adopted the latter claim unaudited, but whether or not and to what extends it was actually accurate has to be evaluated individually for each convent. In most examined cases, however, the production of Latin writing within the women's convents shows no sign of the alleged decline in education. Lüne Abbey agreed nonetheless to undergo reformative measures, and took in the provost and seven nuns from the nearby Ebstorf Abbey which had already undergone reforms, in 1481. The provost, Matthias von dem Knesebeck, deposed the prioress Bertha Hoyer and her subprioress, and installed his own candidate, the former Ebstorf nun Sophia von Bodenteich.

The reform included an enhanced curriculum in matters of Catholic doctrine, a changed liturgy in conformity with the reform, and a centralized and communal intake of daily meals to strengthen the convent's isolation from the outside world and to better control the required abstinence from meat on Fridays and during Lent. The latter arguably provided the greatest logistical difficulty, as both the kitchen and the refectory had to be rebuilt. Subsequently, the convent was incorporated into a dense network of reformed Northern German female convents and their male provosts, most of them committed reformers, which became a regional power within ecclesiastical politics.

=== Lüne Abbey and the Protestant Reformation ===
The territorial fragmentation of political sovereignty in Germany on the outset of the 16th century pushed the individual territorial lords ("Landesherren") into the position of the official decision-maker regarding the acceptance or rejection of the new Reformation process. The monastic convents had to fear for their survival, as the new movement set out to secularize and expropriate what they saw as an expression of the decadence and detachment from the faithful in the outside world. Lüne Abbey fell into the jurisdiction of the Duchy of Brunswick-Lüneburg which had been the main site of the Hildesheim Diocesan Feud in 1519. The convent suffered greatly under the joint raids of the princes of Brunswick-Wolfenbüttel and Calenberg, at some point even having to evacuate the convent building and move into the city of Lüneburg itself. The feud saw Brunswick-Lüneburg fall into major debt and its convents become weakened as a result. In 1525, as many German territories had to face peasant uprisings, Duke Ernest I tried to quickly consolidate his budget by sending a demand over 28,000 guilders to all convents in Brunswick-Lüneburg which he threatened to enforce by a military show of force, if necessary. It did not take long after that, however, for the duke to publicly declare his allegiance to the cause of the Reformation and thus target the Roman Catholic convents directly. The female convents of Brunswick-Lüneburg, tightly knit together since the monastic reform of 1481, staunchly opposed the duke's demands, and the situation effectively went into a standstill for the next four years. In 1529, Duke Ernest and his court decided to break up the monastic network by first targeting its male provosts. He hoped to replace them one by one with a Protestant preacher loyal only to the duke himself, as those provosts had once themselves deposed the old leadership of the convents without much opposition. Indeed, in late 1529, the Lüne provost Johannes Lorber resigned from his post and made way for a ducal administrator, Johannes Haselhorst, and a Protestant preacher, Hieronymous Enkhusen. In the following year, these measures were followed up by the inception of a new monastic policy which changed the liturgy within the convents drastically and nullified all monastic vows. The female communities were explicitly stated to be the new religious enemies. In 1531, one of the ducal tax collectors even went so far as to destroy one of the chapels of Lüne Abbey, consecrated to Saint Gangulphus of Burgundy. As prioress Mechthild von Wilde died in 1535, the nuns' opposition against the Reformation faltered altogether. Although the convent was able to independently elect a new prioress, Elisabeth Schneverding, they accepted their incorporation into the Protestant Landeshoheit of the duke. Duke Ernest, on the other hand, surprisingly accepted that the convent remained a secular foundation for unmarried Protestant women (Damenstift), and did not dissolve the institution as a whole. It took, however, until 1562, for the convent to elect its first decidedly Protestant head.

=== Lüne Abbey as a Damenstift ===
Over the course of the following two centuries, the community had a somewhat ambiguous status. Outwardly, it was treated as a purely secular retirement institution, but inwardly, the community still led a highly devoted spiritual life in Benedictine tradition. In 1711, this tension was resolved in an agreement between the convent and Duke George-Louis (later George I of Great Britain) in favour of the secular role that came to dominate also within the convent walls. Lüne Abbey would find itself as part of a war zone two more times. In 1793, a French army marched through nearby territory during the First Coalition War in which the Electorate of Hanover took part on the side of the anti-French coalition. The abbess, Artemisia von Bock, anticipated an upcoming occupation of the convent and quickly sold a large stock of artworks, manuscripts and books from the library, some into private hands, some into the care of larger archives and depositories nearby. During World War II many of those archives fell victim to Allied bombing raids, and many more artworks and manuscripts vanished within the turmoils near the end of the war when German administrative structures collapsed and effectively ceased to exist.

== Historical milieu ==
As new women entered the convent, they did not break off contact to their biological families. In that sense, the nuns lived in a double family, as they were indissolubly linked both to their biological family and their newfound sisters in the convent. Their regular and unbroken contact to relatives in the outside world is documented in a number of letters, especially from the 15th and 16th centuries. The familial connections between the nuns and the Lüneburg patrician families are widely reconstructed and show a deep link between the convent and the city politics. Further connections could arise between the convent and other estates that a new provost held beside Lüne Abbey.

== Literacy and education ==
Poster presentation for the Nuns Network Project

The extant amounts of manuscripts originating within the convent walls suggest a thorough education of the nuns in the Latin, Liberal Arts and theology. The educational standard was not limited to the convent leaders, but extended to every novice entering the abbey, provided by the convent's own monastic school. For the nuns, the central purpose of education was the rightful execution of the liturgy which had to be sung in Latin. In their letters, they styled themselves as Brides of Christ, dedicating their life to serve God as spouses in the vineyard of the convent. Their personal and business correspondence only recently has been brought back to the attention.

Letters between the convent and their secular contacts, such as the city of Lüneburg or their estates, were written in Middle Low German which was the economic lingua franca within Northern Germany and around the North Sea and the Baltic Sea as the main operating areas of the Hanseatic League. Codeswitching between Latin and Middle Low German was used, mainly in the correspondence between the convents.

== Architecture ==
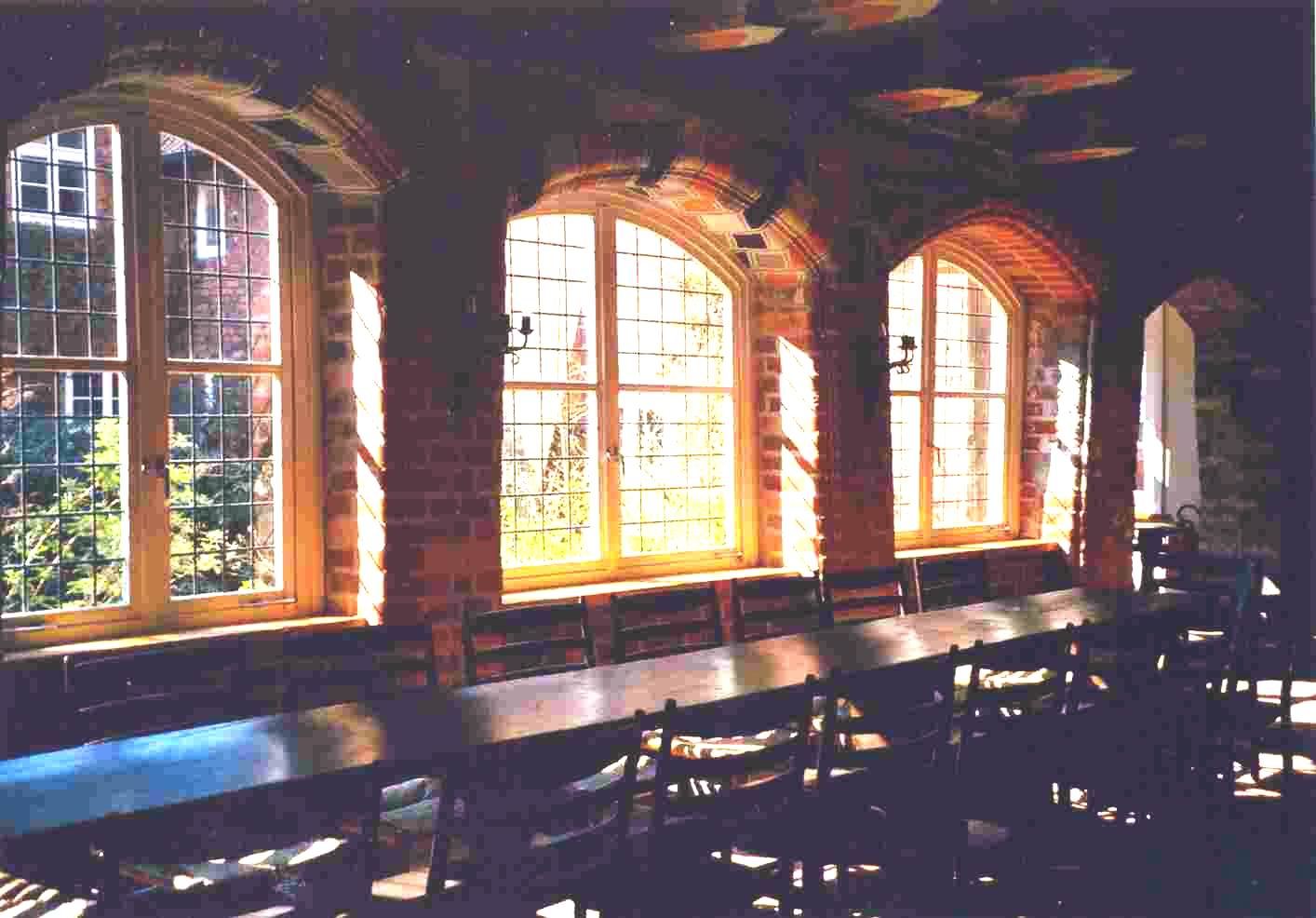
Summer refectory (Remter) at Lüne Abbey, restored in 16th century style

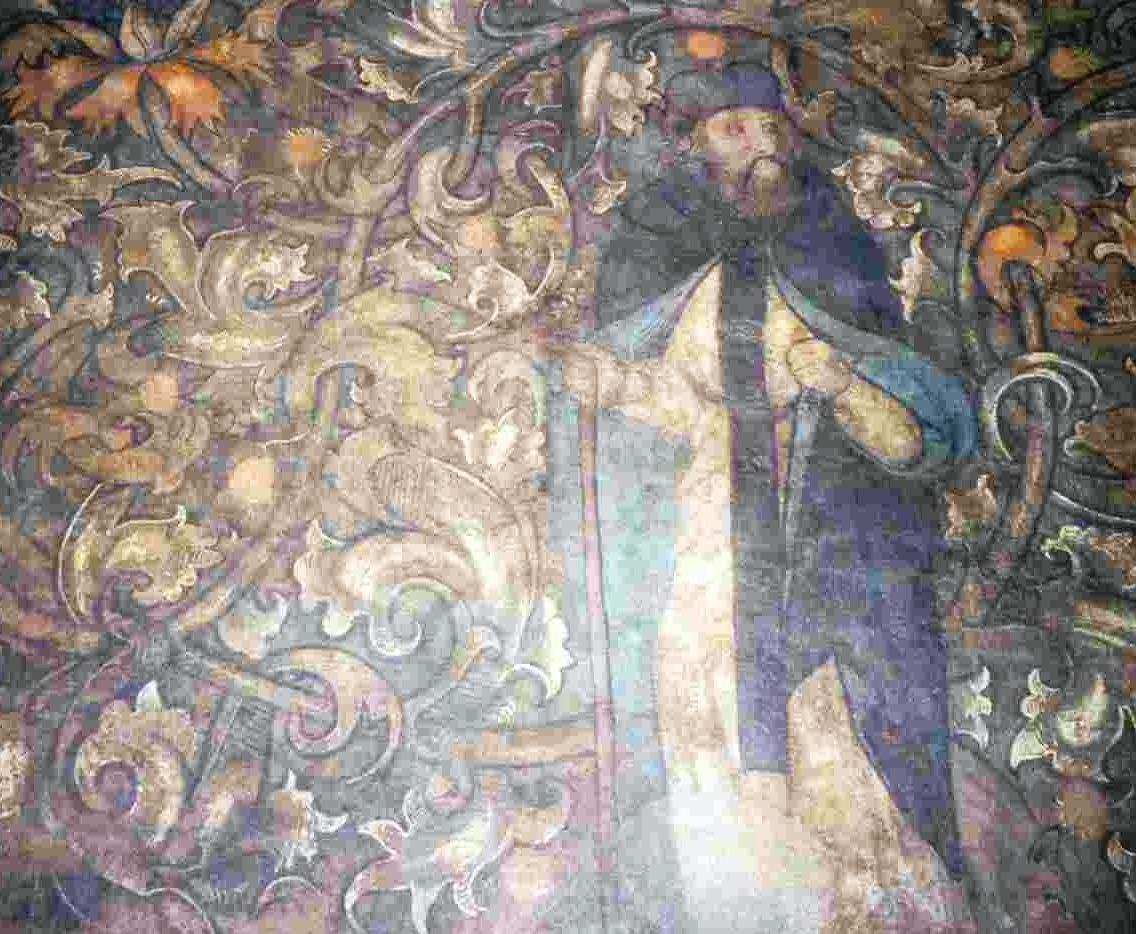
Wall painting on the east wall of the refectory dating to 1500

In 1380 the convent was rebuilt in the Brick Gothic style after a major fire. The cloisters, the single-nave church of 1412 and the Nonnenchor (nuns' choir) are well preserved, the same is true of the former Dormitorium (dormitory).

== Art ==
Lüne is famous for its knitting and embroidery (wool on linen). Valuable pieces (white embroidery (Weißstickerei) altar cloths, fasting cloths (Fastentücher) and carpets, the oldest dating to around 1250) are displayed in the textile museum in the grounds of the monastery opened in 1995. In the church on the altar in the Nonnenchor is a painting from the workshop of Lucas Cranach the Elder. The high altar's triptych (carved altar) was made in the early 16th century. Also worthy of mention are the wall paintings from around 1500 in the refectory of the monastery.

== Scholarly reception ==
Unsurprisingly, most of the historiographic literature on Lüne Abbey is written in German. Only the most recent edition project, a cooperation between the universities of Oxford and Düsseldorf on the convent's letter collections, has opened up the opportunity of a more widespread reception of the Lower German women's convents within the Anglosphere. Nonetheless, the amount of English literature currently available remains all but non-existent.

== List of heads of convent ==
List of provosts
Name	From	Until
Burchardt	1197?	1197?
Otto	1202?	1213?
Thietwig	1231?	1231?
Conrad	1241?	1255?
Werner von Dören	1263?	1264?
Heinrich von der Sülte	1273?	1278?
Alward	1282?	1288
Christian	1288	1308
Johannes Schinkel	1309	1317
Gerlach von Stade	1318	1339
Heinrich von Langlingen	1341	1369
Conrad von Soltau	1369	1370
Egidius von Tusculum	1373	1373
Johannes Weigergang	1374	1412
Heinrich Bodenstedt	1412	1433
Cord von Tzerstede	1433	1440
Dietrich Schaper	1440	1451
Lüder Lerte	1451	1457
Dietrich Schaper	1457	1457
Nikolaus Graurock	1457	1470
Otto Vulle	1470	1471
Nikolaus Graurock	1471	1493
Nikolaus Schomaker	1494	1506
Johannes Lorber	1506	1529
Johann Haselhorst in Winsen (ducal bailiff)	1529	1535

List of prioresses (until 1562)
Name	From	Until
Hildeswidis von Marcboldestorpe	1172	?
Gertrudis	1231?	1231?
Oldegardis	1284?	1289?
Ghisla	1299?	1315?
Elisabeth	1318?	1329
Lutgarda	1330	1337?
Gertrudis	1339?	1339?
Alheyd von Barfelde	1341?	1346?
Ghyseltrudis Willeri	1349?	1357?
Richza	1362?	1369
Mechtildis	1370	1370?
Wicburgis	1374?	1374
Kunegundis	1375	1375?
Mechtildis von Oedeme	1397?	1415
Drude Semmelbecker	1415	1422?
Helena von Meding	1436?	1446?
Gebeke Möller	1448?	1450
Gertrudis Schomaker	1450	1450
Susanne Münter	1451	1451?
Mette von dem Berge	1458?	1468
Berta Hoyer	1468	1481
Sophia von Bodenteich	1481	1504
Mechtild Wilde	1504	1535
Elisabeth Schneverding	1535	1540
Katharina Semmelbecker	1540	1562

List of Protestant abbesses (since 1562)
Name	From	Until
Anna Marenholtz	1562	1580
Dorothea von Meding	1580	1634
Katharina Margaretha von Estorff	1634	1659
Dorothea Elisabeth von Meding	1659	1672
Dorothea Maria von Estorff	1672	1680
Margaretha Elisabeth von Harling	1680	1685
Barbara von Wittorf	1685	1713
Anna Dorothea von Estorff	1713	1729
Eleonore Margaretha von Harling	1729	1759
Barbara Sophia von Estorff	1759	1790
Eleonore Artemisia Friederike von Bock von Wülfingen	1790	1798
Caroline von der Wense	1799	1838
Wilhelmine von Meding	1838	1844
Friederike von Meding	1844	1893
Dorothee Marie von der Decken	1893	1927
Emilie Elisabeth von Möller	1927	1944
Marie Agnes von Reden	1944	1970
Ilse Erna Margarethe Segler	1970	1976
Liesel Sofie Gössling	1976	2000
Barbara Taglang	2000	2006
Renate Krüger	2006	2008
Reinhild Freifrau von der Goltz, née von dem Knesebeck-Milendonck	2008	2023
Amélie Gräfin zu Dohna	2023	incumbent

== Bibliography ==
- Böker, Doris; Winghart, Stefan, eds. (2010). Baudenkmale in Niedersachsen. Vol. 22.1: Hansestadt Lüneburg: mit Kloster Lüne (Denkmaltopographie Bundesrepublik Deutschland). Petersberg: Michael Imhof Verlag.
- Brandis, Wolfgang (2017). "Zur Reformationsgeschichte der Lüneburger Frauenklöster’". In: Jochen Meiners (ed.).Zeichen setzen: 500 Jahre Reformation in Celle. Begleitband zur gleichnamigen Ausstellung im Bomann-Museum Celle, im Residenzmuseum im Celler Schloss und in der Stadtkirche St. Marien. Petersberg: Michael Imhof Verlag, 38-53.
- Dolle, Josef; Knochenhauer, Dennis, eds. (2012). Niedersächsisches Klosterbuch. Verzeichnis der Klöster, Stifte, Kommenden und Beginenhäuser in Niedersachsen und Bremen von den Anfängen bis 1810. 4 vols. Bielefeld: Verlag für Regionalgeschichte.
- Faust, Ulrich, ed. (1984). Germania Benedictina. Vol. 11: Die Frauenklöster in Niedersachsen, Schleswig-Holstein und Bremen. St. Ottilien: Eos.
- Grotefend, Carl Ludwig (1872). "Der Einfluß der Windesheimer Congregation auf die Reformation niedersächsischer Klöster". Zeitschrift des historischen Vereins für Niedersachsen. 1872: 73-88.
- Hamburger, Jeffrey; Schlotheuber, Eva; Marti, Susan; Fassler, Margot (2017). Liturgical Life and Latin Learning at Paradies bei Soest, 1300-1425: Inscription and Illumination in the Choir Books of a North German Dominican Convent, Münster: Aschendorff Verlag.
- Lähnemann, Henrike; Schlotheuber, Eva; Schultz-Balluf, Simone; Wareham, Edmund; Trettin, Philipp; Vosding, Lena; Stenzig, Philipp, eds. (2016–). Netzwerke der Nonnen. Edition und Erschließung der Briefsammlung aus Kloster Lüne (ca. 1460–1555). Wolfenbüttel: Wolfenbütteler Digitale Editionen. online
- Lähnemann, Henrike (2016). "Der Medinger 'Nonnenkrieg' aus der Perspektive der Klosterreform. Geistliche Selbstbehauptung 1479–1554". In: Kees Scheepers et al. (eds.). 1517-1545: The northern experience. Mysticism, art and devotion between Late Medieval and Early Modern. Antwerp Conference 2011. Ons Geestelijk Erf. 87: 91–116.
- Nolte, Ernst (1932). Quellen und Studien zur Geschichte des Nonnenklosters Lüne bei Lüneburg. Vol. 1: Die Quellen. Die Geschichte Lünes von den Anfängen bis zur Klostererneuerung im Jahre 1481 (Studien zur Kirchengeschichte Niedersachsens 6). Göttingen: Vandenhoeck & Ruprecht.
- Schlotheuber, Eva (2019). "Doctrina privata und doctrina publica – Überlegungen zu den mittelal-terlichen Frauenklöstern als Wissens- und Bildungsraum". In: Gert Melville (ed.). Die Wirkmacht klösterlichen Lebens im Mittelalter. Modelle – Ordnungen – Kompetenzen – Konzepte (Klöster als Innovationslabore. Studien und Texte 7). Regensburg: Pustet.
- Schmidt, Heinrich (1984). "Kirchenregiment und Landesherrschaft im Selbstverständnis niedersächsischer Fürsten des 16. Jahrhunderts". Niedersächsisches Jahrbuch für Landesgeschichte. 56: 31–58.
- Tamcke, Martin (1997). Die reformatischen Impulse zu Bildung und Glaube bei Herzog Ernst und im Uelzen seiner Zeit (Weiße Reihe 6). Uelzen: Becker.
- Urbanus Rhegius (1955). "Radtslach to nodtroft der kloster des förstendoms Lüneboch, Gades wort unde ceremonien belangen". EKO. 6 (1): 586–608.
- Van den Heuvel, Christine; Boetticher, Martin von (1998). Geschichte Niedersachsens. Vol. 3 (1): Politik, Wirtschaft und Gesellschaft von der Reformation bis zum Beginn des 19. Jahrhunderts, Hannover: Hahnsche Buchhandlung.
- Vosding, Lena (2018). "Gifts from the convent. The letters of the Benedictine Nuns at Lüne as the material manifestation of spiritual care". In: Marie Isabel Matthews-Schlinzig; Caroline Socha (eds.). Was ist ein Brief? Aufsätze zu epistolarer Theorie und Kultur/What is a letter? Essays on epistolary theory and culture. Würzburg: Königshausen & Neumann, 211–233.
- Wehking, Sabine (2009). Die Inschriften der Lüneburger Klöster. Ebstorf, Isenhagen, Lüne, Medingen, Walsrode, Wienhausen (Die Deutschen Inschriften 76). Wiesbaden: Reichert. (Online open access on inschriften.net)
- Witzendorff, Hans-Jürgen von (1952). Stammtafeln Lüneburger Patriziergeschlechter. Göttingen: Reise.
- Wolgast, Eike (2017). "Reformation von oben. Die Etablierung einer evangelischen Obrigkeit 1526–1580". In: Wartburg Foundation (ed.). Luther und die Deutschen: Begleitband zur Nationalen Sonderausstellung auf der Wartburg, 4. Mai – 5. November 2017. Petersberg: Michael Imhof Verlag, 38–43.

== Hyperlinks ==
- Website of the convent
- Digital edition of the letter collections of Lüne Abbey, a cooperation between the University of Oxford, the University of Düsseldorf and the Herzog August Library Wolfenbüttel
- Conference paper on the letter collection of Lüne Abbey by Professor Henrike Lähnemann, Dr Edmund Wareham and Konstantin Winters, in English (see the link to Youtube on that page)
- Inscriptions and pictures of Lüne Abbey, in German (Wehking, Inschriften (2009))
