= Jim Reed (academic) =

British Germanist

Terence James Reed, FBA (born 1937), known professionally as Jim Reed, is a scholar of German literature. He was Taylor Professor of the German Language and Literature at the University of Oxford from 1989 to 2004.

Born in 1937, Reed completed his undergraduate studies at Brasenose College, Oxford, where he was also a junior research fellow from 1961 to 1963. In 1963, he was elected to a fellowship at St John's College, Oxford, where he remained until taking up the Taylor Chair of the German Language and Literature at the University of Oxford in 1989 (whereupon he was elected to a fellowship at The Queen's College, Oxford). He retired in 2004.

In 1987, Reed was elected a Fellow of the British Academy, the United Kingdom's national academy for the humanities. He received the research prize of the Humboldt Foundation in 2002 and the Gold Medal of the Goethe Society in 1999, and was awarded an honorary doctorate by the University of Freiburg in 2010. In 2004, volume 33 of the Oxford German Studies, edited by Tom Kuhn, was offered as a tribute to Reed and is a Festschrift marking his retirement.

== Publications ==
- Thomas Mann: The Uses of Tradition (Clarendon Press, 1974; 2nd ed., 1996).
- The Classical Centre: Goethe and Weimar (Croom Helm, 1979).
- Goethe (Oxford University Press, 1984).
- Schiller (Oxford University Press, 1991).
- In German: Mehr Licht in Deutschland - Eine kleine Geschichte der Aufklärung (C.H. Beck Verlag, 2009) ISBN 978-3-406-59304-8

Additionally, Reed's Bithell Memorial Lecture for 1994 was "Genesis: Some Episodes in Literary Creation".
