= Eva Schlotheuber =

German medievalist

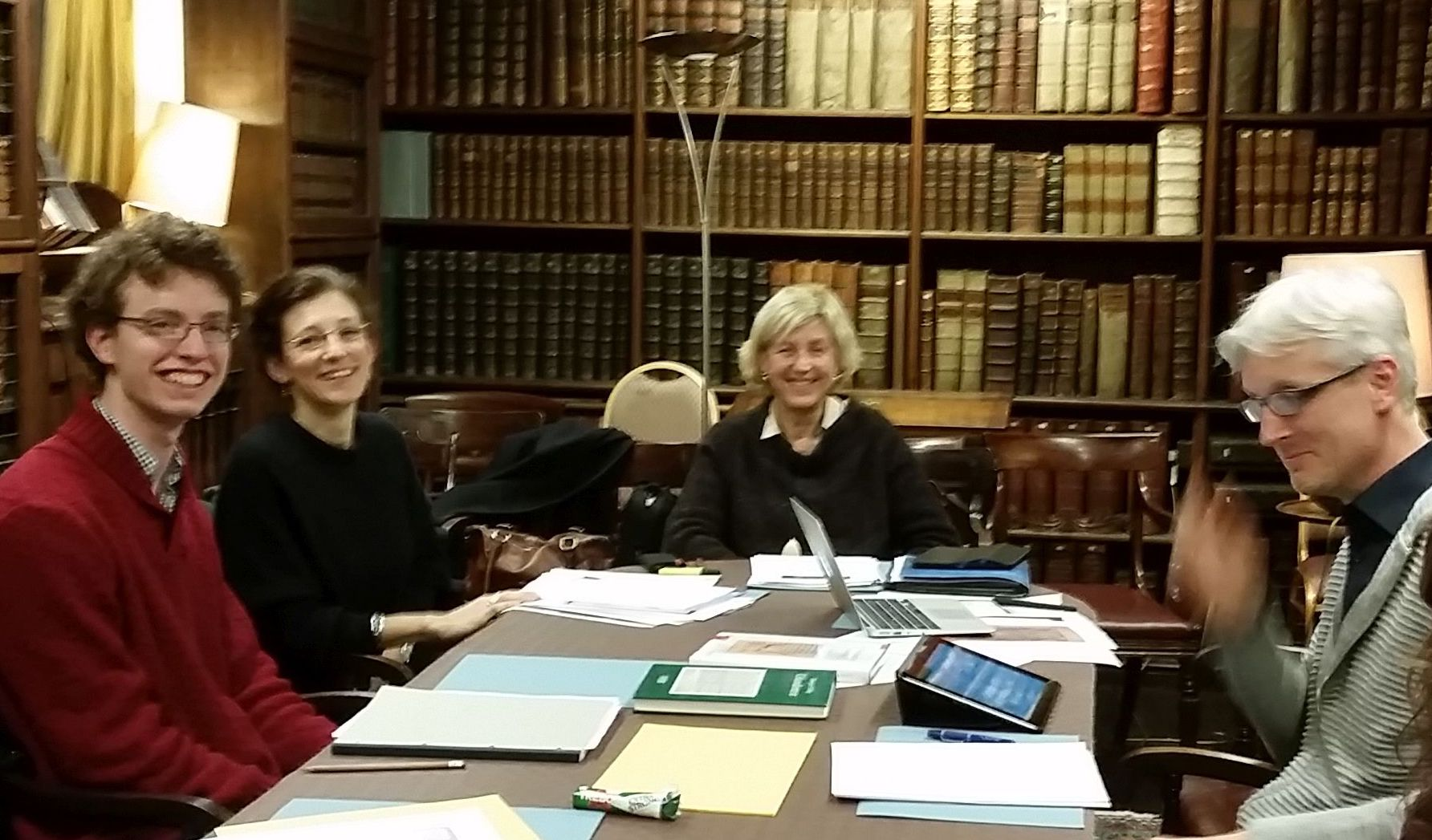
Meeting of the editing team for the Lüne letters project in the Old Library, St Edmund Hall, University of Oxford (from left to right: Edmund Wareham, Lena Vosding, Eva Schlotheuber, Torsten Schaßan)

Eva Schlotheuber (born 25 October 1959 in Osnabrück) is a German historian of Christianity in the Middle Ages.

== Education and career ==
Eva Schlotheuber studied at the University of Göttingen and the University of Copenhagen. In 1994, she received her doctorate in Göttingen with a dissertation entitled Die Franziskaner in Göttingen. Die Geschichte des Klosters und seiner Bibliothek (The Franciscans in Göttingen. The history of the monastery and its library), supervised by Hartmut Hoffmann. From 1999 to 2001, she was a research assistant to Claudia Märtl at the Technical University of Braunschweig, and then in 2001 at LMU Munich. In 2003, she completed her habilitation there with a thesis on the life of nuns in the late Middle Ages.

In 2003, she was senior assistant at the LMU Munich and held professorships at TU Braunschweig and Marburg University. From 2007 to 2010, Schlotheuber taught as professor of Medieval History and auxiliary sciences at the University of Münster. Since 2010 she holds the Chair of Medieval History at the Heinrich Heine University Düsseldorf as successor to Johannes Laudage.

Since 2014, she has been a full member of the Zentraldirektion (central management) of the Monumenta Germaniae Historica and since 2016 a member of the Konstanzer Arbeitskreis für Mittelalterliche Geschichte. Since the 51st Deutscher Historikertag (Biennial Convention of German Historians) in Hamburg in 2016, she has been President of the German Historical Association.

In 2020, she was elected to the American Philosophical Society.

== Research ==
Her research focuses on the history of education and libraries, cultural history, the history of religious orders, especially forms of life and expression in the medieval nunneries as well as the material culture of the Middle Ages, the portrayal of personality in the biographical and autobiographical literature of the High and Late Middle Ages and the conception of Emperor Charles IV's rule as well as the political structures and cultural currents of the 14th century. In autumn 2017, Schlotheuber and Sigrid Hirbodian organized a Reichenau conference of the Konstanzer Arbeitskreises für mittelalterliche Geschichte with the theme Zwischen Klausur und Welt. Autonomie und Interaktion spätmittelalterlicher geistlicher Frauengemeinschaften (Between enclosure and the outside. Autonomy and Interaction of Late Medieval Spiritual Women's Communities). Since 2016, she is director (with Henrike Lähnemann) on a Gerda Henkel Stiftung funded project "The Nuns' Network" to edit the letter books from Lüne Abbey, the largest medieval corpus of letters written by women.

== Publications ==
=== Monographies ===
- together with Jeffrey Hamburger, Margot Fassler, Susan Marti: Liturgical Life and Latin Learning at Paradies bei Soest, 1300–1425. Inscription and Illumination in the Choir Books of a North German Dominican Convent. 2 vols., Aschendorff, Münster 2017, ISBN 978-3-402-13072-8.
- together with Patrizia Carmassi and Almut Breitenbach: Schriftkultur und religiöse Zentren im norddeutschen Raum Wolfenbütteler Mittelalter-Studien 24. Wiesbaden: Harrassowitz, 2014.
- Klostereintritt und Bildung. Die Lebenswelt der Nonnen im späten Mittelalter. Mit einer Edition des 'Konventstagebuchs' einer Zisterzienserin von Heilig-Kreuz bei Braunschweig (1484–1507). Mohr Siebeck, Tübingen 2004, ISBN 3-16-148263-8.
- Die Franziskaner in Göttingen. Die Geschichte des Klosters und seiner Bibliothek. Dietrich-Coelde-Verlag, Werl 1996, ISBN 3-87163-222-8.

=== As editor ===
- together with Jeffrey Hamburger: The Liber ordinarius of Nivelles. Liturgy as Interdisciplinary Intersection (Spätmittelalter, Humanismus, Reformation 111). Mohr Siebeck, Tübingen 2020, ISBN 978-3-16-158242-4.
- together with Hubertus Seibert: Soziale Bindungen und gesellschaftliche Strukturen im späten Mittelalter (14.–16. Jahrhundert). Vandenhoeck & Ruprecht, Göttingen 2013, ISBN 978-3-525-37304-0.
- together with Hubertus Seibert: Böhmen und das Deutsche Reich. Ideen- und Kulturtransfer im Vergleich (13.–16. Jahrhundert). München 2009, ISBN 978-3-486-59147-7
- Nonnen, Kanonissen und Mystikerinnen. Religiöse Frauengemeinschaften in Süddeutschland. Beiträge zur interdisziplinären Tagung vom 21. bis 23. September 2005 in Frauenchiemsee. Vandenhoeck & Ruprecht, Göttingen 2008, ISBN 978-3-525-35891-7.

=== Digital projects ===
- together with Henrike Lähnemann, Simone Schultz-Balluff, Edmund Wareham, Philipp Trettin, Lena Vosding und Philipp Stenzig: Netzwerke der Nonnen. Edition und Erschließung der Briefsammlung aus Kloster Lüne (ca. 1460–1555). In: Wolfenbütteler Digitale Editionen. Wolfenbüttel 2016–, online.
