= Professor of Medieval German (Oxford) =

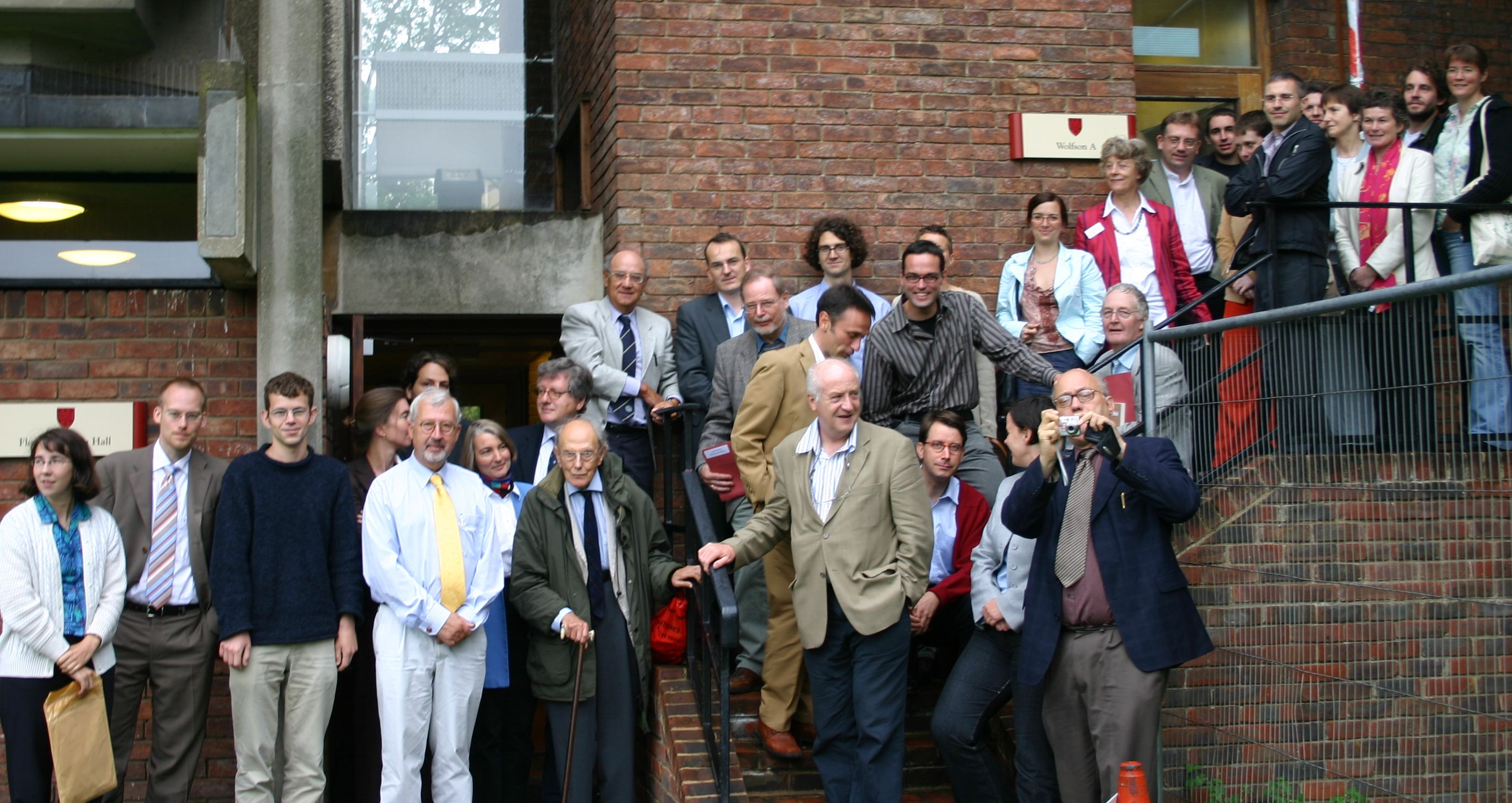
All three chairholders, Peter Ganz (centre), Nigel F. Palmer (with camera at the right) and Henrike Lähnemann (photographer), during the Anglo-German Colloquium 2005

The Professorship of Medieval German is one of the permanent chairs at the University of Oxford. It was established in 1972 for the germanist Peter Ganz. It is associated with a fellowship at St Edmund Hall and belongs to the Faculty of Medieval and Modern Languages.

The position is currently co-funded by contributions from the German Academic Exchange Service, the Volkswagen Foundation, and University of Freiburg, and associated with an annual residency at the Freiburg Institute for Advanced Studies. More information on the history of the Chair in the Inaugural Lecture by Henrike Lähnemann and in the contributions to Peter Ganz at 100, the centenary celebrations for the first holder of the Chair.

== List of Professors of Medieval German ==
The people to have held the position are:

- Peter Ganz 1972–1985
- Nigel F. Palmer 1985–2012
- Henrike Lähnemann 2015–present
