= Stevenson Professor of Hispanic Studies =

Named chair at the University of Glasgow

The Stevenson Professorship of Hispanic Studies is a named chair at the University of Glasgow. It was established as the Stevenson Professorship of Spanish in 1924 and endowed by a donation from Sir Daniel Macaulay Stevenson. Its name was altered to the current form in 1959.

== List of professors ==
- 1925–1932: William James Entwistle, FBA.
- 1932–1972: William Christopher Atkinson
- 1972–1994: Nicholas Grenville Round
- 1995–1999: David Gareth Walters
- 1999–2013: Vacant
