= Friedrich Traugott Friedemann =

German educator, philologist and archivist

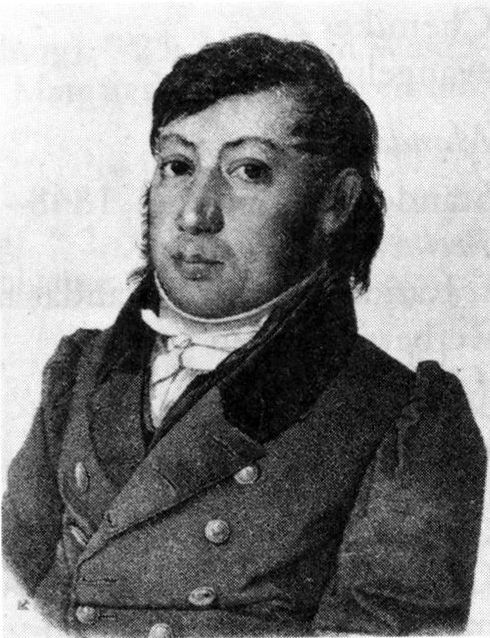
Friedrich Traugott Friedemann (1793–1853)

Friedrich Traugott Friedemann (31 March 1793, Stolpen – 2 May 1853, Idstein) was a German educator, philologist and archivist.

== Biography ==
He studied theology and philology at the University of Wittenberg, where he was a pupil of Christian Lobeck. In 1812 he received his PhD and during the following year was named conrector at the gymnasium in Zwickau. Later on, he took the same position at the gymnasium in Wittenberg, where in 1820 he attained the title of rector. In 1823 he was appointed director of the Katharineum school in Braunschweig and in 1828 became director of the gymnasium at Weilburg.

In 1840 he was appointed head of the Nassau Central Archives in Idstein. In 1846 he founded the journal Zeitschrift für die Archive Deutschlands.

== Selected works ==
- "De versu graecorum heroico, maxime Homerico", 1816 (with Franz Ernst Heinrich Spitzner).
- Praktische anleitung zur kenntniss und verfertigung lateinischer verse, 1828.
- "Dav. Ruhnkenii orationes: dissertationes et epistolae", 1828 (editor) – David Ruhnken's oratories, dissertations and epistles.
- Beiträge zur vermittelung widerstrebender ansichten über verfassung und verwaltung deutscher gymnasien, 1832.
- Chrestomathie aus römischen Dichtern für mittlere Gymnasialclassen, 1836.
- Christlich-religiöse Anregungen für Studirende Jünglinge auf Gymnasien und Universitäten, 1837.
- "Scriptorum Latinorum Saeculi XIX. Delectus", 1840.
