= Peter Ganz =

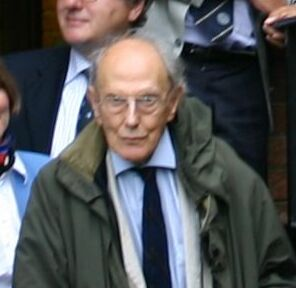
- Professor Ganz in 2005
- Born: Peter Felix Ganz; 3 November 1920; Mainz, Germany
- Died: 17 August 2006 (aged 85); Oxford, England
- Spouses: Rosemary Allen (m. 1949; died 1986) Nicolette Mout (m. 1987)
- Children: 4

Academic work
- Discipline: Germanist
- Institutions: Royal Holloway College, University of London; Westfield College, University of London; Hertford College, Oxford; St Edmund Hall, Oxford; Faculty of Medieval and Modern Languages, University of Oxford

Peter Felix Ganz (3 November 1920 – 17 August 2006) was a German-born Germanist who emigrated to Britain in 1938, translated conversations of German nuclear scientists during Operation Epsilon in 1945, and became a professor at the University of Oxford.

== Early life and education ==
Peter Ganz was the son of Dr. Hermann Friedrich Ignaz Ganz and Dr. Charlotte (Lotte), née Fromberg. His younger brother, then Ludwig Hermann Ganz, was the historian of Africa Lewis H Gann. Ganz attended the Realgymnasium in Mainz but was forced to leave it since his family was classed as Jewish. In November 1938, he was held for six weeks in the concentration camp at Buchenwald but was then able to emigrate to England. After internment on the Isle of Man, he joined the Royal Pioneer Corps, then worked for the Combined Services Detailed Interrogation Centre (CSDIC) with Fritz Lustig.

== Career ==
At the end of the war he worked at Farm Hall listening to the reactions of captured nuclear scientists including Heisenberg, Otto Hahn and others after the atomic bomb was dropped on Hiroshima.

From 1948 to 1949 Ganz worked as assistant lecturer at Royal Holloway College, London and from 1949–60 as Lecturer in German Philology and Medieval Literature at Westfield College, London. From 1963 to 1972 he was a Fellow at Hertford College, Oxford, Professor of Medieval German Language and Literature and Fellow of St Edmund Hall, Oxford from 1972 to 1985 where his successor (until 2012) was Nigel F Palmer.

He was a Resident Fellow at the Herzog August Library, Wolfenbüttel from 1985 to 1988. He co-founded the Anglo-German Colloquium, a biennial meeting of British and German medieval Germanists, and edited the Oxford German Studies from 1978 to 1990 and the Pauls und Braunes Beiträge from 1976 to 1990.

== Personal life ==
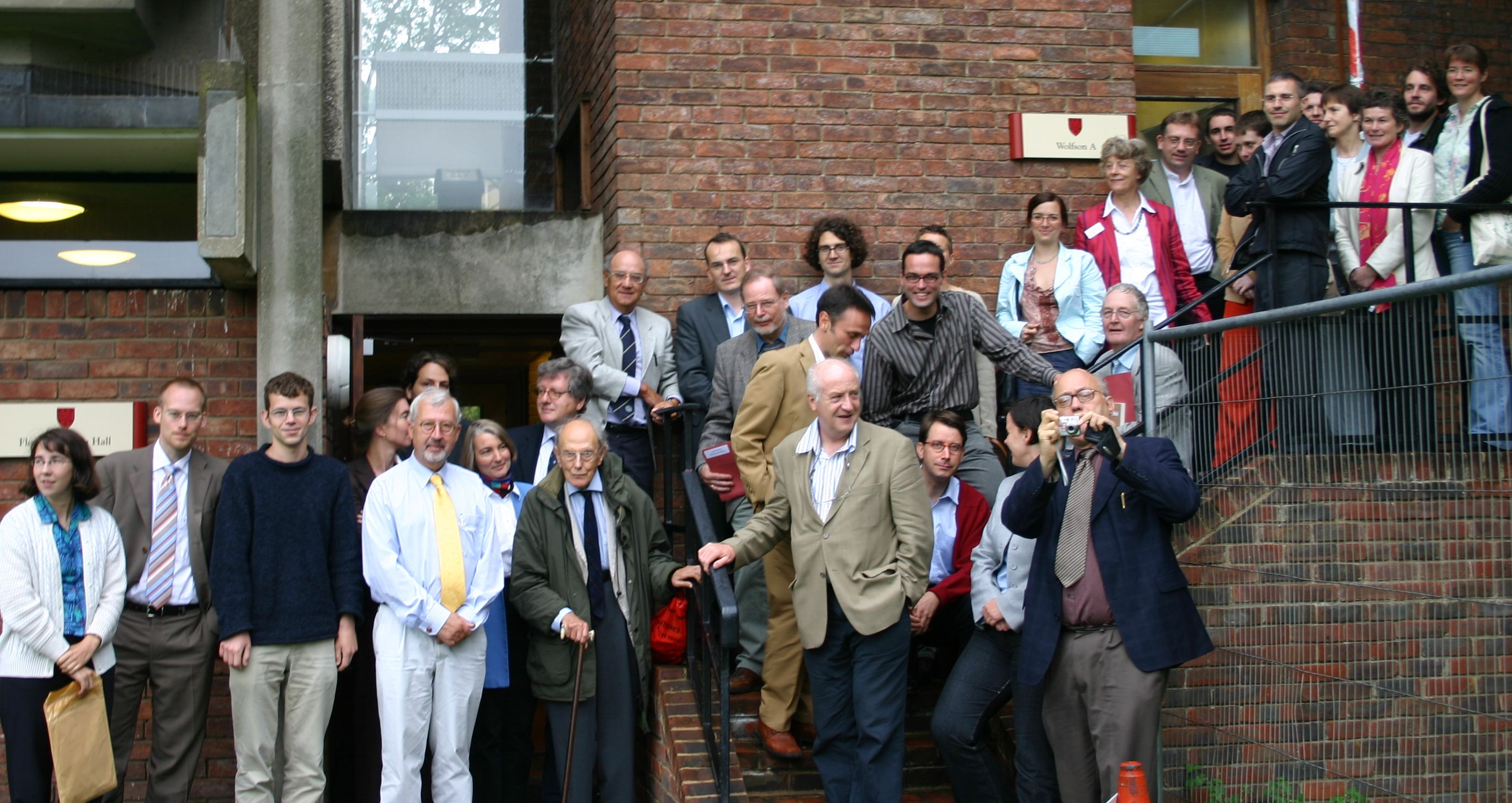
Ganz during his last public appearance at the Anglo-German Colloquium 2005 in Somerville College, Oxford

In 1949, he married Rosemary Allen (died 1986). They had two sons: Adam Ganz (a writer who also wrote a play on his father's experiences at Farm Hall) and David Ganz (until 2010 Professor of Paleography at King's College London), and two daughters: Deborah Ganz and Rachel Ganz. After Rosemary Allen's death, he married Nicolette Mout (Professor of Modern History at Leiden) in 1987.

== Orders and awards ==
In 1973, he received the Großes Bundesverdienstkreuz in acknowledgement of his services in establishing scholarly exchange between English and German Germanists, and in 1993 an honorary doctorate of the University of Erlangen–Nuremberg. He was also an Honorary Professor at the University of Göttingen.

== Selected publications ==
- Der Einfluss des Englischen auf den deutschen Wortschatz (1957)
- Gottfried von Strassburg's Tristan (1978)
- editor: Dukus Horant
- editor: Burckhardt's lectures Über das Studium der Geschichte (1982, also as volume 10 of the Kritische Gesamtausgabe, 2000)

Academic offices
Preceded by	Chair of Medieval German, Oxford University; 1972–1985	Succeeded by Nigel F Palmer
