= Agathon Benary =

German classical philologist (1807–1860)

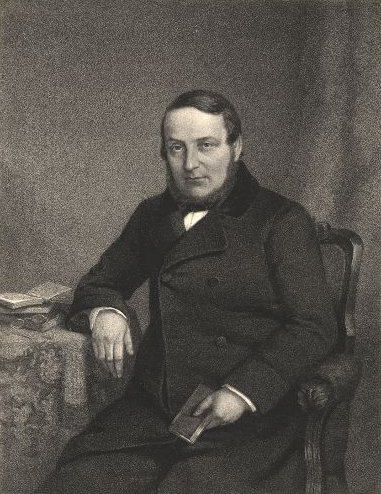
Karl Albert Agathon Benary

Karl Albert Agathon Benary (17 January 1807, Kassel – 4 December 1860, Berlin) was a German classical philologist. He was the brother of orientalist Franz Ferdinand Benary (1805–1880).

He received his education at the gymnasiums in Göttingen and Erfurt, where he was a student of Franz Ernst Heinrich Spitzner. From 1824 to 1827 he studied classical philology at the universities of Göttingen and Halle, obtaining his doctorate with the dissertation "De Aeschyli Prometheo soluto". At Halle he was especially influenced by the teachings of Christian Karl Reisig. After graduation, he worked as a high school teacher in Berlin, and in the meantime, continued his philological studies as a pupil of Franz Bopp. From 1833 up until his death in 1860, he was associated with the Cölnischen Realgymnasium in Berlin. During this time period, he also gave lectures at the University of Berlin.

== Works ==
He was among the first linguists to apply procedures of comparative grammar to Latin and Greek. His major work on Roman phonology, "Die römische Lautlehre sprachvergleichend dargestellt" (volume 1, 1837) unfortunately remained unfinished. A number of his essays were published in the "Jahrbüchern für wissenschaftliche Kritik " and in Adalbert Kuhn's "Zeitschrift für vergleichende Sprachforschung" (Journal of Comparative Linguistics). The following are a few of his noted written efforts:

- Das Unterscheidende des römischen Lautgesetzes. Berlin, 1836.
- Zur Vertheidigung der Gymnasien gegen die Beschuldigungen und Anträge des Herrn Regierungs- und Medicinal-Raths Dr. Lorinser (with A. Krech und A. Seebeck) Berlin, 1836.
- Zur Geschichte der Herausgabe der "Zeitschrift für Wissenschaft und Leben und meiner" Theilnahme an derselben. Berlin, 1844.
