= Franz Ferdinand Benary =

German orientalist and exegete

Franz Ferdinand Benary (22 March 1805, Kassel – 7 February 1880, Berlin) was a German orientalist and exegete. He was the older brother of classical philologist Agathon Benary.

From 1824 he studied theology and oriental languages at the universities of Bonn, Halle and Berlin. At Halle he was especially influenced by the teachings of Wilhelm Gesenius. In 1829 he qualified as a lecturer of oriental languages at the University of Berlin, where in 1831, he was appointed an associate professor of Old Testament exegesis.

In the realm of politics he was a distinguished member of the Fortschrittspartei (Progressive Party). Along with art historian Heinrich Gustav Hotho, theologian Wilhelm Vatke, philosopher Karl Ludwig Michelet and Agathon Benary, he was a prominent member of the liberal reform faction in regards to Hegelianism at Berlin.

== Selected works ==
- Nalodaya; Sanscritum carmen, Calidaso adscriptum una cum Pradschnacari Mithilensis scholiis, 1830 (edition of Kālidāsa).
- De Hebraeorum leviratu, 1835.
- Coniectanea quaedam in vetus testamentum, 1835.
- "Interpretation of the number 666 (χξϛ) in the Apocalypse (13:18) and the various reading 616 (χιϛ)". Translated from the "Zeitschrift für speculative Theologie", (1836) Vol. I Part II by Henry Boynton Smith.
