= William James Entwistle =

English Hispanist

William James Entwistle, FBA (7 December 1895 – 13 June 1952) was a British scholar of Romance languages and literatures, with a focus on Spanish.

Born in China to British missionary parents, he was educated at a mission school and then Robert Gordon's College in Aberdeen before he studied classics at the University of Aberdeen. Graduating in 1916 (with several prizes), he then served in the First World War. In 1918, he received the Fullerton Classical Scholarship at his alma mater; during this time, he turned his scholarly attention to Spanish and in 1920 received a Carnegie Trust grant to spend time in Spain. The following year, he was appointed to a lectureship in Spanish at the University of Manchester. From 1925 to 1932, he was Stevenson Professor of Spanish at the University of Glasgow. In 1932, he moved to the University of Oxford to be King Alfonso XIII Professor of Spanish Studies and a fellow of Exeter College; he retired in 1951. While there, he established the honours course in Portuguese and became Director of Portuguese Studies in 1933. He was also co-editor of the Modern Language Review from 1934 to 1948. He received four honorary doctorates, was elected a fellow of the British Academy in 1950, and was the president of the Modern Humanities Research Association in 1952.
