= Henrike Lähnemann =

German medievalist and professor (born 1968)

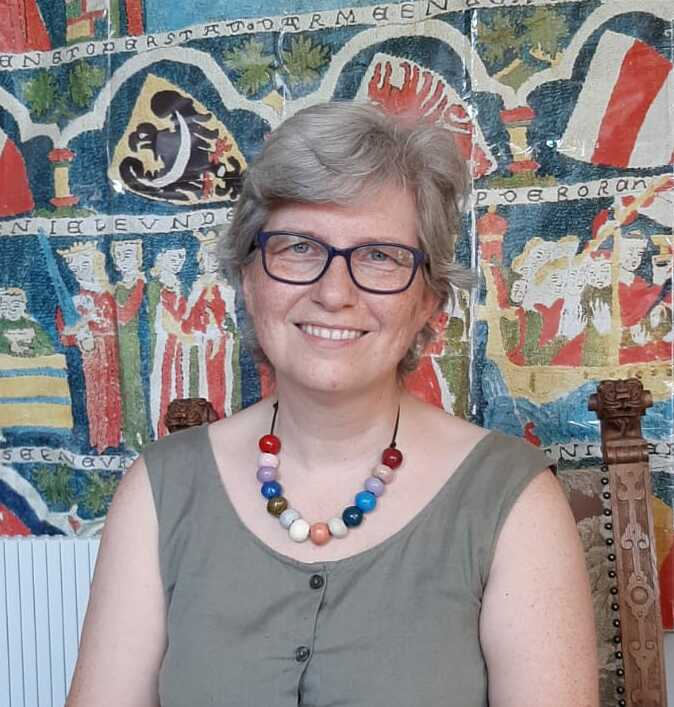
- Lahnemann in Oxford, 2020
- Born: 15 May 1968 (age 58); Münster, Germany

Academic background
- Education: University of Bamberg; University of Edinburgh; Free University of Berlin; University of Göttingen

Academic work
- Discipline: Medieval studies
- Institutions: University of Tübingen; Newcastle University; Faculty of Medieval and Modern Languages, University of Oxford; St Edmund Hall, Oxford

Henrike Lähnemann (born 15 May 1968 in Münster) is a German medievalist and holds the Chair of Medieval German, University of Oxford. She is a Fellow of St Edmund Hall, Oxford.

== Career ==
Lähnemann is the daughter of the theologian Johannes Lähnemann, and the granddaughter of the German medievalist Eleonore Dörner (née Benary) and the archaeologist Friedrich Karl Dörner; she grew up in Lüneburg and Nuremberg, Germany. She studied German literature, History of Art and Theology at the University of Bamberg, the University of Edinburgh, Free University of Berlin and University of Göttingen. She completed a PhD at the Universität Bamberg on late medieval didactic literature.

Lähnemann worked at the University of Tübingen, where she gained her Venia legendi in German Philology with a study of the Book of Judith in German medieval literature. She spent a year as a Feodor Lynen Research Fellow at the University of Oxford and a semester as visiting professor at the University of Zurich. Between 2006 and 2014 she held the Chair of German Studies at Newcastle University, and was also Head of the German Section in Newcastle's School of Modern Languages. In 2010, the German Research Foundation nominated her for AcademiaNet, the database of profiles of leading women scientists; she also chaired Women in German Studies between 2009 and 2015. In 2015, she was appointed to the Chair of Medieval German Language and Literature at the University of Oxford. Between 2015 and 2024 she spent two months each year based at FRIAS as a Senior Research Fellow, made possible by co-funding of the Oxford chair by the VolkswagenStiftung, the DAAD, and the University of Freiburg.

Her research focuses on medieval manuscripts, the relationship of text and images and how vernacular and Latin literature are connected, currently mainly in late medieval Northern German convents. At the moment she is working on a Gerda Henkel Stiftung funded project to edit the letters of the nuns from Lüne (together with Eva Schlotheuber), and the edition of prayer books of the Medingen Convent. Their trade book about late medieval nuns, first published by Ullstein Verlag 2023 in German as 'Un-erhörte Frauen' is open access available in English as 'The Life of Nuns'.

Lähnemann's major topic is the engagement with the Reformation and printing. She brought a new linguistic and interdisciplinary angle to Reformation Studies in Oxford, completing the team of experts – Lyndal Roper and Diarmaid MacCulloch being counted among them. As part of the Translating, Printing, Singing the Reformation project a website providing access to digitised Reformation pamphlets was launched, as well as a blog and podcast documenting the most recent activities of the Reformation team. Furthermore, book printing workshops and new productions of key scenes from the Reformation took place. The political relevance of the project becomes evident in the combination of Reformation and anti-Brexit ideas, but especially in the use of Reformation pamphlets for a protest-Hallelujah in the context of civil resistance in Hong Kong.

The author Angelika Overath dedicated her novel Sie dreht sich um to Lähnemann.

== Research projects ==
- Treasures of the Taylorian. Series One: Reformation Pamphlets
- Medingen Manuscripts
- The Nuns' Network. Editing the Lüne letters (with Eva Schlotheuber, financed by the Gerda Henkel Stiftung). Film documentation of the project
- Sword of Judith Project
- The Renner of Hugo von Trimberg
- Jüngerer Sigenot

== Selected publications ==
Full publication list on Henrike Lähnemann's institutional website.

- Lähnemann, H., Schlotheuber E. The Life of Nuns. Love, Politics, and Religion in Medieval German Convents. OBP 2024 https://doi.org/10.11647/OBP.0397
- Lähnemann H., Jones, H. [ed.]: Martin Luther, Ein Sendbrief vom Dolmetschen und Fürbitte der Heiligen. An Open Letter on Translating and the Intercession of Saints (Treasures of the Taylorian. Series One: Reformation Pamphlets 5), 2nd ed. 2022.
- Lähnemann H., Schlotheuber, E. et al.: Netzwerke der Nonnen. Edition und Erschließung der Briefsammlung aus Kloster Lüne (ca. 1460–1555), in: Wolfenbütteler Digitale Editionen. Wolfenbüttel 2016–, online.
- Lähnemann, H., Hascher-Burger, U.: Liturgie und Reform im Kloster Medingen. Edition und Untersuchung des Propst-Handbuchs Oxford, Bodleian Library, MS. Lat. liturg. e. 18 (Spätmittelalter, Humanismus, Reformation 76), Tübingen: Mohr Siebeck 2013.
- Brine K, Ciletti E, Lähnemann H, ed. The Sword of Judith. Judith Studies Across the Disciplines. Cambridge, UK: Open Book Publishers, 2010.
- Lähnemann H., Linden S, ed. Dichtung und Didaxe. Lehrhaftes Sprechen in der deutschen Literatur des Mittelalters. Berlin / New York: de Gruyter, 2009.
- Lähnemann H. Hystoria Judith: Deutsche Judithdichtungen vom 12. bis zum 16. Jahrhundert. Berlin: Walter de Gruyter, 2006.

Academic offices
Preceded by Nigel F Palmer	Chair of Medieval German, University of Oxford; 2015–	Succeeded by incumbent
