= Lewis H. Gann =

American historian

- Born: Ludwig Hermann Ganz; 1924; Mainz, Rhine Province, Germany
- Died: 17 January 1997 (aged 72); Palo Alto, California, United States

Academic background
- Education: University of Oxford

Academic work
- Discipline: African history
- Institutions: Stanford University (Hoover Institution)

Lewis Henry Gann (1924–1997) was a historian, political scientist and archivist in the United States. He researched African history and specialized in the history of Central Africa in colonial era, writing a number of works in collaboration with Peter Duignan. He also worked on aspects of the history of the United States, European history, and plural societies.

== Biography ==
Gann was born Ludwig Hermann Ganz in Mainz, Germany into a German Jewish family. His elder brother was the Germanist Peter Ganz. In 1938, Ludwig and his brother escaped from Nazi anti-Semitic persecution and settled in the United Kingdom, joining his father who had been employed by textile company Morton Sundour based in Carlisle. His mother joined them in 1939. He was educated at Carlisle Grammar School in northern England. In 1943, Gann enlisted in the Royal Fusiliers and served in World War II. He was demobilised in 1947.

After the war, Gann joined the University of Oxford and gained a bachelor's degree in Modern History from Balliol College, Oxford in 1950. After graduating, he travelled to Central Africa where he took a research post at the Rhodes-Livingstone Institute in Northern Rhodesia (now Zambia). He continued his studies at Oxford and gained a masters (B.Litt.) and doctorate in 1964. He also worked at the University of Manchester (1952–54). In 1954, he emigrated to Southern Rhodesia after being offered a post at the National Archives of Rhodesia. Gann emigrated to the United States in 1963 where he took up a position at the Hoover Institution Library and Archives in Stanford University as a senior fellow and curator of the institute's African and European collections. He held a number of visiting fellowships at such institutions as the Institute for Advanced Study, Princeton and as a senior research associate, St Antony's College, Oxford University and was a fellow of the Royal Historical Society in London and was an Officer of the Order of Merit of the Federal Republic of Germany.

During the course of his academic career, Gann authored or edited 38 books, mainly on the subject of African history, European History, and political science. He produced a number of important works in collaboration with Peter Duignan. The two notably edited the five-volume Colonialism in Africa, 1870–1960 series (1969–74) with Cambridge University Press.

He was married to Rita Gann and they had two children. Lewis Gann died at Palo Alto, California on 17 January 1997.

== Notable publications ==
Monographs

- The Birth of a Plural Society: The Development of Northern Rhodesia under the British South Africa Company, 1894-1914 (Manchester: Rhodes-Livingstone Institute, 1958). Second edition published in 1968.
- A History of Northern Rhodesia: Early Days to 1953 (London: Chatto & Windus, 1964). Several editions.
- Guerrillas in History (Stanford: Hoover Institution Press, 1971).
- Central Africa: The Former British States (Englewood Cliffs: Prentice Hall, 1971).
- The Makings of Central Africa (Salisbury: Central Africa Historical Association, 1972).
- Neo-colonialism, imperialism, and the "New Class" (Menlo Park: Institute for Humane Studies, 1975).

With Peter Duignan

- White Settlers in Tropical Africa (Hammondsworth: Penguin, 1962).
- Burden of Empire (The Pall Mall Press, Published for Hoover Institution, Stanford University, 1968)
- Africa and the World: An Introduction to the History of Sub-Saharan Africa from Antiquity to 1840 (San Francisco: Chandler, 1972).
- The Rulers of German Africa 1884-1914 (Stanford: Stanford University Press, 1977).
- The Rulers of British Africa, 1870-1914 (Stanford: Stanford University Press, 1978).
- The Rulers of Belgian Africa, 1884-1914 (Princeton: Princeton University Press, 1979).
- The United States and Africa, A History (Cambridge Press, 1984)
- The Hispanics in the United States: A History (Stanford: Hoover Institute, 1986)
- The Rebirth of the West (Blackwell, 1992)
- Contemporary Europe and the Atlantic Alliance (Blackwell, 1998)
