= Ann Jefferson =

Professor A. M. Jefferson FBA
- Born: 3 November 1949 (age 77)
- Spouses: Anthony Glees (m. 1971; div. 1992) Michael Holland (m. 2011)
- Children: Three

Academic background
- Education: St Anne's College, Oxford; Wolfson College, Oxford

Academic work
- Discipline: French literature
- Sub-discipline: Nouveau Roman; Literary theory; Stendhal; Nathalie Sarraute
- Institutions: St John's College, Oxford; New College, Oxford; Faculty of Medieval and Modern Languages, University of Oxford

Ann Margaret Jefferson, FBA (born 3 November 1949) is a British scholar of French literature. She was a fellow and tutor in French at New College, Oxford, from 1987 to 2015, and professor of French at the University of Oxford from 2006 to 2015.

== Early life and education ==
Jefferson was born on 3 November 1949 to Antony and Eirlys Jefferson. She studied at St Anne's College, Oxford, graduating with a Bachelor of Arts (BA) degree in 1971: as per tradition, her BA was later promoted to a Master of Arts (MA) degree. She then moved to Wolfson College, Oxford, where she undertook postgraduate research and she completed her Doctor of Philosophy (DPhil) degree in 1976.

== Academic career ==
From 1978 to 1982, Jefferson was a junior research fellow at St John's College, Oxford. Then, from 1982 to 1987, she was a college lecturer at St John's College. In 1987, she was elected a fellow of New College, Oxford and appointed a college tutor in French. From 1987 to 2006, she was also a lecturer in French in the Faculty of Medieval and Modern Languages of the University of Oxford. In 2006, she was appointed professor of French literature by the University of Oxford. In 2015, she retired from full-time academia and was appointed an emeritus fellow of New College.

Outside of Oxford, Jefferson has held a number of visiting scholar appointments. In 2006, she was a visiting professor at Columbia University in the United States. In 2008, she was a visiting professor at the Sorbonne in Parish, France. From February 2016 to June 2016, she was a fellow of the Institut d'études avancées de Paris (Paris Institute for Advanced Study).

== Personal life ==
In 1971, Jefferson married Anthony Glees; they divorced in 1992. Together they had two sons and one daughter. In 2011, she married Michael Holland.

== Honours ==
In 2001, Jefferson was appointed a Member of the Ordre des Palmes Académiques by the French government. In 2004, she was elected a Fellow of the British Academy (FBA), the United Kingdom's national academy for the humanities and social sciences. In 2012, she was promoted to Commander of the Ordre des Palmes Académiques.

== Selected works ==
- Jefferson, Ann (1980). The Nouveau Roman and the Poetics of Fiction. Cambridge: Cambridge University Press. ISBN 9780-521222396.
- Jefferson, Ann; Robey, David, eds. (1982). Modern Literary Theory: a Comparative Introduction. London: Batsford. ISBN 978-0713434545.
- Jefferson, Ann; Robey, David, eds. (1986). Modern Literary Theory: a Comparative Introduction (2nd ed.). London: Batsford. ISBN 978-0713452907.
- Jefferson, Ann (1988). Reading Realism in Stendhal. Cambridge: Cambridge University Press. ISBN 978-0511983818.
- Jefferson, Ann (2000). Nathalie Sarraute, Fiction and Theory: Questions of Difference. Cambridge: Cambridge University Press. ISBN 978-1139426794.
- Jefferson, Ann (2003). Stendhal: La Chartreuse de Parme. London: Grant & Cutler. ISBN 978-0729304405.
- Jefferson, Ann (2007). Biography and the Question of Literature in France. Oxford: Oxford University Press. ISBN 978-0199270842.
- Jefferson, Ann (2014). Genius in France: An Idea and its Uses. Princeton, NJ: Princeton University Press. ISBN 978-0691160658.
- Jefferson, Ann (2020). Nathalie Sarraute: A Life Between. Princeton, NJ: Princeton University Press. Published in French as Nathalie Sarraute. Paris: Flammarion (2019).
