= Jeffrey F. Hamburger =

American art historian

Jeffrey Francis Hamburger (born 1957) is an American art historian specializing in medieval religious art and illuminated manuscripts. In 2000 he joined the faculty of Harvard University, where in 2008 he was appointed the Kuno Francke Professor of German Art and Culture. Hamburger received his B.A., M.A. and Ph.D. from Yale and has previously held professorships at Oberlin College and the University of Toronto. Elected a Fellow of the Medieval Academy in 2001, he has won numerous awards for his publications, among them: the Charles Rufus Morey Prize of the College Art Association (1999), the Roland H. Bainton Book Prize in Art & Music (1999), the Otto Gründler Prize of the International Congress on Medieval Studies (1999), the Jacques Barzun Prize in Cultural History of the American Philosophical Society (1998), the John Nicholas Brown Prize of the Medieval Academy of America (1994), and the Gustave O. Arlt Award in the Humanities of the American Council of Graduate Schools (1991). His research has been supported by fellowships from the Guggenheim Foundation, the American Philosophical Society, the Institute for Advanced Study, the National Endowment for the Humanities, the Center for Advanced Study in the Visual Arts, and the Alexander von Humboldt Foundation. In 2009 Hamburger was elected a member of the American Academy of Arts and Sciences and in 2010, of the American Philosophical Society. In 2015 he was awarded an Anneliese Maier Research Award by the Alexander von Humboldt Foundation. In 2022 he was awarded the Gutenberg Prize of the City of Mainz and the Internationale Gutenberg-Gesellschaft.

== Select bibliography ==
- The Diagram as Paradigm: Cross-Cultural Approaches. Edited by Jeffrey F. Hamburger. Conference proceedings. Dumbarton Oaks Research Library and Collection, 2022. ISBN 9780884024866
- Color in Cusanus. Stuttgart: Hiersemann 2021, ISBN 9783777221212
- The Birth of the Author: Pictorial Prefaces in Glossed Books of the Twelfth Century. Turnhout: Brepols, 2021. ISBN 978-0-88844-225-3
- Beyond Words: New Research on Manuscripts in Boston Collections. Edited by Jeffrey F. Hamburger. Conf. proc. Cambridge and Boston, 2016. Toronto: Pontifical Institute of Mediaeval Studies, 2021. ISBN 9780888442215
- The Liber ordinarius of Nivelles. Liturgy as Interdisciplinary Intersection (Spätmittelalter, Humanismus, Reformation 111). Co-edited with Eva Schlotheuber. Tübingen: Mohr Siebeck, 2020. ISBN 978-3-16-158242-4.
- Diagramming Devotion: Berthold of Nuremberg's Transformation of Hrabanus Maurus's Poems in Praise of the Cross. Chicago: University of Chicago Press, 2020. ISBN 9780226642819
- Liturgical Life and Latin Learning at Paradies bei Soest, 1300–1425. Inscription and Illumination in the Choir Books of a North German Dominican Convent. 2 vols., co-authored with Eva Schlotheuber, Margot Fassler, Susan Marti. Münster: Aschendorff: 2017. ISBN 978-3-402-13072-8.
- Unter Druck: Mitteleuropaische Buchmalerei Im Zeitalter Gutenbergs. Luzern: Quaternio, 2015. English ed. Toronto: Pontifical Institute of Mediaeval Studies, 2018. ISBN 9783905924442
- Leaves from Paradise: The Cult of John the Evangelist at the Dominican Convent of Paradies bei Soest, Houghton Library Studies, vol. 2. Cambridge: Houghton Library, distributed by Harvard University Press, 2008.
- Crown and Veil: The Art of Female Monasticism in the Middle Ages, co-edited with Susan Marti (translation of essays from the catalogue Krone und Schleier. Kunst aus mittelalterlichen Frauenklöster), foreword by Caroline W. Bynum, trans. Dietlinde Hamburger. New York: Columbia University Press, 2008.
- Frauen - Kloster - Kunst: Neue Forschungen zur Kulturgeschichte des Mittelalters. Internationales Kolloquium im Zusammenhang mit Krone und Schleier: Kunst aus mittelalterlichen Frauenklöstern, Die Wolfsburg, Mülheim/Ruhr, co-edited with Carola Jäggi, Susan Marti, Hedwig Röckelein. Turnhout: Brepols, 2007.
- Tributes in Honor of James H. Marrow: Studies in Late Medieval and Renaissance Painting and Manuscript Illumination, co-edited with Anne Korteweg. Turnhout: Brepols, 2006.
- The Mind’s Eye: Art and Theological Argument in the Medieval West, co-edited with Anne-Marie Bouché. Princeton: Department of Art & Archaeology, Princeton University, Princeton University Press, 2005.
- Krone und Schleier: Kunst aus mittelalterlichen Frauenklöstern. International loan exhibition, Kunst- und Austellungshalle der Bundesrepublik Deutschland, Bonn, and Ruhrland Museum, Essen, March 17-July 3, 2005, co-conceived with Jan Gerchow and Robert Suckale, co-edited with Lothar Altringer, Carola Jäggi, Susan Marti, Petra Marx, Hedwig Röckelein. Munich: Hirmer Verlag, 2005.
- St. John the Divine: The Deified Evangelist in Medieval Art and Theology. Berkeley: University of California Press, 2002. ISBN 0-520-22877-4
- Die Ottheinrich-Bibel: Kommentar zur Faksimile-Ausgabe der Handschrift Cgm 8010/1.2 der Bayerischen Staatsbibliothek München, co-authored with Brigitte Gullath, Karin Schneider, & Robert Suckale. Luzern: Faksimile-Verlag, 2002.
- The Visual and the Visionary: Art and Female Spirituality in Late Medieval Germany. Cambridge: MIT Press, 1998. ISBN 0-942299-45-0
- Nuns as Artists: The Visual Culture of a Medieval Convent Berkeley: University of California Press, 1997. ISBN 0-520-20386-0
- The Rothschild Canticles: Art and Mysticism in Flanders and the Rhineland circa 1300. New Haven: Yale University Press, 1990. ISBN 0-300-04308-2
