= Oxford German Studies =

- Discipline: German studies
- Language: English, German
- Edited by: Henrike Lähnemann, Karen Leeder

Publication details
- History: 1965-present
- Publisher: Routledge
- Frequency: Quarterly

Standard abbreviations
- ISO 4: Oxf. Ger. Stud.

Indexing
- ISSN: 0078-7191 (print); 1745-9214 (web)
- LCCN: 82641755
- OCLC no.: 1640444

Links
- Journal homepage; Online access; Online archive

Oxford German Studies is a quarterly peer-reviewed academic journal covering German studies. It was established in 1965 and was published by Maney Publishing (formerly the Modern Humanities Research Association), until its takeover by Taylor & Francis, where it is now published under their imprint Routledge. It was established, among others, by Peter Ganz (St Edmund Hall, Oxford). The editors-in-chief are Henrike Lähnemann and Karen Leeder.

== Abstracting and indexing ==
The journal is abstracted and indexed in:

- Arts and Humanities Citation Index
- British Humanities Index
- Current Contents/Arts & Humanities
- International Bibliography of Periodical Literature
- Linguistics and Language Behaviour Abstracts
- MLA Bibliography
- Scopus
