= Hermann Georg Fiedler =

German scholar

- Portrait photograph of Fiedler, c. 1904
- Born: April 28, 1862; Zittau, Kingdom of Saxony
- Died: April 10, 1945 (aged 82); Oxford, England
- Occupation: Academic
- Known for: First Taylor Professor of the German Language and Literature
- Spouse: Ethel Mary
- Children: 2

Academic background
- Education: Leipzig University (PhD, 1888
- Doctoral advisor: Friedrich Zarncke

Academic work
- Discipline: German studies
- Sub-discipline: German philology
- Institutions: Queen Margaret College; University of Glasgow; Mason College; University of Birmingham; University of Oxford
- Main interests: German language and literature

Hermann Georg Fiedler (28 April 1862 – 10 April 1945) was a German scholar, who became Taylor Professor of the German Language and Literature at the University of Oxford (1907–37). He was previously lecturer in German at Mason College (which later became Birmingham University).

== Biography ==
H.G. Fiedler was born in 1862 in Zittau, Kingdom of Saxony. In July 1888, he received a doctorate from the University of Leipzig in German philology and literature under Friedrich Zarncke. In October 1888, Zarncke helped in Fiedler becoming a lecturer in German at Queen Margaret College and the University of Glasgow until 1890.

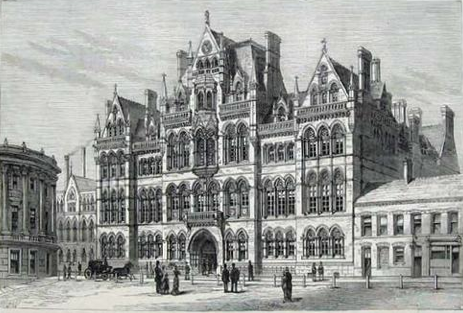
Mason College, now the University of Birmingham

In October 1890, Fiedler was then appointed Professor of German at Mason College. Fiedler was instrumental in the setting up of University of Birmingham. He was a member of the initial committee of nine set up in 1894 by Robert Heath.

In July 1907, Fiedler was appointed the first Taylor Professor of the German Language and Literature at the University of Oxford and a Fellow of The Queen's College. In 1911, he became a British citizen and he was a tutor to the Prince of Wales (later King Edward VIII) between 1912 and 1914. However, in 1915, during World War I, he felt obliged to offer his resignation, but this was not accepted. He continued to run the German department at Oxford University during World War I.

In 1926, Fiedler was appointed secretary to the curators of the Taylor Institution in central Oxford. He improved the Taylor Institution Library and was in charge of the extension of the Taylor Institution, which was opened in 1932 by the Edward, Prince of Wales. In May 1931, he met the physicist Albert Einstein, a fellow German speaker, during a visit by Einstein to Oxford. He retired in 1937.

He was an important figure in the English Goethe Society.

During the first years of Nazi rule in Germany, Fiedler continued to work for understanding between Germany and the United Kingdom. In August 1935, two months after Hitler had concluded the Anglo-German Naval Agreement with the United Kingdom and thus given rise to hopes for peace, Fiedler represented the United Kingdom at the 50th-anniversary celebrations of the Goethe-Gesellschaft (Goethe Society) in Weimar. In his short speech on this occasion, he stressed ties between his native and adopted countries, to enthusiastic applause. As late as 1938, he had "a warm heart for Germany".

H.G. Fiedler edited a number of books related to German studies during his career, particularly an anthology of German verse (Das Oxforder Buch Deutscher Dichtung vom 12ten bis zum 20sten Jahrhundert, with a foreword by Gerhart Hauptmann, Oxford 1911, 2nd edn. 1927, reprinted many times). The selection of poets was conservative, with few of the truly innovative poets of the twentieth century, especially those from Expressionism or with Marxist leanings. Fiedler never published a full-length scholarly monograph, but focused on pedagogy and collecting manuscripts of German authors. These formed the core of an important collection at the Taylor Institution of Oxford University.

== Family ==
In 1899, Hermann Fiedler married his former pupil Ethel Mary (1870/71–1933, a daughter of Charles Harding), who wrote a diary covering their marriage between 1899 and 1922. They had two daughters, Herma (born 1902) and Beryl (born 1913). Beryl died on 2 May 1920, which caused serious depression in Ethel for the rest of her life.

== Works ==
- Das Oxforder Buch Deutscher Dichtung vom 12ten bis zum 20sten Jahrhundert - (1911)
- Beneath the Wheel 1906 by Hermann Hesse (1915, as translator)
- Buch deutscher Dichtung, von Luther bis Liliencron - (1916)
- A First German Course for Science Students - (1921)
- Knulp 1915 by Hermann Hesse (1923, as translator)
- German Short Stories (1928)
- Klingsor's Last Summer 1920 by Hermann Hesse (1930, as translator)
