= Schwarz-Taylor Professor of the German Language and Literature =

Professorship at the University of Oxford

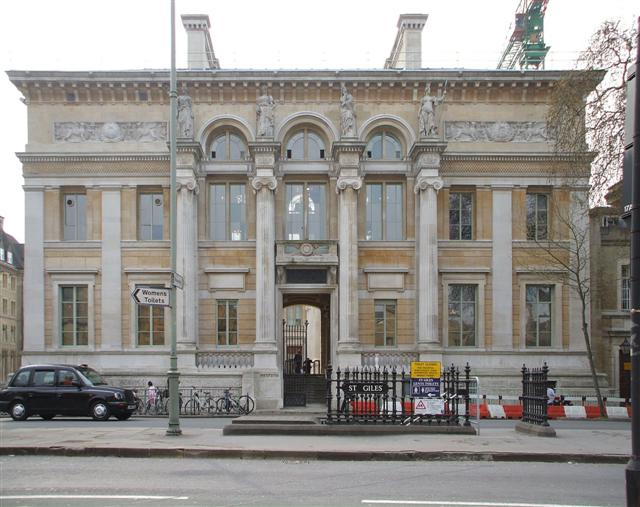
The Taylor Institution in Oxford

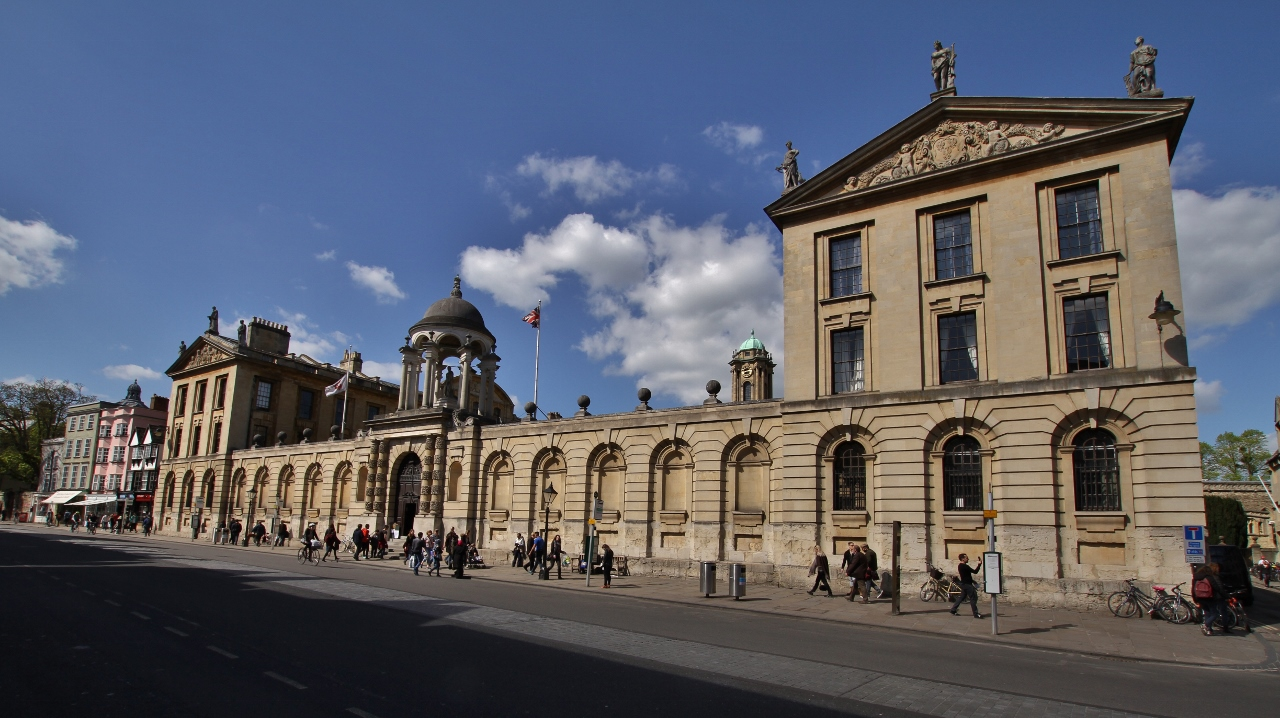
The Queen's College, Oxford

The position of Taylor Professor of the German Language and Literature (named after the architect Robert Taylor, whose bequest funded the Taylor Institution) is one of the permanent chairs at the University of Oxford. The position was established in 1907. It is associated with a fellowship at The Queen's College, Oxford. The people to have held the position are:

- Hermann Georg Fiedler 1907–1937;
- James Boyd 1938–1959;
- Ernest Stahl 1959–1969;
- Siegbert Salomon Prawer 1969–1986;
- Terence James Reed 1989–2004;
- Manfred Engel 2006-2009;
- Ritchie Robertson 2010–2021;
- Karen Leeder 2021–present.

The post was renamed the 'Schwarz–Taylor Professor of the German Language and Literature' in 2020, following a donation from the Dieter Schwarz Foundation.

== See also ==
- Taylor Institution, Oxford
