= Friedrich Karl Dörner =

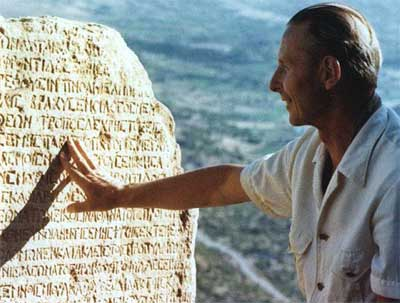
Friedrich Karl Dörner.

Friedrich Karl Dörner (born 28 February 1911 in Gelsenkirchen; died 10 March 1992) was a German classics, epigrapher and Classical Archeologist.

Born in 1911 as son of the mining office Karl Dörner and his wife Klara in Gelsenkirchen, he studied at the Universities of Münster and Greifswald under Josef Keil Classics, and finished his PhD in 1935. Immediately after that, he was employed by the German Archeological Institute in Berlin and went abroad with the institute's archeological scholarship for 1936/37. 1938–1940, he worked for the DAI in Istanbul as research associate. During this time, he worked at Boğazkale/Hattuša in Turkey, and also visited Bithynia and the Kingdom of Commagene in Asia Minor, which from then on formed his major research area.

After the war, he worked at Tübingen with his wife, the Germanist Eleonore Dörner, née Benary, and their daughter Susanne. They moved to Münster where he founded the Institute Asia Minor. After his retirement, they moved to Nürnberg to be closer to the family with their three granddaughters.

== Selected publications ==
- Arsameia am Nymphaios: Die Ausgrabungen im Hierothesion des Mithradates Kallinikos von 1953-1956, mit Theresa Goell. Gebr. Mann, 1963, ISBN 3-8030-1754-8.
- Der Thron der Götter auf dem Nemrud Dağ. 2. Aufl. Gustav Lübbe, 1987, ISBN 3-7857-0277-9.
- Von Pergamon zum Nemrud Dağ: Die archäologischen Entdeckungen Carl Humanns, mit Eleonore Dörner. P. von Zabern, 1989, ISBN 3-8053-0998-8
