= King Alfonso XIII Professor of Spanish Studies =

Professorship at the University of Oxford

The King Alfonso XIII Professorship of Spanish Studies is a named chair at the University of Oxford. It was established in 1927 by the endowment of £25,000 raised by the Lord Mayor of London and a special committee he chaired for the purpose. The gift was conditional on the university paying £600 a year to maintain a lecturer and a departmental library. It is associated with a fellowship at Exeter College, Oxford (which does not pay a stipend).

== List of professors ==
- 1928–1931: Salvador de Madariaga
- 1932–1952: William James Entwistle, FBA.
- 1953–1981: Sir Peter Edward Lionel Russell, FBA, FRHistS.
- 1982–2003: Ian David Lewis Michael, FKC.
- 2003–2017: Edwin Henry Williamson
- 2018–present: Jonathan William Thacker.
