= Nigel F. Palmer =

British Germanist (1946–2022)

Nigel F. Palmer M.A., D.Phil., FBA
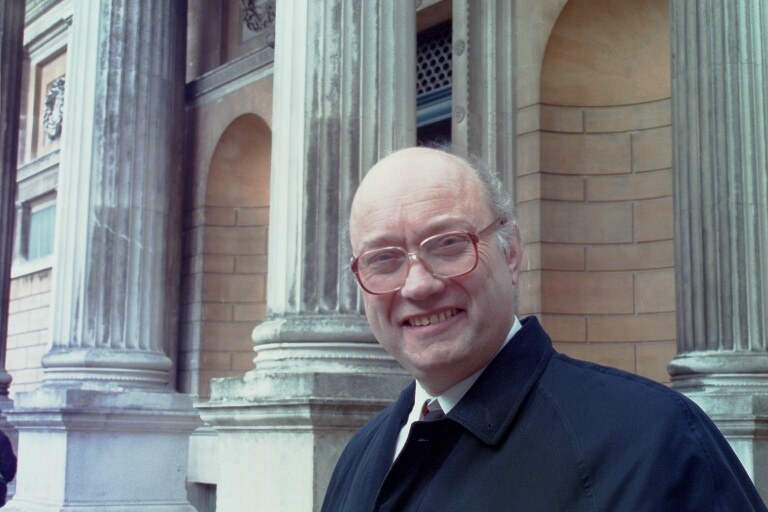
- Nigel F. Palmer in front of the Ashmolean Museum (2001)
- Born: Nigel Fenton Palmer; 28 October 1946; Ashton-under-Lyne, Lancashire, England
- Died: 8 May 2022 (aged 75); Oxford, England
- Occupations: University lecturer, medievalist
- Title: Professor of Medieval German Literature and Language; Fellow of St Edmund Hall, Oxford
- Awards: Fellow of the British Academy; Research Prize of the Alexander von Humboldt Foundation; Meister-Eckhart-Forschungspreis

Academic background
- Education: Hyde Grammar School
- Alma mater: Worcester College, Oxford
- Thesis: "Visio Tnugdali": the German and Dutch translations and their circulation in the later Middle Ages (1975)
- Doctoral advisor: Peter Ganz

Academic work
- Discipline: German language and literature
- Sub-discipline: Medieval German Literature
- Institutions: Durham University; Oriel College, Oxford; St Edmund Hall, Oxford
- Main interests: Literary topography of South West Germany in the later Middle Ages; Palaeography and codicology of the period 1100–1550

Nigel Fenton Palmer FBA (28 October 1946 – 8 May 2022) was a British Germanist and Professor Emeritus at the University of Oxford.

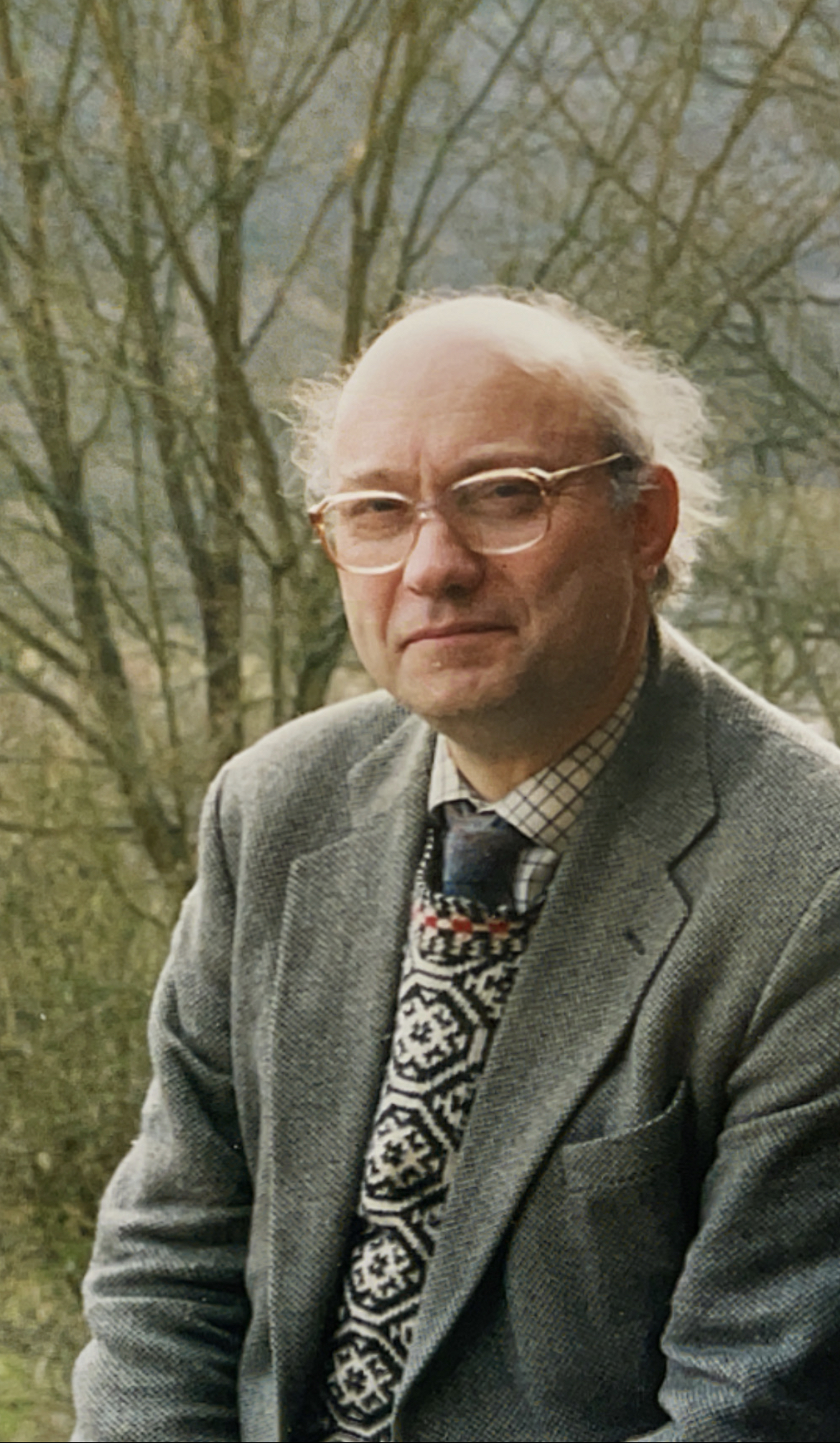
Nigel F. Palmer during an excursion with a group of Tübingen German medievalists to explore the wall paintings in the Gamburg

== Career ==
Nigel F. Palmer went to Hyde Grammar School and then read Modern Languages at Worcester College, Oxford where he graduated in 1969 with a first class degree after spending his year abroad in Vienna. In 1970 he took up a position as lecturer in German at Durham University. His DPhil thesis (1975) was on the German and Dutch versions of the Visio Tnugdali. He was made a fellow of Oriel College, Oxford in 1976 and Professor of Medieval German Literature and Language from 1992 to 2012 at St Edmund Hall, Oxford as successor to Peter Ganz.

He worked on a wide range of topics in mediaeval German language and literature, among them the ‘Literary topography of South West Germany in the later Middle Ages’, an attempt to establish a literary history of this region on the basis of the manuscript sources and library history (Latin and German).

Other areas of special interest were blockbooks and their place in early printing history, the interface between Latin literature and German literature in the Middle Ages, and palaeography and codicology of the period 1100–1550. He was a member of the British Academy since 1997. His work as editor of Oxford German Studies was featured in the celebratory volume 50/4. In 2022, he was awarded the inaugural Meister-Eckhart-Forschungspreis.

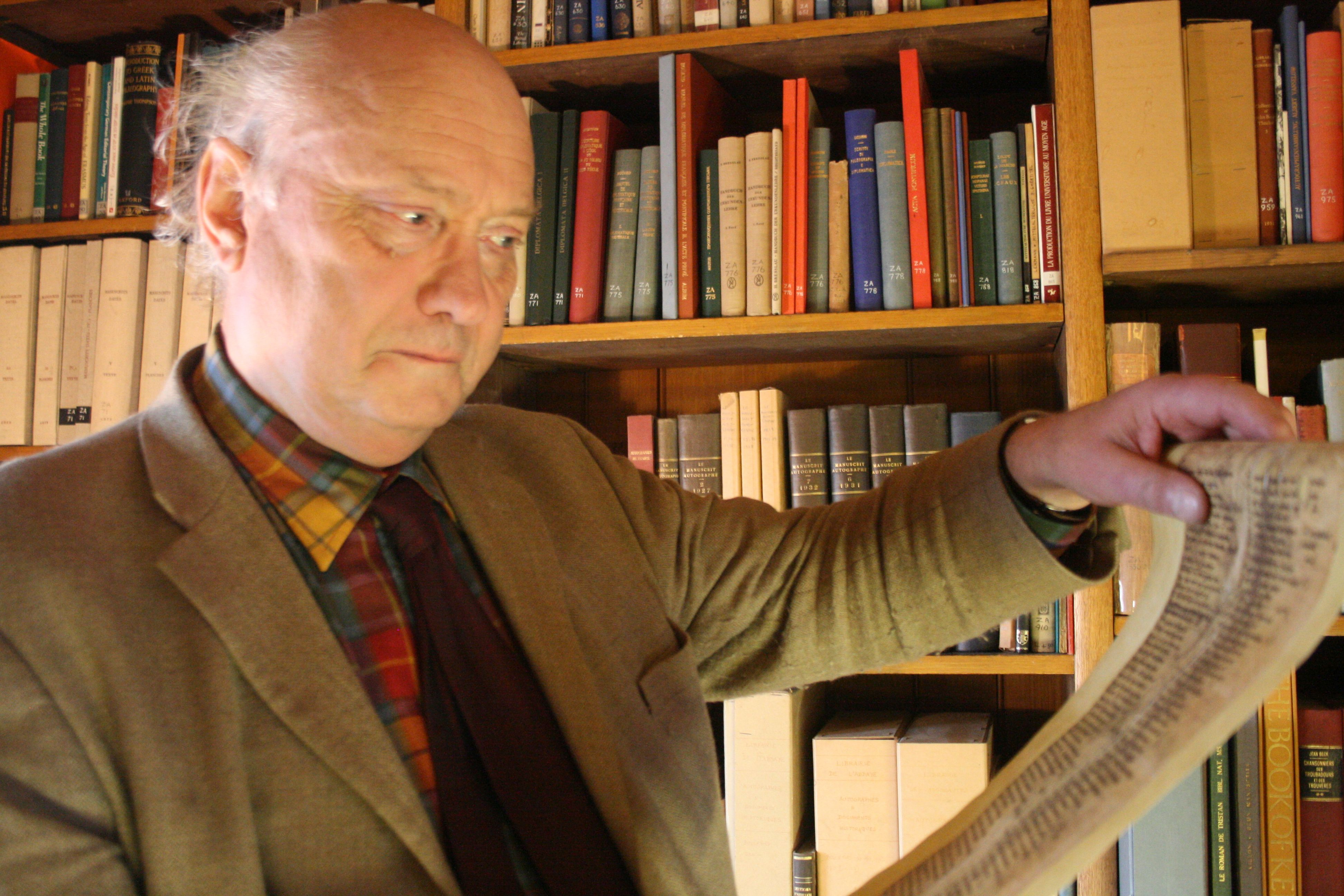
Prof. Nigel F. Palmer, Emeritus Professor of German Medieval and Linguistic Studies, preparing for a lecture series on Easter Plays in Azerbaijan 2015 by examining the facsimile scroll of the Osterspiel von Muri in the Taylor Institution Library, University of Oxford

== Selected publications ==
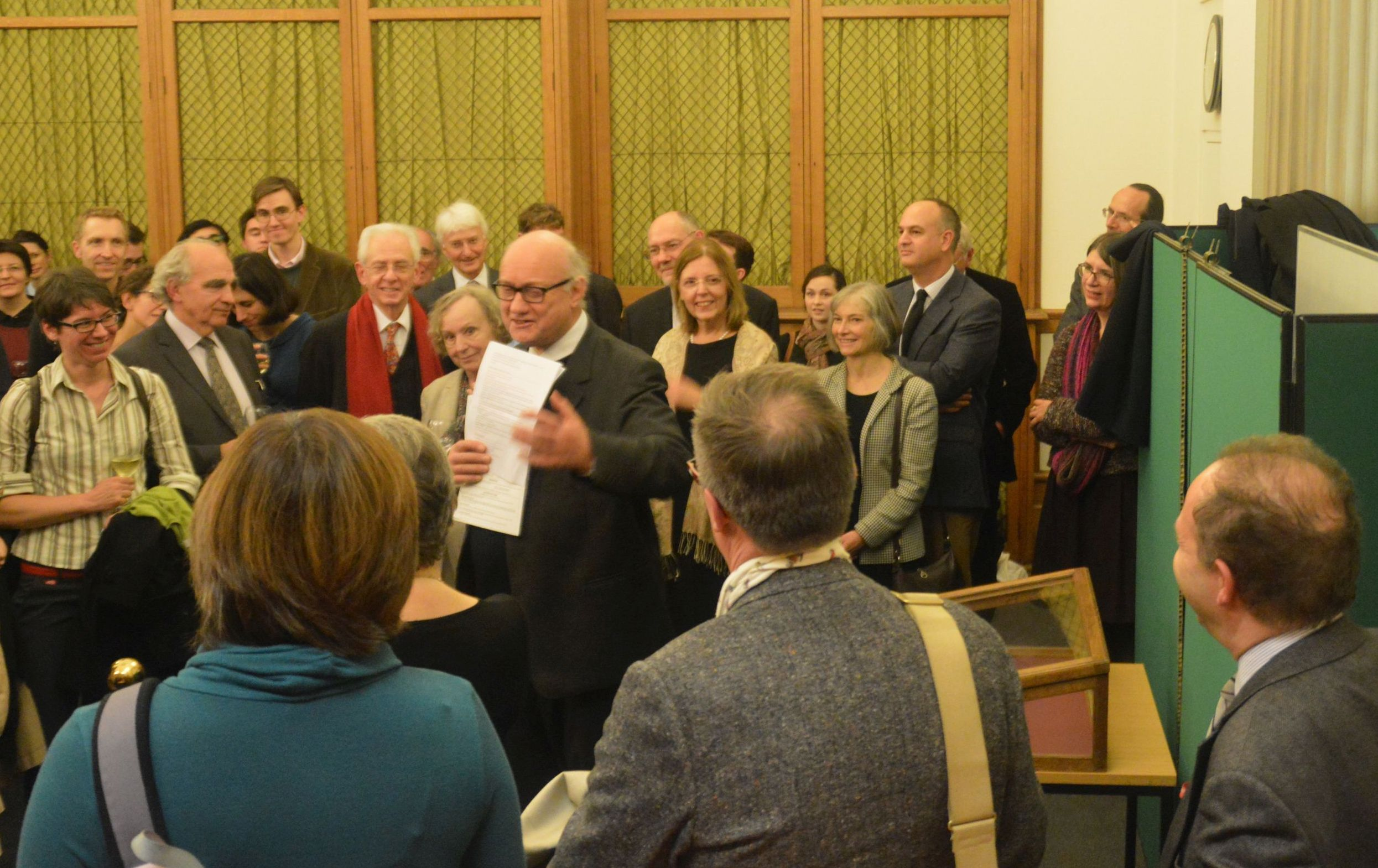
Prof. Nigel F. Palmer, thanking colleagues and friends for fundraising to buy a manuscript in honour of his 70th birthday, Taylor Institution Library, Oxford

- Palmer, Nigel F. (1982). "Visio Tnugdali": the German and Dutch translations and their circulation in the later Middle Ages. Münchener Texte und Untersuchungen zur deutschen Literatur des Mittelalters. Vol. 76. München, Zürich: Artemis-Verlag. ISBN 3760833764(Diss., Oxford University, 1975)
- ——— (1992). "Das Buch als Bedeutungsträger bei Mechthild von Magdeburg". In Speckenbach, K; Harms, W. (eds.). Bildhafte Rede in Mittelalter und früher Neuzeit. Tübingen: Niemeyer. pp. 217–235. ISBN 9783484106697.
- ——— (1993). German Literary Culture in the Twelfth and Thirteenth Centuries. An Inaugural Lecture delivered before the University of Oxford on 4 March 1993. Oxford: Clarendon Press. ISBN 9780199522606.
- ——— (1998). Zisterzienser und ihre Bücher. Die mittelalterliche Bibliotheksgeschichte von Kloster Eberbach im Rheingau. Regensburg: Schnell & Steiner. ISBN 3795411890.
- ——— (2007). Bibelübersetzung und Heilsgeschichte: Studien zur Freiburger Perikopenhandschrift von 1462 und zu den deutschsprachigen Lektionaren des 15. Jahrhunderts. Mit einem Anhang: Deutschsprachige Handschriften, Inkunabeln und Frühdrucke aus Freiburger Bibliotheksbesitz bis ca. 1600. Wolfgang Stammler Gastprofessur für Germanische Philologie. Vol. 9. Berlin: de Gruyter. ISBN 9783110918151(Curriculum Vitae, p. 225, and List of Publications 1973-2007)
- ——— (2009). "'In kaffin in got'. Zur Rezeption des 'Paradisus anime intelligentis' in der Oxforder Handschrift MS. Laud Misc. 479". In Hasebrink, Burkhard; Palmer, Nigel F.; Schiewer, Hans-Jochen (eds.). Paradisus anime intelligentis'. Studien zu einer dominikanischen Predigtsammlung aus dem Umkreis Meister Eckharts. Tübingen: Niemeyer. pp. 69–131. ISBN 9783484108158.
- ——— (2009). "Die Münchner Perikopenhandschrift Cgm 157 und die Handschriftenproduktion des Straßburger Reuerinnenklosters im späten 15. Jahrhundert". In Fleith, Barbara; Wetzel, René (eds.). Kulturtopographie des deutschsprachigen Südwestens im späteren Mittelalter. Studien und Texte. Berlin, New York: de Gruyter. ISBN 9783484895003.
- ——— (2017). "Medieval German Manuscripts in Oxford Libraries". Oxford German Studies. In Honour of Nigel F. Palmer. 47 (2): 126–140. doi:10.1080/00787191.2017.1326525. S2CID 164469383.
- ———; Lähnemann, Henrike, eds. (2008). Bildwelten. German Literature and Visual Culture. Oxford German Studies. Vol. 38. doi:10.1179/007871908x371667. S2CID 218692590.
- ———; Gerhardt, Christoph, eds. (2002). Das Münchner Gedicht von den 15 Zeichen vor dem Jüngsten Gericht. Edition und Kommentar. Texte des späten Mittelalters und der frühen Neuzeit. Berlin: Erich Schmidt. ISBN 9783503061310. The catalogue of medieval and early modern textual witnesses of German and Latin the '15 Zeichen des Jüngsten Gerichts' (15 Signs Before Doomsday) is available via https://handschriftencensus.de/forschungsliteratur/pdf/4224
- Hamburger, Jeffrey F.; Palmer, Nigel F., eds. (2015). The Prayer Book of Ursula Begerin: Reproductions and critical edition. Zürich: Urs Graf. ISBN 9783859512801.
- Palmer, Nigel F.; Ganina, Natalija, eds. (2021). Der Bardewiksche Codex des Lübischen Rechts von 1294. Vol. 1.Faksimile und Erläuterungen. Oppenheim am Rhein: Nünnerich-Asmus. ISBN 9783961761661.
- ———; Saunders, Corinne; Taylor, Jane H.M., eds. (1991–2022). Medium Ævum. Oxford: Society for the Study of Medieval Languages and Literature.

A full list of publications to 2007 will be found in Bibelübersetzung und Heilsgeschichte.

Academic offices
Preceded by Peter Ganz	Chair of Medieval German, Oxford University; 1992–2013	Succeeded by Henrike Lähnemann
