= Franz Ernst Heinrich Spitzner =

German philologist (1787–1841)

Franz Ernst Heinrich Spitzner (October 31, 1787 – July 2, 1841) was a German educator and philologist who specialized in Homeric studies. He was born in Trebitz, Saxony-Anhalt.

He studied theology and philology at the University of Wittenberg, where he was student of Christian Lobeck (1781–1860). In 1811 he became conrector at the Lyceum at Wittenberg, where two years later he was appointed rector. In 1820 he relocated to the Gymnasium at Erfurt, and in 1824 returned to his former position at the Wittenberg Lyceum.

== Published works ==
Spitzner's work on Greek prosody was translated into English and published in 1831 as "Elements of Greek Prosody". He was an editor of Köppen's "Erklärende Anmerkungen zu Homers Ilias" (Explanatory notes on Homer's Iliad). Other noted works by Spitzner are:

- Observationes criticae in Apollonii Rhodii Argonautica, 1810.
- De versu graecorum heroico maxime Homerico, 1816 (with Friedrich Traugott Friedemann).
- Geschichte des Gymnasiums und der Schulanstalten zu Wittenberg, (History of gymnasiums and school institutions in Wittenberg), 1830.
- Observationes criticae et grammatica in Quinti Smyrnaei Posthomerica, 1837.
