= Volkswagen Foundation =

Private German charitable Foundation

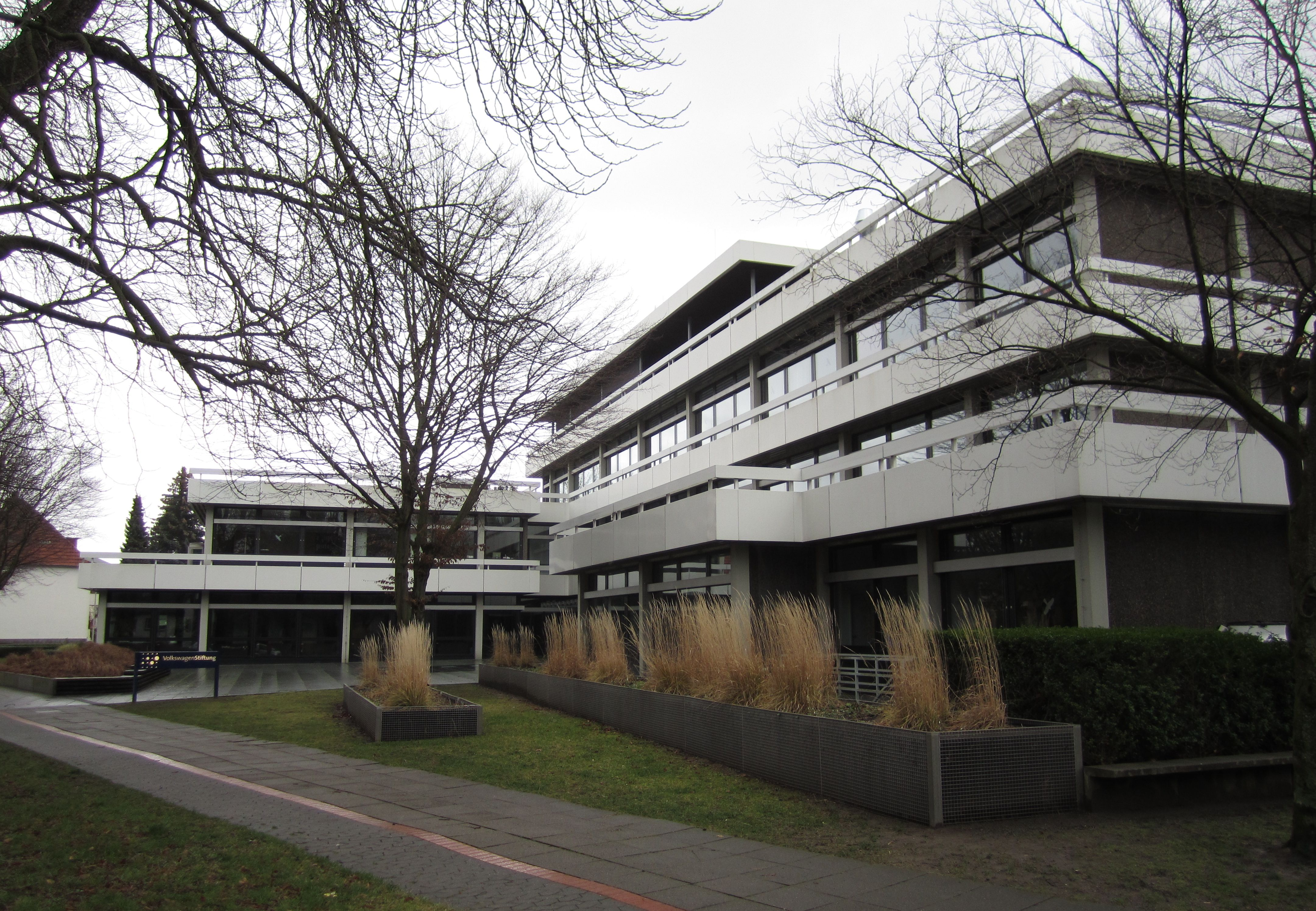
- Established: 1961 (64 years ago)
- Types: charitable corporation, nonprofit organization
- Legal status: German foundation under civil law
- Aim: Science funding in Germany
- Headquarters: Hanover
- Country: Germany
- Directors: Georg Schütte
- Revenue: 352,203,000 euro (2022)
- Total Assets: 3,592,329,000 euro (2022)
- Employees: 115 ±5 (2023)
- Website: www.volkswagenstiftung.de/en

The Volkswagen Foundation (German: VolkswagenStiftung) is the largest German private nonprofit organization involved in the promotion and support of academic research. It is not affiliated to the present company, the Volkswagen Group.

It was established in 1961 as Stiftung Volkswagenwerk with a portion of the confiscated assets of the Volkswagenwerk GmbH.

With a capital of 2.9 billion euros, as of 2016 it is the largest German scientific foundation. Since its founding, it has distributed 4.2 billion Euros in grants for over 30,000 projects, and now funds new projects at the rate of 100 million euros per year.
