= Margot Elsbeth Fassler =

American historian

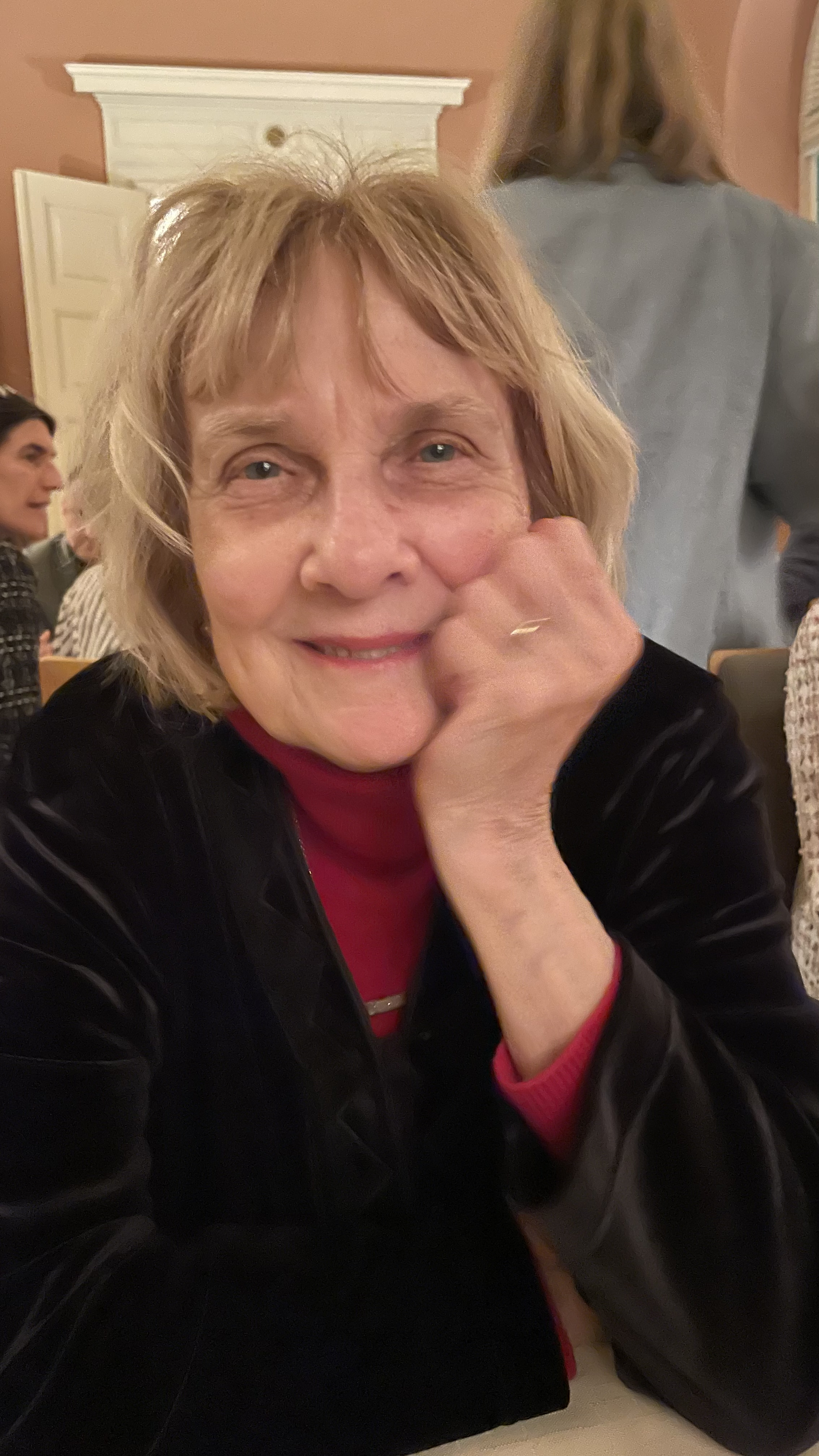
Margot Fassler after giving an address at the farewell colloquium for Eva Schlotheuber at Schloss Mickeln

Margot Elsbeth Fassler (/ˈmɑːrɡoʊ ˈfæslər/) is an American music and Christianity historian, currently the Keough-Hesburgh Professor of Music History and Liturgy at University of Notre Dame.

== Education ==
She completed her PhD at Cornell University.

== Career ==
She is currently the Keough-Hesburgh Professor of Music History and Liturgy, University of Notre Dame.

== Awards and honours ==
She is a member of the North American Academy of Liturgy, a former President of the Medieval Academy of America, a fellow of the American Academy of Arts and Sciences, and an Honorary Member of the American Musicological Society.

== Bibliography ==
Her notable books include:

- The Religious Lyric in Medieval England (1150–1400)
- The Feast of Fools and Danielis Ludus: Popular Tradition in a Medieval Cathedral Play
- Music and the miraculous: Mary in the Mid-Thirteenth-Century Dominican sequence repertory
- Musical exegesis in the sequences of Adam and the canons of St. Victor
- Katie Ann-Marie, Bugyis; Kraebel, A. B.; Fassler, Margot E., eds. (2017). Medieval Cantors and their Craft: Music, Liturgy and the Shaping of History, 800–1500. Suffolk: York Medieval Press. ISBN 978-1-903153-67-3.
