= List of professorships at the University of Oxford =

The coat of arms of the University of Oxford

This is a list of professorships at the University of Oxford. During the early history of the university, the title of professor meant a doctor who taught. From the 16th century, it was used for those holding a professorship, also known as a chair. The university has sometimes created professorships for an individual, the chair coming to an end when that individual dies or retires, and now awards titular professorships in the form of Titles of Distinction: these are not listed here. The Regius Professorships are royal chairs created by a reigning monarch. The first five (in civil law, divinity, medicine, Hebrew and Greek) are sometimes called the Henrician chairs.

== Notable professorships ==
- Abdulaziz Saud AlBabtain Laudian Professor of Arabic
- Action Research Professor of Clinical Neurology
- Agnelli-Serena Professor of Italian Studies
- Alastair Buchan Professor of International Relations
- Allen & Overy Professor of Corporate Law
- American Standard Companies Professor of Operations Management
- Andreas Idreos Professor of Science and Religion
- Andrew W. Mellon Professor of American Government
- Anne T. and Robert M. Bass Professorship of Developmental and Stem Cell Biology as Applied to Medicine
- Ashall Professor of the Foundations of Artificial Intelligence
- Ashall Professor of Infection & Immunity
- Barclay-Williams Professor of Molecular Immunology
- Barnett Professor of Social Policy
- Beit Professor of the History of the British Commonwealth
- Blavatnik Professor of Government and Public Policy
- Blavatnik Professor of Public Policy
- Boden Professor of Sanskrit
- BP Professor of Economics
- BP Professor of Information Engineering
- British Heart Foundation Professor of Cardiovascular Physiology
- Brownlee-Abraham Professor of Molecular Biology
- BT Professor of Major Programme Management
- Bywater and Sotheby Professor of Byzantine and Modern Greek Language and Literature
- Calouste Gulbenkian Professor of Armenian Studies
- Camden Professor of Ancient History
- Cameron Mackintosh Visiting Professor of Contemporary Theatre
- Cancer Research UK Professor of Medical Oncology
- César Milstein Professor of Cancer Cell Biology
- Charles Simonyi Professor of the Public Understanding of Science
- Cheryl and Reece Scott Professor of Psychiatry
- Chichele Professors
  - Chichele Professor of Economic History
  - Chichele Professor of Medieval History
  - Chichele Professor of Public International Law
  - Chichele Professor of Social and Political Theory
  - Chichele Professor of the History of War
- Christopher Strachey Professor of Computing
- Climax Professor of Clinical Therapeutics
- Corpus Christi Professor of Latin
- Coulson Professor of Theoretical Chemistry
- David Phillips Professor of Molecular Biophysics
- Dean Ireland's Professor of the Exegesis of Holy Scripture
- Diebold Professor of Comparative Philology
- Donald H Perkins Professor of Experimental Physics
- Donald Pollock Professor of Chemical Engineering
- Donald Schultz Professor of Turbomachinery
- Dr Lee's Professors
  - Dr Lee's Professor of Anatomy
  - Dr Lee's Professor of Experimental Philosophy (Physics)
  - Dr Lee's Professor of Chemistry
- Drue Heinz Professor of American Literature
- Drummond Professor of Political Economy
- Dubai Ports World Professorship of Entrepreneurship and Innovation
- E.P. Abraham Professor of Cell Biology
- E.P. Abraham Professor of Chemical Pathology
- E.P. Abraham Professor of Mechanistic Cell Biology
- Edgeworth Professor of Economics
- Edward Grey Professor of Field Ornithology
- Edward Hall Professor of Archaeological Science
- Edward Orsborn Professorship of US Politics and Political History
- Ernest Butten Professor of Management Studies
- Field Marshal Alexander Professor of Cardiovascular Medicine
- Freshfields Professorship of Commercial Law
- George Eastman Visiting Professor
- Gladstone Professor of Government
- Glaxo Professor of Cellular Pathology
- Goldsmiths' Professor of English Literature
- Halford Mackinder Professor of Geography
- Halley Professor of Physics
- Hans Krebs Professor of Physiological Metabolism
- Harold Vyvyan Harmsworth Professor of American History
- Heather Professor of Music
- Henry Moseley Centenary Professor of Experimental Physics
- Herbert Dunhill Professor of Neuro-imaging
- Herbert Smith Professor of English Private Law
- Hillary Rodham Clinton Professor in Women's History
- His Highness Sheikh Hamad Bin Khalifa Al Thani Professor in Contemporary Islamic Studies
- Hoffmann and Action Medical Research Professor in Developmental Medicine
- Hogan Lovells Professor of Law and Finance
- Hooke Professor of Experimental Physics
- Hope Professor of Zoology (Entomology)
- Ieoh Ming Pei Professor in Islamic Art and Architecture
- Isaac Wolfson Professor of Materials
- Iveagh Professor of Microbial Biochemistry
- J. R. R. Tolkien Professor of English Literature and Language
- Jacques Delors Professor of European Community Law
- James Meade Professor of Economics
- Jeremy Griffiths Professor of Medieval English Palaeography
- Jesus Professor of Celtic
- John Gilbert Winant Visiting Professor of American Government
- Kadoorie Professor of Trauma Rehabilitation
- Khalid bin Abdullah Al Saud Professor for the Study of the Contemporary Arab World
- King Alfonso XIII Professor of Spanish Studies
- King John II Professor of Portuguese Studies
- Lady Margaret Professor of Divinity
- Laing O'Rourke/RAEng Professor of Automation in Construction
- Lee Placito Professor of Gastroenterological Disease
- Lester B. Pearson Professor of International Relations
- Linacre Professor of Zoology
- Lincoln Professor of Classical Archaeology and Art
- Professor of Comparative Law
- Dame Louise Richardson Chair in Global Security
- L'Oréal Professor of Marketing
- Luc Hoffmann Professor of Field Ornithology
- Man Professor of Quantitative Finance
- Margaret Ogilvie's Professor of Ophthalmology
- Marshal Foch Professor of French Literature
- Masoumeh and Fereydoon Soudavar Professor of Persian Studies
- May Professor of Medicine
- Merton Professors
  - Merton Professor of English Language and Literature
  - Merton Professor of English Literature
- Michael Davys Professor of Neuroscience
- Montague Burton Professor of International Relations
- Newton-Abraham Visiting Professor
- Nissan Professor of Modern Japanese Studies
- Nolloth Professor of the Philosophy of the Christian Religion
- Norman Collisson Professor of Musculo-skeletal Pathology
- Nuffield Professors
  - Nuffield Professor of Anaesthetic Science
  - Nuffield Professor of Clinical Medicine
  - Nuffield Professor of Comparative Politics
  - Nuffield Professor of Economics
  - Nuffield Professor of Obstetrics and Gynaecology
  - Nuffield Professor of Orthopaedic Surgery
  - Nuffield Professor of Pathology
  - Nuffield Professor of Political Theory
  - Nuffield Professor of Population Health
  - Nuffield Professor of Primary Care Health Sciences
  - Nuffield Professor of Sociology
  - Nuffield Professor of Surgery
- Numata Professorship of Buddhist Studies
- Oriel and Laing Professor of the Interpretation of Holy Scripture
- Osler Professor of Medicine
- Peter Moores Professor of Management Studies
- Philip Wetton Professor of Astrophysics
- Pinsent Masons Professor of Taxation Law
- Professor of the Study of the Abrahamic Religions
- Professor of Egyptology
- Professor of Genetics
- Professor of Medieval German
- Professor of Jurisprudence
- Professor of Mathematical Finance
- Professor of Poetry
- Professor of the Analysis of Partial Differential Equations
- Professor of the Romance Languages
- Radcliffe Professor of Medicine
- Radcliffe Professor of Pathology
- Rawlinson and Bosworth Professor of Anglo-Saxon
- Regius Professors
  - Regius Professor of Civil Law
  - Regius Professor of Divinity
  - Regius Professor of Ecclesiastical History
  - Regius Professor of Greek
  - Regius Professor of Hebrew
  - Regius Professor of History
  - Regius Professor of Mathematics
  - Regius Professor of Medicine
  - Regius Professor of Moral and Pastoral Theology
- Rhodes Professor of American History
- Rhodes Professor of Experimental Therapeutics and Clinical Pharmacology
- Rhodes Professor of Race Relations
- Rhodes Professor of the Laws of the British Commonwealth and the United States
- Richard Doll Professorship of Epidemiology and Medicine
- Robert Turner Professor of Diabetic Medicine
- Rouse Ball Professor of Mathematics
- Rupert Murdoch Professor of Language and Communication
- Savilian Professor of Astronomy
- Savilian Professor of Geometry
- Sedleian Professor of Natural Philosophy
- Sekyra and White's Professor of Moral Philosophy
- Shaw Professor of Chinese
- Sherardian Professor of Botany
- Sibthorpian Professor of Plant Science
- Sidney Truelove Professor of Gastroenterology
- Sir John Hicks Professor of Economics
- Slade Professor of Fine Art
- Spalding Professor of Eastern Religions and Ethics
- Tasso Leventis Chair of Biodiversity
- Taylor Professor of the German Language and Literature
- Technikos Professor of Biomedical Engineering
- Technology Law
- Thomas Warton Professor of English Literature
- Vesuvius Professorship of Materials
- Vinerian Professor of English Law
- Visiting Professor of Opera Studies
- W.A. Handley Professor of Psychiatry
- Wallis Professor of Mathematics
- Watts Professor of Psychology
- Waynflete Professors
  - Waynflete Professor of Chemistry
  - Waynflete Professor of Metaphysical Philosophy
  - Waynflete Professor of Physiology
  - Waynflete Professor of Pure Mathematics
- Whitehead Professor of Pure Mathematics
- Whitley Professor of Biochemistry
- Wilde Professor of Mental Philosophy
- Wood Professor of Forest Science
- Wykeham Professors
  - Wykeham Professor of Ancient History
  - Wykeham Professor of Logic
  - Tencent-Wykeham Professor of Physics

== See also ==
- Title of Distinction
- List of professorships at the University of Cambridge
