= J. W. B. Barns =

British Egyptologist

- Born: John Wintour Baldwin Barns; 12 May 1912; Bristol, England
- Died: 23 February 1974 (aged 61)
- Occupations: Academic and Anglican clergy
- Title: Professor of Egyptology (1965–1974)
- Spouse: Dorothy (m. 1954)

Academic background
- Education: Fairfield School
- Alma mater: University of Bristol; Corpus Christi College, Oxford; St Stephen's House, Oxford
- Thesis: The character and use of anthologies among the Greek literary papyri: together with an edition of some unpublished papyri (1946)
- Doctoral advisor: C. H. Roberts

Academic work
- Discipline: Egyptology and Classics
- Sub-discipline: Papyrology
- Institutions: University of Oxford; University College, Oxford; The Queen's College, Oxford

John Wintour Baldwin Barns (12 May 1912 – 23 February 1974) was a British Egyptologist, papyrologist, Anglican priest, and academic. From 1965 to 1974, he was Professor of Egyptology at the University of Oxford.

== Early life and education ==
Barns was born on 12 May 1912 in Bristol, England. Having won a scholarship, he was educated at Fairfield School, then a private school on Bristol. Though he had an interest in Egyptology from an early age, since the discover of Tutankhamun's tomb in 1922, his father encouraged him to study classics. He taught himself Ancient Greek because it was not a subject available at his school.

At the age of 17, Barns matriculated into the University of Bristol to study classics. He graduated with a Bachelor of Arts (BA) degree in 1932. He then matriculated into Corpus Christi College, Oxford to study Literae Humaniores. He was elected to a classical scholarship in 1933. He achieved first class honours in Mods (i.e. Latin and Ancient Greek) in April 1935. He then approached Battiscombe Gunn, the Professor of Egyptology at Oxford, to ask if he could study Egyptology as the second half of his degree; he was refused as Gunn thought it was too early in Barns' academic studies to move into the subject. He continued with his classics degree, studying Greats. He graduated with a further BA degree; as per tradition, his BA was promoted to a Master of Arts (MA Oxon) in 1942.

After completing his second undergraduate degree, Barns began studying Greek papyrology under C. H. Roberts in preparation for a doctorate. His studies were interrupted by World War II. His doctoral thesis, which he submitted in 1946, was titled "The character and use of anthologies among the Greek literary papyri: together with an edition of some unpublished papyri". He completed his Doctor of Philosophy (DPhil) degree in 1947.

== Career ==
=== Service during World War II ===
During World War II, Barns worked in military intelligence. Between 1940 and 1945, he served at Bletchley Park. He worked in Hut 4 (analysing naval intelligence gleaned from cracked Enigma and Hagelin messages), Hut 5 (military intelligence focusing on Italian, Spanish, and Portuguese ciphers), and Block A (Naval Intelligence). He reached the rank of Temporary Senior Assistant Officer.

=== Academic career ===
In 1945, after the end of World War II, Barns returned to the University of Oxford having been appointed the Lady Wallis Budge Research Fellow in Egyptology at University College, Oxford. He worked with and was mentored by Battiscombe Gunn (the then Professor of Egyptology) for the next five years, until Gunn's death in 1950. He continued to hold the Lady Wallis Budge Fellowship until 1953. During this period of his career, he worked with a wide range of original texts covering most stages of the Egyptian language; from hieroglyphic stelae dating to the Second Intermediate Period to Coptic papyri from the Ptolemaic Period. His research during this time produced two books, The Ashmolean Ostracon of Sinuhe (1952) and Five Ramesseum Papyri (1956), in addition to a number of journal articles.

In 1953, Barns was appointed Senior Lecturer in Papyrology. This meant moving away from Egyptology to teach Ancient Greek papyrology in the Faculty of Literae Humaniores. He published a number of previously untranslated papyri over the next few years, including some papyri from excavations at Oxyrynchus.

On 1 October 1965, Barns was appointed Professor of Egyptology at the University of Oxford, in succession to Jaroslav Černý. He held the post until his sudden death in 1974.

=== Ordained ministry ===
During the 1950s, Barns found himself more and more interested in theology. This led him to seek ordination, and he trained for Holy Orders at St Stephen's House, Oxford, an Anglo-Catholic theological college. He was ordained in the Church of England as a deacon in 1955 and as a priest in 1956. It is not known if he held any religious appointments, but he did give sermons; a number were published after his death in a book titled John Wintour Baldwin Barns: Priest and Scholar (1912–1974).

== Death ==
Barns died suddenly on 23 February 1974. He was aged 61.

== Personal life ==
In 1954, Barns married Dorothy Eileen Constance Sturges. They did not have any children.

== Selected works ==
- Barns, John W. B. (1952). The Ashmolean ostracon of Sinuhe. Oxford: Oxford University Press.
- Barns, John W. B. (1956). Five Ramesseum papyri. Oxford: Oxford University Press.
- Barns, John W. B. (1961). The placing of papyrus fragments. Oslo: Norwegian University Press.
- Barns, J. W. B.; Parsans, P. J.; Rea, John; Turner, E. G. (1966). The Oxyrhynchus Papyri. Part XXXI. London: Egypt Exploration Society.
- Reymond, E. A. E.; Barns, J. W. B. (1973). Embalmer's Archives from Hawara: Catalogue of Demotic Papyri in the Ashmolean Museum. Oxford: Griffith Institute.
- Reymond, E. A. E.; Barns, J. W. B., eds. (1973). Four martyrdoms from the Pierpont Morgan Coptic codices. Oxford: Clarendon Press. ISBN 9780198154488.
- Barns, John W. B. (1978). Egyptians and Greeks: Inaugural lecture delivered before the University of Oxford on 25 November 1966. Brussels: Fondation Égyptologique Reine Élisabeth.
- Barns, J. W. B.; Browne, G. M.; Shelton, J. C., eds. (1981). Nag Hammadi Codices: Greek and Coptic Papyri from the Cartonnage of the Covers. Leiden: Brill. ISBN 978-9004062771.

Academic offices
| Preceded by Jaroslav Černý | Professor of Egyptology; University of Oxford; 1965 to 1974 | Succeeded by John Baines |
