= Faculty of Asian and Middle Eastern Studies =

Department of the University of Oxford

Coordinates: 51°45′21″N 1°15′39″W

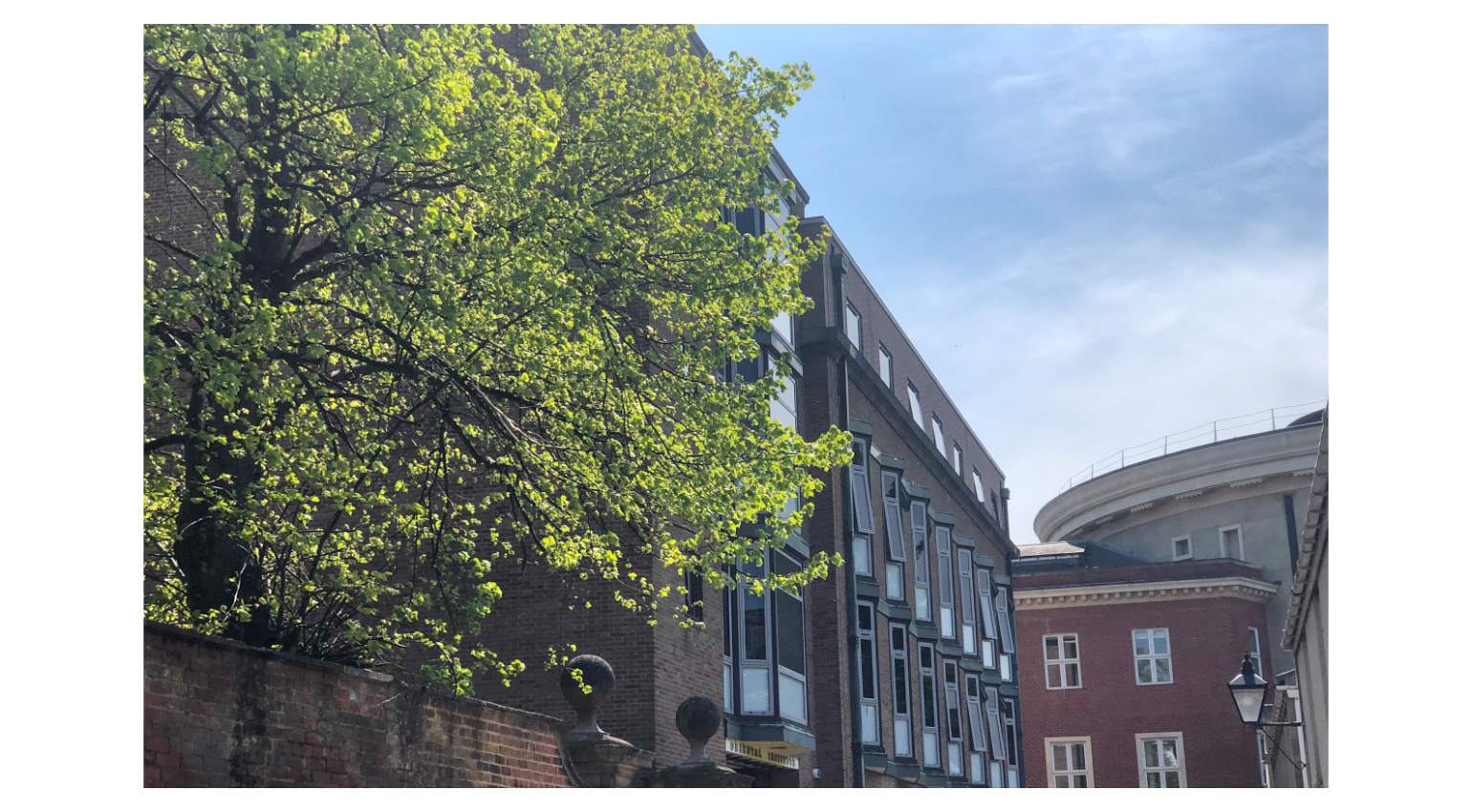
Faculty of Asian and Middle Eastern Studies, University of Oxford

The Faculty of Asian and Middle Eastern Studies, formerly the Faculty of Oriental Studies, is an academic department of the Humanities Division at the University of Oxford in Oxford, England, United Kingdom.

The faculty is engaged in a broad range of research and teaching on modern and historical Asian and Middle Eastern studies, focusing on politics, language, and culture. The faculty's main building is located on Pusey Lane near the Ashmolean Museum and Sackler Library, with some research centres of the faculty having their own buildings elsewhere in Oxford (such as the Middle East Centre based at St. Antony's College, Oxford). The faculty is part of the Humanities Division at the University of Oxford. The Nizami Ganjavi Library is the faculty's own library for students and professors, which is both a lending library and a reading room of the Bodleian Library.

== 2022 name change ==
The former name of the faculty and institute had been the subject of longstanding criticism for the continued usage of the term "Oriental", levied from a increasing support of postcolonialism in the humanities. The academic awareness of the term evolved substantially from the 1960s onward and entered broader public awareness with the publication of Orientalism in 1978 by Palestinian author and academic Edward Said, along with his coining the titular topic. Beginning in 2020, the Faculty Board began a review of the name, open to comments from students, faculty, and other affiliated parties. Many public and private institutions had made similar changes from the turn of the millennium onwards. For example, in 2007 Cambridge University changed the name of its Faculty of Oriental Studies to the Faculty of Asian and Middle Eastern Studies. The movement for changing the name was ultimately successful after two years of commentary, and on 1 August 2022 it was officially changed to the Faculty of Asian and Middle Eastern Studies.

== Sub-faculties ==
The faculty is divided into three sub-faculties based on subject area, including:

- Sub-Faculty of Middle Eastern Studies, which covers
  - Department of the Islamic World
  - Department of Modern Middle Eastern Studies
  - Department of Hebrew and Jewish Studies (also based at the Oxford Centre for Hebrew and Jewish Studies)
  - Department of Egyptology and Ancient Near Eastern Studies (also based at the Griffith Institute)
- Sub-Faculty of South and Inner Asian Studies, which covers
  - Hindi and Urdu politics, language, and culture
  - Sanskrit (classical and Vedic)
  - Tibetan and Himalayan Cultural Studies
- Sub-Faculty of East Asian Studies (also based at the Eastern Art Department of the Ashmolean Museum), which covers
  - Chinese (based at the University of Oxford China Centre, Canterbury Road)
  - Japanese (also based at the Nissan Institute of Japanese Studies, Winchester Road)
  - Korean, politics, and culture

== Notable people ==
Statutory professorships (as of 2024):

- Regius Professor of Hebrew – vacant
- Laudian Professor of Arabic – Tahera Qutbuddin
- Professor of Egyptology – Richard B. Parkinson
- Boden Professor of Sanskrit – James Mallinson
- Calouste Gulbenkian Professor of Armenian Studies – Theo Maarten van Lint
- Spalding Professor of Eastern Religion and Ethics – Diwakar Acharya
- I.M. Pei Professor of Islamic Art and Architecture – Alain Fouad George
- Stanley Ho Professor of Chinese History – Henrietta Harrison
- Soudavar Professor of Persian Studies – Edmund Herzig
- Yehan Numata Professor of Buddhist Studies – Stefano Zacchetti
- Khalid bin Abdullah Al Saud Professor for the Study of the Contemporary Arab World – Marilyn Booth
- HH Sheikh Hamad Bin Khalifa Al Thani Professor of Contemporary Islamic Studies – Raihan Ismail

Other notable current academics:

- Martin Goodman
- Christopher Melchert
- Judith Olszowy-Schlanger
- Eugene Rogan
