= Spalding Trust =

British charitable organisation

The Spalding Trust is a charitable organisation based in Stowmarket, England. Its mandate is to promote intercultural understanding by encouraging the study of comparative religion.

Mr. and Mrs. H.N. Spalding established the Trust by means of two trust deeds in 1923 and 1928. The Trust has made grants to individuals, institutions and libraries. Among its benefactions have been the Spalding Chair in Eastern Religions and Ethics and the Spalding Lectureship in Eastern Orthodox Studies, both in the Faculty of Oriental Studies at the University of Oxford. The Trust also gave several grants to the School of Oriental Studies at the University of Durham in the 1950s. A Spalding Visiting Fellowship in Comparative Religion was established at Clare Hall, Cambridge in 1994.

The Trust's website presents the scope of projects supported, and instructions for individuals applying for assistance.

The Spalding Trust's chairs have included Sir Douglas Veale (1950-1953) and Thomas Knox-Shaw (1953-1971).

The Ellen Rebe Spalding Memorial Fund was set up by H. N. Spalding in memory of his mother. It is a subdivision within the Spalding Trust. Grants from this fund, totalling approximately £2000 annually, are used to help women and children in the family's home county of Oxfordshire.
