= Alexis Sanderson =

English indologist (born 1948)

Alexis G. J. S. Sanderson (born 1948) is an English indologist and Emeritus Fellow of All Souls College at the University of Oxford.

== Early life ==
After taking undergraduate degrees in Classics and Sanskrit at Balliol College from 1968 to 1971, Alexis Sanderson spent six years in Kashmir studying with the scholar and Śaiva guru Swami Lakshman Joo. From 1971-1974 he was a Senior Scholar at Merton College, Oxford, and from 1974-1977 he held a Junior Research Fellowship at Brasenose College, Oxford. From 1977 to 1992 he was University Lecturer in Sanskrit and a Fellow of Wolfson College.

== Career ==
In 1992 he was appointed to the Spalding Chair of Eastern Religions and Ethics and became a Fellow of All Souls. He retired in 2015.

Sanderson is a scholar of Sanskrit and of Indian religions, especially of Shaivism and esoteric Śaiva Tantra, commonly (but not quite correctly) known as Kashmir Shaivism. He has written as an authority on this subject and many of his studies are publicly available through his personal website. Sanderson's published articles, resting on a critical reading of the Sanskrit sources, especially in manuscript, are often cited by European and American scholars.

== Selected publications ==
- "The Śaiva Age — The Rise and Dominance of Śaivism during the Early Medieval Period." In:Genesis and Development of Tantrism, edited by Shingo Einoo, Tokyo: University of Tokyo, Institute of Oriental Culture, March 2009, pp. 41–349.
- "Atharvavedins in Tantric Territory: The Āngirasakalpa Texts of the Oriya Paippalādins and their Connection with the Trika and the Kālīkula, with critical editions of the Parājapavidhi, the Parāmantravidhi, and the *Bhadrakālī-mantravidhiprakarana." In: The Atharvaveda and its Paippalāda Śākhā: Historical and Philological Papers on a Vedic Tradition, edited by Arlo Griffiths and Annette Schmiedchen. Aachen: Shaker Verlag, 2007. Geisteskultur Indiens: Texte und Studien, 11, Indologica Halensis, pp. 195–311.
- "The Śaiva Exegesis of Kashmir." In: Mélanges tantriques à la mémoire d’Hélène Brunner / Tantric Studies in Memory of Hélène Brunner, edited by Dominic Goodall and André Padoux, Pondicherry: Institut français d’Indologie / École française d’Extrême-Orient, 2007. Collection Indologie 106, pp. 231–442 and (bibliography) pp. 551–582.
- "Swami Lakshman Joo and His Place in the Kashmirian Śaiva Tradition." In: Samvidullāsah, edited by Bettina Bäumer and Sarla Kumar, New Delhi: D.K. Printworld, 2007, pp. 93–126.
- "The Lākulas: New evidence of a system intermediate between Pāñcārthika Pāśupatism and Āgamic Śaivism." Ramalinga Reddy Memorial Lectures, 1997. In: The Indian Philosophical Annual 24 (2006), pp. 143–217.
- "Religion and the State: Śaiva Officiants in the Territory of the Brahmanical Royal Chaplain (with an appendix on the provenance and date of the Netratantra)." In: Indo-Iranian Journal 47 (2004), pp. 229–300.
- "A Commentary on the Opening Verses of the Tantrasāra of Abhinavagupta." In Sāmarasya: Studies in Indian Arts, Philosophy, and Interreligious Dialogue in Honour of Bettina Bäumer, ed. Sadananda Das and Ernst Fürlinger. New Delhi: D.K. Printworld (2005), pp. 89–148.
- "The Śaiva Religion Among the Khmers, Part I." In: Bulletin de l’Ecole française d’Extrême-Orient, 90-91 (2003–2004), pp. 349–463.
- "Remarks on the Text of the Kubjikāmatatantra." In: Indo-Iranian Journal 45, (2002), pp. 1–24.
- "History through Textual Criticism in the study of Śaivism, the Pañcarātra and the Buddhist Yoginītantras." In: Les Sources et le temps. Sources and Time: A Colloquium, Pondicherry, 11–13 January 1997, edited by François Grimal. Publications du département d’Indologie 91. Pondicherry: Institut Français de Pondichéry/École Française d’Extrême-Orient (2001), pp. 1–47.
- "Meaning in Tantric Ritual." In: Essais sur le Rituel III: Colloque du Centenaire de la Section des Sciences religieuses de l’École Pratique des Hautes Études, edited by A.-M. Blondeau and K. Schipper. Bibliothèque de l’École des Hautes Études, Sciences Religieuses, Volume CII. Louvain-Paris: Peeters (1995), pp. 15–95.
- "Vajrayāna: Origin and Function". In: Buddhism into the Year 2000. International Conference Proceedings, Bangkok and Los Angeles: Dhammakāya Foundation (1995), pp. 89–102.
- "The Doctrine of the Mālinīvijayottaratantra." In: Ritual and Speculation in Early Tantrism. Studies in Honour of André Padoux, ed. T. Goudriaan. Albany: State University of New York Press (1992), pp. 281–312.
- "The Visualization of the Deities of the Trika." In: L’Image Divine: Culte et Méditation dans l’Hindouisme, edited by A. Padoux. Paris: Éditions du Centre National de la Recherche Scientifique (1990), pp. 31–88.
- "Śaivism and the Tantric Traditions." In: The World’s Religions, edited by S. Sutherland, L. Houlden, P. Clarke and F. Hardy. London: Routledge and Kegan Paul (1988), pp. 660–704. Reprinted in The World’s Religions: The Religions of Asia, edited by F. Hardy. London: Routledge and Kegan Paul (1990), pp. 128–72.
- "Mandala and Āgamic Identity in the Trika of Kashmir." In: Mantras et Diagrammes Rituelles dans l’Hindouisme, ed. Andre Padoux. Équipe no. 249 ‘L’hindouisme: textes, doctrines, pratiques.’ Paris: Éditions du Centre National de la Recherche Scientifique (1986), pp. 169–214.
- "Purity and Power among the Brāhmans of Kashmir." In: The Category of the Person: Anthropology, Philosophy, History, eds. M. Carrithers, S. Collins and S. Lukes. Cambridge: Cambridge University Press (1985), pp. 190–216.
