= Hagelin =

Hagelin may refer to:

- Albert Viljam Hagelin (1881–1946), Norwegian World War II collaborationist and minister
- Bobbie Hagelin (born 1984), Swedish hockey player
- Boris Hagelin (1892–1983), Swedish businessman and inventor of a cryptography machine (see M-209)
- Carl Hagelin (born 1988), Swedish hockey player
- Dagmar Hagelin (1959 – c. 1977), Argentine-Swedish girl who disappeared during the Dirty Wars
- Gustaf Hagelin (1897–1983), Swedish horse rider
- Joakim Hagelin (born 1989), Swedish ice hockey player
- John Hagelin (born 1954), US scientist and politician
- Robert Hagelin (1884 – after 1938), Norwegian politician
