= Tomb of Nebamun =

Ancient Egyptian tomb

- Burial site of Nebamun
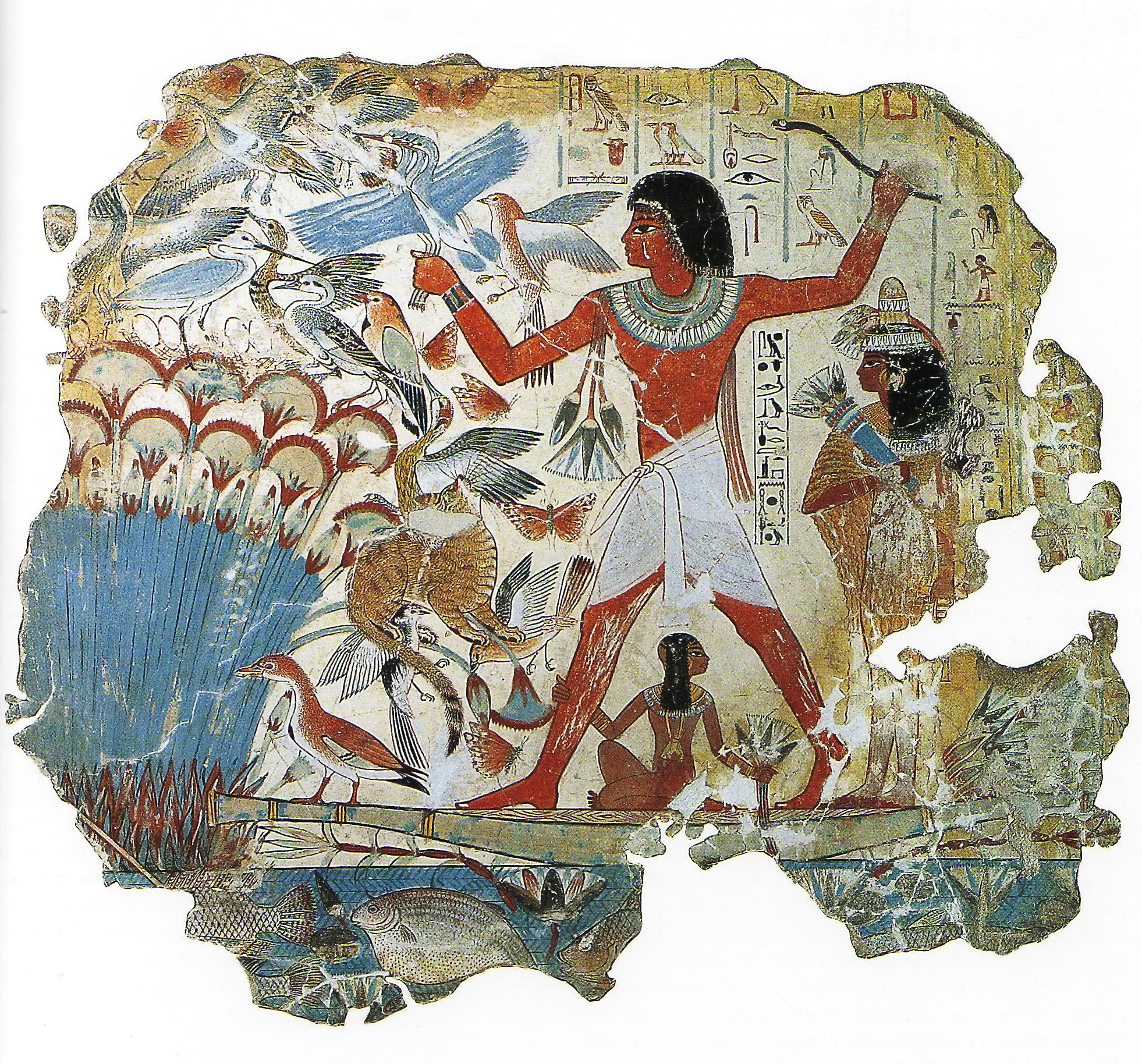
- Fowling scene
- Location: Original location in Theban Necropolis unknown, several parts now present in British Museum
- Discovered: 1820
- Excavated by: Giovanni (Yanni) d'Athanasi

The lost Tomb of Nebamun was an ancient Egyptian tomb from the Eighteenth Dynasty located in the Theban Necropolis on the west bank of the Nile at Thebes (present-day Luxor in Egypt). The tomb was the source of a number of famous decorated tomb scenes that are currently on display in the British Museum, London.

The location of the tomb was not revealed at the time of its discovery in order to maintain secrecy during a period of competition between excavators, and was since lost. Scientific analysis in 2008–09 indicated the tomb's location in the vicinity of Dra' Abu el-Naga'.

== Discovery ==
Nebamun, who lived around 1350 BCE, was a middle-ranking official scribe and grain counter at the temple complex in Thebes. His tomb was discovered around 1820 by a young Greek, Giovanni ("Yanni") d'Athanasi, who at the time was working for Henry Salt, the British Consul-General.

== Excavated artifacts ==
The tomb's plastered walls were richly and skilfully decorated with lively fresco paintings, depicting idealised views of Nebamun's life and activities. D'Athanasi and his workmen hacked out the pieces he wanted with knives, saws and crowbars. Salt sold these works to the British Museum in 1821, though some of the other fragments became located in Berlin and possibly Cairo. D'Athanasi later died in poverty without ever revealing the tomb's exact location.

The best-known of the tomb's paintings include Nebamun fowl hunting in the marshes, dancing girls at a banquet, and a pond in a garden. In 2009, the British Museum opened a new gallery dedicated to the display of the restored eleven wall fragments from the tomb. They have been described as the greatest paintings from ancient Egypt to have survived, and as one of the Museum's greatest treasures.

Various scenes from the paintings have been used by artists in more modern times. Lawrence Alma-Tadema incorporated a scene of geese herding for a wall decoration depicted in his Joseph, Overseer of Pharaoh's Granary (1874), and Paul Gauguin used part of a banquet scene as a compositional plan in his paintings Ta Matete and Vairumati tei Oa (1892)

== Gallery ==
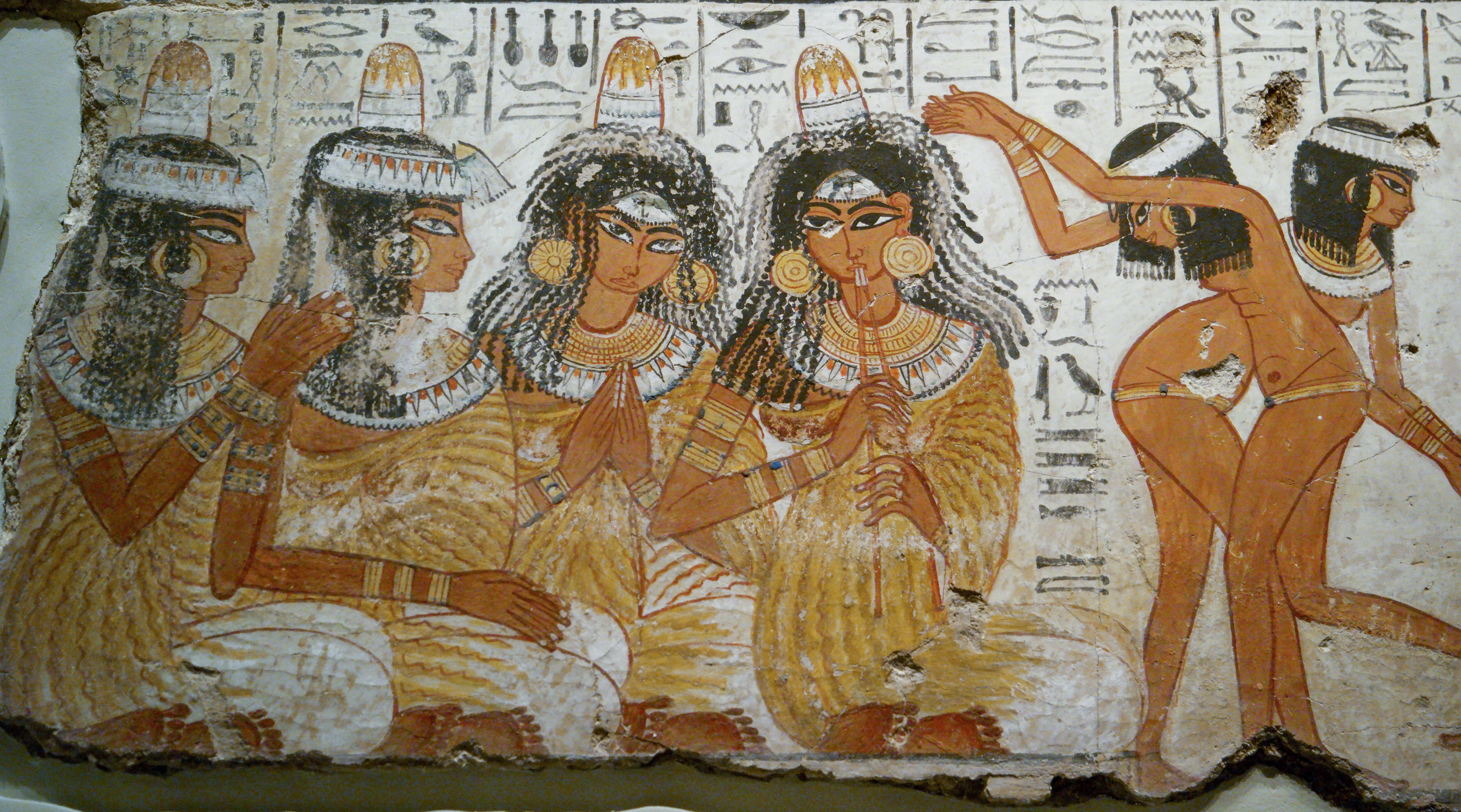
Dancers and musicians

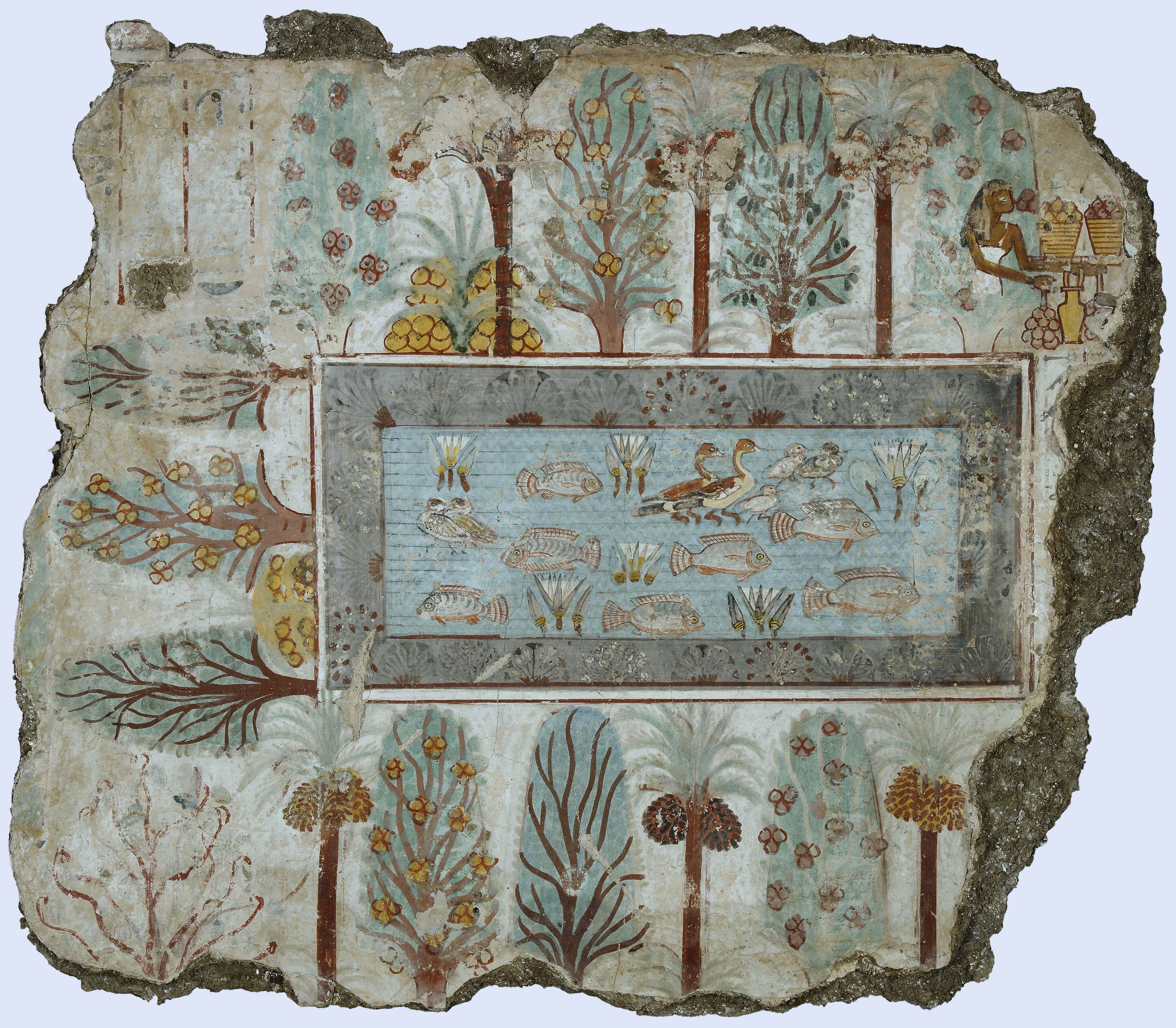
Pond in a Garden showing date-palms, sycamore trees and a pool teeming with life; the sycamore goddess with her produce, is shown at top right.

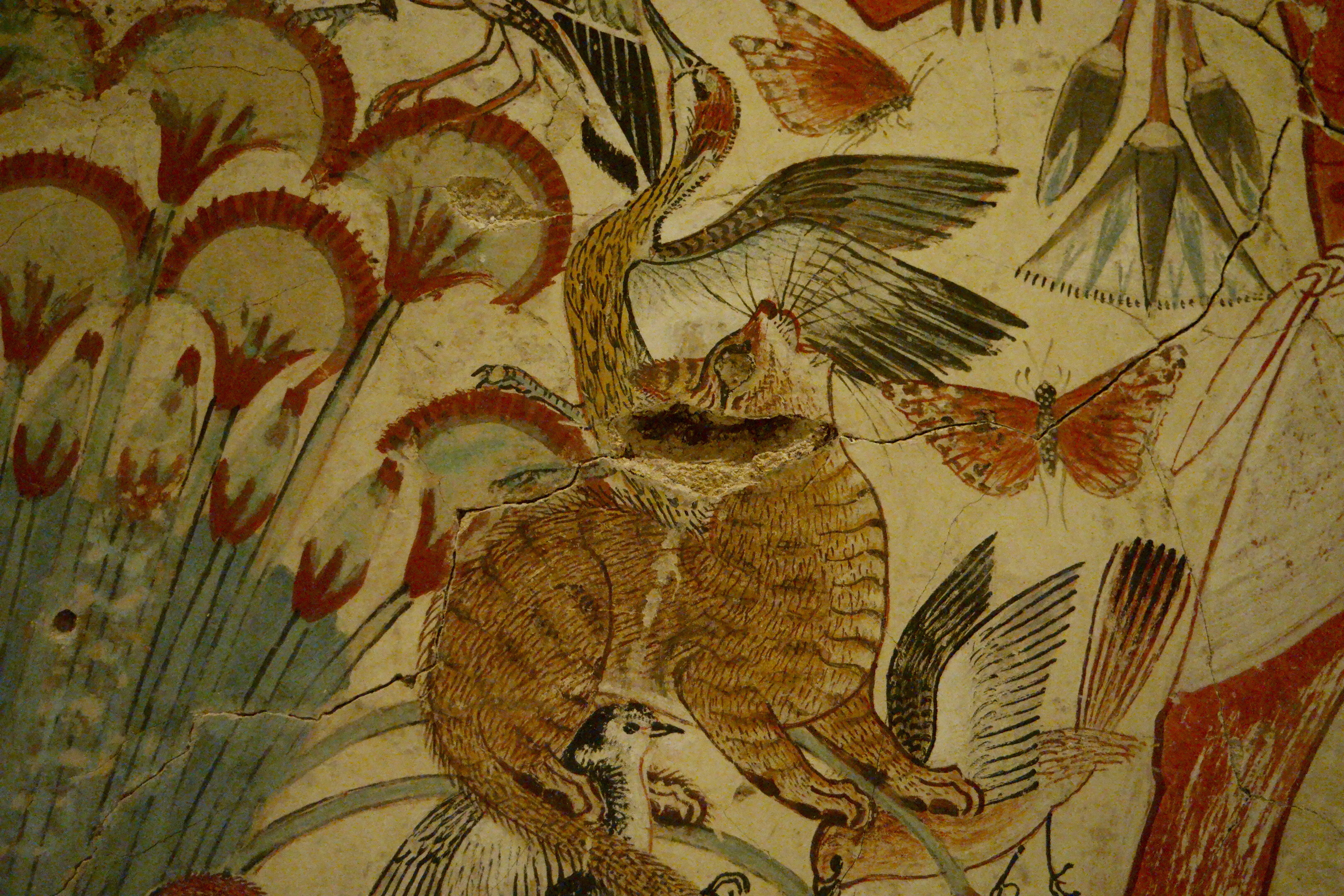
Cat attacking birds

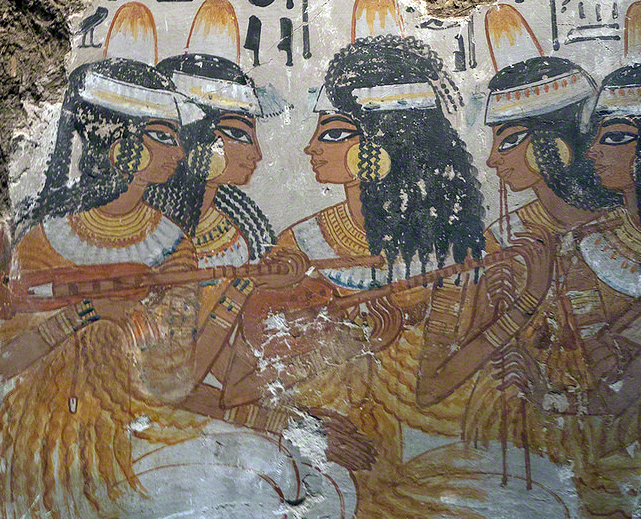
Musicians playing Egyptian lutes.

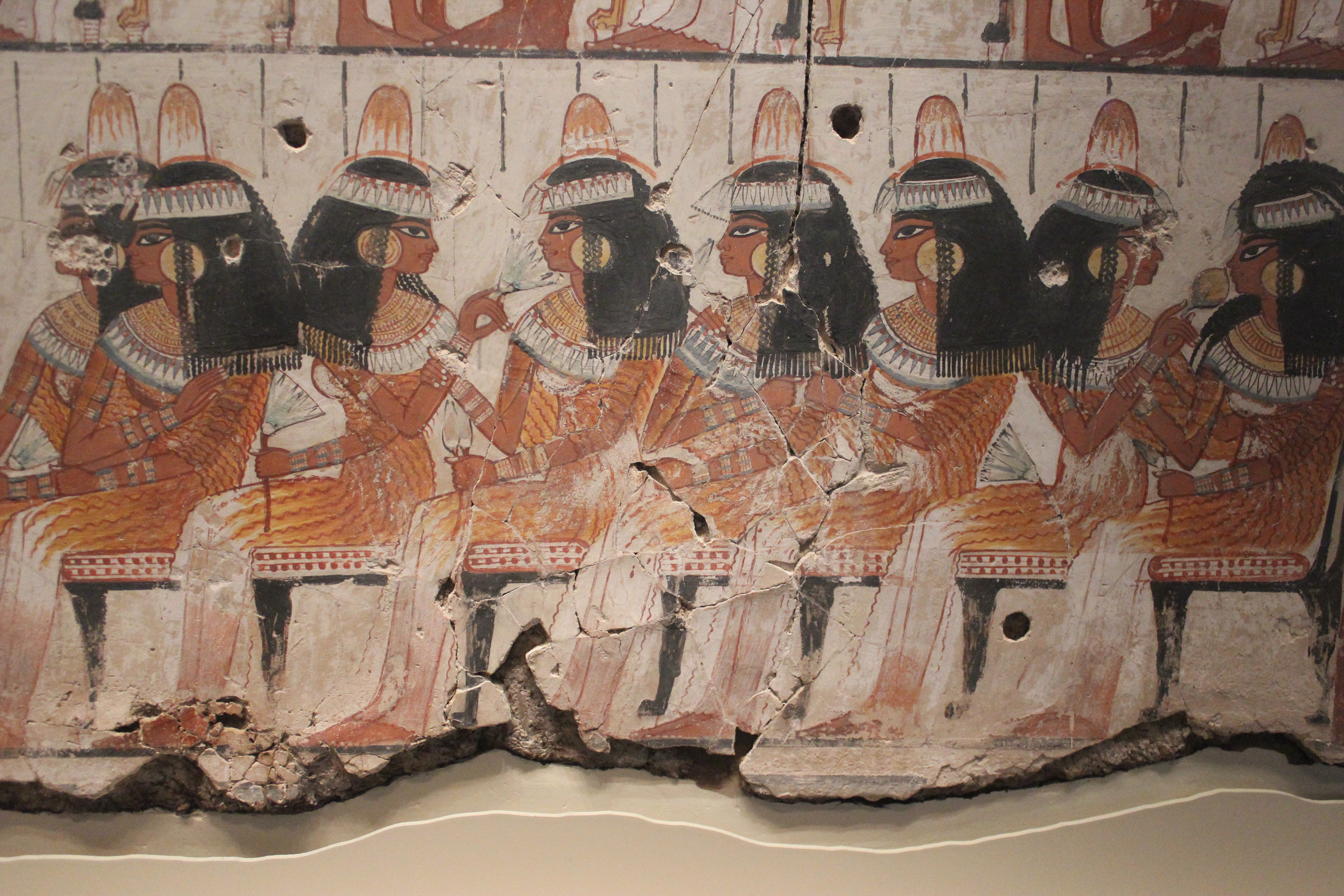
Tomb of Nebamun, Banquet

== Bibliography ==
- Parkinson, Richard B. (2008). The Painted Tomb Chapel of Nebamun. British Museum Press. p. 152. ISBN 9780714119793.
