= Richard B. Parkinson =

British Egyptologist and academic (born 1963)

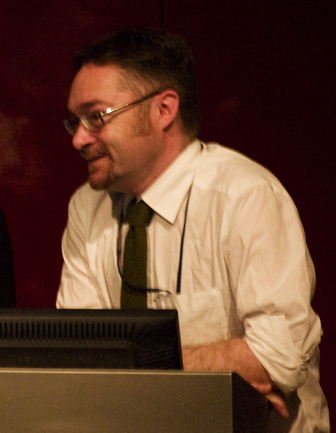
- Parkinson at the Egyptological Colloquium in 2009
- Born: Richard Bruce Parkinson; 25 May 1963 (age 63)
- Spouse: Timothy Griffiths Reid (m. 2005)

Academic background
- Education: University of Oxford (BA, DPhil)

Academic work
- Discipline: Egyptology
- Sub-discipline: Egyptian hieroglyphs; Ancient Egyptian literature; Epigraphy
- Institutions: Oriental Institute, University of Oxford; British Museum; University College, Oxford; The Queen's College, Oxford

Richard Bruce Parkinson (born 25 May 1963) is a British Egyptologist and academic. He is Professor of Egyptology at the University of Oxford and a fellow of The Queen's College, Oxford. Until December 2013, he was a curator in the Department of Ancient Egypt and Sudan, British Museum.

== Early life and Education ==
Parkinson was born on 25 May 1963. He was educated at Barnard Castle School, then an all-boys private school in Barnard Castle, County Durham. He read Oriental Studies (Egyptology with Coptic) at The Queen's College, University of Oxford, and graduated in 1985 with a first class Bachelor of Arts (BA) degree. He then undertook research for his Doctor of Philosophy (DPhil) degree. His doctoral thesis was a commentary on The Tale of the Eloquent Peasant and was submitted in 1988.

== Academic Carrer ==
Parkinson was a Teaching Fellow at the Oriental Institute, University of Oxford from 1988 to 1989. From 1989 to 1991, he worked at the Department of Egyptian Antiquities, British Museum as a Special Assistant in epigraphy. He then became the Lady Wallis Budge Junior Research Fellow in Egyptology at University College, Oxford.

In 1991, Parkinson became a curator of the British Museum as Assistant Keeper of Ancient Egyptian pharaonic culture. His responsibilities included the maintenance and publication of ancient papyri written in Egyptian hieroglyphs and cursive hieratic, as well as inscribed material such as the Rosetta Stone. He was the supervisor of archived material, collections, and epigraphy, and the curator of the Nebamun wall-paintings. He remained at the British Museum until the end of 2013.

On 1 October 2013, Parkinson was appointed statutory Professor of Egyptology in the Faculty of Oriental Studies, University of Oxford. Spending the first term part-time, he took on the position full-time in January 2014. His inaugural lecture about the impact of ancient Egyptian poetry was accompanied by the actress and novelist Barbara Ewing, and was podcast. He is a professorial fellow of the Queen's College, Oxford, and has been a director and co-director of the Griffith Institute, Oxford.

From 1993 to 1998, Parkinson was editor of the Journal of Egyptian Archaeology. He has been a visiting lecturer at the University of Göttingen in 2006, at the University of Cologne in 2009 and 2013, and the University of Mainz in 2011. In 2022, he was lead curator of the Bodleian libraries exhibition 'Tutankhamun: Excavating the archive', commemorating the discovery of the tomb of Tutankhamun with a display of the excavation's records in the Griffith Institute, Oxford, and editor of the accompanying publication.

Parkinson's main area of research is the interpretation of Ancient Egyptian literature. As well as the philological study of manuscripts, he works on material contexts, actors’ perspectives, literary theory and modern receptions in literature, art and film; he also works on the history of Ancient Egyptian mathematics with Christopher D. Hollings. As well as academic monographs and articles, he has written popular books on Egyptology and also a short LGBT world history, dedicated to his husband. In 2016 he gave the Oxford University annual LGBT History Month lecture on this, which was podcast: https://podcasts.ox.ac.uk/great-unrecorded-history-lgbt-heritage-and-world-cultures. In 2004 he collaborated in a translation of Beatrix Potter's The Tale of Peter Rabbit into hieroglyphs.

== Honours ==
Parkinson was awarded an honorary doctorate from the New Bulgarian University, Sofia in 2006 for his contributions to Egyptology.

== Personal life ==
Parkinson is openly gay. He entered into a civil partnership with Timothy Griffiths Reid in 2005, and this was converted into marriage in 2014.

Parkinson has type 1 diabetes and has spoken about the intense difficulties of this condition in the competitive academic environment of Oxford, and also those posed by sexuality in his Faculty.

== Bibliography ==
Books

- Parkinson, R B (1991), The Tale of the eloquent Peasant, Griffith Institute, ISBN 978-0-900416-60-6, OCLC 491658742
- Parkinson, R B (1991), Voices from ancient Egypt : an anthology of Middle Kingdom writings, British Museum, ISBN 978-0-7141-0961-9, OCLC 22661254
- Parkinson, R B (1999), The Tale of Sinuhe and other ancient Egyptian poems, 1940-1640 BC, New York, ISBN 978-0-19-283966-4, OCLC 317507143
- Parkinson, R B; Diffie, Whitfield; Fischer, M; Simpson, R S (1999), Cracking codes : the Rosetta stone and decipherment, University of California Press, ISBN 978-0-520-22248-9, OCLC 42354255
- Parkinson, R B (2002), Poetry and culture in Middle Kingdom Egypt : a dark side to perfection, Athlone publications in Egyptology and ancient Near Eastern studies, Continuum, ISBN 978-0-8264-5637-3, OCLC 47623966
- Parkinson, R B (2005), The Rosetta Stone, British Museum objects in focus, British Museum Press, ISBN 978-0-7141-5021-5
- Parkinson, R B (2008), The painted tomb-chapel of Nebamun : masterpieces of ancient Egyptian art in the British Museum, British Museum Press, ISBN 978-0-7141-1979-3, OCLC 183148177
- Parkinson, R.B. (2009), Reading ancient egyptian poetry : among other histories, Wiley-Blackwell, ISBN 978-1-4051-2547-5, OCLC 237788746
- Parkinson, R.B. (2012), The Tale of the Eloquent Peasant: A reader's commentary, Lingua Aegyptia, ISBN 978-3-943955-10-1
- Parkinson, R.B. (2012), The Ramesseum Papyri. Online Research Catalogue, archived from the original on 1 August 2019
- Parkinson, R.B. (2012), Four 12th Dynasty Literary Papyri (Pap. Berlin P. 3022–5): A Photographic Record, Akademie Verlag
- Parkinson, R.B. (2013), A Little gay history : desire and diversity across the world, British Museum Press, ISBN 978-0-7141-5100-7, archived from the original on 20 December 2016
- Parkinson, R.B. (with Barbara Ewing) (2016), The Life of Sinuhe
- Parkinson, R.B. (with Barbara Ewing) (2019), Talking with the Soul: A Dialogue about Life and Death
- Parkinson, R.B. (2022), Tutankhamun: Excavating the archive, Bodleian Publishing, ISBN 978-1-851245-85-7

Articles

- Parkinson, R B (1992), "Literary Form and the "Tale of the Eloquent Peasant"", The Journal of Egyptian Archaeology, 78: 163–178, doi:10.2307/3822070, ISSN 0307-5133, JSTOR 3822070, OCLC 480080131
- Schofield, L; Parkinson, R B (1994), "Of Helmets and Heretics: A Possible Egyptian Representation of Mycenaean Warriors on a Papyrus from El-Amarna", The Annual of the British School at Athens, 89: 157–170, doi:10.1017/s0068245400015343, ISSN 0068-2454, JSTOR 30102567, OCLC 486343916, S2CID 162304174
- Parkinson, R B (1995), "'Homosexual' Desire and Middle Kingdom Literature", The Journal of Egyptian Archaeology, 81: 57–76, doi:10.2307/3821808, ISSN 0307-5133, JSTOR 3821808, OCLC 480085518
- Parkinson, R B (1997), "A Re-Identified Fragment from the Tomb of Ibi (TT 36)", The Journal of Egyptian Archaeology, 83: 222–223, doi:10.1177/030751339708300115, ISSN 0307-5133, JSTOR 3822469, OCLC 480089488, S2CID 192190944
- Parkinson, R B (with B. Leach) (2010), "Creating Borders: New Insights into Making the Papyrus of Ani", BMSAES, 15, archived from the original on 1 August 2019
- Parkinson, R B (with M. Downiing) (2016), "The Tomb of the Ramesseum Papyri in the Newberry Papers, The Griffith Institute Oxford", BMSAES, 23, archived from the original on 1 August 2019
- Parkinson, R B (2019), "Imaginary Histories: Ancient Egypt in the Writings of Marguerite Yourcenar and Philippe Derchain", Studien zur Altägyptischen Kultur, 48: 207–40
- Parkinson, R B (2019), 'The First Gay Kiss?': An Ancient Egyptian Monument in C. Brickell (ed.), Queer Objects, Otago University Press, pp. 2–7
- Parkinson, R B (with C. D. Hollings) (2020), "Two letters from Otto Neugebauer to Thomas Eric Peet on Ancient Egyptian Mathematics", Historia Mathematica, 28 (2): 183–286, doi:10.1016/j.hm.2020.05.001, S2CID 219925708
- Parkinson, R B (2022), ""Old Things Belonging to the Nation": Forster, Antiquities and the Queer Museum", Polish Journal of English Studies, 7 (1): 54–71
- Parkinson, R B (with C. D. Hollings) (2022), "Contrasting aims and approaches in the study of ancient Egyptian mathematics in the 1920s" (PDF), Revue d'histoire des mathématiques, 28 (2): 66–98

== See also ==
- List of Egyptologists
- The Eloquent Peasant
- Ancient Egyptian literature
