= Statutory Professor in the Analysis of Partial Differential Equations =

The Statutory Professorship in the Analysis of Partial Differential Equations is a chair at the Mathematical Institute of the University of Oxford, England. Since its inception in 2009, the chair has been held by Professor Gui-Qiang Chen. It is associated with Keble College, Oxford.

== Holders of the chair ==
- 2009– Prof. Gui-Qiang George Chen

== See also ==
- List of professorships at the University of Oxford
