= Gui-Qiang Chen =

Mathematician (born 1963)

Gui-Qiang G. Chen
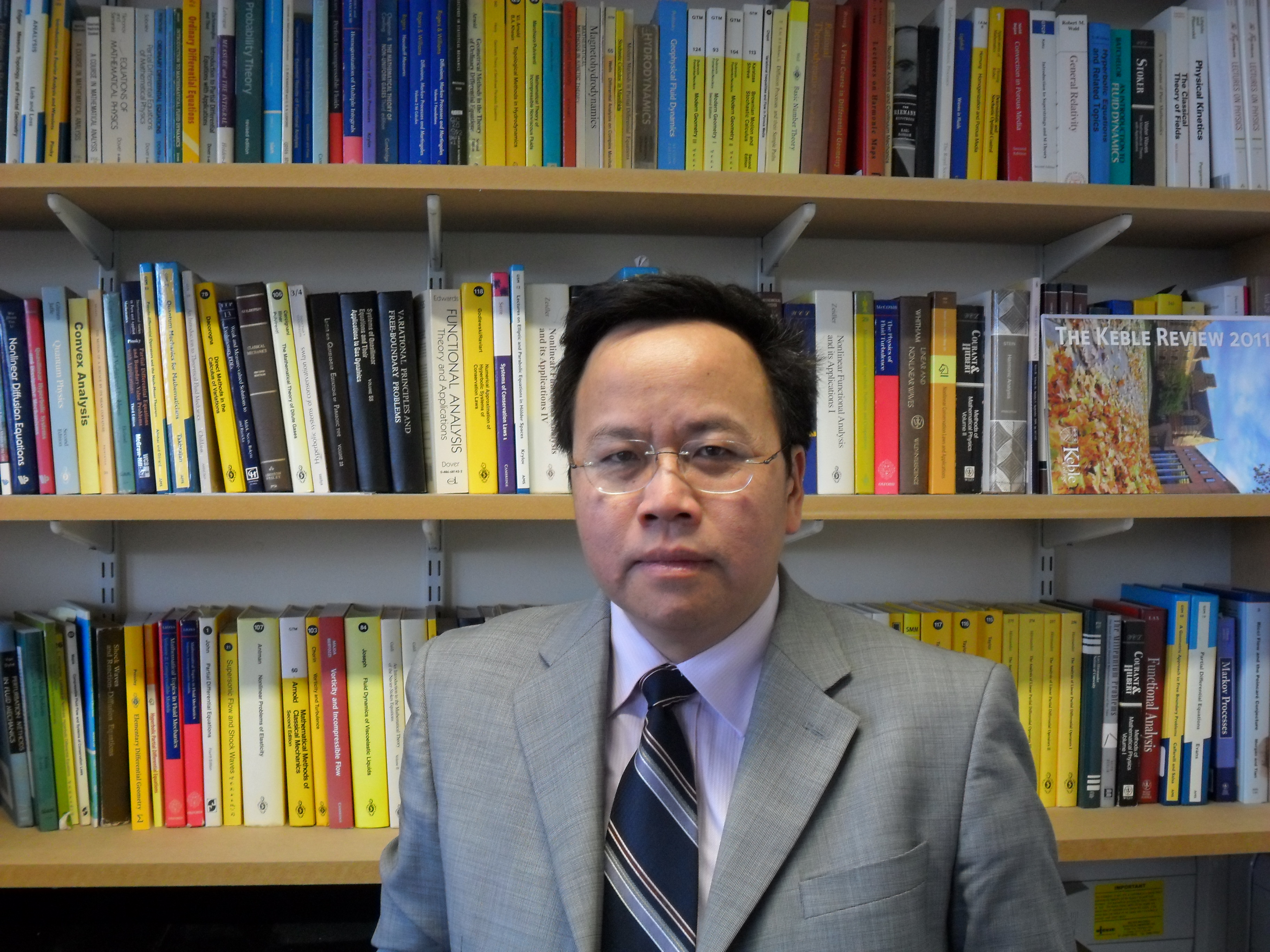
- Gui-Qiang George Chen
- Born: 25 May 1963 (age 63); Cixi City, Ningbo, Zhejiang, China
- Education: Fudan University; Chinese Academy of Sciences
- Awards: LMS Pólya Prize (2024) Member of Academia Europaea (2022); Member of the European Academy of Sciences (2020); Fellow of the American Mathematical Society (2017); Fellow of the Society of Industrial and Applied Mathematics (2012); SIAG/ APDE Prize (2011); Royal Society Wolfson Research Merit Award (2009); Alexander von Humboldt Fellow (2003); Alfred P. Sloan Fellow (1991) Chinese National Natural Science Prize (1989)
- Scientific career
- Fields: Partial Differential Equations, Nonlinear Analysis, Mathematical Physics
- Workplaces: University of Oxford; Northwestern University; University of Chicago; New York University; Chinese Academy of Sciences

Gui-Qiang George Chen (Chinese: 陈贵强; pinyin: Chen Gui Qiang; born 25 May 1963) is a Chinese-born American-British mathematician. Currently, he is Statutory Professor in the Analysis of Partial Differential Equations, Director of the Oxford Centre for Nonlinear Partial Differential Equations at the Mathematical Institute, and Professorial Fellow at Keble College, located at the University of Oxford, as well as Life Member of Clare Hall, University of Cambridge.

== Biography ==
Born in 1963 in Cixi City, Ningbo, Zhejiang, he obtained his BSc in 1982 at Fudan University (Shanghai) and received his PhD in 1987 at the Chinese Academy of Sciences (Beijing), then moved to the Courant Institute of Mathematical Sciences, New York University, as a Postdoctoral Research Fellow (1987–89). He also received Doctor of Science (DSc) (Higher Doctorate) in 2024 and M.A. (by resolution) in 2011 from the University of Oxford and became a British citizen by naturalisation in 2016.

== Research ==
His main research areas lie in nonlinear partial differential equations, nonlinear analysis, and their applications to mechanics, geometry, and other areas of mathematics and science. His recent research interests include nonlinear conservation laws, nonlinear waves, nonlinear equations of mixed type, free boundary problems, geometric problems, and stochastic partial differential equations. His research interests also include measure-theoretical analysis, weak convergence methods, statistical physics, and numerical analysis. He has published more than 200 original research papers and more than 10 research books. Since 2000, he has delivered more than 300 invited lectures around the world.

Professor Gui-Qiang G. Chen is awarded the Pólya Prize for his deep research into nonlinear partial differential equations, and in particular his rigorous theoretical analysis of the equations of gas dynamics, especially those involving transonic flows. A description of some contributions made by Gui-Qiang George Chen to nonlinear conservation laws and partial differential equations can be found in the article 'Some Contributions of Gui-Qiang G. Chen to Nonlinear Conservation Laws and Partial Differential Equations'.

== Academic career ==
Professor Gui-Qiang G. Chen is currently Statutory Professor in the Analysis of Partial Differential Equations at the Mathematical Institute and Professorial Fellow of Keble College, University of Oxford. He served as Director of the EPSRC Centre for Doctoral Training in Partial Differential Equations, University of Oxford, from 2014 to 2023. Before these, he was Full Professor of Mathematics at Northwestern University 1996–2009 and Associate Professor of Mathematics there 1994–96, and Assistant Professor and Adjunct Professor of Mathematics at the University of Chicago 1989–99. He was a member of the Institute for Advanced Study (Princeton, US), Mathematical Sciences Research Institute (Berkeley, US), Isaac Newton Institute for Mathematical Sciences (Cambridge, UK), Mittag-Leffler Institute of Mathematics (Djursholm, Sweden), and Mathematics Center Heidelberg (Heidelberg, Germany), as well as Senior Fellow of the Institute for Pure and Applied Mathematics (Los Angeles, US) and the Centre for Advanced Study of the Norwegian Academy of Science and Letters (Oslo, Norway). He is also an Adjunct Professor of the Chinese Academy of Sciences and Northwestern University (US), a Distinguished Advisory Professor of Shanghai Jiaotong University, and a Changjiang Distinguished Professor of Fudan University and the Ministry of Education of China.

== Activities ==
Professor Gui-Qiang G. Chen now serves on the Edmond and Nancy Tomastik Prize in Differential Equations Selection Committee of the American Mathematical Society (2025–28), SIAM News Liaison (SIAG/APDE), Society for Industrial and Applied Mathematics (2019-–Present), and the Scientific Board of the National Key Laboratory of Mathematical Science of the Chinese Academy of Sciences (2025—Present). He served on the organising committee of the SIAM PDE Webinars for the Society for Industrial and Applied Mathematics (2019–23) and the international scientific board, RUDN University, Moscow, Russia (2018–25). He was a member of the Major Awards Committee of the Society for Industrial and Applied Mathematics (2017–19), a member of the Royal Society Newton International Fellowship Board (2013–18), co-chair of the Theme Programme on Free Boundary Problems and Related Topics, Isaac Newton Institute for Mathematical Sciences (2014); chair (2009–10) and program director (2005–06) of Activity Group on Analysis of Partial Differential Equations, Society of Industrial and Applied Mathematics, US; chair of the Organizing Committee, SIAM Conference on Analysis of Partial Differential Equations (2006); a Member of the AMS-MAA Program Committee for the Joint Annual National Meetings (2008), American Mathematical Society Scientific Committee for the Joint International Meeting with Shanghai Mathematical Society (2008), AMS Program Committee for the Annual Meeting (2009), and Committee for National Meetings of American Mathematical Society (2007–10); panellist of National Science Foundation (USA), Austrian Science Fund, and Research Council of Norway. He has been a chair, or an organiser/co-organiser, or a member of the scientific committees, of more than 200 international conferences, workshops, symposia, summer schools, and emphasis years in more than 15 countries. He has been editor-in-chief and a member of the editorial boards for more than 10 leading international scientific journals.

== Awards, honours and fellowships ==
- The 2024 Pólya Prize, London Mathematical Society, London (UK), June 2024.
- Doctor of Science (DSc) (Higher Doctorate), University of Oxford, July 2024.
- Member of Academia Europaea (Academy of Europe) (MAE), UK, 2022.
- Fellow of the European Academy of Sciences (FEurASC), Belgium, 2020.
- Fellow of the American Mathematical Society (FAMS), US, 2017.
- Fellow of the Institute of Mathematics and its Applications (FIMA), UK, January 2014.
- Life member, Clare Hall, University of Cambridge, UK, July 2014.
- Turner-Kirk Fellow, Isaac Newton Institute for Mathematical Sciences, Cambridge, UK, 2013–14.
- Fellow of the Society of Industrial and Applied Mathematics
- The 2011 SIAM SIAG/ APDE Prize (SIAM, 2011)
- Royal Society Wolfson Research Merit Award (2009)
- Alexander von Humboldt Fellow (2003)
- Alfred P. Sloan Fellowship (1991)
- Chinese National Natural Science Prize (1989)
- University of Chicago-Argonne Fellowship in Mathematics (1989–90)
- Chinese Academy of Sciences Award in Mathematics (First Prize, 1988)
- Best Paper Award by Beijing Mathematical Society (1988)
