= Vairumati tei Oa =

Painting by Paul Gauguin

Vairaumati tei oa
- Her Name is Vairaumati
- Artist: Paul Gauguin
- Year: 1892
- Medium: oil on canvas
- Dimensions: 91 cm × 68 cm (36 in × 27 in)
- Location: Pushkin Museum of Fine Arts, Moscow

Vairumati tei Oa (English: Her Name is Vairaumati) is an 1892 painting by Paul Gauguin, produced during his time in Tahiti. It remained in the artist's family before passing to Ambroise Vollard's gallery in Paris. Sergei Shchukin acquired it from the latter in 1904 and in 1918 it was acquired by the 1st Museum of New Western Painting. Since 1948 it has been in the Pushkin Museum in Moscow.

== Description ==
The painting depicts the legend of the Tahitian god ʻOro descending to Earth and taking the beautiful woman Vairaumati as his wife. Gauguin depicts the story of 'Oro and Vairaumati twice: the ancient stone statues in the background and the modern Tahitian couple in the foreground. Vairaumati takes the form of a contemporary Tahitian woman smoking a cigarette. Her pose is based on depictions from the Ancient Egyptian Tomb of Nebamun, of which Gauguin had brought photographs to Tahiti.

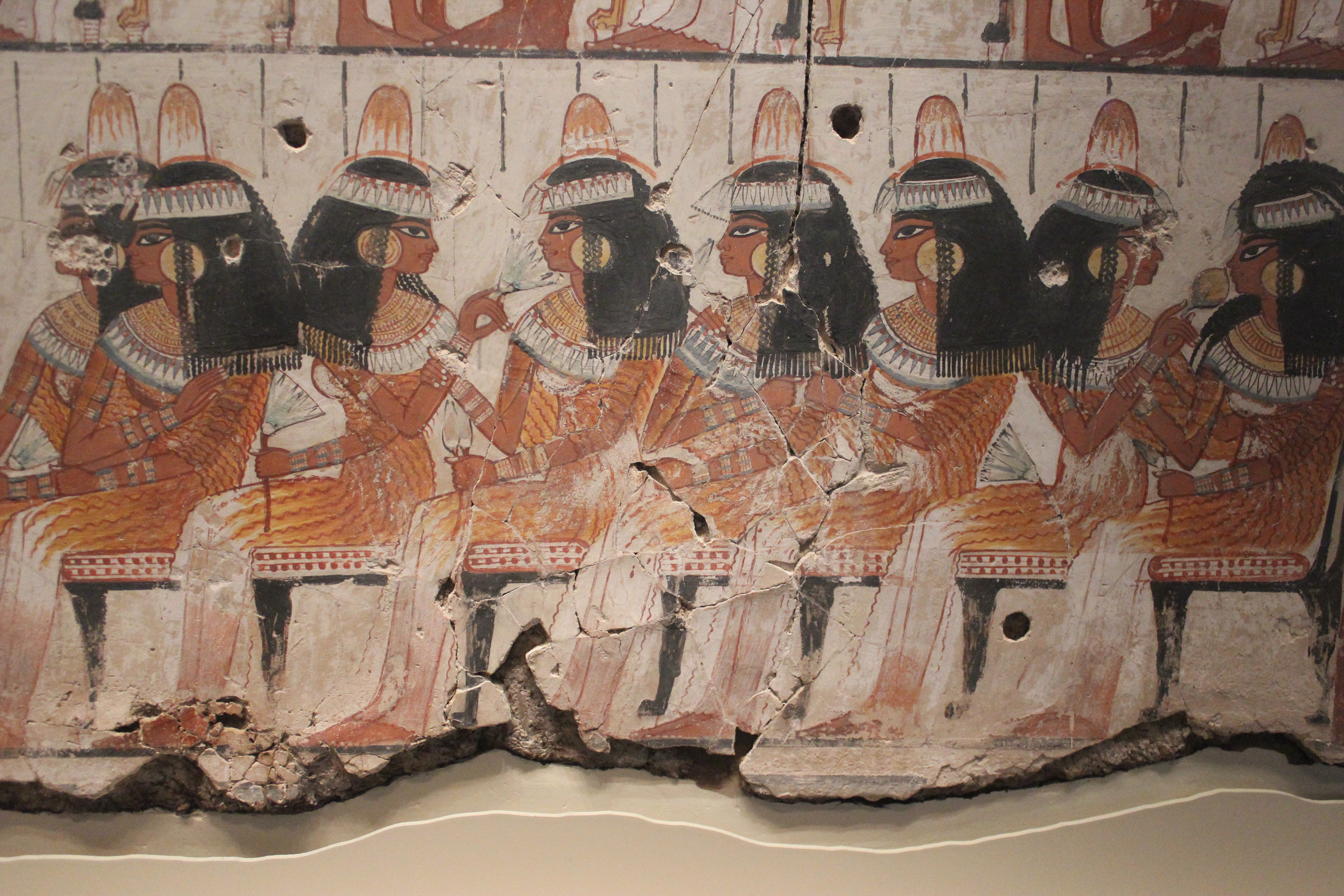
Banquet Scene - Tomb of Nebamun

== See also ==
- List of paintings by Paul Gauguin
