= Reza Sheikholeslami =

Ali Reza Sheikholeslami (21 July 1941 – 9 January 2018) was Masoumeh and Fereydoon Soudavar Professor of Persian Studies at Wadham College in the University of Oxford from 1990 to 2006.

He was born in Tehran and attended Bell School in Cambridge, England (1960–62). He received a BA from Columbia University (1967), an MA from Northwestern University (1968), an MA from the University of Oxford and a PhD in Islamic studies from the University of California, Los Angeles (1975). His dissertation title was "The Structure of Central Authority in Qajar Iran 1871–1896".

He was an assistant professor of political science at the University of Washington (1975–85), senior research fellow at Harvard University (1987–88) and a visiting senior fellow at St Antony's College, Oxford (1988–90). He was appointed the inaugural Soudavar Professor at Oxford in 1990, and held the Chair until 2006. He was a visiting scholar at the American University of Sharjah, United Arab Emirates (2006–8).

His publications include The Political Economy of Saudi Arabia (1984) and The Structure of Central Authority in Qajar Iran 1871–1896 (1997).

He was married to Shahrzad Vigeh Sheikholeslami.
