= Soudavar Professor of Persian Studies =

Professorship at the University of Oxford, England

The Masoumeh and Fereydoon Soudavar Professorship of Persian Studies is a Chair at the University of Oxford, England, associated with the Faculty of Oriental Studies and Wadham College. The Chair was inaugurated in 1990.

== List of Soudavar Professors of Persian Studies ==
The holders of the Chair have been:

- Reza Sheikholeslami, 1990–2006
- Edmund Herzig, 2006–
