= Bobbie Hagelin =

Swedish ice hockey player

- Born: 1 February 1984 (age 42) Södertälje, Sweden
- Height: 5 ft 11 in (180 cm)
- Weight: 185 lb (84 kg; 13 st 3 lb)
- Played for: Södertälje SK; Rødovre Mighty Bulls
- Playing career: 2001–2009

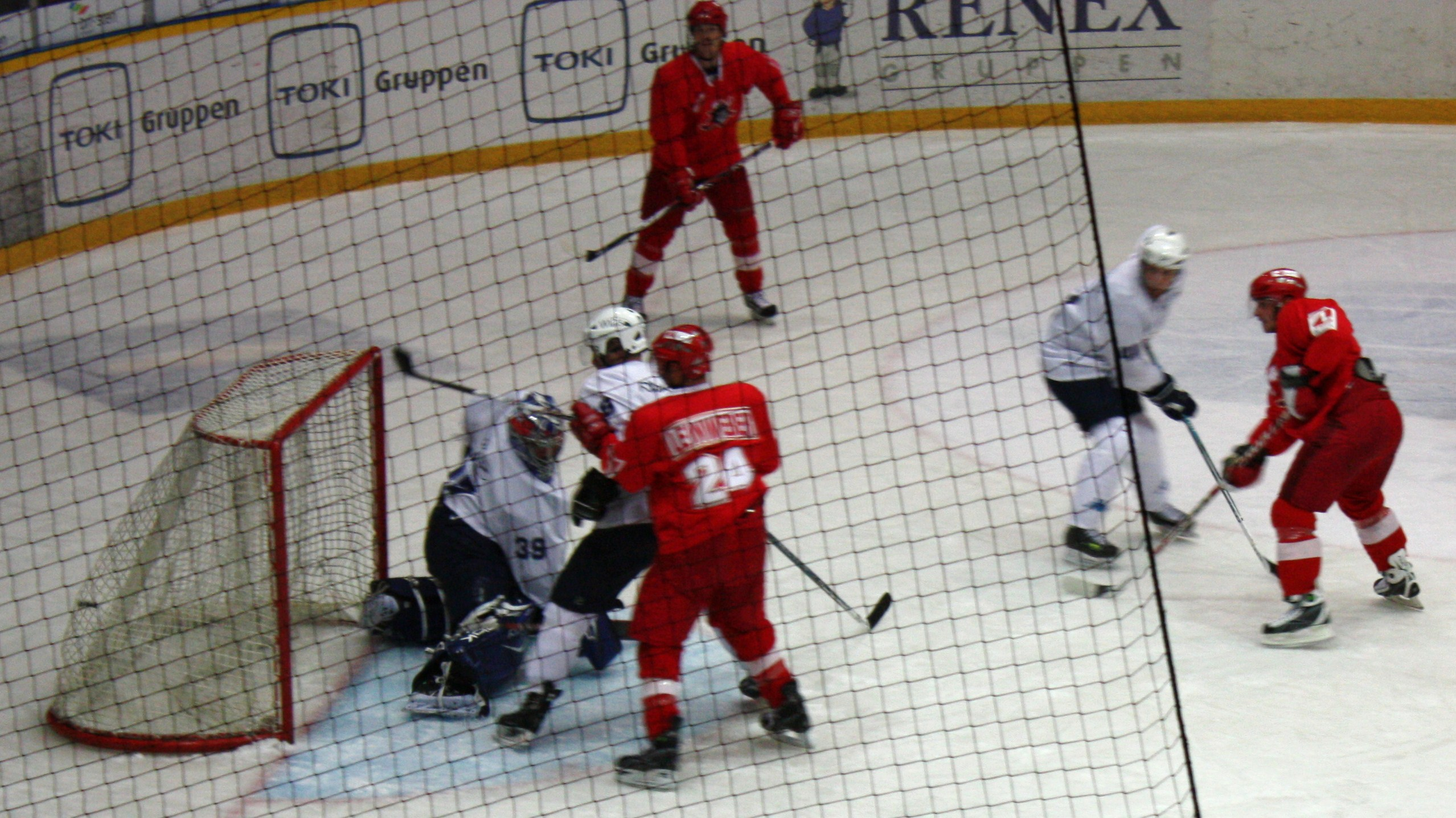
Bobbie Hagelin scores for Rødovre Mighty Bulls in a Danish Cup game vs Nordsjælland Cobras (2008)

Bobbie Hagelin (born 1 February 1984) is a Swedish former professional ice hockey player. He played for Södertälje SK in the Swedish Elite League and for Rødovre Mighty Bulls in the Danish AL-Bank Ligaen.

He is the elder brother of ex-Michigan Wolverines ice hockey player and current Washington Capitals forward Carl Hagelin. In three seasons with Södertälje SK from 2001 to 2004 he played 45 games, scoring two goals and one assist. In two seasons with Rødovre Mighty Bulls from 2007 to 2009 he played 73 games, scoring 27 goals and 27 assists.
