= Jaroslav Černý (Egyptologist) =

Czech Egyptologist (1898–1970)

Jaroslav Černý FBA
- Born: August 22, 1898; Plzeň, Kingdom of Bohemia, Austria-Hungary
- Died: May 29, 1970 (aged 71); Oxford, England
- Education: Charles University
- Known for: Research on the Deir el-Medina workmen's community, hieratic ostraca, and New Kingdom administrative texts
- Title: Edwards Professor of Egyptology (1946–1951); Professor of Egyptology at Oxford (1951–1965)
- Scientific career
- Fields: Egyptology
- Institutions: Charles University (1929–1946); University College London (1946–1951); University of Oxford (1951–1965)

Jaroslav Černý, FBA (Czech pronunciation: [ˈjaroslaf ˈtʃɛrniː]; 22 August 1898 – 29 May 1970) was a Czech Egyptologist. From 1929 to 1946 he was a lecturer and docent at Charles University in Prague, from 1946 to 1951, the Edwards Professor of Egyptology at the University College, London. From 1951 to 1965, he was Professor of Egyptology at University of Oxford.

== Early life ==
Jaroslav Černý was born on 22 August 1898 in Plzeň in Austria-Hungary (currently the Czech Republic). His family lived in Plzeň until 1913, then moved to Slaný. Černý continued his studies at a gymnasium in Plzeň until 1917.

He studied from 1917 till 1922 at Charles University, where he received his doctorate in 1922, and his post-doctoral Habilitation in 1929.

== Career ==
He took part in Bernard Bruyère's excavations at Deir el-Medina from 1925 to 1970 and the village became the focus of a lifelong study. One volume, of a planned three on the village, was published before his death with other parts published posthumously. He was sponsored by Tomáš Garrigue Masaryk from 1927, and worked with Alan Henderson Gardiner from 1934. In the 1930s, Černý participated in epigraphic missions across Egypt—at Sinai and Abydos.

He spent the Second World War in Cairo and London, from 1942 as an employee of the Czechoslovak Ministry of Foreign Affairs. In 1946, he became professor for Egyptology at University College London. From 1951 until 1965 he was Professor of Egyptology at Oxford University. His specialties were hieratic script, the New Kingdom, and Late Egyptian literature.

== Death ==
He died on 29 May 1970 in Oxford, England, where he is buried in Wolvercote Cemetery.

== Works ==
- Catalogue des ostraca hiératiques non littéraires de Deir el-Medineh (7 volumes), Le Caire 1937–70.
- Ostraca hiératiques, Le Caire 1931-1935 (Catalogue Général du Musée égyptien du Caire, 25501–25832).
- Late Ramesside Letters, Brussels 1939.
- Répertoire onomastique de Deir el-Médineh, Le Caire 1949 [in collaboration with B. Bruyère and J. J. Clère].
- The Inscriptions of Sinai, London 1952, 1955 [in collaboration with Alan H. Gardiner and T. Eric Peet].
- Paper & Books in Ancient Egypt, London.
- Ancient Egyptian Religion, London 1952 (1952, 1957).
- Hieratic Ostraca, Volume I. Oxford 1957.
- Egyptian Stelae in the Bankes Collection, Oxford 1958.
- Hieratic Inscriptions from the Tomb of Tutankhamun, Oxford 1965.
- A Community of Workmen at Thebes in the Ramesside Period, Cairo 1973.
- A Late Egyptian Grammar, Rome 1975 (1978, 1984) [in collaboration with Sarah Israelit Groll, supported by Christopher Eyre].
- Coptic Etymological Dictionary, Cambridge 1976.
- Papyrus hiératiques de Deir el-Médineh, Tome I. Le Caire 1978 [finished by Georges Posener].
