= Nebamun =

Ancient Egyptian scribe

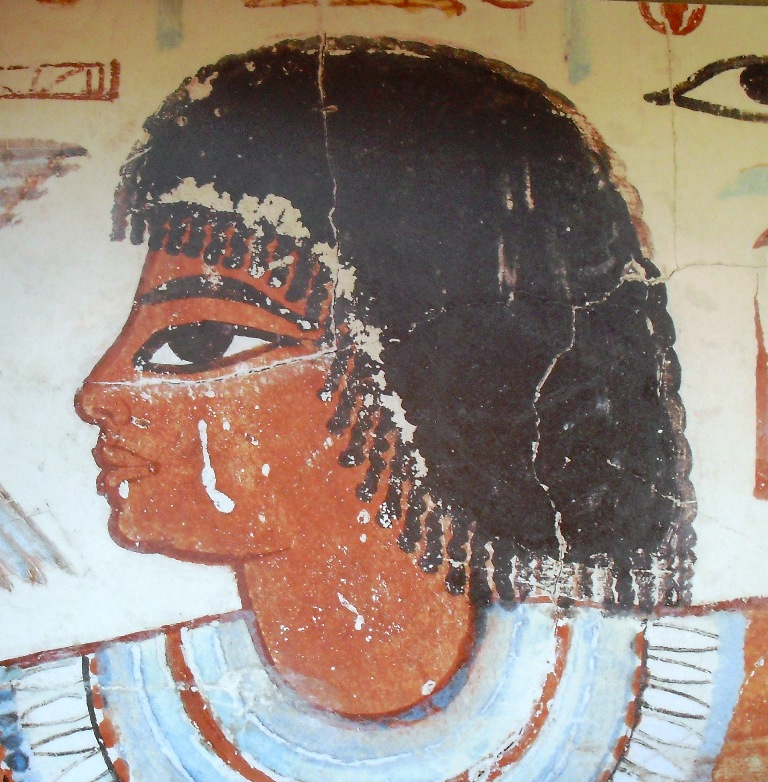
- Detail of the head of Nebamun, from the scene Hunting in the Marshes in the tomb of Nebamun, exposed in the British Museum
- Occupations: Scribe and grain accountant
- Years active: c. 1350 BC
- Spouse: Hatshepsut

Nebamun (fl. c. 1350 BC) was a middle-ranking official "scribe and grain accountant" during the period of the New Kingdom in ancient Egypt. He worked at the vast temple complex near Thebes (now Luxor) where the state-god Amun was worshipped. His name was translated as "My Lord is Amun", and his association with the temple, coupled with the importance of grain supplies to Egypt, meant that he was a person of considerable practical importance, though not of the highest rank.

Nebamun is known today because of the 1820 discovery of the richly decorated Tomb of Nebamun on the west bank of the Nile River near Thebes. Although the exact location of that tomb is now lost, a number of wall paintings from the tomb were acquired by the British Museum where they are now on display. They are considered to be one of that museum's greatest treasures.

== Gallery ==
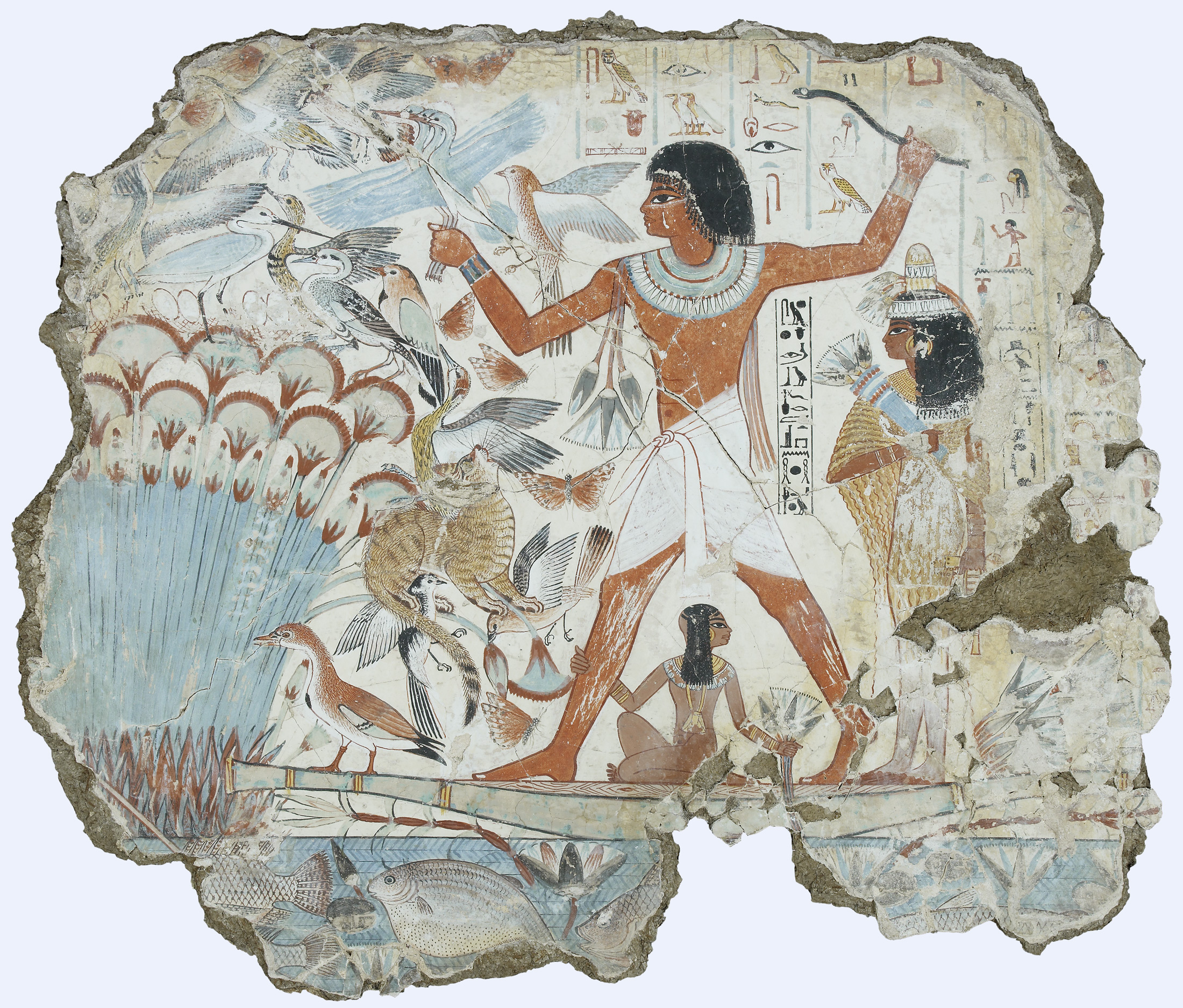
Fowling scene

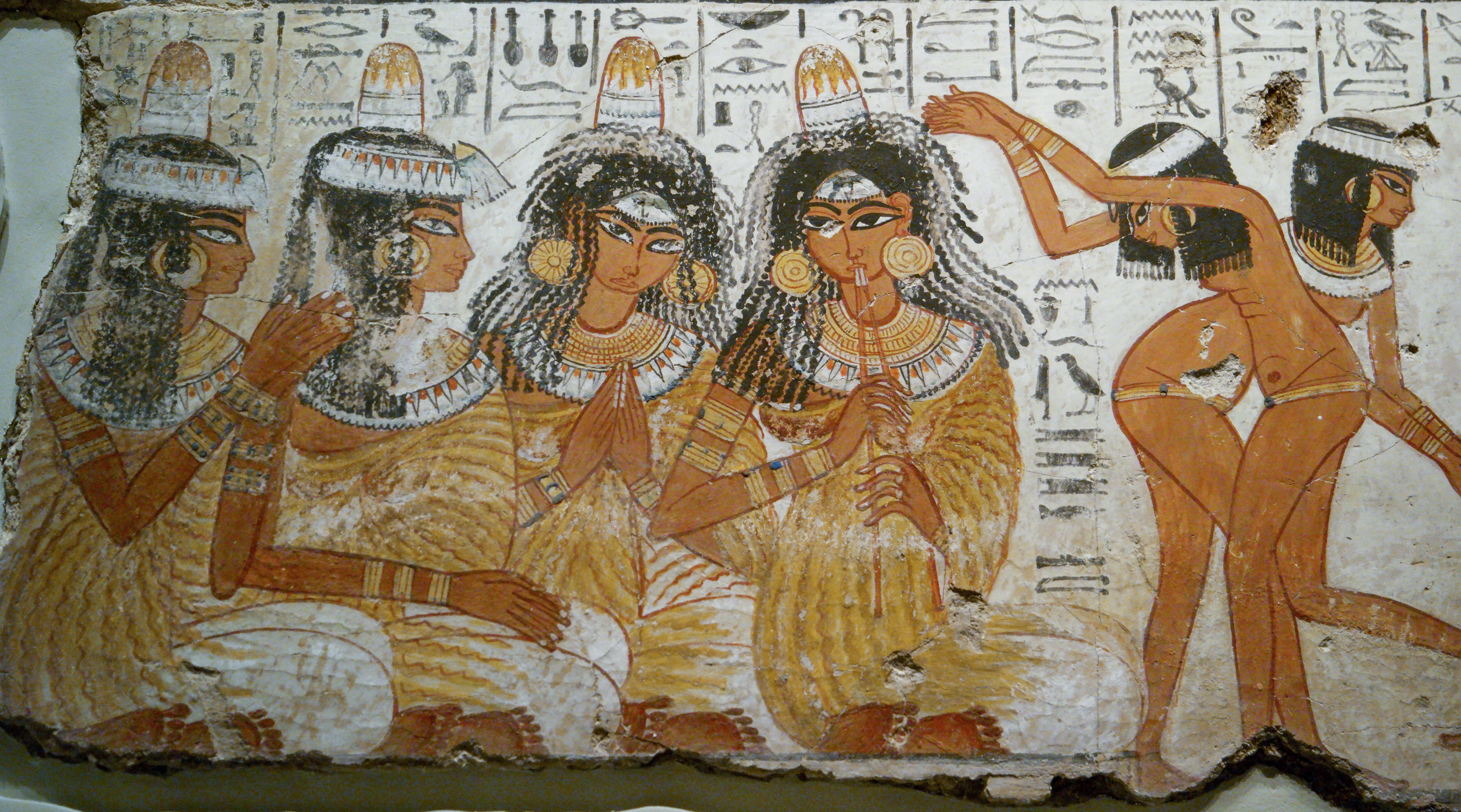
Dancers and musicians

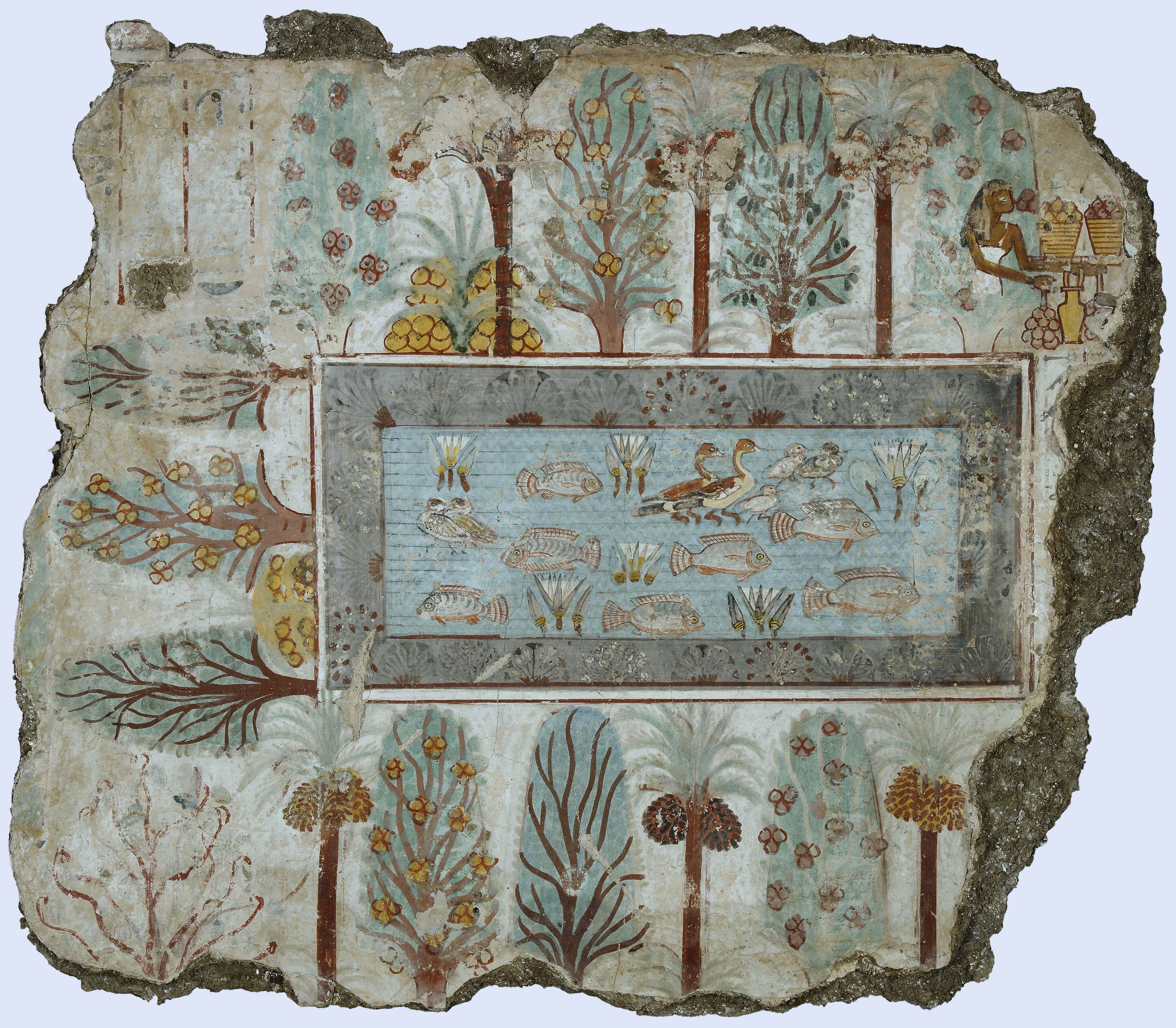
Pond in a Garden from the Tomb of Nebamun, Thebes

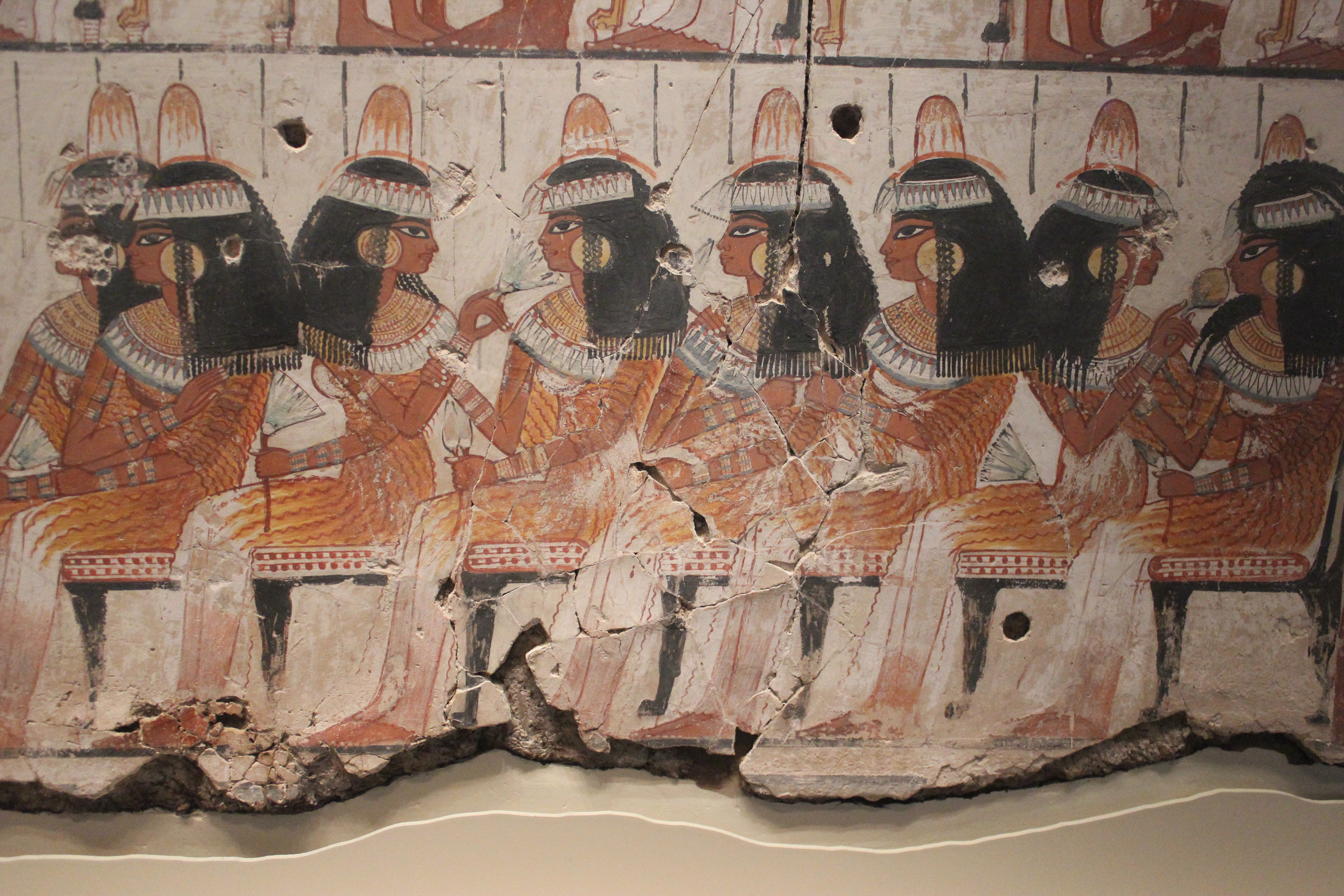
Tomb of Nebamun, Banquet

== See also ==
- List of ancient Egyptian scribes
