= Carl Hagelin =

Swedish ice hockey player (born 1988)

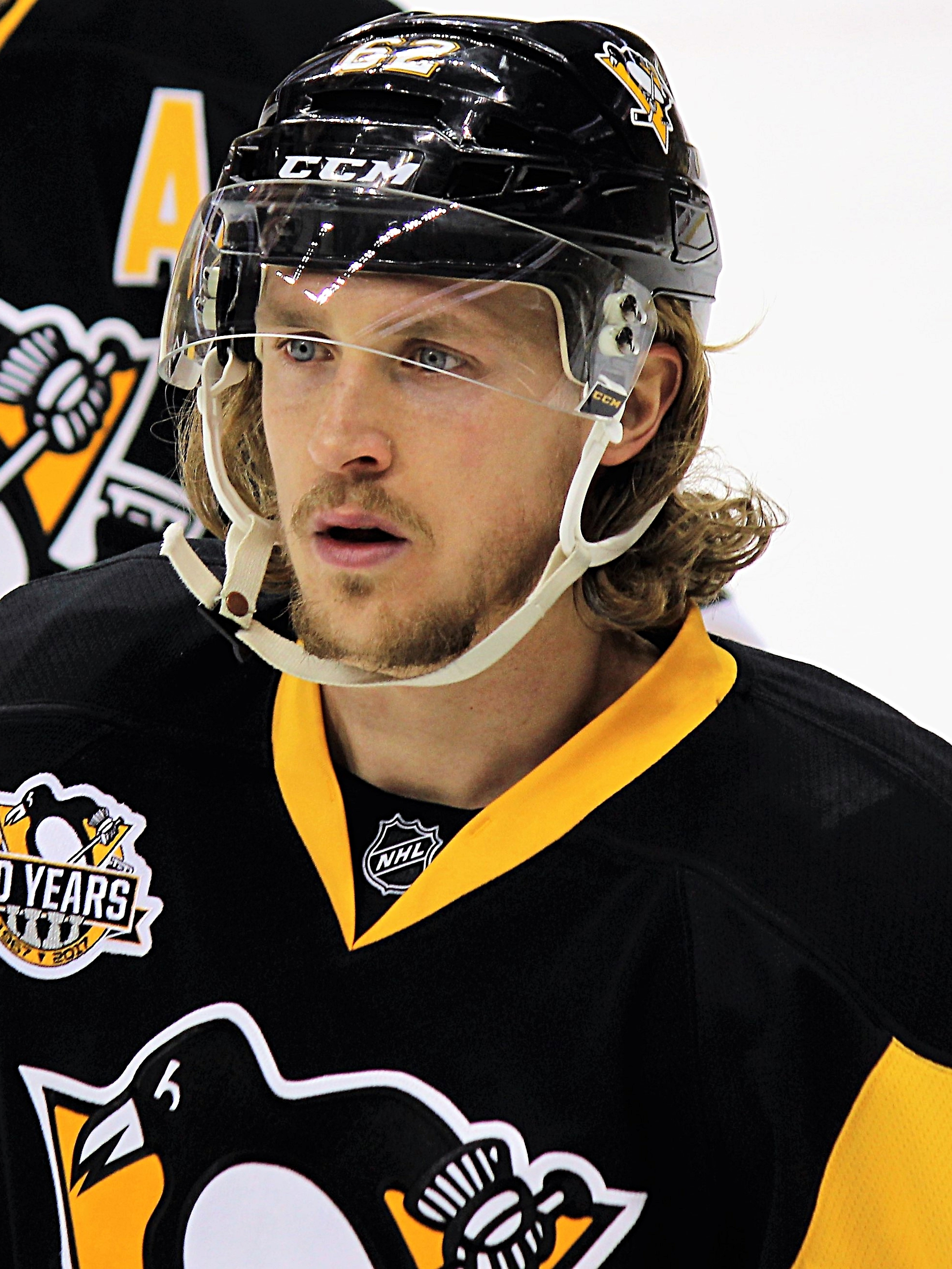
- Hagelin with the Pittsburgh Penguins during the 2017 Stanley Cup playoffs
- Born: 23 August 1988 (age 37) Nykvarn, Sweden
- Height: 5 ft 11 in (180 cm)
- Weight: 186 lb (84 kg; 13 st 4 lb)
- Position: Left wing
- Shot: Left
- Played for: New York Rangers; Anaheim Ducks; Pittsburgh Penguins; Los Angeles Kings; Washington Capitals
- National team: Sweden
- NHL draft: 168th overall, 2007; New York Rangers
- Playing career: 2011–2022

Carl Oliver Hagelin (born 23 August 1988) is a Swedish former professional ice hockey player who played eleven seasons in the National Hockey League (NHL) for the New York Rangers, Anaheim Ducks, Pittsburgh Penguins, Los Angeles Kings, and Washington Capitals. Hagelin was drafted by the Rangers in the sixth round, 168th overall, of the 2007 NHL entry draft, and won the Stanley Cup as a member of the Penguins in 2016 and 2017. Hagelin played the most playoff games of any NHL player in the 2010s decade, with 128. Prior to his professional career, Hagelin played four seasons NCAA Division I collegiate men's ice hockey with the University of Michigan Wolverines, serving as an alternate captain during his third year and a co-captain during his fourth year. Internationally, Hagelin won a silver medal with Sweden at the 2014 Winter Olympics.

== Amateur playing career ==
=== Södertälje SK ===
Prior to beginning his collegiate career, Hagelin played two seasons for Södertälje SK's team in the J20 SuperElit. During that time, he scored 44 goals and 51 assists, ranking fifth all-time in points and goals scored for Södertälje, as well as fourth in goals per season.

=== University of Michigan ===
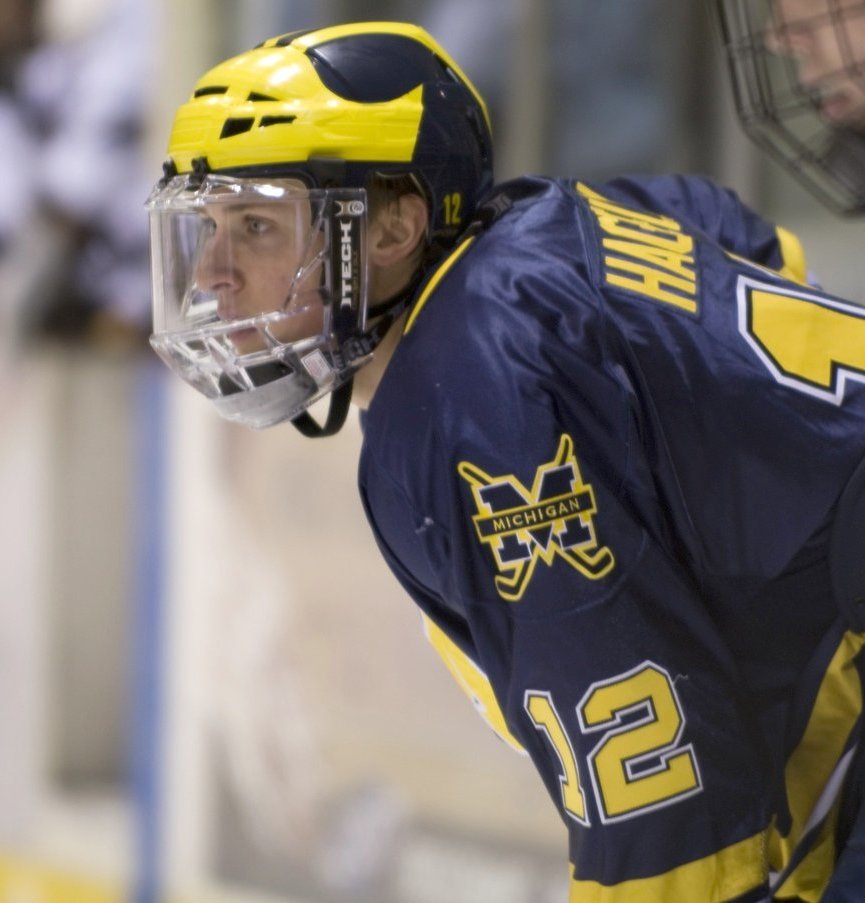
Hagelin during his sophomore season at the University of Michigan

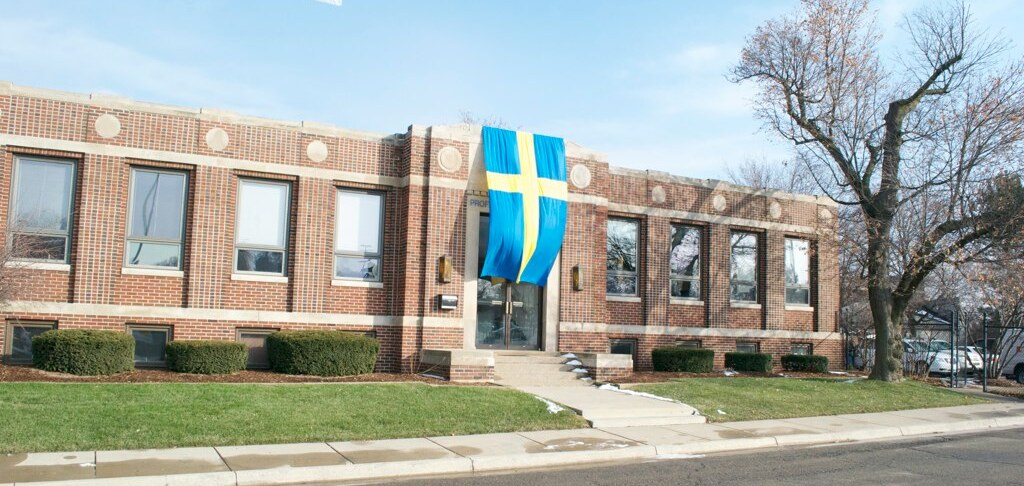
The University of Michigan displaying its appreciation of Hagelin by hanging a Swedish flag on a campus building the day of The Big Chill at the Big House game. Hagelin was considered a "fan favorite" among Michigan supporters, who regularly displayed the Swedish flag in celebration of him.

After moving to North America, Hagelin played college hockey for the University of Michigan Wolverines ice hockey team of the Central Collegiate Hockey Association (CCHA). In doing so, he became the first Swedish ice hockey player to ever play for the university, and the first European-born player in fifteen years to be on Michigan's roster. As a junior in 2009–10, Hagelin helped Michigan win the CCHA championship and was named as an Academic All-Big Ten. As a senior in 2010–11, Hagelin won the CCHA Best Defensive Forward Award and was named to the All-CCHA First Team. He also won the CCHA Best Defensive Forward Award and was a finalist for the CCHA Player of the Year Award for the 2010–11 season, in addition to the Inside College Hockey 2010–11 All-America Third Team and the AHCA/Old Time Hockey All-American Ice Hockey Team (second team, west).

Hagelin was then selected in the sixth round, 168th overall, by the New York Rangers at the 2007 NHL entry draft. Before playing at Michigan, Hagelin wore the number 26, but when that number was already taken by fellow forward Danny Fardig, Hagelin changed to 12. Hagelin later then chose to wear the number 62 with the Rangers because both 12 and 26 were already taken, so he switched the digits of his old 26, thus wearing 62. Hagelin played in the 2008 World Junior Ice Hockey Championships with Sweden, winning silver,

Hagelin was an alternate captain during Michigan's 2009–10 season, and was a co-captain during its 2010–11 season (along with Luke Glendening). Hagelin was regarded to be a "fan favorite" player among Michigan hockey fans. By his final season on the team, fans had taken to regularly displaying Swedish flags as an expression of their high regard for him.

== Professional playing career ==
=== New York Rangers ===
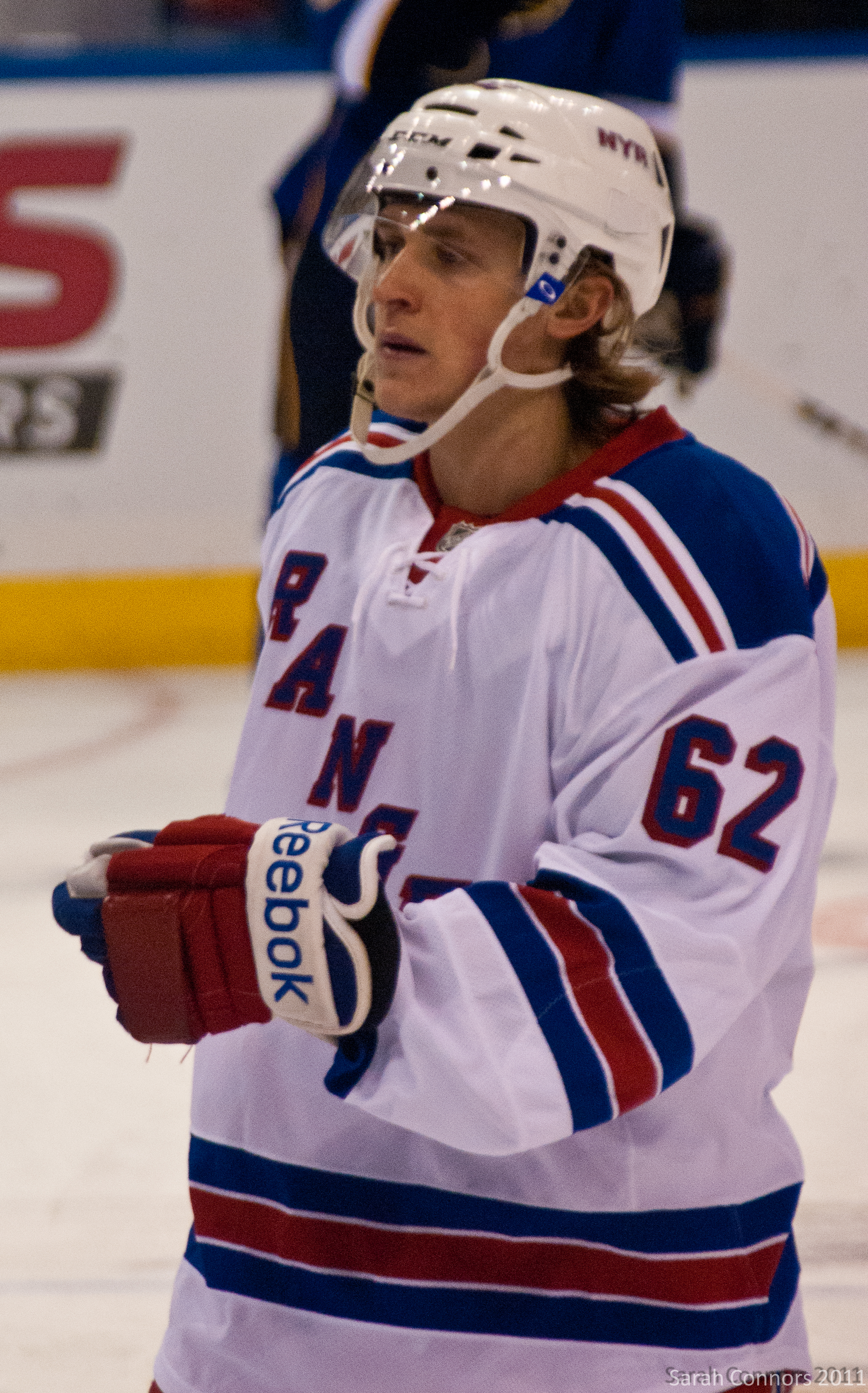
Hagelin with the Rangers in 2011

After Michigan lost the 2011 NCAA final game, the Rangers signed Hagelin to a professional contract, whereby he joined the Rangers' then-American Hockey League (AHL) affiliate, the Connecticut Whale, for the 2011 Calder Cup playoffs. He then began the subsequent 2011–12 season playing for the Whale.

Hagelin made his NHL debut against the Washington Capitals on 25 November 2011, registering an assist on a goal by Brian Boyle for his first NHL point. Hagelin then scored his first career NHL goal the next day against goaltender Sergei Bobrovsky of the Philadelphia Flyers.

After Adam Henrique of the New Jersey Devils pulled out of the 2012 NHL All-Star Rookie Showcase due to injury, Hagelin took his spot and was slated to take part in the Fastest Skater challenge during the Skills Competition, ultimately winning the competition after beating Ottawa Senators rookie Colin Greening with the fastest final round time ever recorded, 13.218, later beaten by Jonathan Drouin in 2015. Nevertheless, Hagelin later admitted Rangers teammate Marián Gáborík may be an even faster skater.

On 15 April 2012, Hagelin received a three-game suspension for elbowing Ottawa Senators captain Daniel Alfredsson in the head during New York's loss in game two of the Eastern Conference Quarterfinals.

In the 2014–15 season, Hagelin matched his career-high of 17 goals and added 35 points in 82 games for the Presidents' Trophy-winning Rangers. On 24 April 2015, Hagelin scored the series-clinching goal in overtime of game five of the 2015 Eastern Conference Quarterfinals against the Pittsburgh Penguins.

=== Anaheim Ducks ===
On 27 June 2015, Hagelin, slated to become a restricted free agent on 1 July, was traded along with two draft picks to the Anaheim Ducks in exchange for Emerson Etem and a second-round selection in the 2015 NHL entry draft, which New York used to pick Ryan Gropp. He was later signed to a four-year contract with the Ducks on 14 August 2015.

=== Pittsburgh Penguins ===
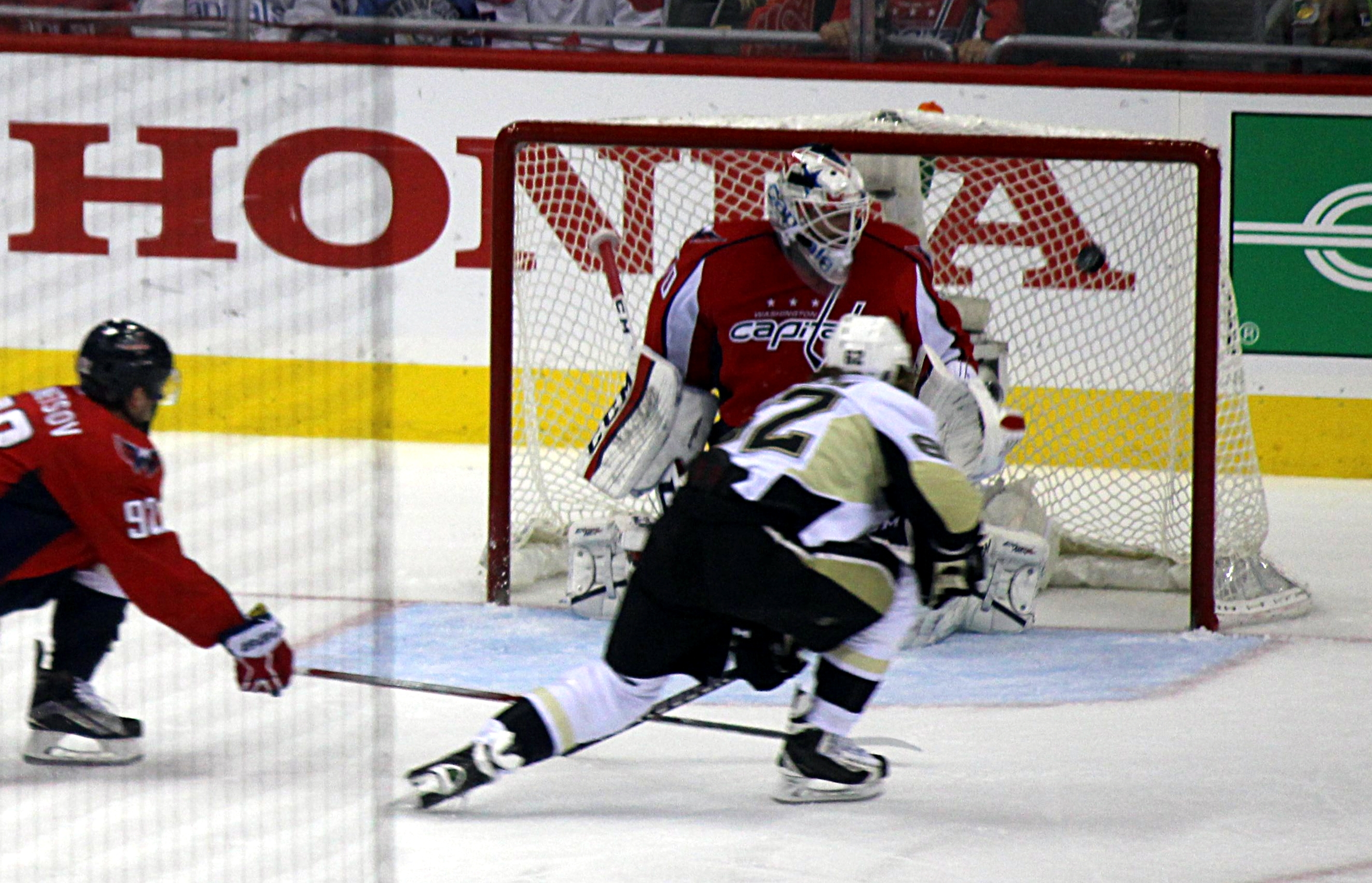
Hagelin scores on Braden Holtby of the Capitals during the 2016 Stanley Cup playoffs.

In the 2015–16 season, Hagelin struggled with his new club, failing to reproduce his scoring presence from his tenure with the Rangers. With 12 points in 43 games, Hagelin was traded by the Ducks to the Pittsburgh Penguins in exchange for forward David Perron and defenseman Adam Clendening on 16 January 2016. Hagelin then went on to produce 27 points in 37 games, helping spark the Penguins' mid-season turnaround with his speed. He was also a key contributor in the playoffs, scoring 16 points en route to a 2016 Stanley Cup championship. Hagelin again won the Cup in 2017, defeating the Nashville Predators in six games. Although that season was marred by injury and low point production, Hagelin did score the final goal of the playoffs, an empty netter in game six, which sealed the 2–0 victory.

=== Los Angeles Kings ===
On 14 November 2018, the Penguins traded Hagelin to the Los Angeles Kings in exchange for Tanner Pearson. Hagelin's time with the Kings was brief and marred by injury, limiting him to just 22 games with the team.

=== Washington Capitals and retirement ===
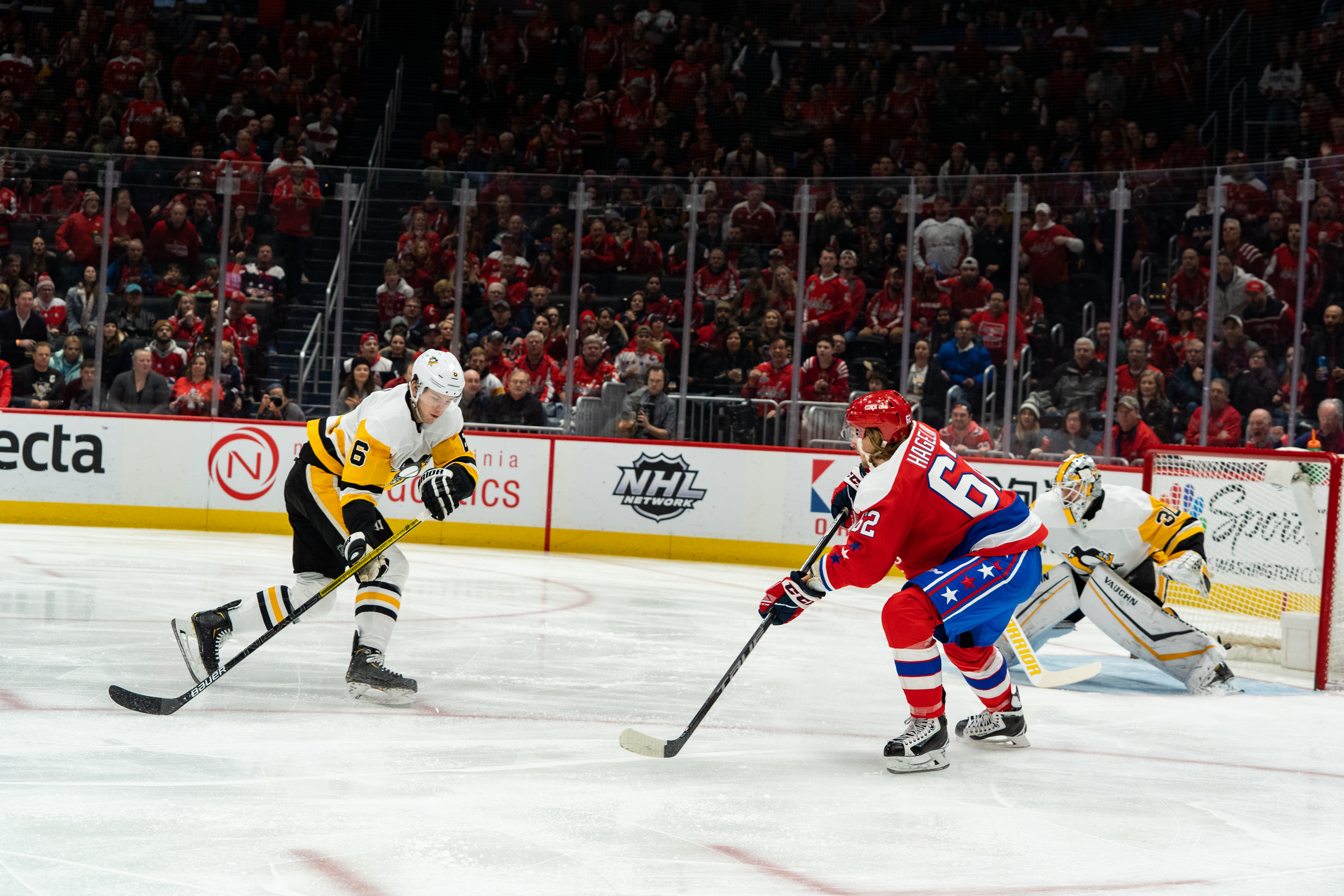
Hagelin (right) being defended by John Marino in 2020.

On 21 February 2019, the Kings traded Hagelin to the Washington Capitals in exchange for a third-round pick in the 2019 NHL entry draft and a conditional sixth-round pick in the 2020 NHL entry draft. The Kings also retained 50% of Hagelin's salary as part of the deal.

On 16 June 2019, the Capitals re-signed Hagelin to a four-year, $11 million contract extension with an annual average of $2.75 million.

Hagelin played on the fourth line with Nic Dowd and Garnet Hathaway throughout the 2020–21 NHL season.

During a Capitals practice on 1 March 2022, Hagelin suffered a severe eye injury, necessitating two surgeries to avoid losing his left eye entirely, and resulting in a partial loss of vision. The following off-season, Hagelin additionally had an arthroscopic procedure on his hip, ruling him out indefinitely; this was further followed by a full hip resurfacing in February 2023, his fourth surgery in the span of a year, which resulted in him missing the entire 2022–23 season. Hagelin ultimately announced his retirement on 30 August 2023, citing ongoing complications from his eye injury.

== Personal life ==
Hagelin was born in Nykvarn and grew up in Södertälje. Hagelin's older brother Bobbie is a former professional ice hockey player for Södertälje SK in the Swedish Elite League and for Rødovre Mighty Bulls in the Danish AL-Bank Ligaen. Carl is the great-grandson of Boris Hagelin. He married long-time girlfriend Erica Uebel on 16 July 2017. They have two children, a daughter, born in 2018 and a son born in 2020.

== Career statistics ==
=== Regular season and playoffs ===
			Regular season					Playoffs
Season	Team	League	GP	G	A	Pts	PIM	GP	G	A	Pts	PIM
2004–05	Södertälje SK	J18 Allsv	14	10	7	17	16	2	0	2	2	0
2005–06	Södertälje SK	J18 Allsv	7	4	8	12	2	—	—	—	—	—
2005–06	Södertälje SK	J20	41	20	20	40	42	4	1	2	3	22
2006–07	Södertälje SK	J20	40	21	34	55	42	3	1	5	6	20
2007–08	University of Michigan	CCHA	41	11	11	22	28	—	—	—	—	—
2008–09	University of Michigan	CCHA	41	13	18	31	32	—	—	—	—	—
2009–10	University of Michigan	CCHA	45	19	31	50	34	—	—	—	—	—
2010–11	University of Michigan	CCHA	44	18	31	49	39	—	—	—	—	—
2010–11	Connecticut Whale	AHL	—	—	—	—	—	5	1	1	2	4
2011–12	Connecticut Whale	AHL	17	7	6	13	6	—	—	—	—	—
2011–12	New York Rangers	NHL	64	14	24	38	24	17	0	3	3	17
2012–13	Södertälje SK	Allsv	8	5	6	11	0	—	—	—	—	—
2012–13	New York Rangers	NHL	48	10	14	24	18	12	3	3	6	0
2013–14	New York Rangers	NHL	72	17	16	33	44	25	7	5	12	16
2014–15	New York Rangers	NHL	82	17	18	35	46	19	2	3	5	6
2015–16	Anaheim Ducks	NHL	43	4	8	12	14	—	—	—	—	—
2015–16	Pittsburgh Penguins	NHL	37	10	17	27	18	24	6	10	16	14
2016–17	Pittsburgh Penguins	NHL	61	6	16	22	16	15	2	0	2	19
2017–18	Pittsburgh Penguins	NHL	81	10	21	31	28	9	2	1	3	2
2018–19	Pittsburgh Penguins	NHL	16	1	2	3	12	—	—	—	—	—
2018–19	Los Angeles Kings	NHL	22	1	4	5	8	—	—	—	—	—
2018–19	Washington Capitals	NHL	20	3	8	11	10	7	0	1	1	0
2019–20	Washington Capitals	NHL	58	8	17	25	16	8	0	1	1	2
2020–21	Washington Capitals	NHL	56	6	10	16	19	5	0	1	1	0
2021–22	Washington Capitals	NHL	53	3	11	14	20	—	—	—	—	—
NHL totals			713	110	186	296	293	141	22	28	50	76

=== International ===
Medal record

Men's ice hockey

Representing Sweden

Olympic Games
Silver medal – second place	2014 Sochi	

World Junior Championships
Silver medal – second place	2008 Czech Republic	

Year	Team	Event	Result	GP	G	A	Pts	PIM
2008	Sweden	WJC	2nd place, silver medalist(s)	6	0	0	0	0
2014	Sweden	OG	2nd place, silver medalist(s)	6	2	0	2	0
2016	Sweden	WCH	3rd	4	0	1	1	0
Junior totals				6	0	0	0	0
Senior totals				10	2	1	3	0

== Awards and honours ==
Awards	Year
College
CCHA All-Tournament Team	2010
All-CCHA First Team	2011
AHCA West Second-Team All-American	2011
NHL
Stanley Cup champion	2016, 2017

Awards and achievements
Preceded by Tommy Wingels	CCHA Best Defensive Forward; 2010–11	Succeeded by Luke Glendening
