= Shaker Verlag =

German publishing house

- Genre: Publishing house
- Founded: 1986
- Founder: Dr. Chaled Shaker
- Headquarters: Düren / Maastricht, Germany
- Area served: Europe
- Products: books
- Website: http://www.shaker.de

Shaker Verlag is a German publishing house located in Düren and Maastricht, established in 1986 by Dr. Chaled Shaker. Shaker Verlag is a publisher of scientific literature, especially monographs and dissertations. More than 20,000 books are in stock, many of them in English, also sold as PDF-files for immediate download. In addition, more than 400 series have been published (publications by scientific institutions, research results as well as conference and congress proceedings of European events and meetings).

In 2007, the subsidiary Shaker Media GmbH in Herzogenrath was formed to promote a hybrid solution combining the original publishing activity and modern Print on demand technology. In contrast to the main business, this company addresses the general book market. Similar to other Book on Demand services, anyone can upload a finished book without additional costs.

== Criticism ==
Similarly to OmniScriptum, Shaker Verlag has been criticised of their lack of rigorous editing and non-existent peer review.

The house is recognised to have no academic reputation because of the lack of quality criteria.

Furthermore, Shaker Verlag has been criticised for their aggressive e-mail campaigns.
