= John Baines (Egyptologist) =

British Egyptologist and academic

John Robert Baines (born 17 March 1946) is a retired British Egyptologist and academic. From 1976 to 2013, he was a Professor of Egyptology at the University of Oxford and a fellow of The Queen's College, Oxford. He is a Fellow of the British Academy and has held numerous visiting professorships internationally.

== Early life ==
Baines was born on 17 March 1946. He is the oldest son of Edward Russell Baines and his wife Dora Margaret Jean (née O’Brien). He was educated at Winchester College, an all boys public boarding school in Winchester, Hampshire, England.

He studied at the University of Florence in 1963–64 before going to the University of Oxford in 1964, where he held an undergraduate scholarship (1964-67) and graduated with a First Class Bachelor of Arts in Ancient Egyptian with Akkadian in 1967. He continued as a graduate student at Oxford from 1967, holding a Major State Studentship and, from 1968, a graduate scholarship at Linacre College.He earned his Doctor of Philosophy degree (DPhil) in 1976.

== Academic career ==
=== Durham and early Oxford appointments ===
Baines began teaching at the University of Oxford from 1968 as a graduate student, later covering the full range of Egyptology courses. He was University Lecturer in Egyptology at the University of Durham from 1970 to 1975, and Laycock Student of Egyptology at Worcester College, Oxford, from 1973 to 1975.

=== Professor of Egyptology, Oxford ===
Baines was a Professor of Egyptology at the University of Oxford from 1976 to 2013, one of the youngest professors at the university at the age of 30. On his appointment he became a Professorial Fellow of The Queen's College. During his tenure he redesigned the undergraduate BA in Egyptology, introduced the joint BA in Egyptology and Ancient Near Eastern Studies (first examined 2001), and developed courses in Egyptian art and architecture for Classical Archaeology and History of Art. He supervised numerous doctoral students, a number of whom went on to hold university and museum positions in Europe and North America. He retired from full-time academia in 2013 but has continued as a research associate at Oxford and holds an emeritus fellowship at Queen's.

=== Visiting professorships and fellowships ===
Over the course of his career Baines held a wide range of visiting positions, including:

- Visiting Professor, Departments of Anthropology and Oriental Studies, University of Arizona, Tucson (1982, 1988)
- Fellow, Alexander von Humboldt-Stiftung, at Heidelberg University (1982), the University of Münster (1989, 1996), and Leipzig University (2016)
- Visiting Professor, Department of Near Eastern Studies, University of Michigan, Ann Arbor (1989)
- Directeur d'Études invité, École Pratique des Hautes Études, Section des sciences religieuses, Paris (1994, 2003, 2012)
- Martha A. Willcomb Visiting Professor of Ancient Egyptian Art, Harvard University (1995–96)
- Distinguished Visiting Professor, Department of Sociology, Anthropology, Psychology and Egyptology, American University Cairo (1999)
- Norman Freehling Visiting Professor, Institute for the Humanities, University of Michigan (2002–03)
- Visiting professor, Ägyptologisches Seminar, University of Basel (2003, 2011)
- Member, School of Historical Studies, Institute for Advanced Study, Princeton (2009–10)
- Old Dominion Fellow, Department of Art and Archaeology, Princeton University (2014)
- Visiting professor, Faculty of Archaeology, Peking University (2015, under the Oxford–Peking exchange)
- Visiting professor, Münchner Zentrum für Antike Welten, LMU Munich (2019–20)
- Visiting professor, University of Pisa (2022) and University of Naples "L'Orientale" (2023)

== Honours and distinctions ==
Baines was elected a Fellow of the British Academy (FBA) in 2011, the United Kingdom's national academy for the humanities and social sciences. He was elected an International Member of the American Philosophical Society in 2011, and an honorary member of the American Oriental Society (now the American Society for Premodern Asia) in 2012. He served as Vice-President (British International Research Institutes) of the British Academy from 2014 to 2018.

== Research ==
Baines's research covers ancient Egyptian art, religion, literature, and biography; the modelling of ancient Egyptian society; and comparative, anthropological approaches to early civilizations, including comparisons with Mesopotamia, China, and Mesoamerica. With Christopher Eyre and later collaborators, notably Stephen D. Houston, he has written extensively on literacy and writing systems in the ancient world, including a widely cited comparative study of script obsolescence in Egypt, Mesopotamia, and Mesoamerica.

He has also contributed to large interdisciplinary quantitative-history projects, including as a co-author of a 2017 study in the Proceedings of the National Academy of Sciences on the structure of global social complexity, as well as a 2023 study on the relationship between complex societies and moralizing religion.

=== Fieldwork ===
Baines took part in two seasons of Egypt Exploration Society excavations at North Saqqara (1968–70), and directed the Egypt Exploration Society's epigraphic expedition at the Temple of Seti I at Abydos for four seasons (1979, 1981, 1983, 1988). He has led or advised on several long-term digital humanities projects, including serving as grant holder for the Electronic Text Corpus of Sumerian Literature following the death of its originator, Jeremy Black. In 2008, on behalf of the Griffith Institute, he arranged for Oxford to take over the Annual Egyptological Bibliography from Leiden, securing John Fell Fund support to relaunch it as the Online Egyptological Bibliography, on which he continued as an Oxford participant.

== Editorial and professional service ==
Baines was editor of the Griffith Institute Monographs series from 1993 to 2013 and editor-in-chief of the Studies in Egyptology and Ancient Near East series published by Equinox. He has served on the editorial and advisory boards of several journals and on the editorial board of the UCLA Encyclopedia of Egyptology. Within Oxford, he chaired the Board of the Faculty of Oriental Studies (1989–91) and the Committee of Management of the Griffith Institute (2004–07), and served on the UK's Research Assessment Exercise/Research Excellence Framework archaeology panels in 1999–2001, 2005–08, and 2011–2014. In 2014, as part of its 75th-anniversary celebrations, the Griffith Institute named him one of a few Honorary Research Associates.

== Publications ==
=== Books ===
- (with Jaromir Malek) Atlas of Ancient Egypt (1980) ISBN 0-87196-334-5
- Fecundity Figures: Egyptian Personification and the Iconology of a Genre (1987) ISBN 0-86516-122-4
- Pyramid Studies and Other Essays Presented to I.E.S. Edwards (1988) ISBN 0-85698-106-0
- (Contributor) Religion in Ancient Egypt: Gods, Myths, and Personal Practice (1991) ISBN 0-8014-9786-8
- (Translator of Erik Hornung's), Conceptions of God in Ancient Egypt: the One and the Many (1982) ISBN 0-8014-1223-4
- Stone Vessels, Pottery and Sealings from the Tomb of Tutankhamun (1994) ISBN 0-900416-63-7
- High Culture and Experience in Ancient Egypt (2000) ISBN 0-485-93010-2
- Fecundity Figures (2001) ISBN 0-900416-78-5
- Visual and Written Culture in Ancient Egypt (2007) ISBN 0-19-815250-7
- Baines, John; Bennet, John; Houston, Stephen, eds. (2008). The disappearance of writing systems: perspectives on literacy and communication. London: Equinox. ISBN 978-1845530136.

=== Selected articles ===
- Baines, John (1990). "Restricted knowledge, hierarchy, and decorum: modern perceptions and ancient institutions". Journal of the American Research Center in Egypt 27: 1–23.doi:10.2307/40000070
- Baines, John (2001). "Egyptian letters of the New Kingdom as evidence for religious practice". Journal of Ancient Near Eastern Religions 1: 1–31.doi:10.1163/15692124-00101002
- Baines, John (2006). "Public ceremonial performance in Ancient Egypt: exclusion and integration". In Takeshi Inomata and Lawrence Coben (eds.), Archaeology of performance: theaters of power, community, and politics, 261–302. Lanham MD: AltaMira Press. ISBN 0-759-10876-5.doi:10.5040/9798216418320
- Baines, John (2011). "Presenting and discussing deities in New Kingdom and Third Intermediate period Egypt". In Beate Pongratz-Leisten (ed.), Reconsidering the concept of revolutionary monotheism, 41–89. Winona Lake IN: Eisenbrauns.ISBN 978-1-57506-199-3
- Baines, John (2020). "From living a life to creating a fit memorial". In Julie Stauder-Porchet and Andréas Stauder (eds.), Ancient Egyptian biographies: forms, contexts, functions, 47–83. Wilbour Studies in Egyptology and Assyriology 7. Atlanta: Lockwood Press.doi:10.2307/j.ctv14gpjc8
- Baines, John, and Cao Dazhi 曹大志 (2024). "Material, spatial, and social contexts of early writing: Egypt and China". In Marilina Betrò, Michael Friedrich, and Cécile Michel (eds.), The ancient world revisited: material dimensions of written artefacts, 71–127. Berlin: De Gruyter.doi:10.1515/9783111360805-004
