= Edmund Herzig =

British professor, historian, and author (born 1958)

Edmund Martin Herzig (born February 1958) is a British professor, historian, and author. He is currently the Soudavar Professor of Persian Studies, he is part of the faculty of Oriental studies at the University of Oxford, and also has served (1988–2006) as a lecturer in Iranian studies at the University of Manchester. His principal areas of research are the histories of Iran, the Caucasus, Armenia, and the Armenian people with an emphasis on the Armenians of Iran.

== Education ==
Herzig received his BA in Russian and Persian from the University of Cambridge, while he received his DPhil in Oriental Studies at the University of Oxford. His graduation thesis was entitled 'The Armenian Merchants of New Julfa, Isfahan: A Study in Pre-Modern Asian Trade'.

== Publications ==
- Herzig, Edmund (1991). The Armenian merchants of New Julfa, Isfahan: a study in pre-modern Asian trade (DPhil). University of Oxford.
- Herzig, Edmund (1995). Iran and the Former Soviet South (The Former Soviet South Project). Chatham House. ISBN 978-1899658046.
- Herzig, Edmund (1998). The New Caucasus: Armenia, Azerbaijan and Georgia. Pinter Publishers Ltd. ISBN 978-1855675537.
- Herzig, Edmund; Kurkchiyan, Marina (2004). The Armenians: Past and Present in the Making of National Identity. Routledge. ISBN 978-1135798376.
- Herzig, Edmund; Stewart, Sarah (2011). Early Islamic Iran. I. B. Tauris. ISBN 978-1780760612.
- Floor, Willem; Herzig, Edmund, eds. (2012). Iran and the World in the Safavid Age. I.B.Tauris. ISBN 978-1780769905.
- Azad, Arezou; Herzig, Edmund; Hoyland, Robert; Marquis, Philippe; Wordsworth, Paul, eds. (2026). The City of Balkh: The History, Archaeology, and Culture of a Great Islamicate Capital in Afghanistan 7th to 13th Century CE. Bloomsbury Publishing. ISBN 9781784538170.

== Sources ==
- "Edmund Herzig". University of Oxford - Faculty of Oriental Studies. Archived from the original on 11 July 2016.
- "Edmund Herzig Professor Edmund Herzig, Professorial Fellow in Iranian Studies". Wadham College (University of Oxford).
- "Editors - Professor Edmund Herzig". Soudavar.org. Soudavar Memorial Foundation.
