= Diwakar Acharya =

Nepali Indologist (born 1969)

Diwakar Nath Acharya (born 6 November 1969) is a British-Nepali Indologist specialising in the religious and philosophical traditions of South Asia. Since April 2016, he has been the Spalding Professor of Eastern Religion and Ethics at the University of Oxford and a Fellow of All Souls College, Oxford. He previously taught at the Nepal Sanskrit University (1993–2003), the University of Hamburg (2003–2006), and Kyoto University (2011–2016).

== Selected works ==
- Acharya, Diwakar, ed. (2006). Vācaspatimiśra's Tattvasamīkṣā: the earliest commentary on Maṇḍanamiśra's Brahmasiddhi. Stuttgart: Steiner. ISBN 978-3515088862.
- Acharya, Diwakar, ed. (2015). Early tantric Vaiṣṇavism: three newly discovered works of the Pañcaratra. Paris: EFEO. ISBN 978-2855391526.
- Acharya, Diwakar, ed. (2009). Little Clay Cart. New York: New York University Press/IJC Foundation. ISBN 9780814707296.
