= Professor of Egyptology (Oxford) =

Professorship at the University of Oxford

The position of Professor of Egyptology at the University of Oxford was established in 1924. The post is associated with a fellowship at The Queen's College, Oxford.

== List of Professors of Egyptology ==
The holders of the post have been:

- Francis Llewellyn Griffith, 1924–1932
- Battiscombe Gunn 1934–1950
- Jaroslav Černý 1951–1965
- John Barns 1965–1974
- John Baines 1976-2013
- Richard B. Parkinson 2013–present
