= Spalding Professor of Eastern Religion and Ethics =

Endowed chair at the University of Oxford

The Spalding Professor of Eastern Religion and Ethics is the holder of an endowed chair at the University of Oxford. The Spalding Chair of Eastern Religions and Ethics was established on a trial basis in 1936 with a grant from the Spalding Trust. In 1937, the chair was renewed for a period of 15 years, and in 1949 the trust gave the university a permanent endowment to fund the chair.

== List of Spalding Professors ==
Holders of the Spalding Chair to date have been:

- 1936 to 1952: Sarvepalli Radhakrishnan
- 1952 to 1974: R. C. Zaehner
- 1976 to 1991: Bimal Krishna Matilal
- 1992 to 2015: Alexis Sanderson
- 2016 to present: Diwakar Nath Acharya
