= Exhibitions of artifacts from the tomb of Tutankhamun =

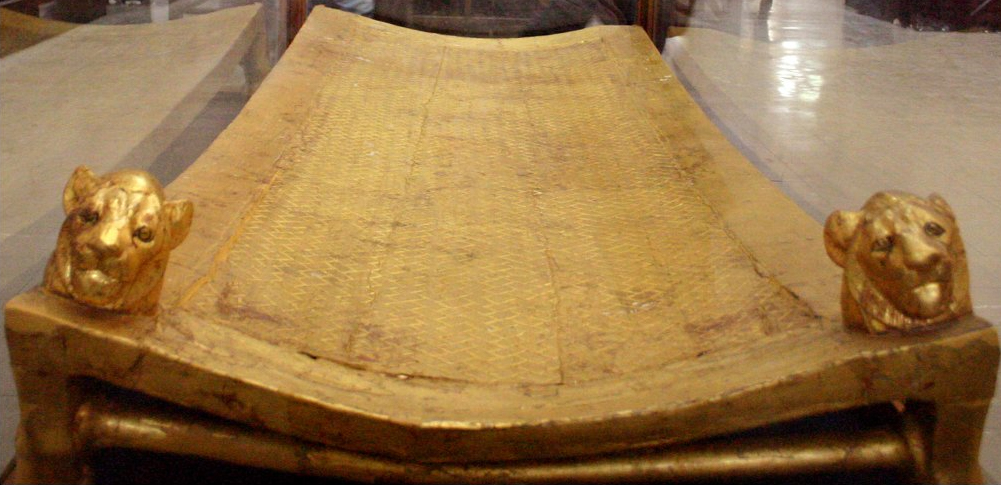
The gilded bier from the base of Tutankhamun's sarcophagus

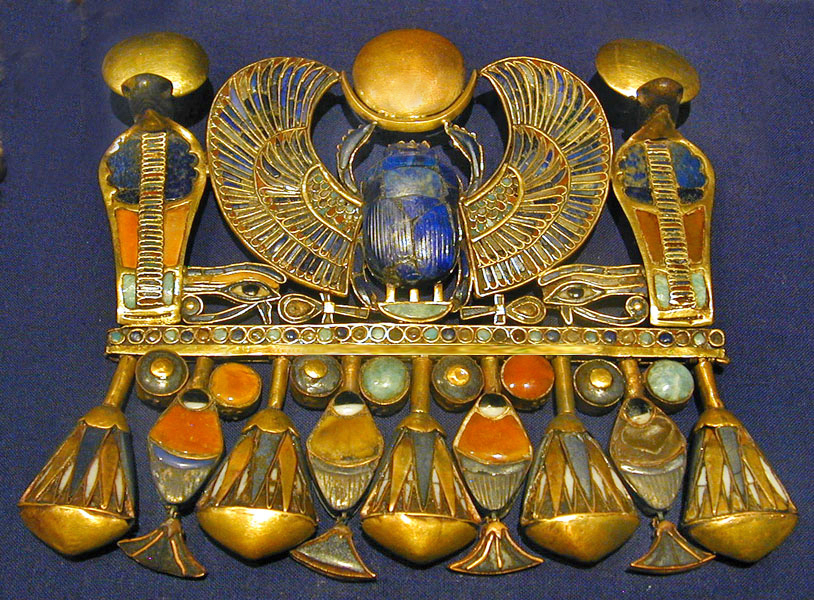
A pectoral belonging to Tutankhamun, representing his prenomen.

Exhibitions of artifacts from the tomb of Tutankhamun have been held at museums in several countries, notably the United Kingdom, Soviet Union, United States, Canada, Japan, and France.

The artifacts had sparked widespread interest in ancient Egypt when they were discovered between 1922 and 1927, but most of them remained in the Egyptian Museum in Cairo until the 1960s, when they were first exhibited outside of Egypt. Because of these exhibitions, relics from the tomb of Tutankhamun are among the most travelled artifacts in the world. Probably the best-known tour was the Treasures of Tutankhamun from 1972 until 1981.

Other exhibitions have included Tutankhamun Treasures in 1961 and 1967, Tutankhamen: The Golden Hereafter beginning in 2004, Tutankhamun and the Golden Age of the Pharaohs beginning in 2005, and Tutankhamun: The Golden King and the Great Pharaohs in 2008. Permanent exhibitions include the Tutankhamun Exhibition in Dorchester, United Kingdom, which contains replicas of many artifacts.

== Ownership and normal display ==
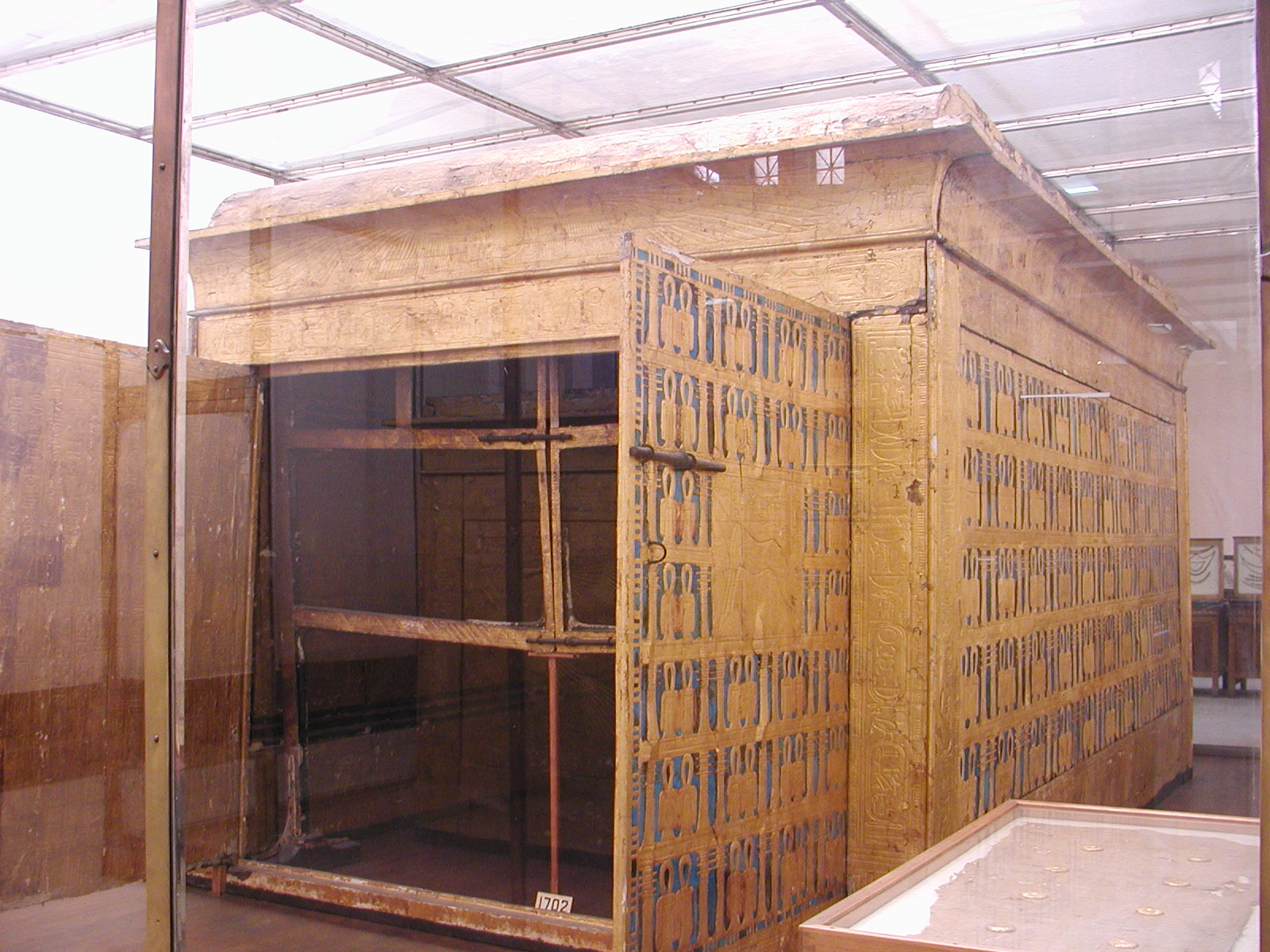
One of the golden shrines, now on display in the Grand Egyptian Museum

All of the artifacts exhumed from the Tutankhamun tomb are, by international convention, considered property of the Egyptian government. Consequently, these pieces are normally kept at the Grand Egyptian Museum in Cairo; the only way for them to be shown internationally is by approval of Egyptian authorities. Although journalists and government officials generally support the tours, some Egyptians argue that the artifacts should remain on display in their own country, where Egyptian school-children would have greater access to them, and where the museum's exhibit would attract foreign tourists.

== Tutankhamun Treasures (1961–1967) ==
The first travelling exhibition of a substantial number of Tutankhamun artifacts took place from 1961 to 1966. The exhibition, titled Tutankhamun Treasures, initially featured 34 smaller pieces made of gold, alabaster, glass, and similar materials. The portions of the exhibition occurring in the United States were arranged by the Smithsonian Institution and organized by Dr. Froelich Rainey, Director of the University of Pennsylvania Museum of Archaeology and Anthropology, with the assistance of Dr. Sarwat Okasha, Minister of Culture and National Guidance of the United Arab Republic. The exhibit travelled to 18 cities in the United States and six in Canada.

The exhibition had a public purpose in mind, to "stimulate public interest in the UNESCO-sponsored salvage program for Nubian monuments threatened by the Aswan Dam project". The exhibition opened in November 1961 at the Smithsonian's National Gallery of Art, in Washington, D.C.

=== Other museums to host the exhibition ===
The exhibition was shown in eighteen cities in the United States and in six cities in Canada.

- National Gallery of Art, Washington, D.C. (November 3–December 3, 1961)
- University of Pennsylvania Museum of Archaeology and Anthropology, Philadelphia, Pennsylvania (December 15, 1961 – January 14, 1962)
- Peabody Museum of Natural History, New Haven, Connecticut (February 1–28, 1962)
- Museum of Fine Arts, Houston, Texas (March 15–April 15, 1962)
- Joslyn Art Museum, Omaha, Nebraska (May 1–31, 1962)
- Field Museum of Natural History, Chicago, Illinois (June 15–July 15, 1962)
- Seattle Art Museum, Seattle, Washington (August 1–31, 1962)
- California Palace of the Legion of Honor, San Francisco, California (September 15–October 14, 1962)
- Los Angeles County Museum of Art, Los Angeles, California (October 30–November 30, 1962)
- Cleveland Museum of Art, Cleveland, Ohio (December 15, 1962 – January 13, 1963)
- Museum of Fine Arts, Boston, Massachusetts (February 1–28, 1963)
- City Art Museum of St. Louis, St. Louis, Missouri (March 15–April 14, 1963)
- Walters Art Gallery, Baltimore, Maryland (May 1–31, 1963)
- Dayton Art Institute, Dayton, Ohio (June 15–July 15, 1963)
- Detroit Institute of Arts, Detroit, Michigan (August 1–September 1, 1963)
- Toledo Museum of Art, Toledo, Ohio (September 15–October 15, 1963)
- Virginia Museum of Fine Arts, Richmond, Virginia (November 8–December 8, 1963)
- Montreal Museum of Fine Arts, Montreal, Quebec (January 23–February 23, 1964)
- National Gallery of Canada, Ottawa, Ontario (March 5–April 5, 1964)
- United Arab Republic Pavilion, 1964 World's Fair, New York City, New York (April 22–October 18, 1964)
- Royal Ontario Museum, Toronto, Ontario (November 6–December 6, 1964)
- Manitoba Legislative Building, Winnipeg, Manitoba (December 18, 1964 – January 17, 1965)
- Vancouver Art Gallery, Vancouver, British Columbia (January 23–February 28, 1965)

=== Japan (1965–1966) ===
From 1965 to 1966 an enlarged version of the 1961–1965 North America tour took place in Japan. The Japanese exhibition saw nearly 3 million visitors.

- Tokyo National Museum, Tokyo, Japan (August 21–October 1965)
- Kyoto, Japan (October–November 1965)
- Fukuoka Prefectural Culture Center, Fukuoka, Japan (December 1965–January 1966)

=== France (1967) ===
The French exhibit saw an attendance of 1,240,975 (It was titled Tutankhamun and His Time and had 45 pieces on display)

- Petit Palais, Paris, France (February 17–September 4, 1967)

== The Treasures of Tutankhamun (1972–1981) ==
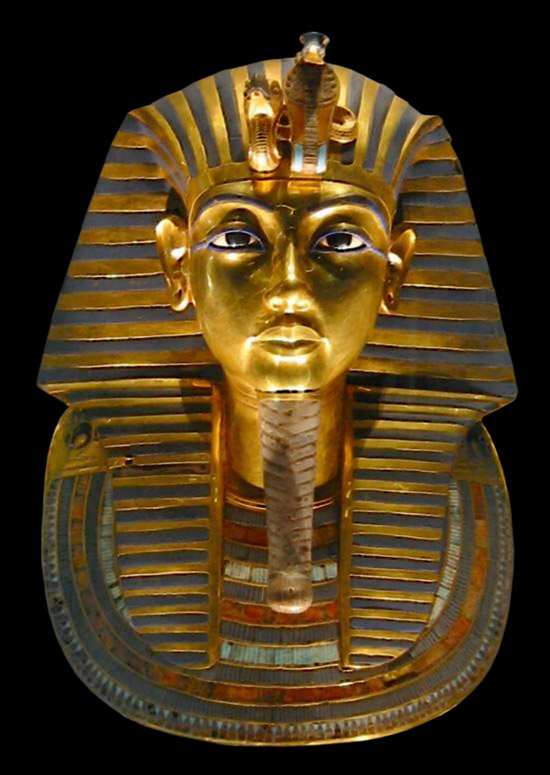
The iconic burial mask of Tutankhamun was among the most popular pieces in the Treasures of Tutankhamun exhibition.

The genesis of the Treasures of Tutankhamun exhibition reflected the changing dynamic of Middle East relations.

=== United Kingdom ===
It was first shown in London at the British Museum in 1972. After a year of negotiations between Egypt and the United Kingdom, an agreement was signed in July 1971. Altogether, 50 pieces were chosen by the directors of the British Museum and the Cairo Museum to be shown at the exhibition, including 17 never before displayed outside Egypt. For insurance purposes, the items were valued at £9.06 million. In January 1972, they were transported to London on two civilian flights and one by the Royal Air Force, carrying, among other objects, the gold death mask. Queen Elizabeth II officially opened the exhibition on March 29, 1972. More than 30,000 people visited in its first week. By September, 800,000 had been to the exhibition, and its duration was extended by three months because of the popularity. When it did close on December 31, 1972, 1.6 million visitors had passed through the exhibition doors. All profits (£600,000) were donated to UNESCO for conserving the temples at Philae, Egypt.

Treasures of Tutankhamun was the most popular exhibition in the museum's history. It is considered a landmark achievement in Egypt–United Kingdom relations. The exhibition moved on to other countries, including the USSR, US, Canada, and West Germany.

=== United States ===
Egyptian cultural officials initially stalled prospects of an American tour, as Egypt was then more closely aligned with the Soviet Union, where fifty pieces had toured in 1973. However, relations thawed later that year when the U.S. interceded following the Yom Kippur War to sponsor a ceasefire and consequently a peace treaty between Egypt and Israel. U.S. president Richard Nixon thereafter visited Egypt, becoming the first American President to do so since the Second World War, and personally prevailed upon Egyptian president Anwar Sadat to permit the artifacts to tour the United States – with the U.S. tour including one more city than the Soviet tour had included, and several additional pieces. The showing was the largest of Tutankhamun's artifacts, with 53 pieces.

The Metropolitan Museum of Art organized the U.S. exhibition, which ran from November 17, 1976, through September 30, 1979. More than eight million attended. The Metropolitan's exhibition was designed to recreate for visitors the drama of the 1922 discovery of the treasure-filled tomb. Included along with original objects excavated from the tomb were reprints from glass plate negatives in the Metropolitan's collection of the expedition photographer Harry Burton's photographs documenting the excavation's discoveries step by step. The Smithsonian described the exhibit as one of the initial "blockbuster exhibits" which sparked the museum community's interest in such exhibitions.

After the six U.S. tour locations were named, San Francisco citizens bombarded the Mayor's Office with inquiries as to why the tour was not coming there. As a result, museum trustees flew to Egypt to meet with the Egyptian Museum in Cairo, where they worked out a mutual agreement for a seventh stop. Profits after exhibition expenses resulted in $10+ million going to the Egyptian Museum for refurbishing.

=== Other museums to host the exhibition ===
After the exhibition left London in 1972, it toured the USSR from 1973 to 1975.

- Pushkin Museum of Fine Arts, Moscow (December 1973–May 1974)
- Hermitage Museum, Saint Petersburg (July 1974–November 1974)
- National Art Museum of Ukraine, Kiev (January 1975–March 1975)

During the years 1976 to 1979 the exhibition was shown in the United States. While at the following venues, the exhibit attracted more than eight million visitors: (NGA)

- National Gallery of Art, Washington, D.C. (November 17, 1976 – March 15, 1977) – 836,000 visitors in over 117 days
- Field Museum of Natural History, Chicago, Illinois (April 14–August 15, 1977)
- New Orleans Museum of Art, New Orleans, Louisiana (September 15, 1977 – January 15, 1978)
- Los Angeles County Museum of Art, Los Angeles, California (February 15–June 15, 1978)
- Seattle Art Museum, Seattle, Washington (July 15–November 15, 1978)
- Metropolitan Museum of Art, New York City, New York (December 15, 1978 – April 15, 1979)
- M. H. de Young Memorial Museum, San Francisco, California (June 11–September 30, 1979)

After the exhibit left the U.S. it went to:

- Art Gallery of Ontario, Toronto, Ontario, Canada (November 1–December 31, 1979)
- Egyptian Museum of Berlin, Berlin, West Germany (February 16–May 26, 1980)
- Kölnisches Stadtmuseum, Cologne, West Germany (June 21–October 19, 1980)
- Haus der Kunst, Munich, West Germany (November 22–February 1, 1981)
- Kestner-Museum, Hanover, West Germany (February 20–April 26, 1981)
- Museum für Kunst und Gewerbe, Hamburg, West Germany (May 15–July 19, 1981)

While the exhibition was on display in San Francisco, Police Lieutenant George E. LaBrash suffered a minor stroke as he guarded the treasures after hours. He later filed a lawsuit against the city on the theory that his injury had resulted from the legendary curse of the pharaohs.

== Tutankhamun and the Golden Age of the Pharaohs (2004-2011) ==
Originally entitled Tutankhamen: The Golden Hereafter, this exhibition is made up of fifty artifacts from Tutankhamun's tomb as well as seventy examples of funerary goods from other 18th Dynasty tombs. The tour of the exhibition began in 2004 in Basel, Switzerland and went to Bonn, Germany on the second leg. The European tour was organized by the Art and Exhibition Hall of the Federal Republic of Germany, the Supreme Council of Antiquities (SCA), and the Egyptian Museum in cooperation with the Antikenmuseum Basel and Sammlung Ludwig. Deutsche Telekom sponsored the Bonn exhibition.

Tutankhamun and the Golden Age of the Pharaohs consists of the same items from the Germany and Switzerland tour but in a slightly different exhibition. Of the 50 artifacts from the Tutankhamun tomb fewer than ten were repeated from the 1970s exhibition. This exhibition began in 2005, and was directed by Egypt's Supreme Council of Antiquities, together with Arts and Exhibitions International and the National Geographic Society.

=== Exhibition overview ===
Tutankhamun and the Golden Age of the Pharaohs was displayed in the following venues.

- Los Angeles County Museum of Art, Los Angeles, California (June 16–November 15, 2005)
- Museum of Art Fort Lauderdale, Fort Lauderdale, Florida (December 15, 2005 – April 23, 2006)
- Field Museum of Natural History, Chicago, Illinois (May 26, 2006 – January 1, 2007)
- Franklin Institute, Philadelphia, Pennsylvania (February 3–September 30, 2007)
- The O2, London, United Kingdom (November 15, 2007 – August 31, 2008)
- Dallas Museum of Art, Dallas, Texas (October 2008 – May 2009)
- De Young Museum, San Francisco, California (June 27, 2009 – March 28, 2010)
- Discovery Times Square Exposition, New York City, New York (April 23, 2010 – January 11, 2011)
- Melbourne Museum, Melbourne, Australia (April – December 2011)

=== Artifacts on display ===
Tutankhamun and the Golden Age of the Pharaohs displays actual items excavated from tombs of ancient Egyptian Pharaohs. From 130 authentic artifacts presented, 50 were found specifically during the excavations of Tutankhamun's tomb. The exhibition includes 80 exhibits from the reigns of Tutankhamun's immediate predecessors in the Eighteenth dynasty, such as Hatshepsut, whose trade policies greatly increased the wealth of that dynasty and enabled the lavish wealth of Tutankhamun's burial artifacts. Other items were taken from other royal graves of the 18th Dynasty (dating 1555 BCE to 1305 BCE) spanning Pharaohs Amenhotep II, Amenhotep III and Thutmose IV, among others. Items from the largely intact tomb of Yuya and Tjuyu (King Tut's great-grandparents; the parents of Tiye who was the Great Royal Wife of the Egyptian pharaoh Amenhotep III) are also included. Yuya and Tjuyu's tomb was one of the most celebrated historical finds in the Valley of the Kings until Howard Carter's discovery in 1922. This exhibition does not include either the gold death mask that was a popular exhibit from The Treasures of Tutankhamun exhibition, or the mummy itself. The Egyptian Government has determined that these artifacts are too fragile to withstand travel, and thus they will permanently remain in Egypt. The mummy of Tutankhamun is the only known mummy in the Valley Of The Kings to still lie in its original tomb, KV62.

=== Attendance ===
Tutankhamun and the Golden Age of the Pharaohs was expected to draw more than three million people. The exhibition started in Los Angeles, California, then moved to Fort Lauderdale, Florida, Chicago and Philadelphia. The exhibition then moved to London before finally returning to Egypt in August 2008. Subsequent events have propelled an encore of the exhibition in the United States, beginning with the Dallas Museum of Art in October 2008 which hosted the exhibition until May 2009. The tour continued to other U.S. cities. After Dallas the exhibition moved to the de Young Museum in San Francisco, to be followed by the Discovery Times Square Exposition in New York City. In Melbourne, 797,277 people attended the exhibition, breaking Australian box office records.

== Tutankhamun: The Golden King and the Great Pharaohs (2008-2013) ==
This exhibition, featuring completely different artifacts from those in Tutankhamun and the Golden Age of the Pharaohs, first ran at the Ethnological Museum in Vienna, from 9 March to 28 September 2008, under the title Tutankhamun and the World of the Pharaohs. It featured a further 140 treasures from the Valley of the Kings, including objects from the tomb of King Tut.

The exhibition continued in North America with the following itinerary:

- Atlanta Civic Center, Atlanta, Georgia (November 15, 2008 – May 22, 2009)
- Indianapolis Children's Museum, Indianapolis, Indiana (June 25–October 25, 2009)
- Art Gallery of Ontario, Toronto, Ontario, Canada (November 20, 2009 – May 2, 2010)
- Denver Art Museum, Denver, Colorado (July 1, 2010 – January 2, 2011)
- Science Museum of Minnesota, St. Paul, Minnesota (February 18–September 5, 2011)
- The Museum of Fine Arts, Houston, Texas (October 13, 2011 – April 15, 2012)
- Pacific Science Center, Seattle, Washington (May 24, 2012 – January 6, 2013)

== Treasures of the Golden Pharaoh (2018-2021) ==
This exhibition from IMG Exhibitions featured over 150 authentic tomb objects, with many appearing outside of Egypt for the first and last time. It ran from March 2018 to May 2020, touring North America, France and the United Kingdom. A new permanent exhibition for the treasures is being constructed at the Grand Egyptian Museum in Cairo so this is the last time the contents of the tomb will be displayed outside of Egypt.

- California Science Center (March 24, 2018 – January 6, 2019), Los Angeles, California
- Grande halle de la Villette (March 23–September 15, 2019), Paris, France
- Saatchi Gallery, London, England (planned for November 2, 2019 – May 3, 2020, closed early on March 20, 2020)
- The Castle at Park Plaza, Boston, Massachusetts (planned for June 13, 2020 – January 3, 2021, indefinitely postponed)
- Australian Museum, Sydney, Australia (planned for 2021, canceled due to the COVID-19 pandemic)

Due to the COVID-19 pandemic, the exhibition in London closed early on March 20, 2020, and the artifacts were returned to Egypt on August 28 of that year instead of continuing on to Boston and Sydney. A selection of artifacts from the exhibit were put on temporary display in museums in Hurghada and Sharm el-Sheikh pending the opening of the Grand Egyptian Museum.

== Exhibitions of replicas ==
Several exhibitions have been established which feature replicas of Tutankhamun artifacts, rather than real artifacts from archaeological sites. These provide access to pieces of comparable appearance to viewers living in places where the real artifacts have not circulated. The first replica exhibition, a copy of the entire tomb of Tutankhamun, was built only a few years after the discovery of the tomb. This replica was temporary, staged by Arthur Weigall for the British Empire Exhibition at Wembley, in 1924. Modern replica exhibitions exist in Dorchester, Dorset, England, in Las Vegas, Nevada, United States, and even in Cairo, Egypt (where the replica exhibition is intended to reduce the overwhelming traffic to the real locations). A travelling exhibition of replicas titled Tutankhamun: His Tomb and Treasures, featuring several hundred pieces, has been shown in Zürich, Brno, Munich, and Barcelona.

=== Tutankhamun Exhibition, Dorchester ===
The Tutankhamun Exhibition in Dorchester, Dorset, England, is a permanent exhibition set up in 1986 by Michael Ridley as a re-creation of the tomb of the ancient Egyptian Pharaoh Tutankhamun. The exhibition does not display any of the actual treasures of Tutankhamun, but all artifacts are recreated to be exact facsimiles of the actual items. Original materials have been used where possible, including gold. The storyline is based around the famous English archaeologist Howard Carter. The exhibition reveals history from Carter's point of view as he entered the tomb in Valley of the Kings in November 1922.

==== Exhibition sections ====
- The entry section of the Exhibition displays general information about Tutankhamun's life and death.
- A life-size model of Tutankhamun's mummy is displayed. The exhibitors claim that it took more than two years to recreate the mummy. X-ray pictures taken from the real mummy helped to make an exact copy.
- The ante-chamber contains replicas of furniture and Tutankhamun's personal items he had been buried with.
- The burial chamber exhibits replicas of the sarcophagus and coffin of Tutankhamun.
- The Treasure Hall shows recreations of statues and jewels found within the tomb of Tutankhamun. Sitting statue of Anubis, the Golden Throne, Gold Death Mask and statue of guardian goddess Selkit are displayed among other items.

=== Discovering Tutankhamun Exhibition, Ashmolean Museum, Oxford ===
The Discovering Tutankhamun exhibition at the Ashmolean Museum in Oxford, England, was a temporary exhibition, open from July until November 2014, exploring Howard Carter's excavation of the tomb of Tutankhamun in 1922. Original records, drawings and photographs from the Griffith Institute were on display. The complete records of the ten year excavation of the tomb of Tutankhamun were deposited in the Griffith Institute Archive at the University of Oxford shortly after Carter's death. A replica death mask was displayed along with replicas of other items from the tomb.
