= International Association of Egyptologists =

The International Association of Egyptologists (IAE; German: Internationaler Ägyptologen-Verband; French: Association Internationale des Égyptologues; Arabic: الرابطة الدولية لعلماء الآثار المصرية) is the international professional association of Egyptologists. The association is a non-profit organization for the advancement of Egyptology. The IAE was founded in Copenhagen (Denmark) in 1947.

Despite existing for almost 80 years without a formal legal status, in 2026 new banking rules obliged the IAE to become a recognized non-profit organisation. Accordingly, the legal entity of the IAE was registered in Germany as the International Association of Egyptologists e.V. (eingetragener Verein, registered association). The IAE statutes were adapted to comply with current legal standards. Current members are being asked to migrate to the IAE e.V. by 15 December, 2026. The dissolution of the former IAE will be voted on by its membership before December 31, 2026.

Within the framework of the association, questions relating to Egyptological studies are discussed. The association promotes the study of Egyptology in all its aspects on an international level.

The IAE supports projects that are important for the scientific development of Egyptology and the international cooperation of Egyptologists. It also acts as an intermediary in providing funding and human resources for such projects.

The association promotes the understanding of Egyptology among the general public by establishing contacts with support associations and other relevant institutions, and maintaining relationships with them.

The IAE is committed to preserving the cultural and historical heritage of the ancient inhabitants of the Nile Valley, specifically, the heritage of Ancient Egypt and the Sudan.

== Presidency ==
The current Presidency, elected on 11 August 2023, consists of:

- Tarek Tawfik (President), Cairo University;
- Willeke Wendrich (Vice-President), University of California, Los Angeles;
- Richard Bussmann (Secretary General), University of Cologne.

Former Presidents were Torgny Säve-Söderbergh, William K. Simpson, Jaromír Málek, Dietrich Wildung, Christopher John Eyre, James Peter Allen, Chris Naunton, and Laure Pantalacci.

Countries with more than 10 Egyptologists have a National Representative in the IAE Council.

== Online Egyptological Bibliography ==
The Online Egyptological Bibliography, published by the Griffith Institute (University of Oxford) in cooperation with LMU Munich, is supported by the IAE.

== Congresses ==
The association organizes an International Congress of Egyptologists (ICE) every four years. The last of these congresses (ICE XIII) took place in August 2023 in Leiden (The Netherlands).

The ICE split off from the International Congress of Orientalists in Paris in 1973. Since then it has been held at intervals of three or four years in Cairo, various cities in Europe, and in Toronto (Canada).

List of International Congresses of Egyptologists
No.	Year	City
1.	1976	Cairo (Egypt)
2.	1979	Grenoble (France)
3.	1982	Toronto (Canada)
4.	1985	Munich
5.	1988	Cairo (Egypt)
6.	1991	Turin (Italy)
7.	1995	Cambridge (UK)
8.	2000	Cairo (Egypt)
9.	2004	Grenoble (France)
10.	2008	Rhodes (Greece)
11.	2015	Florence (Italy)
12.	2019	Cairo (Egypt)
13.	2023	Leiden (the Netherlands)

== Membership ==
The association has four types of membership:

- Professional Membership: for scholars who have an advanced degree in Egyptology, or in another scientific field but making significant contributions to Egyptology;
- Associate Membership: for non-scholars with a special interest in Egyptology and/or associated with amateur societies. Excluded are persons who are active in the antiquities trade;
- Student Membership: for students at recognized educational institutions, following a degree program in Egyptology;
- Honorary Membership: for individuals who have made a significant contribution to the development of Egyptology. Honorary Members are appointed by the General Assembly.
