= Revue d'Égyptologie =

- Cover of Revue d'Égyptologie, Vol. 50 (1999)
- Discipline: Egyptology
- Language: French

Publication details
- History: 1879–present
- Publisher: Société française d'égyptologie (France)
- Frequency: Annually

Standard abbreviations
- ISO 4: Rev. Égyptol.

Indexing
- ISSN: 0035-1849 (print); 1783-1733 (web)

The Revue d'Égyptologie (RdE) is a scholarly journal published annually by the Société française d'égyptologie with the support of the Centre National de la Recherche Scientifique and the Centre national du livre. The Revue d'Égyptologie publishes articles on the history, archaeology, and art history of the cultures who lived along the river Nile, from prehistory up to the Coptic period in French and English, German and Italian.

== Journal History ==
The journal is the successor of Recueil des Travaux relatifs à la philologie et à l'archéologie égyptiennes et assyriennes which appeared from 1879 to 1923. The Revue d'Égyptologie is thus the eldest French Egyptological journal concerned with the different aspects of the cultures who lived along the river Nile, from prehistory up to the Coptic period (although the Bulletin de l’Institut Français d’Archéologie Orientale has been published for longer under the same title).

== Abstracting and Indexing ==
The Revue d'Égyptologie is abstracted and indexed in Online Egyptological Bibliography; L'Année Philologique; International Bibliography of Periodical Literature on the Humanities and Social Sciences/ IBZ online; ATLA Religion Database; Bibliographie linguistique / Linguistic Bibliography; Scopus; INIST/CNRS; ERIH PLUS (European Reference Index for the Humanities and Social Sciences); CrossRef; Thomson Scientific Links.
