= TT120 =

Tomb of Anen

Theban tomb TT120
- Burial site of Anen
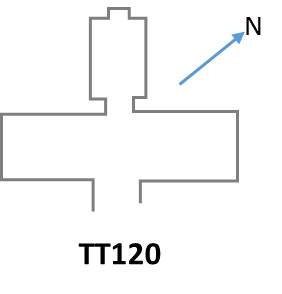
- Floor plan of TT120
- Location: Sheikh Abd el-Qurna, Theban Necropolis
- ← Previous; TT119 Next → TT121

O29 a n n D55
Anen
in hieroglyphs
Era: New Kingdom
(1550–1069 BC)

The Theban Tomb TT120 is located in Sheikh Abd el-Qurna. It forms part of the Theban Necropolis, situated on the west bank of the Nile opposite Luxor. The tomb is the burial place of the ancient Egyptian official Anen, who was the brother of Queen Tiye, and became Chancellor of Lower Egypt, Second Prophet of Amun, sem-priest of Heliopolis, and Divine Father under the reign of Amenhotep III.

== Tomb ==
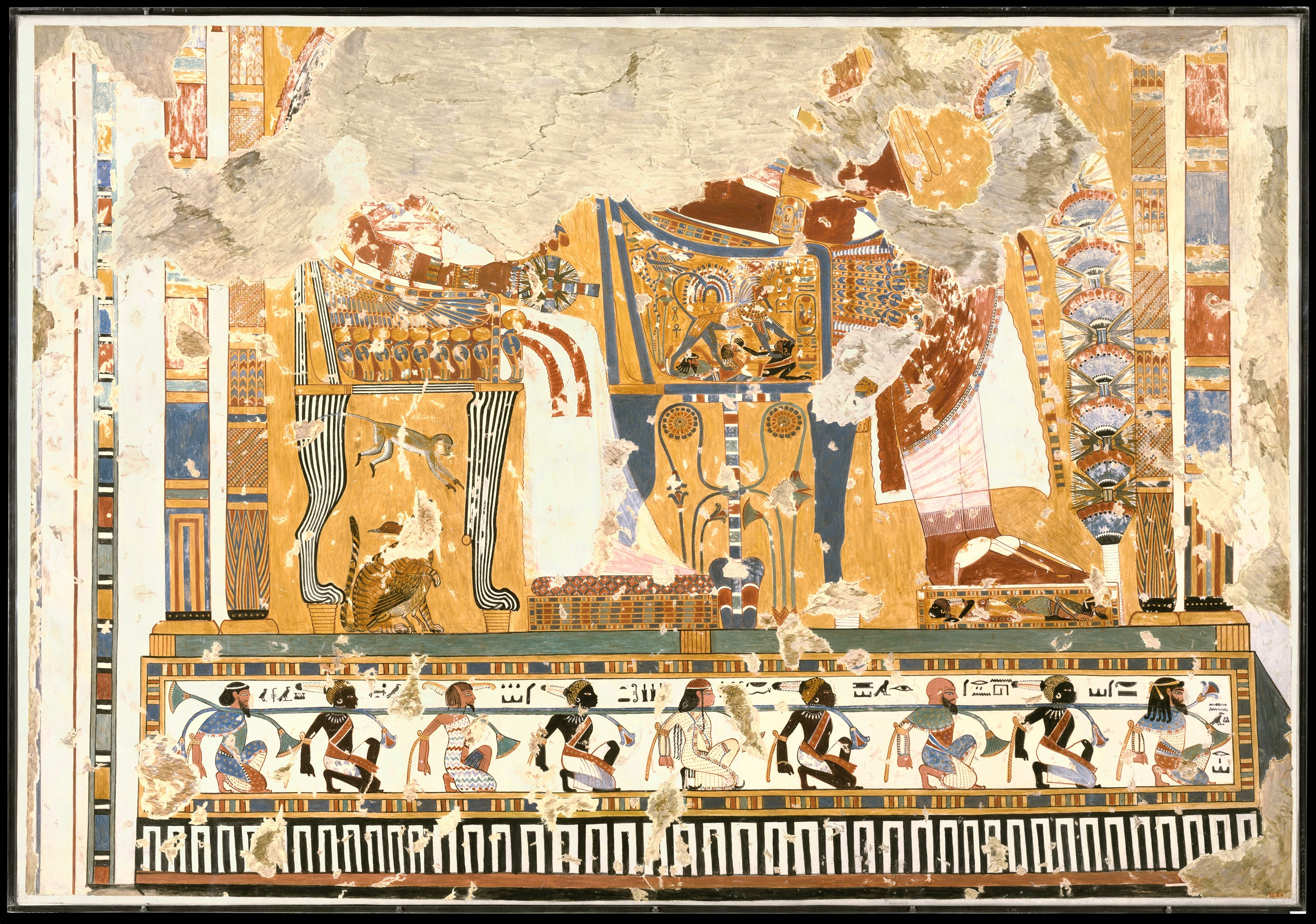
Amenhotep III and Queen Tiye in a kiosk

TT120 is located between the tombs of Senenmut (TT71) and Ahmose (TT121). There is no evidence the tomb was known to early explorers such as Wilkinson, Hay and Lepsius. The tomb was excavated in 1907 by the team of the Metropolitan Museum of Art. It was described in the 1920s by Norman de Garis Davies. In 1935, a passage from TT71 to TT120 was discovered. Since 1995 this tomb and TT89 were part of the Royal Ontario Museum Theban Tombs Project. In 1998, a map of the tomb was published by Kamp.

=== Forecourt ===
TT120 is a rock-cut tomb, and the forecourt is bounded by walls made out of flat stones layered with mud. These walls were covered with stucco. Kamp mentions a pedestal and an Osiris bed, by the facade and the north wall respectively. These structures are made of brick and the exact purposes of them is not clear. The facade of the tomb at the back of the forecourt is badly damaged.

=== Hall ===
The hall had three pillars and an architrave (which has since collapsed). In the rear of the hall is a possible shaft. The walls were decorated with harvest scenes and depictions of Anen and his wife or mother. The ceiling was also decorated. One scene in the tomb shows king Amenhotep III sitting with his wife Tiye. In front of them was depicted Anen. His figure was already destroyed in ancient times. Davies found a late period burial underneath the scene showing Amenhotep III and Tiye.

=== Inner room ===
The inner room is a long narrow room. The South wall depicted offering scenes, the fields of Iaru and boats on a trip to Abydos. The West wall showed scenes from the Book of the Dead, including Anubis leading Anen before the Gods of burial. The inner room appears to have been completed but no evidence of the burial of Anen have been discovered in the tomb.

== See also ==
- List of Theban tombs
