= Jaromír Málek =

Czech Egyptologist (1943–2023)

- Born: 5 October 1943; Pribyslav, Bohemia and Moravia
- Died: 23 May 2023 (aged 79); United Kingdom
- Education: Charles University
- Occupation: Egyptologist

Jaromír Málek (5 October 1943 – 23 May 2023) was a Czech Egyptologist.

== Biography ==
Málek served as keeper of the Griffith Institute of Oxford University and was an editor for Topographical Bibliography from 1968 to 2011. He also maintained seven volumes of Porter and Moss. He published a catalog of four Egyptology rooms at the Ashmolean Museum and kept another catalog of hieroglyphic curses.

Málek was associated with the publication of the atlas Guide Bleu : Égypte by Madeleine Baud and wrote several journal articles for the Journal of Egyptian Archaeology. He served as president of the International Association of Egyptologists for three years.

Jaromir Málek died on 23 May 2023, at the age of 79, in the United Kingdom.

== Publications ==
- The Topographical Bibliography of Ancient Egyptian Hieroglyphic Texts, Statues, Reliefs and Paintings (1964)
- Atlas de l'Égypte ancienne (1980)
- Les égyptiens, à l'ombre des pyramides (1988)
- A Meeting of the Old and New. Saqqâra during the New Kingdom (1992)
- The cat in ancient Egypt (1993)
- ABC of Egyptian Hieroglyphs (1994)
- Egyptian Art (1999)
- Égypte, 4000 ans d'art (2003)
