= TT121 =

Tomb in Theban Necropolis

Theban tomb TT121
- Burial site of Ahmose
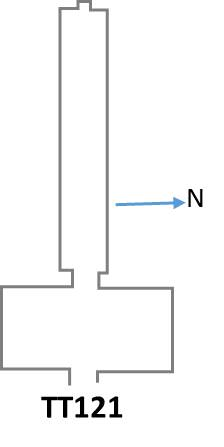
- Floor plan of TT121

- Location within Egypt
- Location: Sheikh Abd el-Qurna, Theban Necropolis
- ← Previous; TT120 Next → TT122

N11 ms s
Ahmose
in hieroglyphs
Era: New Kingdom
(1550–1069 BC)

The Theban Tomb TT120 is located in Sheikh Abd el-Qurna. It forms part of the Theban Necropolis, situated on the west bank of the Nile opposite Luxor. The tomb is the burial place of the ancient Egyptian official Ahmose, who was the second prophet of Amun-Ra at Karnak and later the first prophet of Amun at Henqet-Ankh, the mortuary temple of Tuthmosis III at Qurnah during the reign of the Tuthmosis III.

== Tomb ==
TT121 is located close the tomb of his son Re (TT72) and the tomb of the courtier Senenmut (TT71). The tomb was first excavated by Winlock during the 1930–31 season. At this time inscriptions were copied. The tomb was further excavated by Norman de G. Davies in the mid 1930s.

The tomb appears to never have been completely finished. What was finished was completed by his son Re. The most commonly found title for Ahmose was Second prophet of Amun-Re in Karnak. It appears that the title of first prophet of Amun in Henqet-Ankh was included in the tomb posthumously.

The text on the south wall of the tomb indicates that Ahmose served partially during the co-regency between Tuthmosis III and Amenhotep II.

=== Hall ===
The left thickness shows Ahmose with two women, and further decorations include agricultural scenes and the counting of cattle. The scenes are fragmentary in nature and include offerings to the deceased.

=== Inner room ===
The inner room includes a scene including a barge of Tuthmosis III, decorated with a winged goddess on the side. A hymn to Ptah-Sokari accompanies scenes form the funerary processions. Texts indicate that Ahmose held various titles related to the court. He was a hereditary count and prince, and a confidant of the king in the council chamber. The texts also mention Ahmose's wife Iret, who was a singer of Hathor and a royal ornament.

Ahmose's son Re installed a large stele, which was broken into pieces in antiquity, but the texts were recorded in the 1930s. Another smaller stele was originally set in the niche at the end of the inner room.

In 1998, further scenes were discovered that had previously not been accessible. A scene shows Ahmose with his mother Beket-Ra. This scene is dated to a later time during the tomb construction and records Ahmose as the first prophet of Amun in Henqet-Ankh as well as the seal bearer of the king and the Overseer of Upper and Lower Egypt.

=== Other finds ===
Funerary cones found below the tomb of Senenmut state that Ahmose was a child of the nursery of Queen Meritamun.

== See also ==
- List of Theban tombs
