= Nora Griffith =

Scottish Egyptologist and illustrator

- Griffith in 1900
- Born: Nora Christina Cobban Macdonald; December 7, 1870; Newmachar, Scotland
- Died: October 21, 1937 (aged 66); Oxford
- Resting place: Holywell Cemetery, Oxford
- Monuments: Griffith Institute, University of Oxford
- Occupations: Egyptologist; Philanthropist
- Spouse: Francis Llewellyn Griffith

Nora Griffith (7 December 1870 – 21 October 1937) was a Scottish Egyptologist, archaeologist, illustrator and conservator. On the death of her husband, the eminent Egyptologist Francis Llewellyn Griffith, she founded and endowed the Griffith Institute at Oxford University with their joint fortunes and collections.

== Early life ==
Born as Nora Christina Cobban Macdonald in Newmachar near Aberdeen in 1870, she was the daughter of Surgeon-Major James Macdonald of Aberdeen and Margaret Helen Leslie née Collie and the sister of Sir James Ronald Leslie Macdonald, a Scottish engineer, explorer, cartographer and British Army engineer.

Griffith first visited Egypt in 1906; following which she acted as a conservator in the Archaeology Museum at King's College in Aberdeen. Becoming interested in Egyptology she studied it under the eminent British Egyptologist Francis Llewellyn Griffith at Oxford University. In 1909 she became Griffith's second wife and assisted him in his studies and excavations in Egypt and Nubia in 1910–13, 1923, 1929 and 1930. A skilled photographer and illustrator, she was highly intelligent and had a gift for ancient and modern languages. In 1923 she published her article 'Akhenaten and the Hittites' in The Journal of Egyptian Archaeology.

After her husband's death in 1934 she prepared his unfinished work for publication including his two volume Demotic Graffiti in the Dodecaschoenus, complete with 70 illustrations in addition to photographs taken by herself. She organised and funded further excavations at Firka and Kawa in the Sudan and financially supported the Egypt Exploration Society in its work. She added to and expanded the already large Egyptological library collected by her husband and herself and which was later donated to the University of Oxford and added her own personal fortune to that of her late husband for the building and endowment of the Griffith Institute at Oxford which is dedicated to the advancement of Egyptology and Ancient Near Eastern Studies.

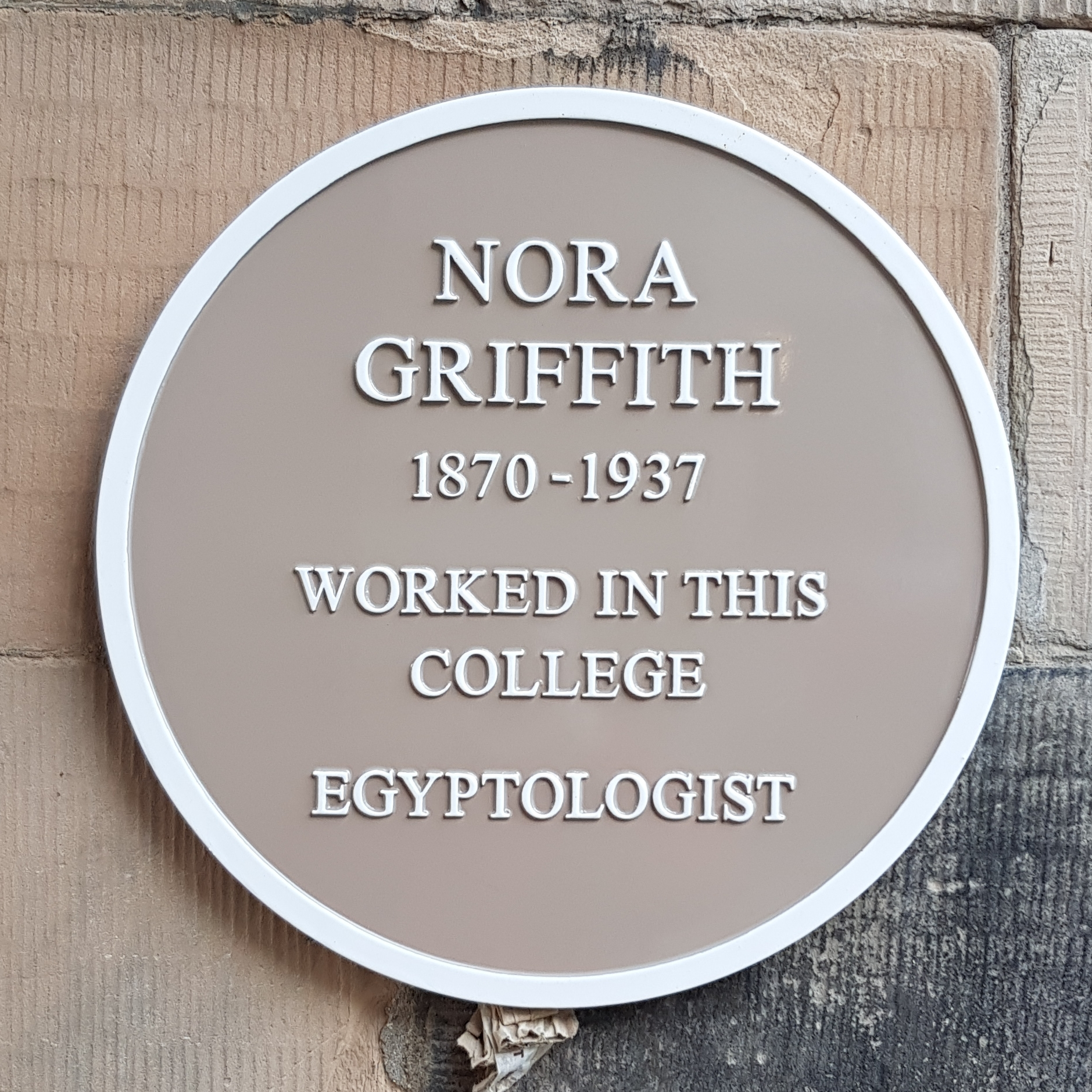
A commemorative plaque to Nora Griffith, displayed at King's College

Nora Griffith died at the Acland Home in Oxford of peritonitis after an appendectomy in 1937 at the age of 66. She was buried with her husband in Holywell Cemetery in Oxford. While she published several articles in scholarly journals, she is frequently overlooked in the records of Egyptology.

== Legacy ==
In addition to her endowment of the Griffith Institute at Oxford, in 2017 Aberdeen City Council approved the erection of a blue plaque to honour her as a "noted Egyptologist". This was unveiled in November 2018 and is located at Kings College Quad in Aberdeen
