= Francis Llewellyn Griffith =

British Egyptologist (1862–1934)

Francis Llewellyn Griffith FBA FSA
- Griffith in 1900
- Born: 27 May 1862; Brighton, England
- Died: 14 March 1934 (aged 71)
- Burial place: Holywell Cemetery, Oxford, England
- Education: Brighton College; Sedbergh School; Highgate School; Queen's College, Oxford
- Occupation: Egyptologist
- Organization: Egypt Exploration Fund
- Spouse(s): Kate Bradbury Griffith (d. 1902); Nora Christina Cobban Macdonald (m. 1909–his death)
- Father: Rev. Dr. John Griffith

Francis Llewellyn Griffith FBA FSA (27 May 1862 – 14 March 1934) was an eminent British Egyptologist of the late 19th and early 20th centuries.

== Early life and education ==
F. Ll. Griffith was born in Brighton on 27 May 1862 where his father, Rev. Dr. John Griffith, was Principal of Brighton College, and also a distinguished mathematician. After schooling at Brighton College (1871), then privately by his father, he went to Sedbergh School, Yorkshire (1875–78) and Highgate School (1878–80). At Highgate he developed the interest in ancient Egypt that was to determine the rest of his life. Griffith was awarded a scholarship to Oxford University in 1879 and studied at The Queen's College from 1880 to 1882: in the absence of an Egyptological department he taught himself ancient Egyptian.

== Career ==
Griffith worked as a student for The Egypt Exploration Fund (EEF) (later known as the Egypt Exploration Society), a society established in 1882 by Amelia Edwards and Reginald Stuart Poole. This society funded excavations in Egypt and provided opportunities for student apprentices to learn how to excavate and give aspiring Egyptologists a chance to publish their findings. Griffith was urged by his professor to write to Flinders Petrie, an Egyptologist working for the EEF, to see if he could serve as an assistant. He could not afford to finance himself, and Petrie and Edwards were able to convince the EEF to fund Griffith through a scholarship. Griffith trained under Flinders Petrie at the Fund's Naukratis excavation. He also presented reports on Tell Nebesheh and Tell Gemayemi during one of the Egypt Exploration Fund early annual meetings. It was in this report that he thanked Petrie, "I cannot conclude without expressing my deep obligations to Mr. Petrie for so freely opening to me the rich stores of method and experience which his unrivalled skill has accumulated." After Petrie left the Egypt Exploration Fund, Griffith continued to work for the society under the direction of Edouard Naville. He obtained a vellum leaf containing a Coptic male homosexual love spell written in Hermopolitan dialect, from an Egyptian avocat named Fanous, which provides the only example in Coptic language of a love spell between men. This document is held and preserved at the Ashmolean Museum with the designation of Ashmolean Parchment AN 1981.940.

== Personal life ==
Griffith married Kate Bradbury (26 August 1854 – 2 March 1902), a good friend of Amelia Edwards, in 1896. Kate died six years later and Griffith eventually inherited his father-in-law's estate. This allowed him to endow the study of Egyptology at Oxford. In 1909 he married Nora Christina Cobban Macdonald (1870–1937), who assisted him in his studies and excavations in Egypt and Nubia in 1910–13, 1923, 1929 and 1930, and prepared his unfinished work for publication after his death. Nora was from Aberdeen, and in 2017 the city council approved erection of a blue plaque to honour her as a "noted Egyptologist".

After the establishment of a post in Egyptology, Griffith was appointed Reader in 1901. He was Professor of Egyptology at the university from 1924 until 1932 and died in 1934.

By the terms of his will the Griffith Institute at the Ashmolean Museum in Oxford was established in 1939, with additional funding from the will of his second wife, Nora. He was buried in Holywell Cemetery in Oxford.

== Works ==
- 1889: The inscriptions of Siut and Dêr Rîfeh. London: Trübner. (online version at the Internet Archive)
- 1898: Hieratic papyri from Kahun and Gurob (principally of the middle kingdom). London: Quaritch. (online version at the Internet Archive)
- 1900: Stories of the High Priests of Memphis: the Dethon of Herodotus and the Demotic tales of Khamuas. Oxford: Clarendon Press. (online version at the Internet Archive)
- 1904–1921: The Demotic Magical Papyrus of London and Leiden. 3 vols. Oxford: Clarendon Press. (online version: vol. 1, vol. 3 at the Internet Archive)
- 1911: Karanòg: the Meroitic inscriptions of Shablul and Karanòg. Philadelphia: University Museum. (online version at the Internet Archive)
