= Anen =

Ancient Egyptian priest, Second Prophet of Amun

- Second Prophet of Amun
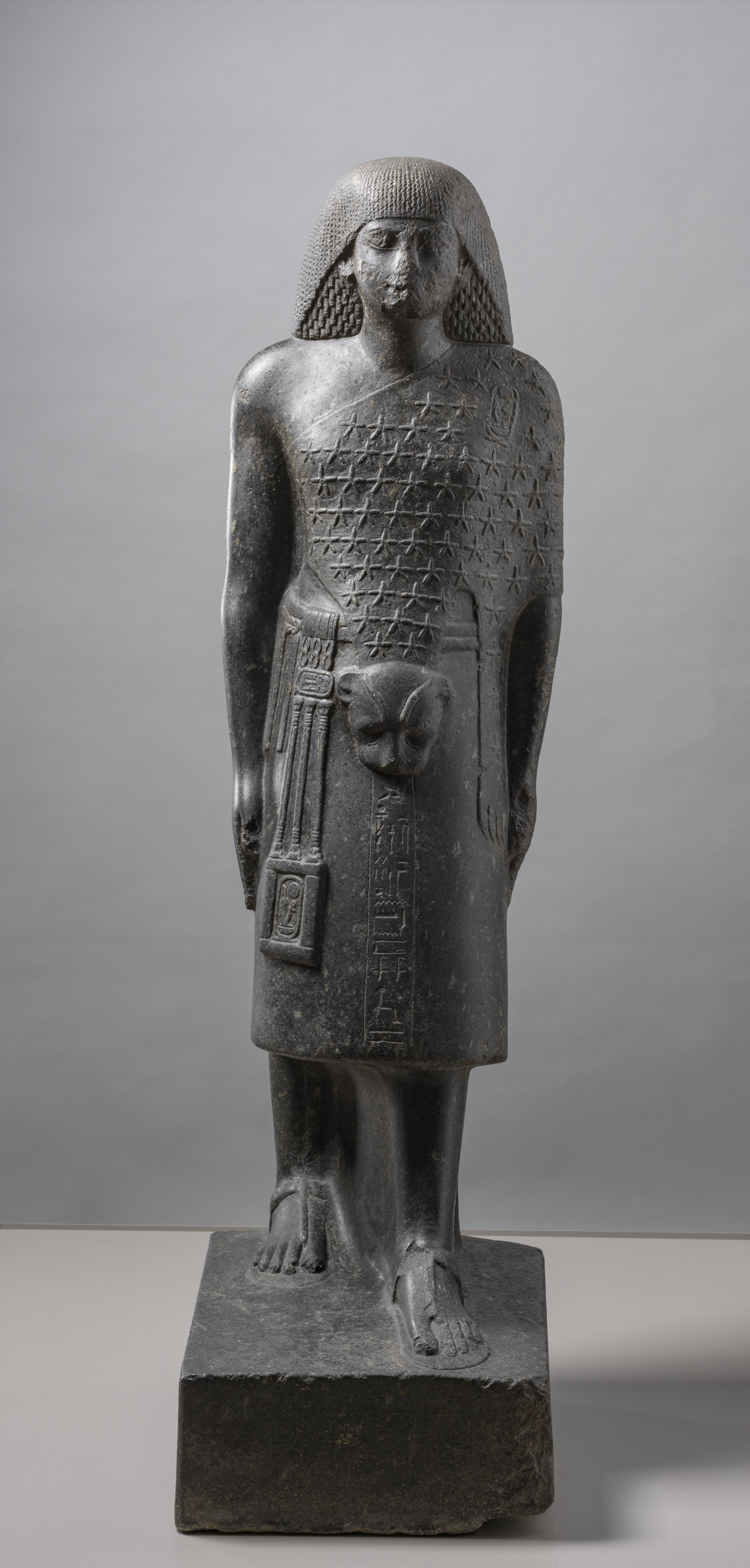
- Museo Egizio, Turin, Statue of Anen, second priest of Amon, Inv.-No. Cat 1377
Egyptian name
O29 D36 N35C D55
ˁȝnn
- Successor: Simut
- Dynasty: 18th Dynasty
- Pharaoh: Amenhotep III
- Burial: TT120
- Father: Yuya
- Mother: Thuya

Anen or Aanen was an ancient Egyptian nobleman and official of the Eighteenth Dynasty. A priest and administrator, his period of royal service occurred largely during the reign of his brother-in-law, Amenhotep III.

== Biography ==
He was the son of Yuya and Thuya and the brother of Queen Tiye, the wife of Pharaoh Amenhotep III. Under the rule of his brother-in-law, Anen became the Chancellor of Lower Egypt, fan-bearer, Second of the Four Prophets of Amun, sem-priest of Heliopolis, Greatest of Seers, High Priest in the temple of Re-Atum.

A surviving statue of Anen is now in the Museo Egizio, Turin (Inv.-No. 5484 / Cat. 1377) and a wooden shabti maybe of the same Anen is now in the Museum Meermanno (Inv.-No. 82/196), The Hague.

Inscriptions on Anen's own monuments do not mention that he was Amenhotep III's brother-in-law. However, this relationship is established by a short but clear reference to him in his mother Thuya's coffin, which stated that her son Anen was the second prophet of Amun.

It is likely that he died before Year 30 of Amenhotep III, since he is not mentioned in texts relating to the pharaoh's Sed festival; in the last decade of Amenhotep's reign another man, Simut, took over Anen's place as Second Prophet of Amun. Simut had been Fourth Prophet of Amun previously.

Anen was buried in his tomb (TT120) in the Necropolis of Sheikh Abd el-Qurna, on the west bank of the Nile opposite Thebes. His son and possibly four daughters are depicted in his tomb, but their names have not survived.
