= Chris Naunton =

British Egyptologist

Naunton in October 2009.

Christopher Hugh Naunton (born 23 February 1978) is a British Egyptologist, a writer and a broadcaster, and an expert on the life of Flinders Petrie.

He studied Egyptology at the universities of Birmingham and Swansea, and obtained his PhD. He has been director of the Egypt Exploration Society and president of the International Association of Egyptologists. In 2013, he presented Tutankhamun: The mystery of the Burnt Mummy on Channel 4 in the UK.

Chris Naunton has been involved in a program for teaching Egyptology and the history of ancient Egypt named Playing in the Past, a T.tv series, based on the reconstructions of the video game "Assassin's Creed Origins", which he considers as "the best visualization of ancient Egypt".

Chris Naunton was involved with the 2017 excavation of the Pyramid of King's Daughter Hatshepsut at Dahshur.

He currently hosts the podcast 'Talk Like an Egyptian', alongside Iszi Lawrence.

== Books ==
- Naunton, Christopher Hugh (2011). Regime Change and the Administration of Thebes During the Twenty-fifth Dynasty. Swansea University.
- Naunton, Chris (24 September 2019). Searching for the Lost Tombs of Egypt. Thames & Hudson. ISBN 978-0-500-77452-6.
- Naunton, Chris; Karsten, Guilherme (28 May 2021). King Tutankhamun Tells All!. Thames & Hudson. ISBN 978-0-500-65255-8.
- Naunton, Chris (2020). Egyptologists' Notebooks: The Golden Age of Nile Exploration in Words, Pictures, Plans, and Letters. Getty Publications. ISBN 978-1-60606-676-8.
