= TT72 =

Theban tomb

Theban tomb TT72
- Burial site of Re
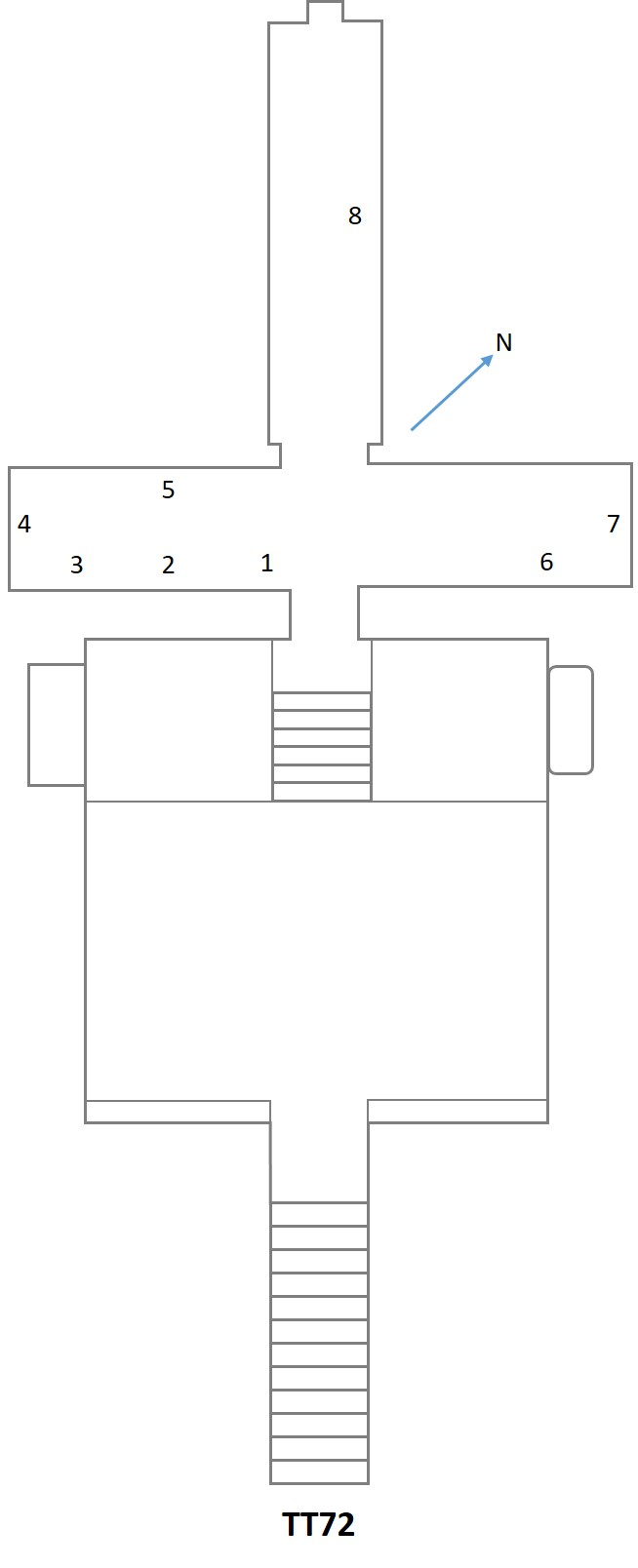
- Floor plan of TT71

- Location within Egypt
- Coordinates: 25°44′00″N 32°36′29″E
- Location: Sheikh Abd el-Qurna, Theban Necropolis
- ← Previous; TT71 Next → TT73

Theban Tomb TT72 is located in the Theban Necropolis, on the west bank of the Nile, opposite to Luxor. It was the tomb of Re, who was the First Prophet of Amun in the Mortuary temple of Thutmosis III. The tomb is located in the necropolis area around Sheikh Abd el-Qurna and dates to the time of Amenhotep II.

Re was the son of Ahmose (TT121), who was a first prophet of Amun and Iret, who was a royal ornament and Singer of Hathor.

== Tomb ==
TT72 has been known for a long time. Lepsius visited and recorded the tomb including the scene depicting Pharaoh Amenhotep II and his mother Merytre-Hatshepsut. The tomb was first excavated by Weigall in 1907, who noted the fact that one has a clear view of the temple of Thutmosis III from the tomb. TT72 is located fairly close to the tomb of Re's father Ahmose, TT121. In 1913–14 Winlock worked at the tomb and mapped it for the Metropolitan Museum of Arts. Winlock investigated monks cells related to the Coptic Monasteries nearby. Smoke damage in the tomb indicates it was used as a kitchen or smoke house during Coptic times.

The exterior of the tomb shows the use of colonnades, terraces and ramps. This construction emulates the overall structure of royal temples, including the temple of Tuthmosis III called Djeser-Akhet, where Re served as First Prophet. Just above the tomb is the cenotaph to an Egyptian Saint. This structure was built on top of the shrine that Re had constructed.

=== Hall ===
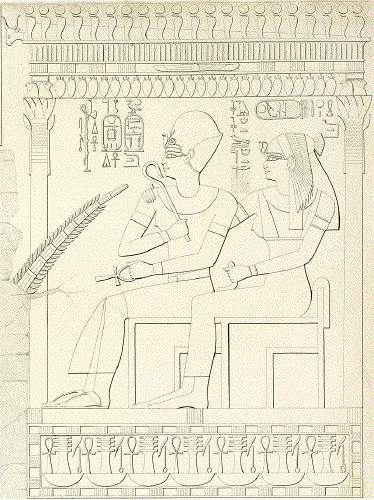
Amenhotep II and his mother Merytre-Hatshepsut as depicted in the hall of the tomb. Lepsius Denkmahler, plate 62

One side of the hall shows several different scenes (numbering refers to the numbering used in Porter and Moss):

1. The deceased offering on behalf Thutmosis II
2. Several registers showing a banquet with a harpist
3. Re seated and offerings to Renenutet as a serpent
4. Amenhotep II hunting ibex and ostriches while riding a chariot
5. Re with relatives making an offering to Amenhotep II and his mother Merytre-Hatshepsut
6. Re seated and family spearing fish
7. Re offering to Osiris.

=== Inner room ===
The inner room is decorated with funerary scenes including the opening of the mouth. The coffin that was presumably initially put in this room was later found in tomb KV35, the tomb of Amenhotep II. The coffin contained the mummy of Ramesses VI.

== See also ==
- List of Theban tombs
