= TT70 =

Theban tomb

Theban tomb TT70
- Burial site of Amenmose
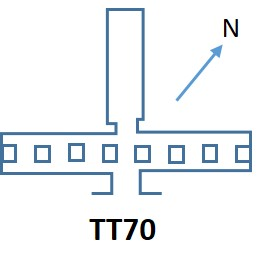

- Location within Egypt
- Location: Sheikh Abd el-Qurna, Theban Necropolis
- ← Previous; TT69 Next → TT71

The Theban Tomb TT70 is located in Sheikh Abd el-Qurna. It forms part of the Theban Necropolis, situated on the west bank of the Nile opposite Luxor. While the original owner of the tomb remains unknown, it was later used as the burial place of Amenmose (Overseer of Artificers of Amun) during the 21st Dynasty. This tomb features decorations from an earlier period which were later expanded when the tomb was usurped.

== See also ==
- List of Theban tombs
