= Hatshepsut (king's daughter) =

Ancient Egyptian princess

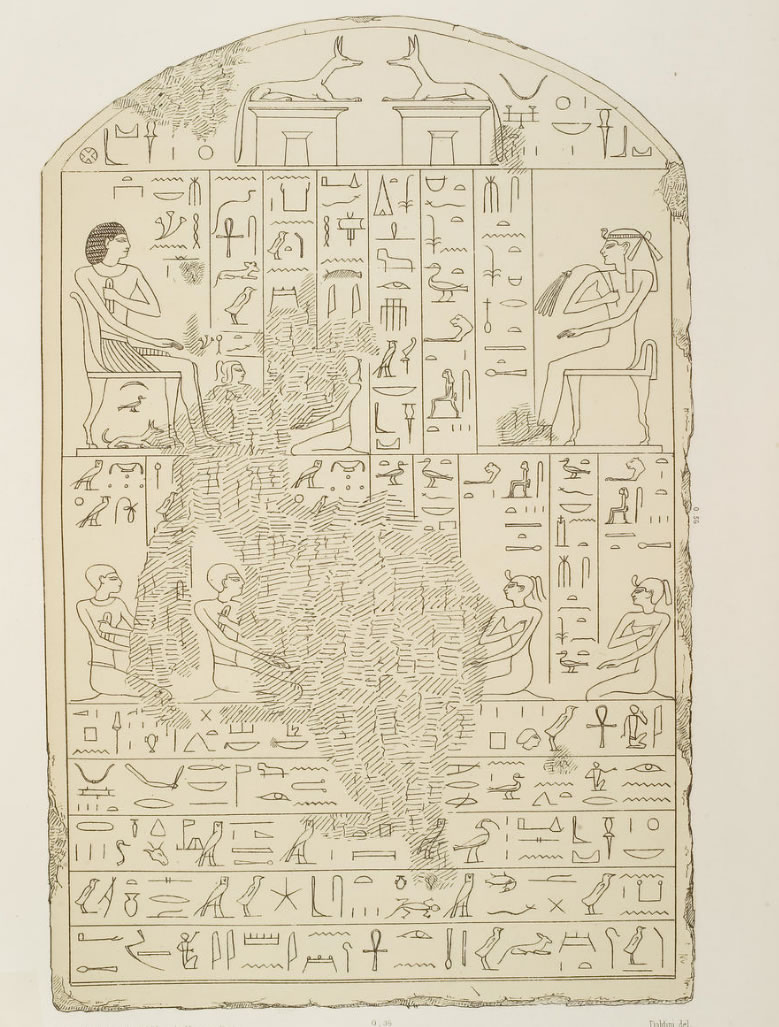
Stela, Egyptian Museum CG 20394

Hatshepsut was the name of one or several ancient Egyptian king's daughter(s) of the 13th Dynasty. There are three instances where a person named Hatshepsut is mentioned. It is not known if these items refer to the same or different individuals.

== Attestations with King's Daughter Hatshepsut ==
Three items referring to a King's Daughter Hatshepsut are known. All attestations seem to date to the early 13th Dynasty.

=== Stela of Nedjesankh/Iu, husband of King's Daughter Hatshepsut ===
At Abydos, a limestone stela was found mentioning a King's Daughter Hatshepsut. In the stela it is stated that she was the daughter of a king's wife Nofret. The name of her royal father is not recorded here. The queen Nofret is not known from other sources. On stylistic grounds, the stela can be dated to the 13th Dynasty.

The stela belonged to the Commander of the [Ruler's] Crew Nedjesankh/Iu who had two wives, Hatshepsut, daughter of King's Wife Nofret, and a second wife with the name Nubemwakh. On the stela is also mentioned her daughter, the lady of the house Nebetiunet. The stela has been published.

=== Scarab-seal of King's Daughter Hatshepsut ===
A king's daughter Hatshepsut is also known from a scarab seal. Ryholt argues the seal is decorated with a spiral cord and can be classified under "Queen Type A", a style used in the time before Sobekhotep III, in the early 13th Dynasty.

=== Pyramid of King's Daughter Hatshepsut ===
==== Pyramid ====
At Dahshur, the Pyramid of King's Daughter Hatshepsut dates to the early 13th Dynasty and was discovered in 2017. It was built of mudbricks encased with white limestone. However, the limestone had been robbed and the mudbricks eroded, so the substructure remained. Outside the entrance was found an alabaster stone engraved with poorly executed funerary inscriptions written in hieroglyphs (Pyramid Texts) and it had the cartouche of king Ameny Qemau. Thus, King's Daughter Hatshepsut seems associated with king Ameny Qemau. Archaeologist Chris Naunton was involved with the excavation. At the end of the Middle Kingdom, this pyramid would have been among the last pyramids built before the Second Intermediate Period.

==== Burial Chamber ====
A burial chamber beneath the pyramid was still sealed with a 10 ton granite stone. Once opened, the contents inside were already heavily disturbed, indicating the burial chamber had been robbed before the chamber was sealed. Inside was found a decorated wooden box thought to be the canopic box naming the king's daughter Hatshepsut, missing the four canopic jars. The box originally stood in a niche in the burial chamber, but was found on the floor. Also found was the fragmented remains of a wooden coffin (later partially reconstructed) carved in a style consistent with a high status female of the Middle Kingdom with a Hathor-wig. There was no mummy, but bones found indicate the tomb was used.
