= Nofret (13th dynasty) =

Royal Wife in Thirteenth Dynasty

- King's Wife
- Burial: Dahshur?
- Spouse: Ameny Qemau?
- Issue: Hatshepsut (King's Daughter)
- Dynasty: early Thirteenth Dynasty
- Religion: Ancient Egyptian religion

nfr r&t
Nofret
in hieroglyphs
Era: Middle Kingdom
(2055–1650 BC)

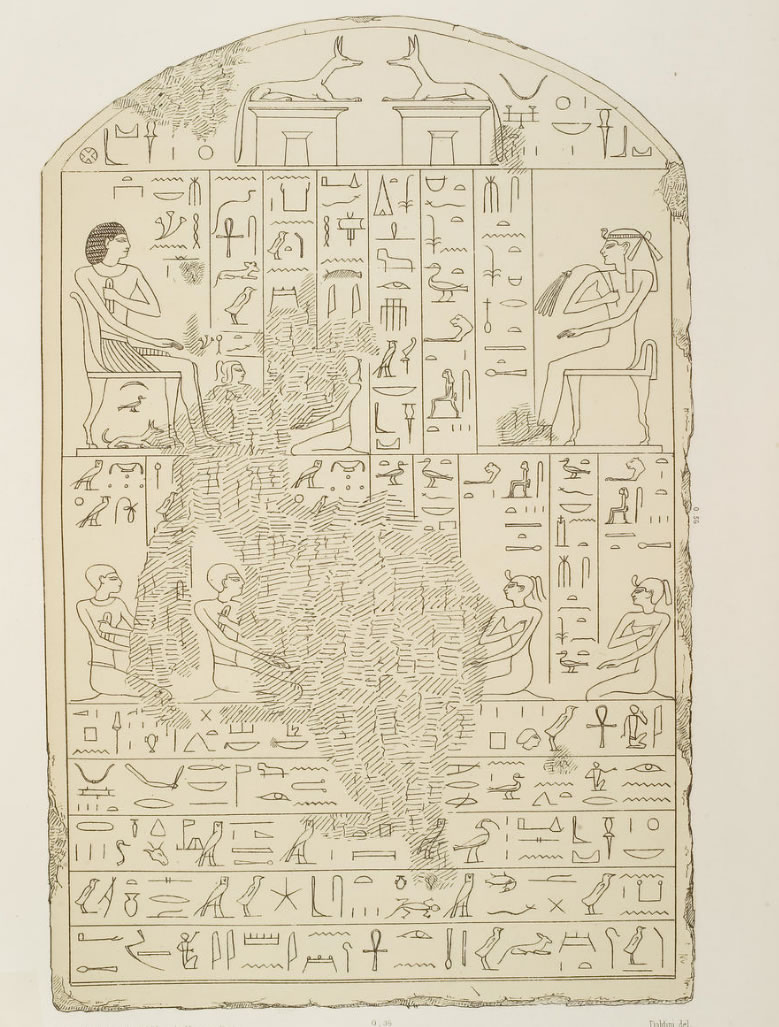
Stela mentioning the queen Nofret

Nofret (Neferet) was an ancient Egyptian king's wife, most likely dated to the early Thirteenth Dynasty. She might have been the wife of king Ameny Qemau.

== Attestation ==
She is so far only known from one stela found at Abydos that is today in the Egyptian Museum in Cairo. The stela dates most likely to the 13th Dynasty and belongs to the commander of the ruler's crew {3tw n tt hq3} Nedjesankh/Iu. His wife was the king's daughter Hatshepsut. The text states that the latter was born to the king's wife Nofret. Not much can be said about her. Her royal husband is not yet identified.

At Dahshur, a pyramid of King's Daughter Hatshepsut has been associated with king Ameny Qemau, making Nofret a possible wife of this king. If her husband and daughter were buried at Dahshur, it is likely she also was buried at this location.
