= Yuya =

Ancient Egyptian high priest

- King’s Lieutenant; Master of the Horse; Father-of-the-god
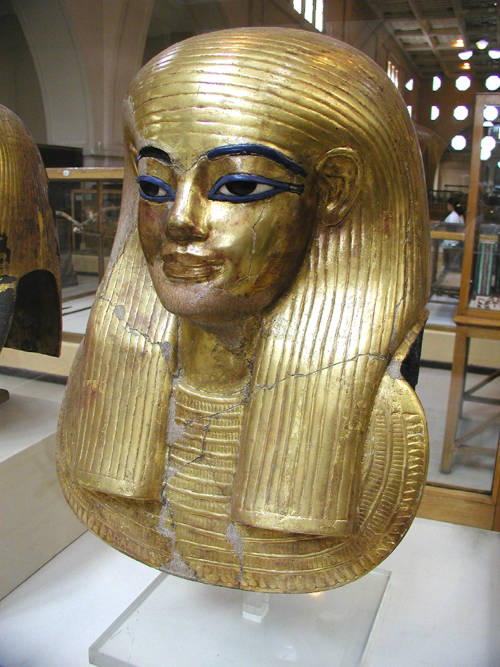
- Gilded mummy mask of Yuya, now in the Cairo Museum
Egyptian name
i i w i A A1
- Dynasty: 18th Dynasty
- Pharaoh: Amenhotep III
- Burial: KV46
- Spouse: Thuya
- Children: Tiye, Anen, possibly Ay

Yuya (sometimes Iouiya, or Yuaa, also known as Yaa, Ya, Yiya, Yayi, Yu, Yuyu, Yaya, Yiay, Yia, and Yuy c. 1430 BC - c. 1374 BC) was a powerful ancient Egyptian courtier during the 18th Dynasty of Egypt. He was married to Thuya, an Egyptian noblewoman associated with the royal family, who held high offices in the governmental and religious hierarchies. Their daughter, Tiye, became the Great Royal Wife of Amenhotep III. Yuya and Thuya are known to have had a son named Anen, who carried the titles "Chancellor of Lower Egypt", "Second Prophet of Amun", "Sm-priest of Heliopolis", and "Divine Father".

They may also have been the parents of Ay, an Egyptian courtier active during the reign of Akhenaten, who eventually became pharaoh. There is no conclusive evidence, however, regarding the kinship of Yuya and Ay, although certainly both men came from the town of Akhmim.

The tomb of Yuya and Thuya was, until the discovery of Tutankhamun's, one of the most spectacular ever found in the Valley of the Kings despite Yuya not being a pharaoh. Although the burial site was robbed in antiquity and all the jewels in the jewellry box furniture had been stolen by tomb robbers, many objects not considered worth plundering by the robbers remained. Both the mummies were in a state of excellent preservation. Their faces in particular were relatively undistorted by the process of mummification.

== Origins ==
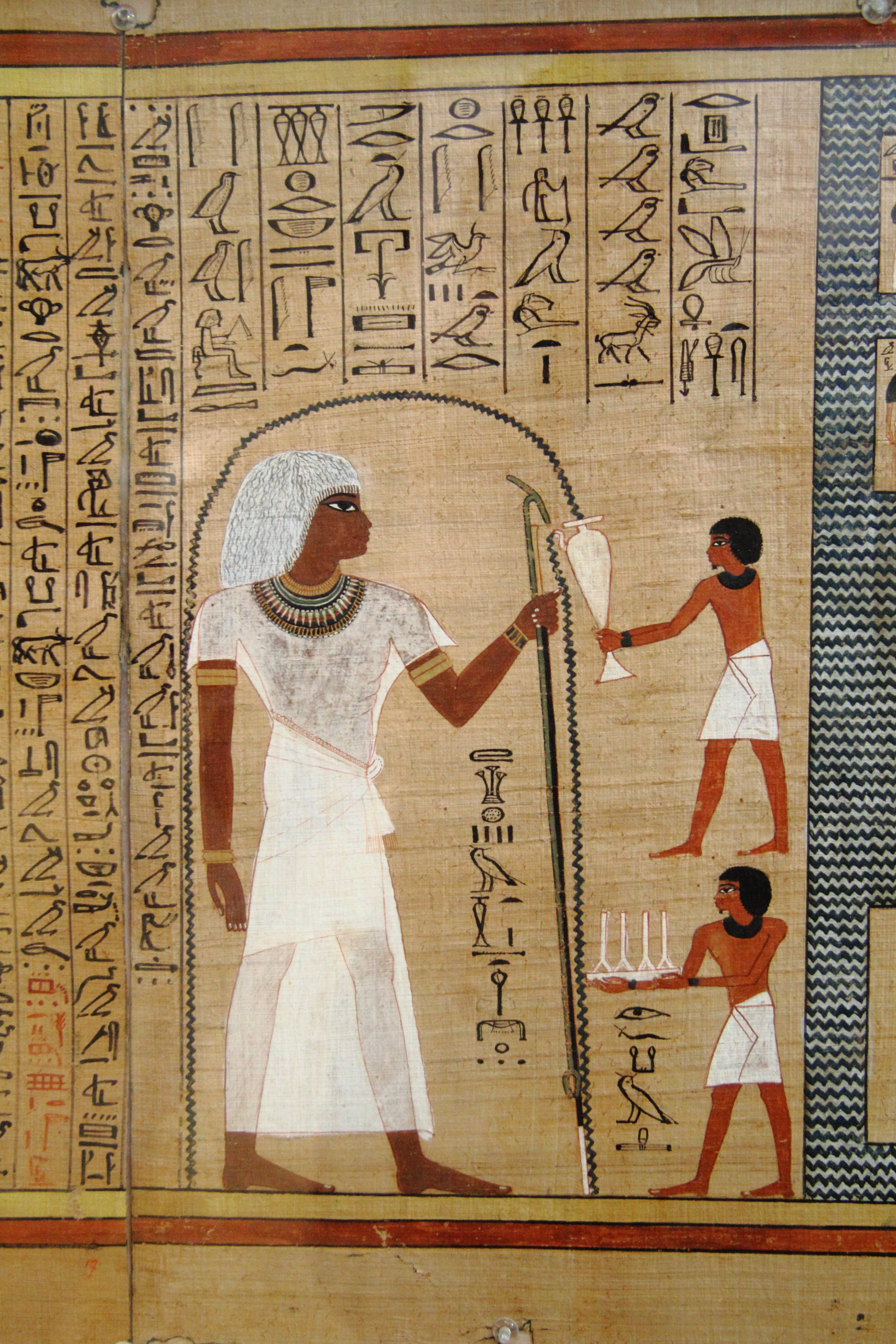
Depiction of Yuya in his copy of the Book of the Dead

Yuya came from the Upper Egyptian town of Akhmim, where he probably owned an estate and was a wealthy member of the town's local nobility. His origins remain unclear. In his study of Yuya's mummy the anatomist Grafton Smith noted that although his features are not classically Egyptian, he considers that there was much migration from neighbouring countries throughout Egyptian history and "it would be rash to offer a final opinion on the subject of Yuaa's nationality." James Quibell likewise addressed the "old suggestion" that Yuya was foreign, noting that the only piece of evidence in favour of this was the multiple spellings of his name. No trace of a foreign origin was found in the furniture from the tomb either, all being typically Egyptian.

Taking into account his unusual name and features, some Egyptologists believe that Yuya was of foreign origin (usually Syrian), although this is far from certain. The name Yuya may be spelled in a number of different ways, as Gaston Maspero noted in Theodore Davis's 1907 book—The Tomb of Iouiya and Touiyou. These include "iAy", "ywiA", yw [reed-leaf with walking feet] A, ywiw" and, in orthography—normally a sign of something foreign—"y [man with hand to mouth] iA".

The Biographical Dictionary of Ancient Egypt gives credence to the foreign origin hypothesis: "It is conceivable that he had some Mitannian ancestry, since it is known that knowledge of horses and chariotry was introduced into Egypt from the northern lands and Yuya was the king's 'Master of the Horse'." It also discusses the possibility that Yuya was the brother of queen Mutemwiya, who was the mother of Pharaoh Amenhotep III and may have had Mitannian royal origins. However, this hypothesis can not be substantiated, since nothing is known of Mutemwiya's background. While Yuya lived in Upper Egypt, an area that was predominantly native Egyptian, he could have been an assimilated descendant of Asiatic immigrants or slaves who rose to become a member of the local nobility at Akhmim. On the other hand, if he was not a foreigner, then Yuya would have been the native Egyptian whose daughter was married to Amenhotep III.

Recent studies show that Amenhotep III and his father-in-law Yuya share one third of their genetic genes, suggesting that Yuya was likely Amenhotep III's uncle. However, the possibility that Yuya was a brother of Thutmose IV is almost inconceivable, making it more likely instead that that Yuya was the brother of Mutemwiya. Yuya is believed to have died in his mid 50s around 1374 BC.

== Career ==
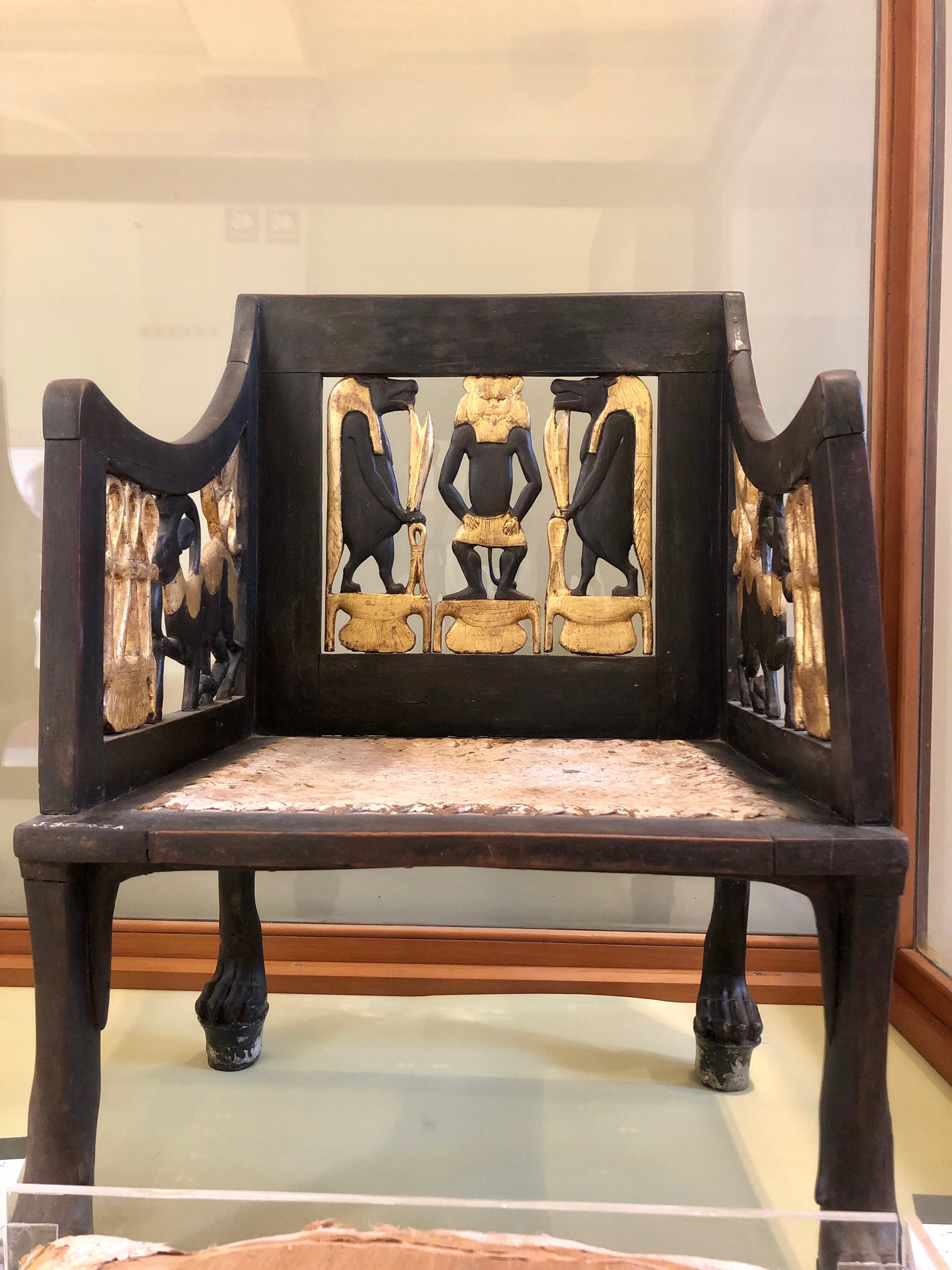
A Gilded 'ibex' chair from the tomb of Yuya and Thuya

Yuya served as a key adviser for Amenhotep III, and held posts such as "King’s Lieutenant" and "Master of the Horse"; his title "Father-of-the-god" possibly referred specifically to his being Amenhotep III's father-in-law. In his native town of Akhmim, Yuya was a prophet of Min, the chief god of the area, and served as this deity's "Superintendent of Cattle".

== Tomb ==
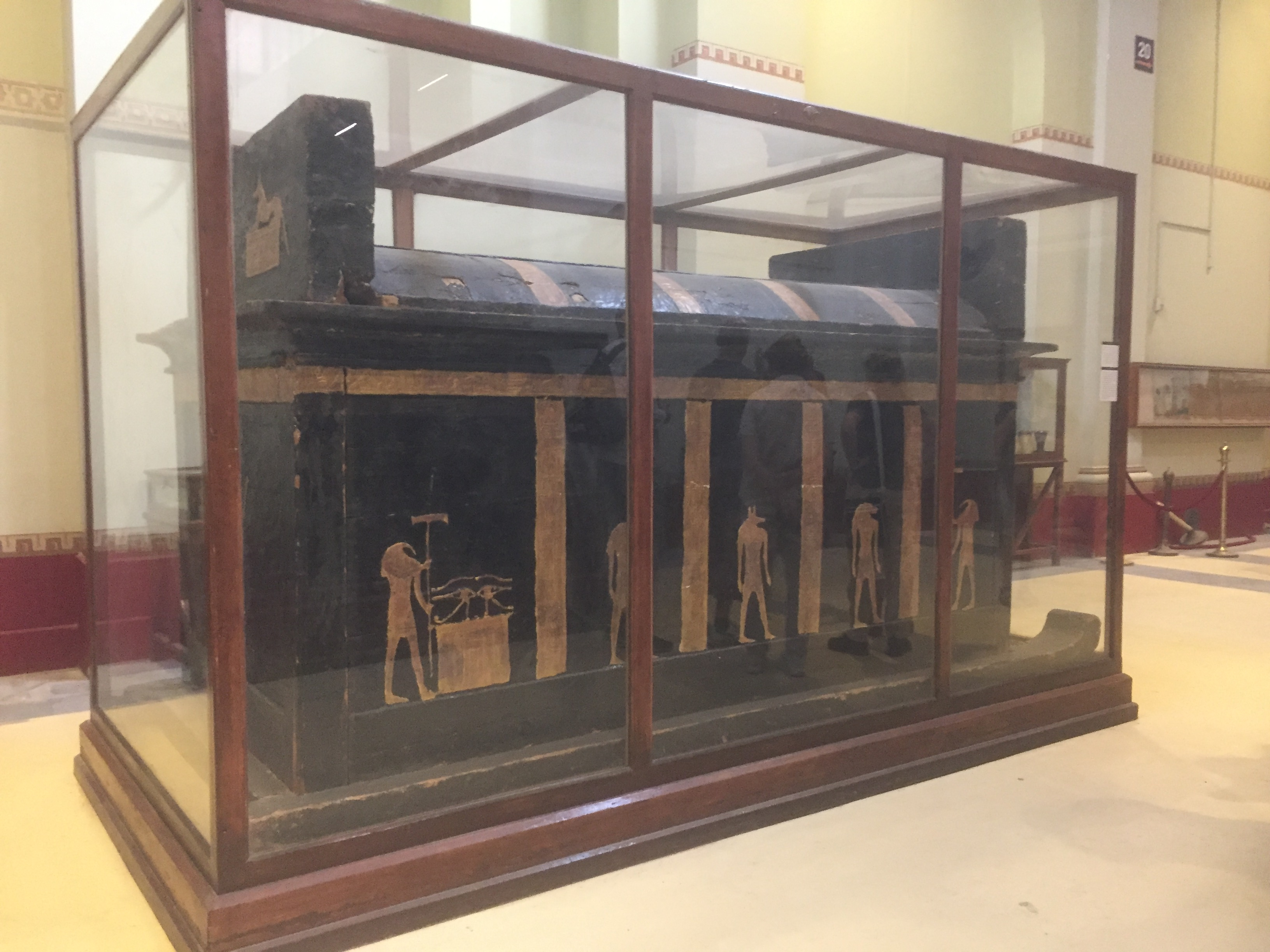
Yuya's sarcophagus from the Egyptian Museum

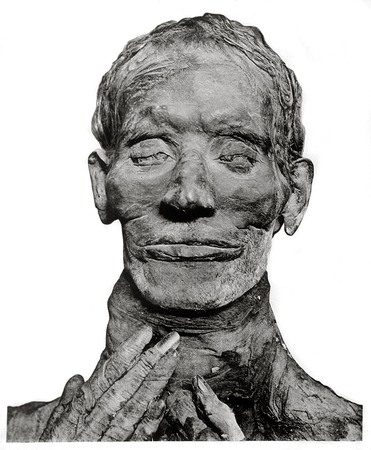
The mummy of Yuya

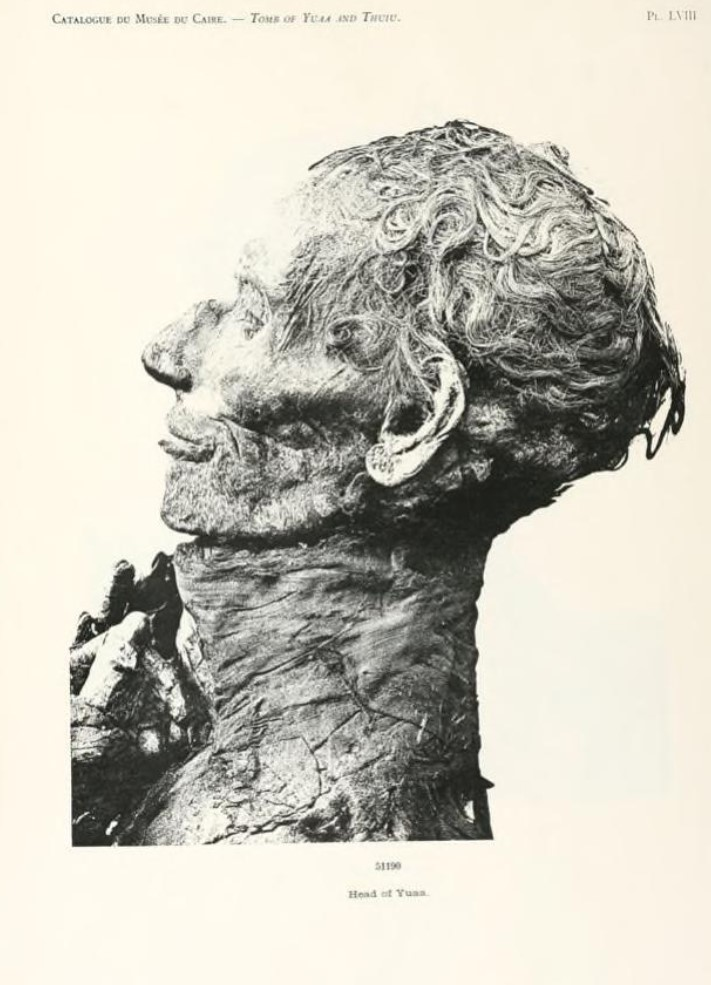
"This is perhaps the most perfect example of the embalmer's art at the time of its zenith in Ancient Egypt."

Yuya and his wife were buried in the Valley of the Kings at Thebes, where their private tomb, now numbered KV46, was discovered in 1905 by James Quibell, who was working on behalf of Theodore Davis. Although the tomb had been penetrated by tomb-robbers, perhaps they were disturbed as Quibell found most of the funerary goods and the two mummies virtually intact. As the Egyptologist Cyril Aldred noted:

Though the tomb had been rifled in antiquity, the [tomb's] opulent funerary furniture was largely intact, and there was no doubt as to the identity of the pair, who were found resting among their torn linen wrappings, within their nests of coffins.

The tomb and the burials it contained were the most complete found in the Valley prior to the discovery of the Tomb of Tutankhamun.

Yuya was interred within a rectangular wooden sarcophagus placed against the north wall; its lid was shaped like the vaulted per-nu shrine of Lower Egypt. Though appearing to sit on sledge runners, it had no base so the three nested gilded (and silvered) anthropoid coffins sat flat on the floor. The long south side of the sarcophagus had been broken in by ancient robbers, who had also moved the short eastern side and left the lid askew, balancing precariously. The lids of each of the nested coffins had been removed with two placed atop each other supported by a chair, and one tipped on its side next to the sarcophagus; the troughs were left in place. His gilt cartonnage mask was still in place, although it was broken.

=== Mummy ===
Yuya's mummy was first examined by the Australian anatomist Grafton Smith. He found the body of Yuya is that of an old man, 1.651 metres (5.42 ft) tall, with white wavy hair discoloured by the embalming process; his eyebrows and eyelashes were dark brown. His ears are unpierced. The arms are bent with his hands placed under his chin. The left hand is fisted, while the fingers of the right are extended. A gold finger stall was found on the little finger of the right hand. There were linen embalming packs placed in front of the eyes, and the body cavity was stuffed with resin-treated linen packs. Smith guessed his age at death to be 60 based on outward appearance alone. Modern CT scanning has estimated his age at death to be 50–60 years, based on the level of joint degeneration and tooth wear. The scanning also revealed two separate levels of resin inside the skull. Packing had been inserted into his mouth, as well as under the skin of his neck to produce a life-like appearance. His cause of death could not be identified. Maspero judged that, based on the position of the sarcophagi, Yuya was the first to die and be interred in the tomb. However, the large eyes and small nose and mouth seen on his funerary mask suggests it was made during the last decade of the reign of Amenhotep III, meaning he may have outlived Thuya. His mummy has the inventory number CG 51190.
