= Thuya =

Ancient Egyptian noblewoman of the Eighteenth Dynasty

V13 w i w
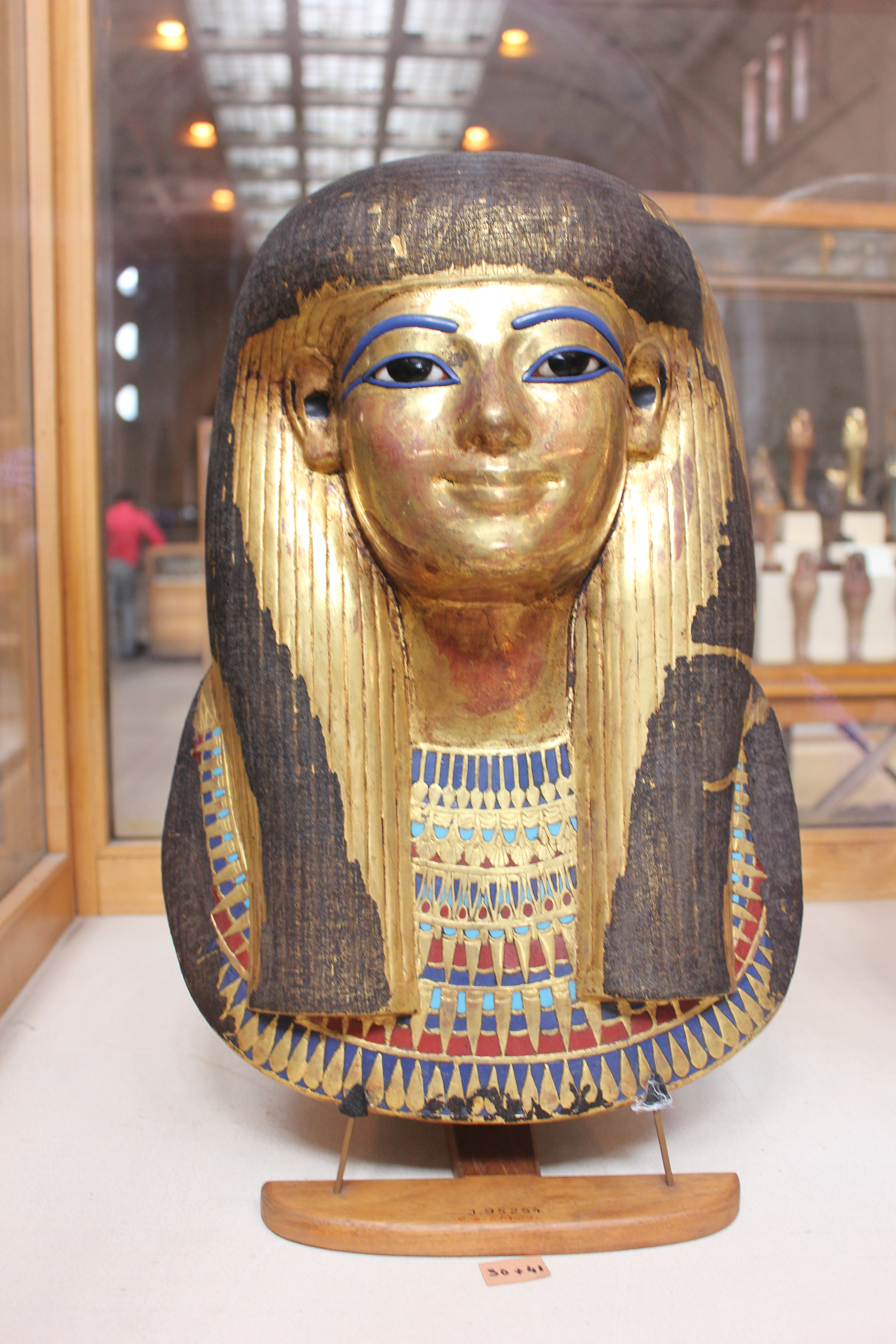
- Mummy mask of Thuya, now in the Cairo Museum
- Born: c. 1430 BC
- Died: c. 1375 BC (aged c. 55)
- Resting place: KV46
- Spouse: Yuya
- Children: Tiye and Anen

Thuya (sometimes transliterated as Touiyou, Thuiu, Tuya, Tjuyu or Thuyu; c. 1430 BC - c. 1375 BC) was an Egyptian noblewoman and the mother of queen Tiye, and the wife of Yuya. She is the grandmother of Akhenaten, and great grandmother of Tutankhamun.

== Origins ==
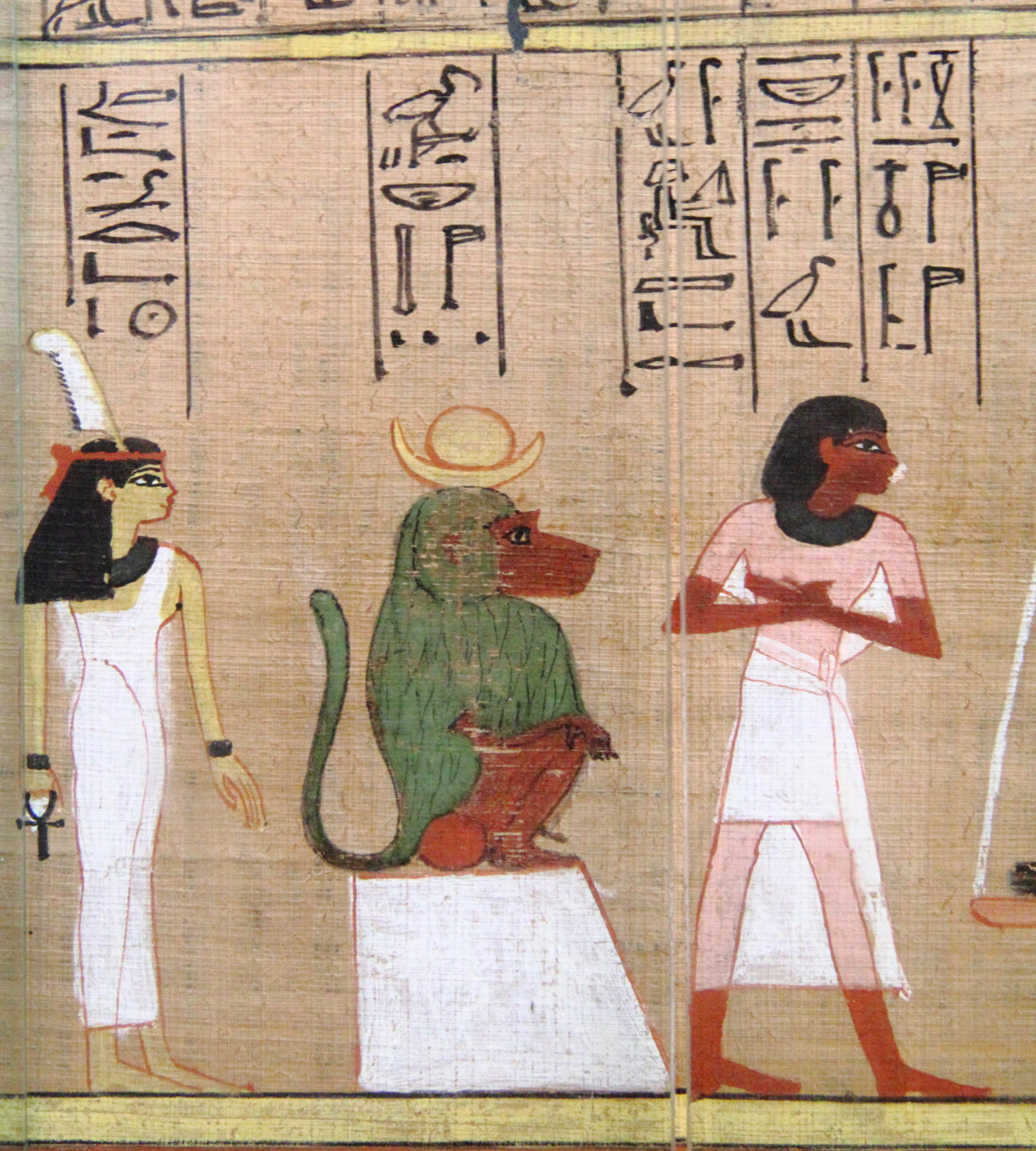
Depiction of Thuya (left) in Yuya's copy of the Book of the Dead

Thuya is believed to be a descendant of Queen Ahmose-Nefertari, and she held many official roles in the interwoven religion and government of ancient Egypt. She was involved in many religious cults; her titles included 'Singer of Hathor' and 'Chief of the Entertainers' of both Amun and Min. She also held the influential offices of Superintendent of the Harem of the god Min of Akhmin and of Amun of Thebes. She married Yuya, a powerful ancient Egyptian courtier of the 18th Dynasty. She is believed to have died around 1375 BC in her 50s.

== Children ==
Yuya and Thuya had a daughter named Tiye, who became the Great Royal Wife of Pharaoh Amenhotep III. The great royal wife was the highest Egyptian religious position, serving alongside of the pharaoh in official ceremonies and rituals.

Yuya and Thuya also had a son named Anen, who carried the titles Chancellor of Lower Egypt, Second Prophet of Amun, sm-priest of Heliopolis and Divine Father.

They also may have been the parents of Ay, an Egyptian courtier active during the reign of pharaoh Akhenaten who became pharaoh after the death of Tutankhamun. However, there is no conclusive evidence regarding the kinship of Yuya and Ay, although certainly, both men came from Akhmim.

== Tomb ==
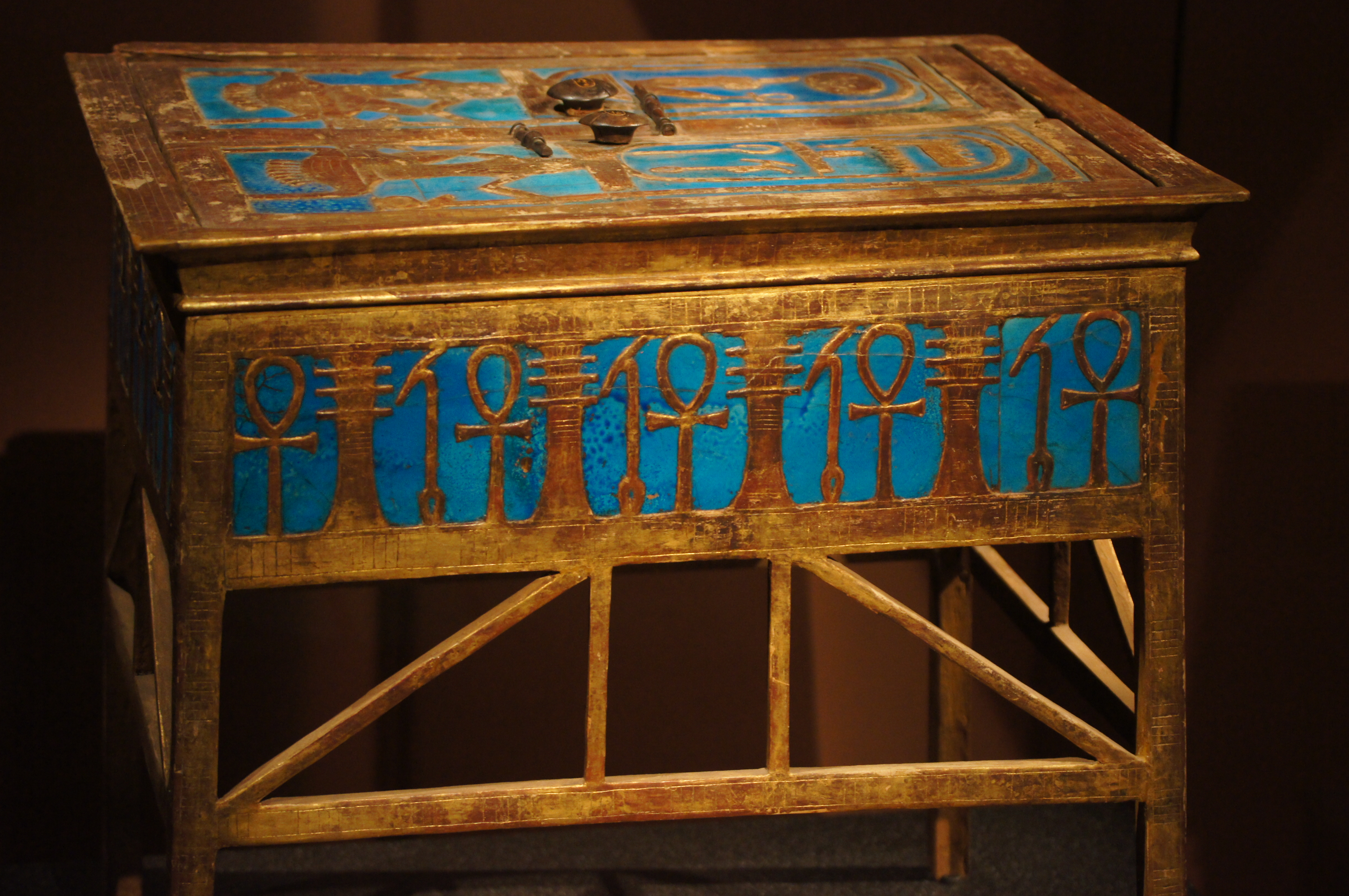
A jewellry box from Yuya and Thuya's tomb

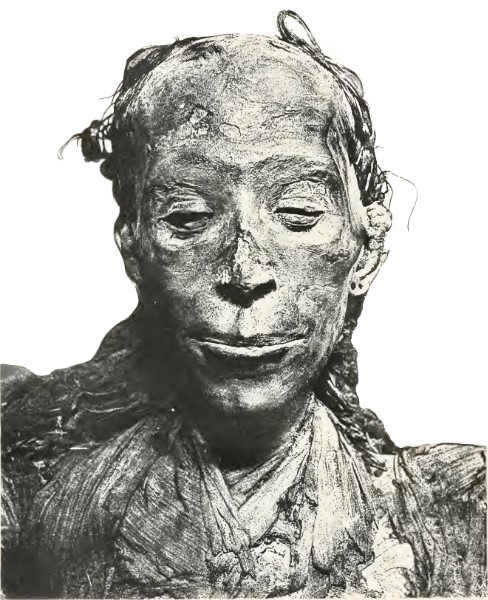
The mummy of Thuya

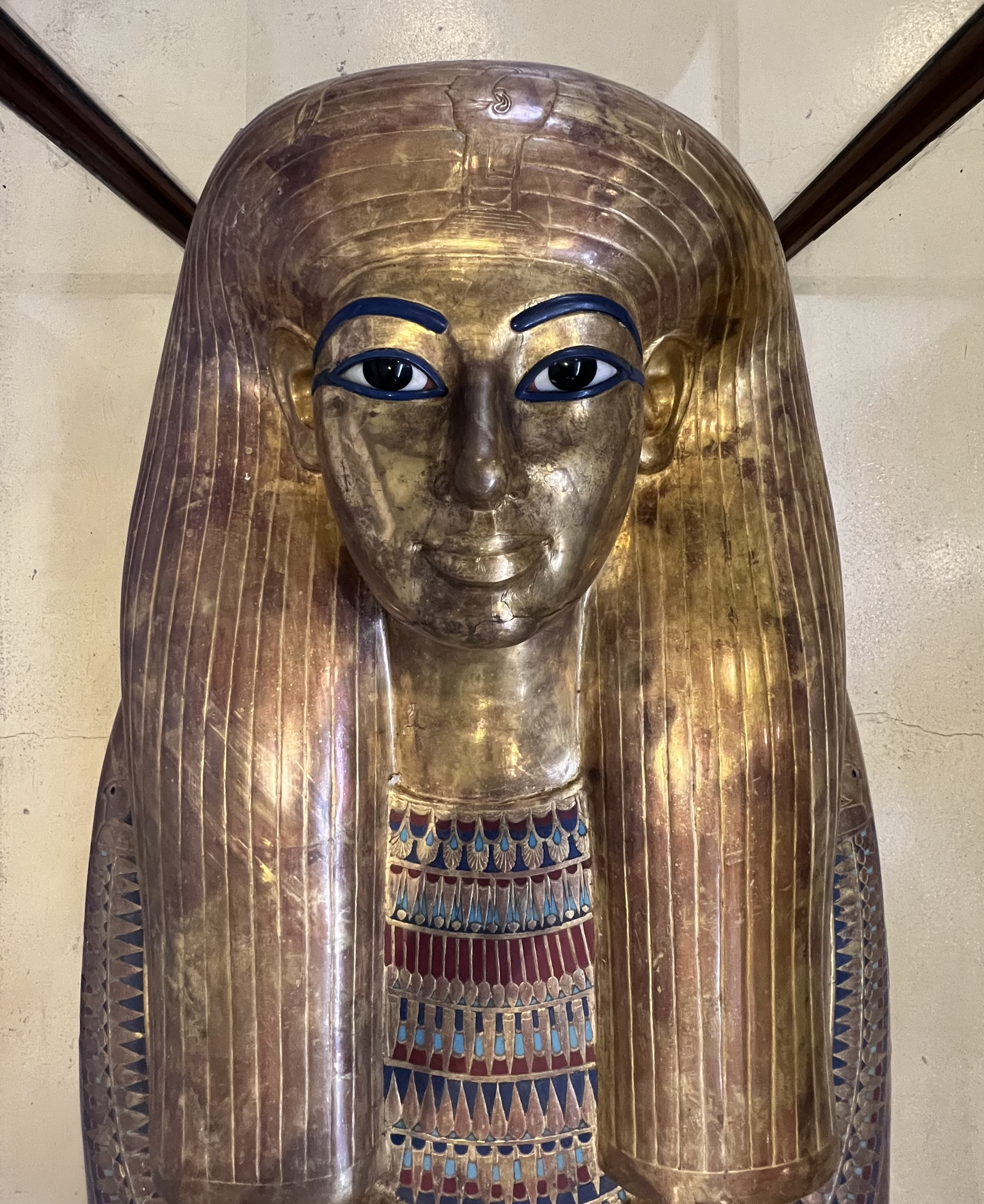
The Second Coffin of Thuya in the Egyptian Museum

Thuya was interred in tomb KV46 in the Valley of the Kings, together with her husband Yuya, where their largely intact burial was found on 5 February 1905. It was the best-preserved tomb discovered in the Valley before that of Tutankhamun, Thuya's great-grandson. The tomb was discovered by a team of workmen led by archaeologist James Quibell on behalf of the American millionaire Theodore Davis. Though the tomb had been robbed in antiquity--and all the jewels in the jewellry boxes being stolen--much of its contents were still present, including beds, boxes, chests, a chariot, and the sarcophagi, coffins, and mummies of the two occupants.

Thuya's large gilded and black-painted wooden sarcophagus was placed against the south wall of the tomb. It is rectangular, with a lid shaped like the sloping roof of the per-wer shrine of Upper Egypt, and sits on ornamental sledge runners, their non-functionality underscored by the three battens attached below them. Ancient robbers had partially dismantled it to access her coffins and mummy, placing its lid and one long side on a bed on the other side of the tomb; the other long side had been leaned against the south wall. Her outer gilded anthropoid coffin had been removed, its lid placed atop the beds, and the trough put into the far corner of the tomb; the lid of her second (innermost) coffin, also gilded, had been removed and placed to one side although the trough and her mummy remained inside the sarcophagus. Quibell suggests this is due to the robbers having some difficulty in removing the lid of this coffin.

=== Mummy ===
Thuya's mummified body was found covered with a large sheet of linen, knotted at the back and secured by four bandages. These bands were covered with resin and opposite each band were her gilded titles cut from gold foil. The resin coating on the lower layers of bandages preserved the impression of a large broad collar. The mummy bands that had once covered her wrapped mummy were recovered above the storage jars on the far side of the room.

The first examination of her body was conducted by Australian anatomist Grafton Smith. He found her to be an elderly woman of small stature, 1.495 metres (4.90 ft) in height, with white hair. Both of her earlobes had two piercings. Her arms are straight at her sides with her hands against the outside of her thighs. Her embalming incision is stitched with thread, to which a carnelian barrel bead is attached at the lower end; her body cavity is stuffed with resin-soaked linen. When Douglas Derry, (who later conducted the first examination of Tutankhamun's mummy) assisting Smith in his examination, exposed Thuya's feet to get an accurate measurement of her height, he found her to be wearing gold foil sandals. Smith estimated her age at more than 50 years based on her outward appearance alone. CT scanning has estimated her age at death to be 50–60 years old. Her brain was removed, though no embalming material was inserted, and both nostrils were stuffed with linen. Embalming packs had been placed into her eye sockets, and subcutaneous filling had been placed into her mid and lower face to restore a lifelike appearance; embalming material had also been placed into her mouth and throat. Her teeth were in poor condition at the time of her death, with missing molars. Heavy wear and abscesses had been noted in earlier x-rays. The scan revealed that she had mild scoliosis with a Cobb angle of 25 degrees. No cause of death could be determined. Her mummy has the inventory number CG 51191.

== Archaeological items pertaining to Thuya ==
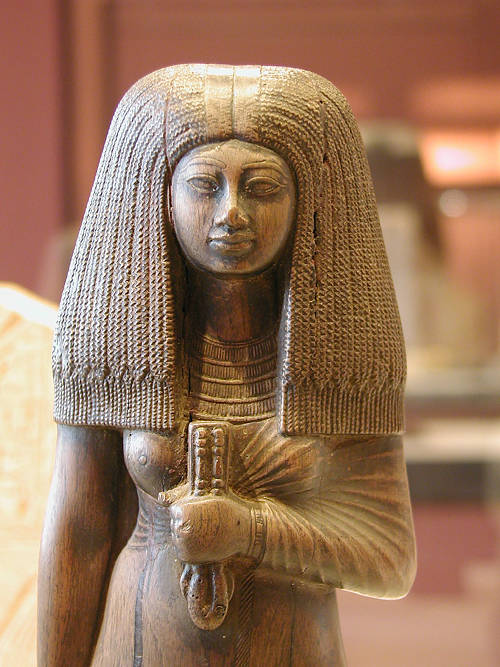
Statue of Thuya, now in the Louvre

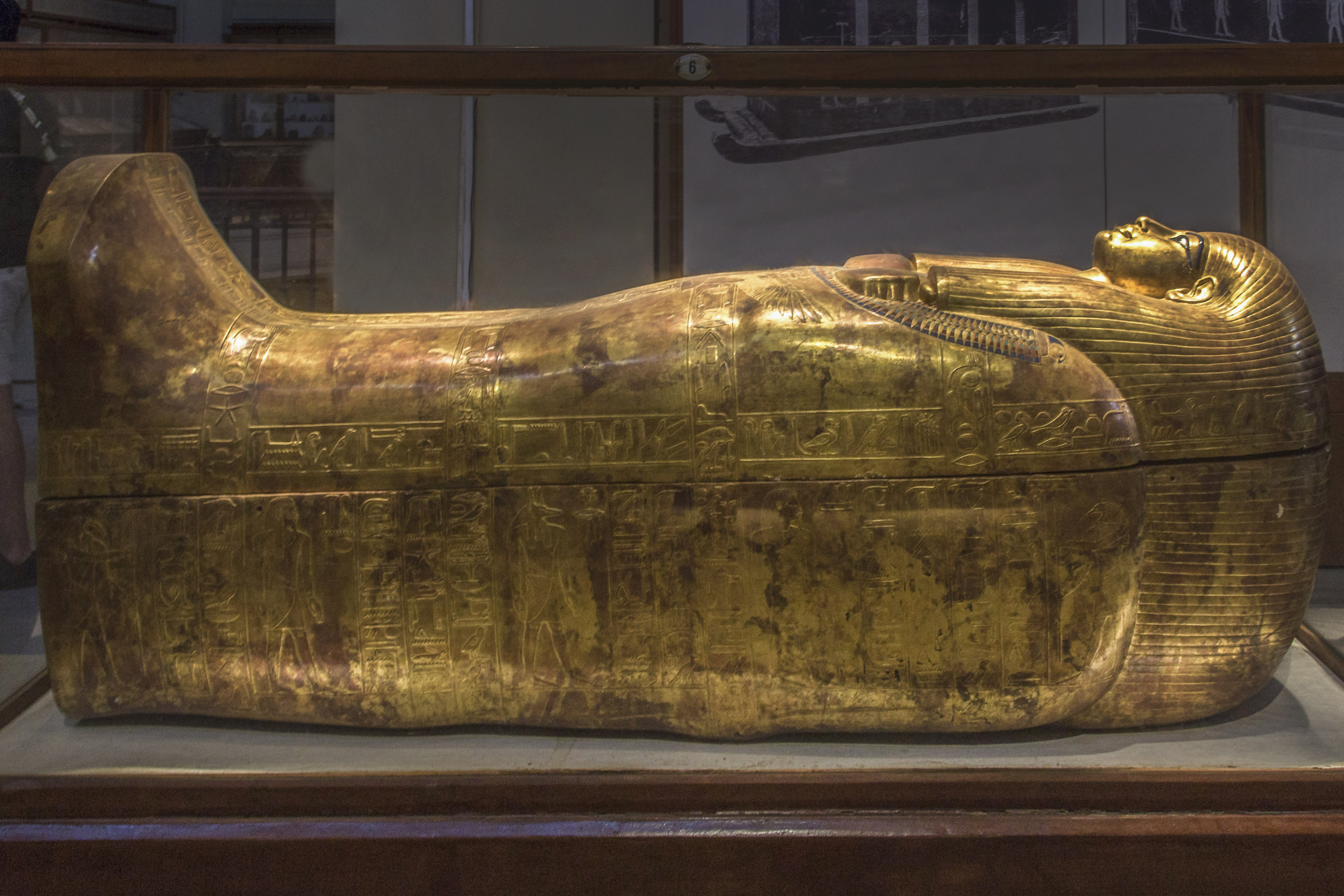
The large outer coffin of Thuya in the Egyptian Museum
