= Online Egyptological Bibliography =

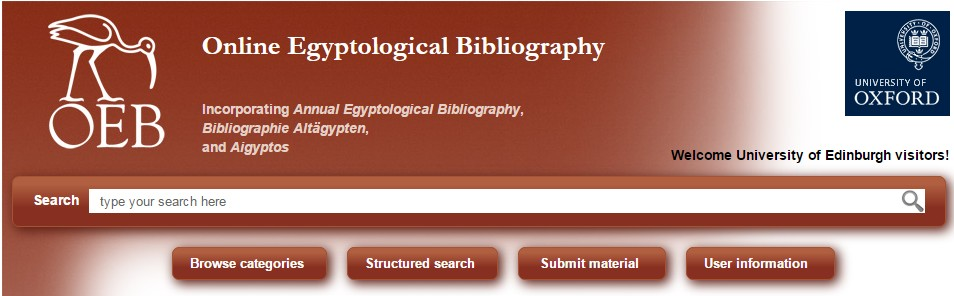
- Screenshot (header)
- Producer: Griffith Institute (United Kingdom)
- History: 1947 to present

Access
- Cost: Subscription

Coverage
- Disciplines: Egyptology

Print edition
- Print title: Annual Egyptological Bibliography
- ISSN: 1872-7867

Links
- Website: oeb.griffith.ox.ac.uk

The Online Egyptological Bibliography (OEB) is an online database of printed publications in the field of Egyptology, published by the Griffith Institute, Oxford. The OEB is the successor of the Annual Egyptological Bibliography (AEB), which appeared in print until 2001.

== Annual Egyptological Bibliography ==
One of the initial goals of the International Association of Egyptologists (IAE) at its foundation in 1947 was to produce overviews of literature relevant to Egyptology, to aid Egyptological research. Jozef M.A. Janssen, a Dutch Egyptologist at Leiden University, was asked to publish a yearly list of titles with abstracts. The first volume appeared in 1948. Volumes 1 (1947)-30 (1976) were published by Brill, volumes 31 (1977)-35 (1981) by Aris & Phillips Ltd.

After Janssen’s death in 1963, Dutch Egyptologist M.S.G.H. Heerma van Voss assumed the task of AEB Editor-in-Chief, with the help of a number of assistant editors. He was succeeded by Jac. J. Janssen (1967–1978), L.M.J. Zonhoven (1979–1984), and W. Hovestreydt (1984–2008).

In the 1980s, yearly volumes of Preliminary Egyptological Bibliography were also published. Due to budget cuts at Leiden University, The Netherlands Institute for the Near East (NINO) took responsibility for the AEB in 1992. Volumes 36 (1982)-53 (2001) were published by NINO. Hovestreydt together with H.S. van den Berg developed a digital administration of the bibliographical information, which led to the publication in 2001 of the CD-ROM Egyptological bibliography 1822–1997 (which included the digitized information of C. Beinlich's Bibliographie Altägypten 1822–1947), and the AEB Online website in 2007.

== Move to Oxford ==
Starting from 2009, the AEB was transferred to Oxford and renamed to the Online Egyptological Bibliography. No more print volumes were published. In 2011, the German bibliography Aigyptos was incorporated.
