= TT71 =

Theban Tomb

Theban tomb TT71
- Burial site of Senenmut
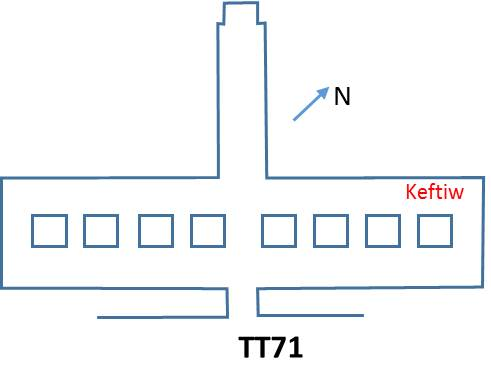
- Floor plan of TT71

- Location within Egypt
- Coordinates: 25°44′00″N 32°36′29″E
- Location: Sheikh Abd el-Qurna, Theban Necropolis
- ← Previous; TT70 Next → TT72

T23 n mwt
Senenmut
in hieroglyphs
Era: New Kingdom
(1550–1069 BC)

Theban Tomb TT71 is located in the Theban Necropolis, on the west bank of the Nile, opposite to Luxor. It was the tomb chapel of Senenmut, who was the steward and architect of Hatshepsut. The chapel is located in the necropolis area around Sheikh Abd el-Qurna. Previously (for about 100 years) the tomb was accessible and for most of this time the target of numerous investigations and intrusions, although early on already heavily destroyed. The tomb was visited already early. In the first half of the nineteenth century, John Gardner Wilkinson, Robert Hay and J. Wild copied scenes, although the decoration was already badly destroyed. Richard Lepsius (1842–45) took the false door to Berlin and copied some inscribed bricks. Only in 1906 Kurt Sethe copied all inscriptions. In 1930–31 Herbert Winlock cleared the whole tomb. Winlock found the fragments of a smashed sarcophagus.

Today the tomb chapel's decoration is almost totally gone. With its dimensions it is one of the biggest Theban chapels of the 18th Dynasty. The facade is about 30 meter wide. In the middle there is the entrance and on either side there are four niches with windows. The inner of the chapel has an (upside-down) T-shaped plan. The transverse hall is about 26 m long and supported by eight columns. At the back there are several small niches. In the hall appears the oldest depictions of Minoans in Egypt so far known. There are also remains of soldiers under a Hathor frieze and a biographical inscription. After the transverse hall follows a long passage with a niche at the end. Only few remains of the decoration survived, such as an offering list and a banquet scene, where Senenmut is once shown with his mother and once with his father. A special feature only known from this tomb are several rock cut stelae providing the name and titles of Senenmut.

Above the chapel, cut into the rocks, there is a block statue of Senenmut.

It has always been a matter of confusion that Senenmut had two tombs. However, in the 18th Dynasty several high officials had one decorated tomb chapel and a second tomb with an underground burial chamber often not even close to the chapel. In some cases it can be assumed that they even had an undecorated burial chamber in the Valley of the Kings, while a decorated chapel closer to the fertile land. The burial chamber of Senenmut was found at Deir el-Bahri TT353 and is sometimes called Senenmut's 'secret tomb', as it has no chapel, which was in fact TT71. TT71 functioned most likely also as chapel for Senenmut's parents, who were buried close by and are depicted in the chapel.

== Gallery ==
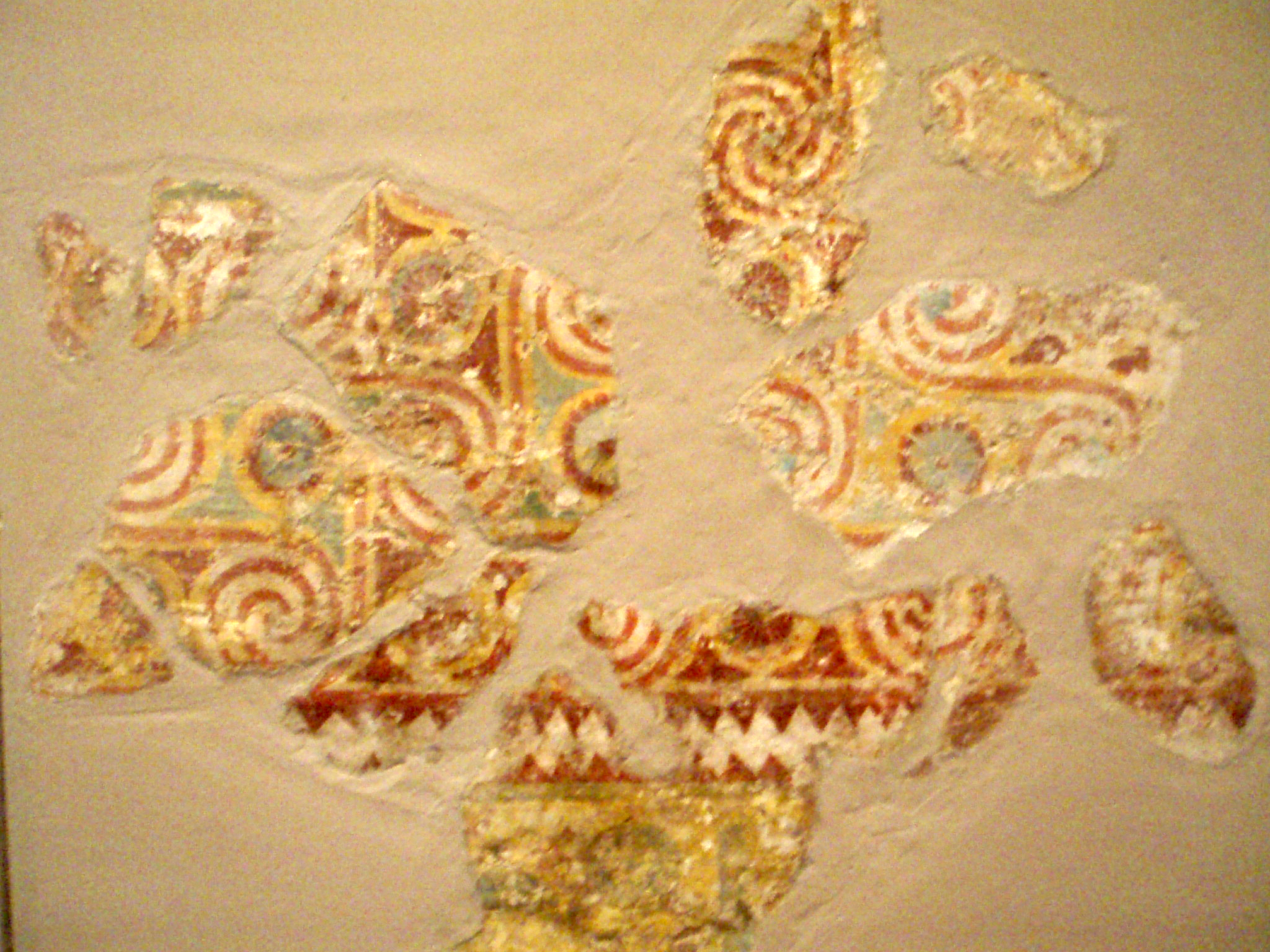
Painting from the ceiling from TT71 Metropolitan Museum of Art.

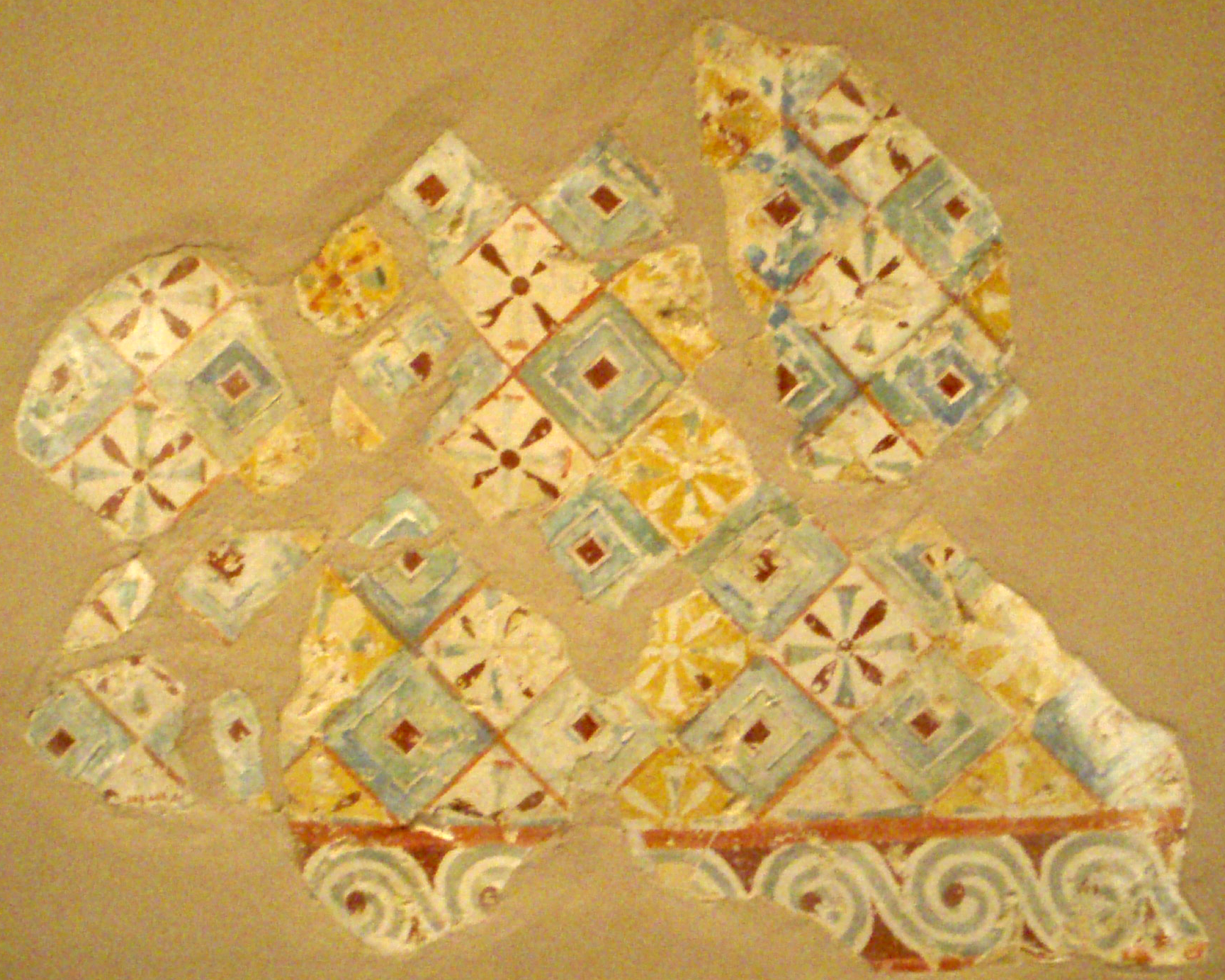
Diamond shaped pattern from the ceiling from TT71 Metropolitan Museum of Art.

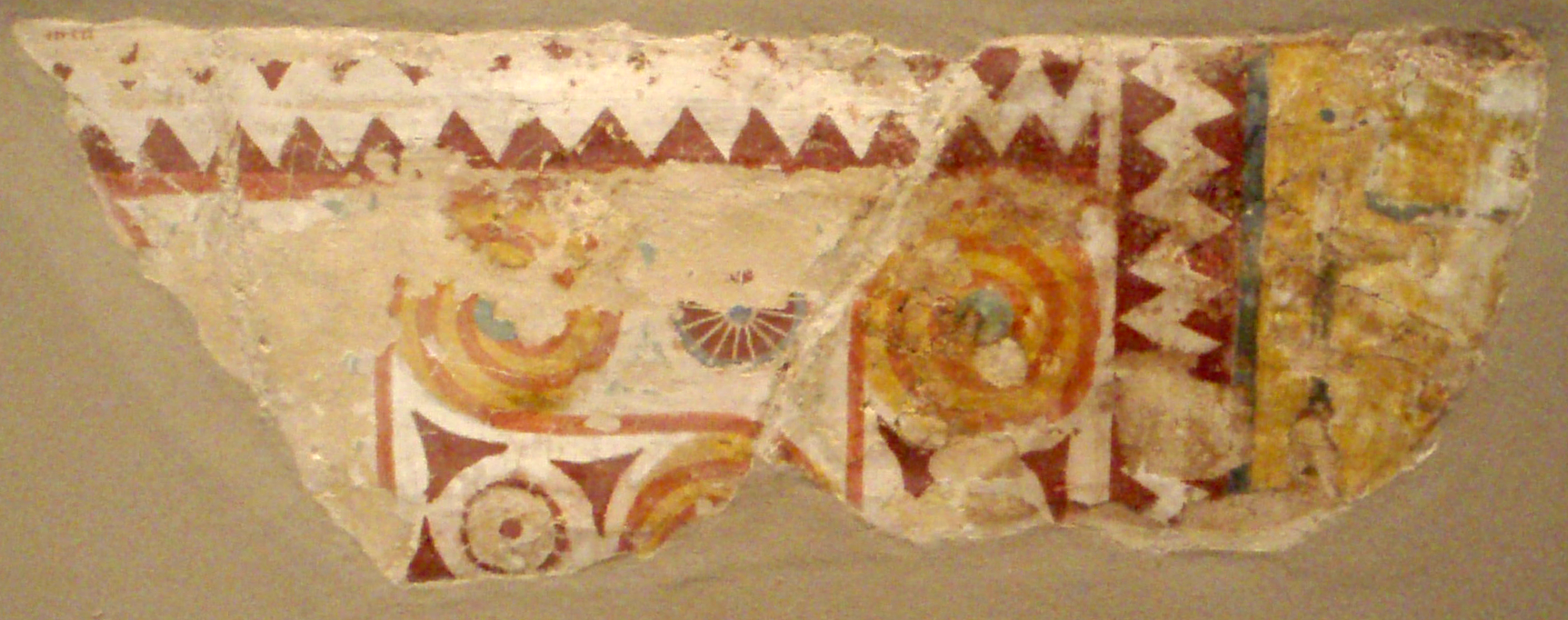
Painting from the ceiling of the tomb, now in the Metropolitan Museum of Art.

== See also ==
- List of Theban tombs
