= Griffith Institute =

Egyptological institute at the University of Oxford

The Griffith Institute is an Egyptological institution based in the Griffith Wing of the Bodleian Art, Archaeology and Ancient World Library and is part of the Faculty of Asian and Middle Eastern Studies, University of Oxford, England. It was founded for the advancement of Egyptology and Ancient Near Eastern Studies by the first Professor of Egyptology at the University of Oxford, Francis Llewellyn Griffith. Griffith bequeathed funds in his will (augmented by the personal fortune of his wife Nora Griffith) for the foundation of the Institute and it opened on 21 January 1939, with its own independent committee of management. Rosalind Moss operated the Griffith Institute from its opening until the mid-1960s.

== Overview ==
The Griffith Institute Archive contains a collection of Egyptological research materials based on the original manuscripts and excavation records of Francis Llewellyn Griffith. The collection includes early copies of inscriptions, drawings, watercolours, photographic negatives, photographs, squeezes, and rubbings.

Among some seventy major groups of material the Institute holds the papers of Sir Alan H. Gardiner, Battiscombe Gunn and Jaroslav Černý, records made by Howard Carter during his discovery of the tomb of Tutankhamun in 1922, as well as the documentation from the Nubian expeditions of Griffith and Sir Henry Wellcome.

The Institute edits and publishes two major research projects, the Topographical Bibliography of Ancient Egyptian Hieroglyphic Texts, Reliefs and Paintings, and the Online Egyptological Bibliography (OEB). It is also responsible for a number of important publications within the field of Egyptology, the best-known being Gardiner's Egyptian Grammar and Faulkner's A Concise Dictionary of Middle Egyptian.

Finally, the Griffith Institute administers the A.H. Gardiner Travel Scholarship in Egyptology, the aim of which is to promote friendship and cooperation between Egyptologists from the United Kingdom and the Arab Republic of Egypt.

An exhibition at the Ashmolean Museum in Oxford, Discovering Tutankhamun, open from July until November 2014, explored Howard Carter’s excavation of the tomb of Tutankhamun in 1922. Original records, drawings and photographs from the Griffith Institute were on display. The complete records of the ten-year excavation of the tomb of Tutankhamun were deposited in the Griffith Institute Archive at the University of Oxford shortly after Carter's death.
