= Glossary of ancient Egypt artifacts =

This is a glossary of ancient Egypt artifacts.

== Glossary of ancient Egyptian artifacts and materials ==
- Amulet – an amulet is an object that is typically worn on one's person, that some people believe has the magical or miraculous power to protect its holder.
- Ankh – a symbol of life held by Ra
- Benben stone (also known as a pyramidion) – the top stone of the Egyptian pyramid
- Canopic jar – vessel containing internal body organs removed during mummification
- Canopic chest – the common chest contained the four Canopic jars
- Cartonnage – papyrus or linen soaked in plaster, shaped around a body and used for mummy masks and coffins
- Coffin (Ancient Egyptian) – funerary box to contain the corpse or mummy of a deceased person or animal for burial or entombment
- Cenotaph – an empty tomb or a monument erected in honor of a person or group of people whose remains are elsewhere
- Crook – a symbol of pharaonic power. Symbol of the god Osiris
- Faience – glasswork articles, amulets, etc.
- False door – an artistic representation of a door, a common architectural element in the tombs
- Flail – a symbol of pharaonic power. Symbol of the god Osiris
- Flint knife – prestige funerary good, from the Naqada period until the end of the Early Dynastic Period
- Funerary cone – small cones made from clay that were placed over the entrance of the chapel of a tomb, used almost exclusively in the Theban necropolis (Mesopotamia had clay nails)
- Headrest – found in tombs, etc. Typically personal, or a memorial headrest
- Imiut fetish – a religious object used in funerary rites; a stuffed, headless animal skin, often of a feline or bull, tied by the tail to a pole, terminating in a lotus bud and inserted into a stand
- Microlith – ancient Egyptian stone flakes
- Menat – an amulet worn around the neck. Also a musical instrument, a metal rattle (see also: sistrum)
- Menhed – a scribe's pallet
- Mummy – body after mummification
- Naos – religious shrine; portable shrine for carrying a god
- Ostracon – pottery sherd, limestone Sherd, used as writing material
- Cosmetic palette – slab of stone, sometimes decorated, used for preparing cosmetics. See: Narmer Palette; and: Category:Archaeological palettes.
- Papyrus – a material made from papyrus reeds, used as writing and painting material
- Pectoral (Ancient Egypt) – many forms. (Up to 13 additional Gardiner-unlisted determinative hieroglyphs for the "pectoral"; See Gardiner's sign list.)
- Rosetta Stone – A stone with three languages on it, which unlocked the Egyptian language
- Saqqara Bird – wooden bird model
- Sarcophagus – a funeral receptacle for a corpse, most commonly carved in stone
- Scarab – amulet or seal in the form of an abstract dung beetle
- Senet – a board game
- Shabti – figurines placed in the tomb as substitutes for the tomb owner in the next world
- Sphinx
- Pyramid – a monumental structure with a square or triangular base and sloping sides that meet in a point at the top, especially one built of stone as a royal tomb in ancient Egypt
  - Statuary – pharaonic and non-pharaonic. (Range of sizes.)
  - Amulets – numerous, (and predynastic).
- Stele
  - Boundary Stele – placed at boundaries.
  - Memorial Stele – pharaonic or non-pharaonic.
  - Monumental Stele – offered to gods, special individuals.
  - Votive Stele – private, dedication.
  - Victory Stele – pharaonic.
- Talatat – limestone wall blocks, at times painted.
- Ushabti – shabtis from the 21st Dynasty and later.

== See also ==
- Grave goods
- Votive deposit
