= Academy of Science, St. Louis =

Scientific society in St. Louis

- Formation: March 10, 1856; 170 years ago
- Founded at: St. Louis, Missouri, U.S.
- Type: Learned society; 501(c)(3) non-profit
- Headquarters: 5050 Oakland Avenue, St. Louis, Missouri
- Region served: Greater St. Louis
- President: Toni M. Kutchan
- Executive Director: Kate Polokonis
- Main organ: Board of trustees
- Website: academyofsciencestl.org

The Academy of Science, St. Louis (also rendered Academy of Science – St. Louis and historically the Academy of Science of St. Louis) is a learned society and non-profit organization in St. Louis, Missouri, devoted to the advancement and public understanding of science. It was founded on March 10, 1856 by fifteen men, twelve of them physicians, together with the engineer James B. Eads, the lawyer Nathaniel Holmes and the fur trader Charles P. Chouteau. A charter incorporating the Academy was approved by the Missouri General Assembly on January 17, 1857.

For its first century the Academy maintained a natural history museum and a research library and published Transactions of the Academy of Science of St. Louis, a journal that by 1904 was exchanged with 584 scientific institutions around the world. Its members included the botanist George Engelmann, who was president sixteen times and whose friendship with Henry Shaw helped shape the Missouri Botanical Garden, and the zoologist Charles Henry Turner, who published in the Transactions and was commemorated in a memorial issue of it after his death in 1923.

The Academy operated a succession of public museums, the last being the Museum of Science and Natural History in Oak Knoll Park in Clayton, Missouri, which opened in 1959. Voters placed that museum in a new regional tax district in 1971, and the Academy transferred it and its collections to a public board of commissioners; the collections passed in turn to the Saint Louis Science Center, whose Forest Park building opened on November 2, 1991. The Academy continued as an independent organization and now runs the St. Louis Science Fair, the Junior Academy of Science, a public speaker series and the annual Outstanding St. Louis Scientists Awards.

== History ==
=== Predecessor society ===
In late 1836, a group meeting in St. Louis organized the Western Academy of Natural Sciences, which obtained a charter from the Missouri General Assembly dated February 6, 1837; its incorporators included the physician and botanist George Engelmann. Frederick Starr, who called it the Western Academy of Science, described it in 1898 as "perhaps the first society for scientific research established west of the Alleghany Mountains," founded through the efforts of Engelmann and Adolphus Wislizenus. The society bought several acres near Eighth Street and Chouteau Avenue, where Engelmann began a botanical garden and arboretum on a small scale; the venture failed and the land was sold. In 1843, the older society elected John James Audubon to honorary membership on a diploma signed by Engelmann as president. On August 4, 1856, its surviving members donated its library of 120 volumes and its mineralogical and geological collections to the new Academy.

=== Founding and charter ===
The Academy of Science of St. Louis held its first regular meeting on March 10, 1856 in the hall of the city's Board of Public Schools. Fifteen men answered the roll: the physicians George Engelmann, Moses L. Linton, William M. McPheeters, Moses M. Pallen, Simon Pollak, Charles A. Pope, Hiram A. Prout, Benjamin F. Shumard, Charles W. Stevens, William H. Tingley, John H. Watters and Adolphus Wislizenus; the civil engineer James B. Eads; the lawyer Nathaniel Holmes; and the fur trader and traveler Charles P. Chouteau. Engelmann was elected the first president, Prout and Holmes vice-presidents, Shumard and Tingley secretaries, and Eads treasurer.

The original constitution declared that the Academy "shall have for its object the promotion of science: it shall embrace zoology, botany, geology, mineralogy, paleontology, ethnology (especially that of the aboriginal tribes of North America), chemistry, physics, mathematics, meteorology and comparative anatomy and physiology." Fourteen standing committees were created at once, with astronomy and meteorology added in the second year; Starr judged the scheme "sufficiently detailed and heavy to kill a modern society," adding that "the academy was incorporated to last, and it survived." The act of incorporation was approved on January 17, 1857 and accepted by vote of the Academy on February 9. It empowered the Academy to hold property for the advancement of science and the establishment of a museum and library in St. Louis, and provided that on dissolution its collections and library would pass to the City of St. Louis for educational purposes. Membership grew from the original 15 to 104 by the end of 1856 and about 150 by 1860.

=== Civil War, fire and recovery ===
During the American Civil War the Academy received the natural history and anatomical collections of McDowell College when that building was converted into the Gratiot Street Prison. In May 1869, a fire broke out in the St. Louis Medical College building where the Academy met and, in Starr's words, "the whole museum was swept out of existence"; only a few specimens survived, although the library and most of the stock of the Transactions were saved. Henry M. Whelpley, the Academy's historian, wrote that the loss followed closely on the death of the Academy's president, Benjamin F. Shumard, and "struck terror to the strongest hearts." Engelmann told the members afterwards that "some are dead, others have removed from here, and few remain to help the work." Starr called it the darkest hour in the institution's history; no volume of the Transactions had appeared since 1868. The Academy resumed publishing and meeting, moving in turn to the rooms of the school board, to Washington University in 1881 and to the Missouri Historical Society building in 1893.

=== New building and fiftieth anniversary ===
After nearly five decades as a tenant or guest, the Academy entered its own building at 3817 Olive Street in November 1903, the gift of Eliza McMillan and her son William Northrop McMillan, with $5,000 from President Henry W. Eliot to fit it out. William Trelease, then director of the Missouri Botanical Garden and for ten years the Academy's secretary, wrote that "with the opening of the fall, therefore, the academy, for the first time in its existence, meets in its own home."

The Louisiana Purchase Exposition of 1904 brought the Congress of Arts and Science to St. Louis, and the Academy used the occasion to elect seventeen visiting scientists as honorary members "in recognition of their valuable services to science." They included the chemists Svante Arrhenius, J. H. van 't Hoff, William Ramsay, Henri Moissan and Wilhelm Ostwald, the physicist Ludwig Boltzmann, the physicist and chemist Ernest Rutherford, the bacteriologist Shibasaburo Kitasato, the pediatrician Theodor Escherich and the anatomist Wilhelm Waldeyer; all seventeen accepted.

The Academy marked its fiftieth anniversary with an open session on March 5, 1906 and a banquet five days later, and struck a commemorative bronze medal bearing the Academy's seal and a portrait of Engelmann. Among the guests, T. C. Chamberlin of the University of Chicago, speaking of his own city's academy, told the banquet that "the Academy of St. Louis is the senior institution of its class in the interior of this country."

=== Closure, mergers and revival ===
Interest lagged during World War I, and in 1917 the Academy closed its building for lack of funds and placed its library, by then about 50,000 volumes, with the St. Louis Public Library for safekeeping; it was later shelved at the Washington University Library and then at Saint Louis University. Three successor organizations were absorbed over the following decades: the St. Louis Natural History Museum Association turned over its assets in 1922, the St. Louis Museum of Natural History in 1934 and the St. Louis Museum of Science and Industry in 1939. In 1939 the Academy sponsored, with the Works Progress Administration and the Missouri Resources Museum, an archaeological excavation of mounds and village sites in Jefferson County; the finds were divided among the Smithsonian Institution, the Missouri Resources Museum and the Academy.

A building at 4642 Lindell Boulevard, given by Joseph Desloge in 1944, allowed the Academy to open the Museum of Natural History, Science and Industry on March 21, 1945. In 1947 the widow of Henry M. Whelpley gave his collection of Native American artifacts, then valued at about $75,000. In 1950 the Academy replaced its twelve-member council with a twenty-five-member board of directors, and in 1956 a woman was elected to that board for the first time in more than fifty years.

=== Museum of Science and Natural History ===
The Academy sold the Lindell Boulevard building in 1958. That same year it hired Murl Deusing, curator of education at the Milwaukee Public Museum, as director at $12,000 a year (equivalent to $134,000 in 2025), with offices to be in a planned museum in Oak Knoll Park in Clayton. The project was seeded by a $50,000 gift from J. Lionberger Davis, a St. Louis lawyer and banker, and by a $45,000 grant from the trust fund of A. P. Greensfelder, which required the Academy to raise a further $135,000. Academy president Stratford Lee Morton said he hoped to raise $500,000 in all.

In 1959, the Academy opened the Museum of Science and Natural History in two stone mansions in the park, the fourth in its series of public science museums, paying the City of Clayton one dollar a year in rent but carrying the cost of upkeep. Admission was free. Displays included a reconstruction of the burial chamber of the 19th-dynasty official Sennedjem and the mummy of Henut-wedjebu, a woman of the reign of Amenhotep III; a "Transparent Woman" model shown in its own theater from November 1960; and, after 1983, the mounted body of Mzuri, a lowland gorilla from the Saint Louis Zoo. A 1971 federal directory recorded the Academy's study collections as Missouri archaeology, rocks and minerals, mollusks, Missouri herpetology, and antique lamps, lighting equipment and radios, and noted that nearly all of its 90,000 library volumes were by then deposited at Saint Louis University's Pius XII Memorial Library and the Washington University Library. Its archives held roughly two linear feet of meeting minutes and other Academy documents from 1856 to 1941.

=== Zoo-Museum District and the Science Center ===
Within a few years of the museum's opening the Academy was struggling to meet the cost of maintaining the buildings, and the Saint Louis Zoo and the Saint Louis Art Museum faced similar difficulties. Legislation passed in a special session of the Missouri legislature in 1969 authorized voters of the city and county to create the Metropolitan Zoological Park and Museum District. The district was approved in the spring of 1971 and began operating in 1972 with three institutions, one of them the Museum of Science and Natural History. Governance of the museum and ownership of the collections passed to a board of commissioners. The Academy's president that year, Jules Campbell, announced that the Academy would continue as an independent organization, and the commissioners agreed to provide it with office space in any future museum building.

The museum acquired the city's James S. McDonnell Planetarium in 1984 and, after a $3.2 million renovation, reopened there as the Saint Louis Science Center on July 20, 1985; the Clayton museum closed, and its contents were transferred to the new institution. A $34 million building on Oakland Avenue, linked to the planetarium by a bridge over Interstate 64, opened on November 2, 1991. The City of Clayton leased one of the Oak Knoll mansions to the St. Louis Artists' Guild in May 1989, and the other has been in use as a childcare facility since 1990.

According to the Science Center's guidebook, Academy members provided leadership, funding and volunteer support as plans for the Science Center developed, and "the Saint Louis Science Center exists today because of the organization now known as [the] Academy of Science – St. Louis." The Academy's offices are at the Science Center's address on Oakland Avenue.

== Transactions ==
Transactions of the Academy of Science of St. Louis began publication early in 1857 with the charter, constitution and proceedings and papers by Shumard, Prout and others, including the first of a long series of local meteorological records by Engelmann and Wislizenus. Important papers were issued as separately covered brochures as soon as they were read and gathered into volumes with an index once enough had appeared. HathiTrust records 31 volumes covering 1856 to 1958; the Academy, which maintains the run as a digitized archive, describes it as 33 volumes spanning 133 years, and counted 397 scientific treatises published by its centennial in 1956.

The journal was the basis of an exchange network with other scientific societies. Starr reported that more than 180 institutions in the Americas, Asia and Australia had entered into exchange relations within the Academy's first three years and that the list stood at 550 when he wrote in 1898; the Academy put it at 584 in 1904. The Academy of Natural Sciences in Philadelphia placed the St. Louis society on its exchange list before it had anything to offer in return, and during the Civil War the Transactions were distributed through the Smithsonian Institution. After fires destroyed the holdings of the Portland Society of Natural History in Maine and of the Chicago Academy of Sciences, the St. Louis academy sent both societies replacement sets of its Transactions together with minerals and specimens; Chamberlin recalled in 1906 that "the Academy of Chicago remembers with peculiar pleasure and gratitude the sympathy and assistance of this Academy after our great fire." The historian Walter B. Hendrickson, writing in the Academy's own journal, compared it with the Chicago academy, founded in the same year, and concluded that Chicago had more money to operate on but that "St. Louis had a more distinguished publication."

== Notable members ==
George Engelmann served as president sixteen times and published his botanical work, on cacti, oaks, yuccas, junipers, conifers and other groups, in the Transactions in preference to other journals, although he was a practicing physician rather than a professional botanist. His friendship with Henry Shaw shaped the creation of the Missouri Botanical Garden, whose associated school of botany at Washington University holds a professorship named for him.

Hiram A. Prout, the Academy's first vice-president and later its president, had in 1847 described in the American Journal of Science a large fossil jaw from the White River badlands that he took for a Palaeotherium; the animal was later named Titanotherium prouti for him, and the type specimen was among the Academy's museum holdings. James B. Eads, the Academy's first treasurer and later its president, built the Eads Bridge across the Mississippi River and the jetties that opened its mouth to ocean shipping. Nathaniel Holmes, afterwards Royal Professor of Law at Harvard University, served many years as corresponding secretary; Trelease credited him with placing the Academy on the mailing lists of foreign bodies at a time when it had nothing to offer in exchange. Other members included the state geologist George C. Swallow; the entomologist Charles V. Riley, later chief of the Department of Agriculture's Division of Entomology; the physicist Francis E. Nipher, who organized the Missouri State Weather Service; and Trelease himself.

Charles Henry Turner, a Black entomologist who taught at Sumner High School, was elected to membership on April 18, 1910 and published his work on the Cladocera and Copepoda in the Transactions that year and again in 1921; he also lectured to the Academy's entomological section on the homing of ants and the color vision of the honey bee. After his death in 1923 the Academy devoted an issue of the Transactions to him, printing three posthumous papers together with appreciations recording the roughly fifty treatises on neurology, invertebrate ecology and animal behavior he had published in his lifetime.

== Programs ==
=== St. Louis Science Fair ===
The Academy organizes the St. Louis Science Fair, open without charge to students in St. Louis city and county and the surrounding metropolitan area. It is run in a Regional Division, for kindergarten through grade 12, in which projects are judged on the display and materials alone, and an Honors Division for older students, which is affiliated with the Regeneron International Science and Engineering Fair and sends its leading entrants to that competition. St. Louis Magazine reported that about 3,000 students entered roughly 1,100 projects in 2026 and that one Honors Division entrant, who had worked with a University of Missouri–St. Louis chemist on a nanoporous gold sensor, took second place in chemistry at that year's international fair. The Academy reports that 2,878 students took part in 2026 and that $44,320 in scholarship money was awarded directly to students. The top three finishers in the Honors Division are honored at the Academy's annual awards ceremony alongside the scientists.

=== Junior Academy of Science ===
The Junior Academy of Science is a cohort program in which middle and high school students carry out a year of research, meet working scientists and take part in laboratory sessions hosted by local employers, ending in a research colloquium.

=== BioBlitz ===
The Academy organized a BioBlitz, a public biodiversity survey in which teams of volunteers led by biologists and naturalists record as many species as they can find in a defined area over one or two days, at the Missouri Botanical Garden's Shaw Nature Reserve in September 2015 and September 2017 and in Forest Park in September 2016; observations were logged on iNaturalist. Forest Park Forever, which supplied experts for the 2016 survey along with the Missouri Department of Conservation, the Donald Danforth Plant Science Center, the Saint Louis Zoo and the Missouri Botanical Garden, reported that it drew more than 400 participants over two days, including 117 students from five schools, and that more than 30 spider species were added to a park list that had previously recorded three.

=== Public programming ===
The Academy runs the monthly Science in St. Louis speaker series at St. Louis County Library branches, at which local scientists and other professionals present a different topic each month, and it organizes a STEM Signing Day for students and professional events for working scientists.

== Awards and fellows ==
The Academy presents the Outstanding St. Louis Scientists Awards, which recognize individuals and organizations for contributions to science, engineering and technology in the region. Recipients are recorded from 1995. The 22nd awards were held in 2016, when Ladue News reported that nearly 300 scientists and science advocates attended; the 24th followed in 2018, and the 28th were set for April 8, 2026 at the Missouri Botanical Garden.

The awards are given in several categories, among them the Peter H. Raven Lifetime Achievement Award, named for the botanist Peter H. Raven; the Science Leadership Award; the Fellows Award; the James B. Eads Award for Engineering; the George Engelmann Interdisciplinary Award, for work spanning disciplines or institutions; and the Science Educator Award. Recipients of the lifetime achievement award have included the medical physicist Michel Ter-Pogossian (1995), the neuroscientist John Olney (1996), the diabetes researcher Paul E. Lacy (1997), the geneticist Robert H. Waterston (2000), the archaeologist Patty Jo Watson (2002), the Nobel laureate in chemistry William S. Knowles (2008) and the neurologist Marcus E. Raichle (2011); the Science Leadership Award has gone to the botanist Peter Wyse Jackson (2017), the chemist and university chancellor Mark S. Wrighton (2019) and the entrepreneur Jim McKelvey (2020). The Academy separately elects Fellows, whom it describes as St. Louis scientists and engineers of national and international reputation.

== Organization ==
The Academy is governed by a board of trustees, from which an executive committee of officers is drawn, together with advisory trustees and ex officio members representing partner institutions in the region. As of 2026, the president is Toni M. Kutchan, a plant biochemist and retired vice president for research at the Donald Danforth Plant Science Center; its trustees and advisory trustees have included the evolutionary biologist Barbara A. Schaal, the botanist Peter Wyse Jackson, president emeritus of the Missouri Botanical Garden, and the entrepreneur and conservationist David Isserman. Kate Polokonis became executive director in October 2024, succeeding Mary E. Burke, who had led the organization for 19 years. In a later interview she described the Academy's aim as building "a strong foundation in science and mathematics so that we have a population of people who are ready to drive innovation and scientific advances forward into the region."

The Academy has held federal tax exemption since 1949. For the year ending December 31, 2024 it reported revenue of $654,836, expenses of $658,679 and net assets of $10.4 million. Its historical records, covering 1856 to 1959, are held by the State Historical Society of Missouri, and the St. Louis Public Library holds the bound minutes of its inaugural meeting.

== Attribution ==
- As of this edit, this article uses content from "official website", which is licensed in a way that permits reuse under the Creative Commons Attribution-ShareAlike 3.0 Unported License, but not under the GFDL. All relevant terms must be followed.
