= Francis Eugene Nipher =

American physicist and meteorologist (1847–1926)

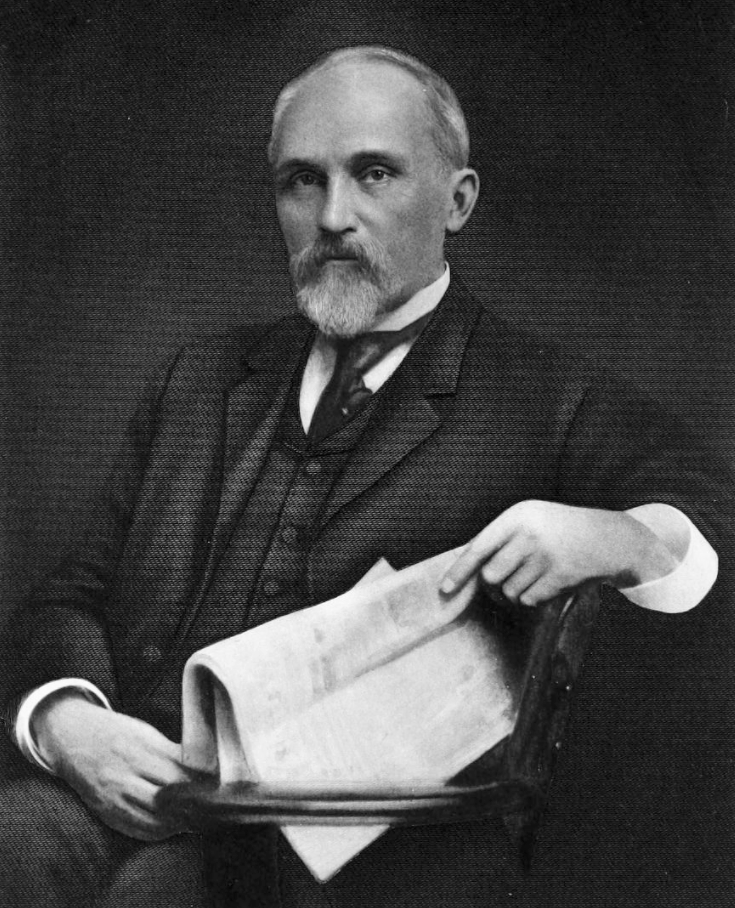
- Nipher in a 1921 publication
- Born: December 10, 1847; Port Byron, New York, US
- Died: October 6, 1926 (aged 78); Kirkwood, Missouri, US
- Occupations: Physicist, meteorologist
- Scientific career
- Fields: Experimental physics, astrophysics

Francis Eugene Nipher (December 10, 1847 – October 6, 1926) was an American physicist and meteorologist. Specializing in experimental physics and astrophysics, he contributed greatly to the understanding of electric discharges.

== Early life and education ==
Nipher was born on December 10, 1847, in Port Byron, New York, the son of Peter Nepher and Roxalana P. (née Tilden) Nepher. He was of German ancestry via his father, and of Old Stock American ancestry via his mother. In 1864, he and his father moved to Iowa City, Iowa.

In 1870, Nipher graduated from Iowa State University with a Bachelor of Philosophy. In 1905, he graduated from Washington University in St. Louis with a Doctor of Laws.

== Career ==
From 1870 to 1874, Nipher was a physics instructor for Iowa State University. He then moved to Kirkwood, Missouri. He taught astronomy at Washington University in St. Louis, becoming a professor of physics for the university in 1874. He worked as such until 1914, becoming an emeritus.

Between 1878 and 1882, Nipher conducted a magnetic survey of Missouri and just past the borders of the surrounding states. Nipher was also a meteorologist, establishing the Missouri Weather Service in 1887. He surveyed the damage of the Marshfield Cyclone, which struck on April 18, 1880.

From 1885 to 1890, Nipher was president of the Academy of Science, St. Louis. He was also president of the Engineers' Club of Saint Louis in 1890. He was a member of the Royal Society of Arts, the Société Française de Physique, and in 1907 was elected to the American Philosophical Society.

Nipher supported the gold standard, writing the pamphlet Evolution of the Divine Character in Man, which argued in favor of the gold standard using scientific arguments. In 1908, he was named in the United Kingdom's Who's Who despite being American; he and Daniel S. Tuttle were the only people from Greater St. Louis covered by the dictionary in its 1908 volume.

=== Studies ===
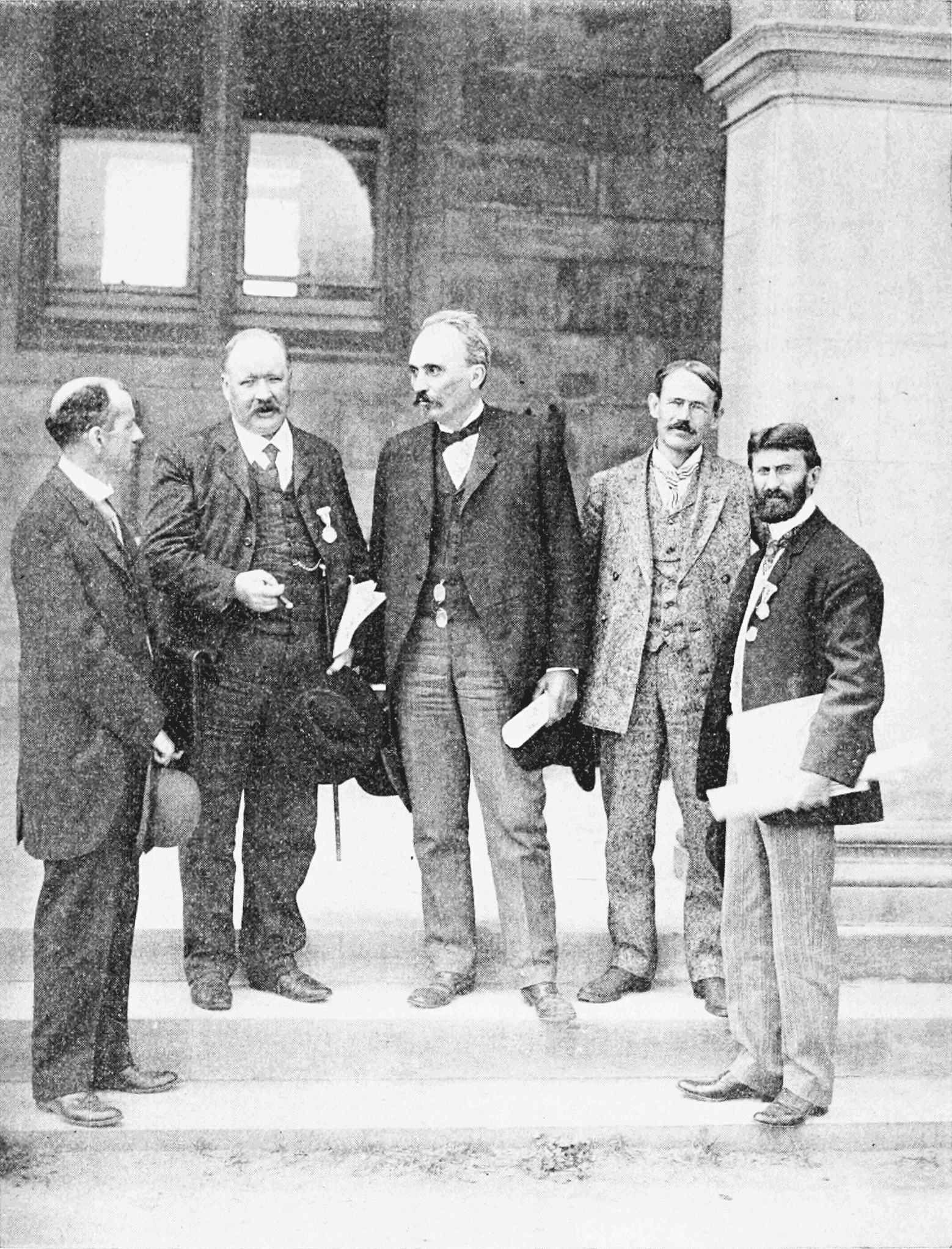
Nipher (center) with astronomical scientists at the Academy of Science, St. Louis, 1904. From L–R: Abbott Lawrence Rotch, Svante Arrhenius, Nipher, Henry Helm Clayton, and Louis Agricola Bauer.

In 1882 or 1883, Nipher predicted that horses would be able to trot a mile in two minutes by 1914, a claim which he backed using equations. He was mocked by jockeys for the prediction, but in 1912, Uhlan trotted a mile in 1:58. He estimated that horses would reach their fastest possible trotting speed in the year 2158, that being 99 seconds. He also made discoveries regarding compound pendulums.

In 1898, Nipher discovered that passing trains created aerodynamic suction, as part of his work as an expert witness for a case in which a boy was sucked under a train's wheels. With the same discovery, he found a way to remove velocity in pressure measurements of gasses moving through tubes. In 1903, he formed an equation for the Kelvin–Helmholtz mechanism of a nebula. He also found that overexposed photographs should be developed in direct sunlight, as opposed to in dark rooms. He discovered that geomagnetic storms vary due to solar radiation and weather.

In 1904, Nipher read his paper "Present Problems in Physics" before the International Congress of Science and Arts, in which he mentioned studying the nature of electric currents. He then spent five years studying them, publishing three papers on the nature of electric discharge in 1910 and 1911. He concluded that streamer discharges take in negatively charged particles that surround them. The conclusion was compared to the one-fluid theory of electricity. The conclusion answered many previously-unexplained phenomena, regarding anode rays, Faraday dark spaces, Lichtenberg figures, and lightning, among other phenomena.

== Personal life and death ==
On July 1, 1873, Nipher married Matilda Aikans, with whom he had five children. He spent his summers in Clark Township, Michigan. He died on October 6, 1926, aged 76, in Kirkwood, following a series of paralyzing strokes. He was buried at Oak Hill Cemetery, in Kirkwood. An archive of his papers is held by Washington University in St. Louis. Nipher Middle School in Kirkwood, is named for him.
