= William Henry Carroll =

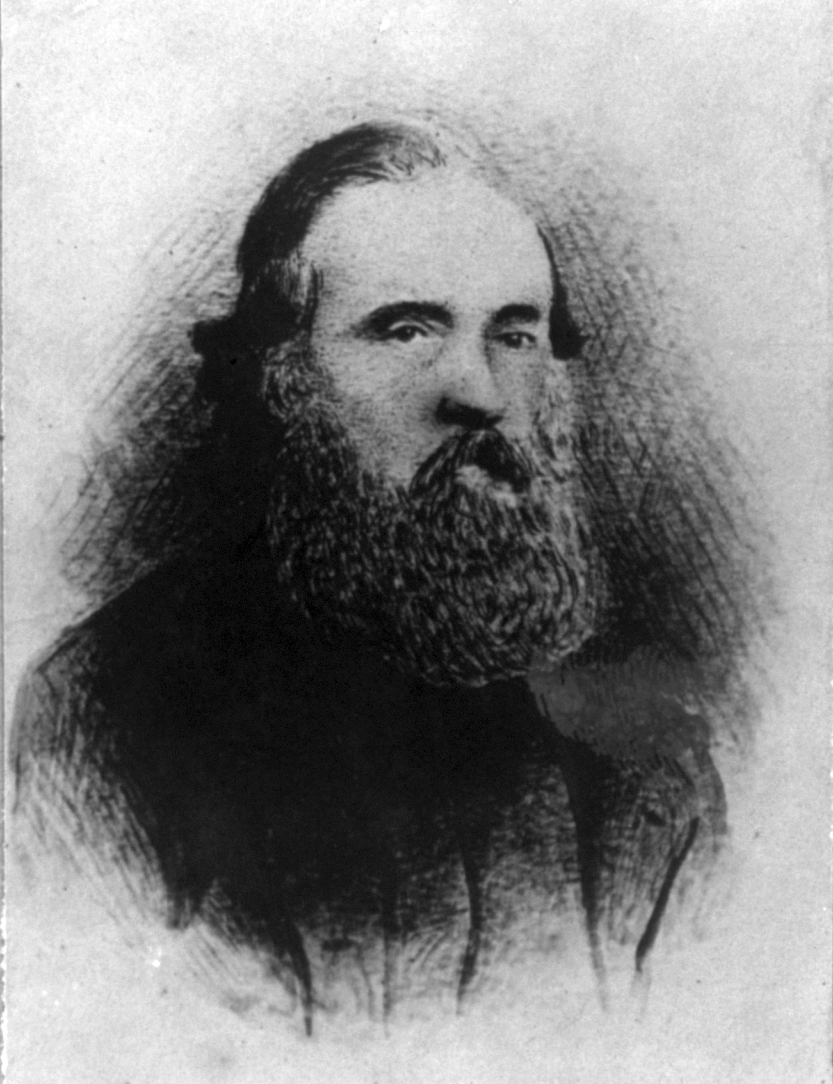
- Born: 1810; Nashville, Tennessee, US
- Died: May 3, 1868 (aged 57–58); Montreal, Quebec, Canada
- Burial place: Elmwood Cemetery
- Military career
- Allegiance: Confederate States of America
- Branch: Confederate States Army
- Service years: 1861-1863
- Rank: Brigadier General
- Unit: 37th Tennessee Infantry Regiment
- Conflicts: American Civil War: Battle of Mill Springs
- Other work: Planter, Postmaster

William Henry Carroll (1810 – May 3, 1868) was a wealthy planter, a postmaster, and a brigadier general in the Confederate States Army during the American Civil War.

== Early life ==
Carroll was born in Nashville, Tennessee to William Carroll, a general during the War of 1812 and multi-term Governor of Tennessee, and Cecilia M. (Bradford) Carroll. Prior to the Civil War, he commanded the 154th Regiment of the Tennessee Militia.

== Civil War service ==
On December 11, 1861, Carroll, as the Confederate commander at Knoxville, issued a proclamation declaring martial law in the city. He then arrested all those who were openly opposed to the Confederate States before restoring the civil authority. He commanded the 2nd Brigade in the District of East Tennessee, commanded by George B. Crittenden, that engaged George H. Thomas's Union forces at the Battle of Mill Springs in Kentucky on January 19, 1862.

Braxton Bragg, the Department commander, in his effort to rid his command of political generals had Carroll arrested for drunkenness, incompetence and neglect on March 31, 1862, as he was reported to have been drunk on duty in Iuka, Mississippi. Bragg brought similar charges against Crittenden the following day.

Like Crittenden before him, Carroll, after a court of inquiry, resigned on February 1, 1863. With Nashville, the state capital, in Union hands, he moved to Montreal, Quebec, Canada.

== Carroll in Montreal ==
The city of Montreal, at the time, was leaning with sympathies towards both sides of the American conflict. The streets were filled with spies from both sides, exiled Confederates of high rank, sympathizers, arms dealers, Union detectives and saboteurs. Carroll became a fixture at the luxurious St. Lawrence Hall on St. James Street (now Saint Jacques Street) which was where the more affluent Confederates in Canada stayed such as Jacob Thompson, Clement Claiborne Clay, James Westcott, Moses Montrose Pallen, Luke P. Blackburn, Nathaniel Beverly Tucker and even John Wilkes Booth. Many plots were formed by the members of this group. After staying in Montreal for a time, Carroll sailed south and was captured off the coast of North Carolina. He was placed in prison in Fortress Monroe, and was quickly released and forced to return to Montreal, Quebec. On June 8, 1865, Carroll and a friend named O'Donnell confronted Sandford Conover in front of the William Ennis saloon. They demanded to know whether he was using the alias James Watson Wallace, the man who had spun the web of false testimony towards the Assassination of Abraham Lincoln. Carroll accepted the affidavit swearing his innocence, later explaining it in great detail to Andrew Johnson.

== Post Civil War ==
He never returned to the United States. He died in Montreal on May 3, 1868. He is buried in Lenow Circle, Lot 57, Space #1 at Elmwood Cemetery in Memphis, Tennessee.

== See also ==
- List of American Civil War generals (Confederate)
