= Rishi coffin =

Type of coffin used in Ancient Egypt

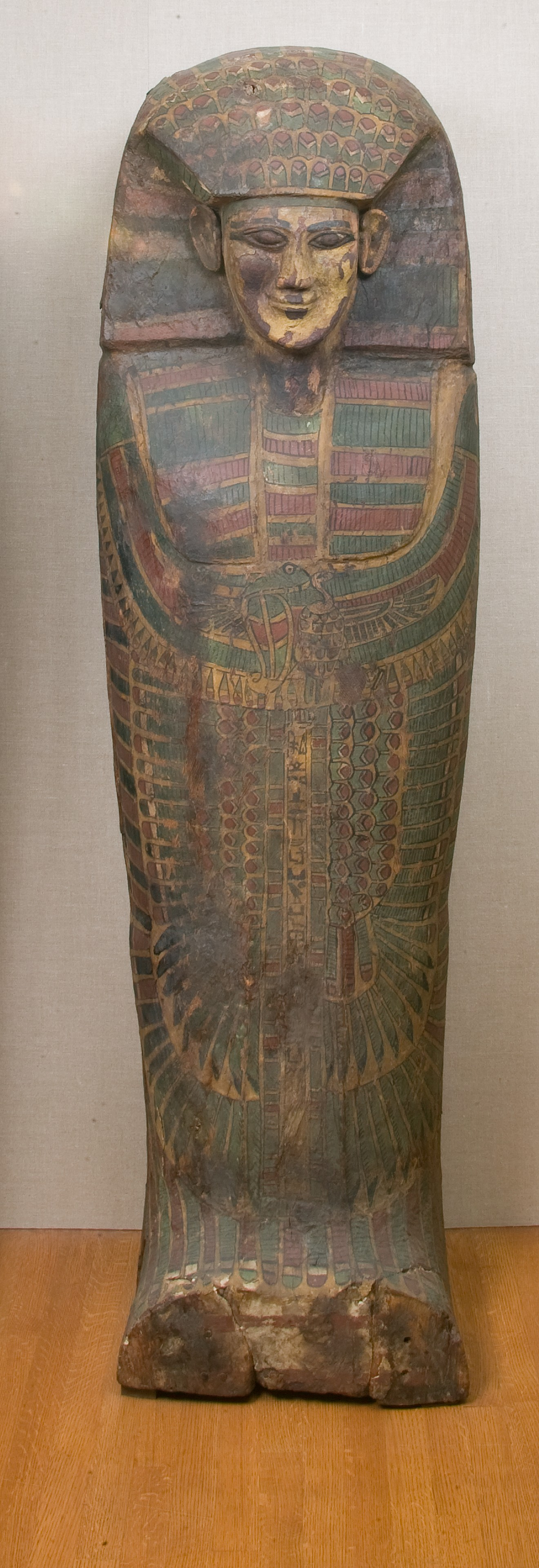
An example of a Rishi coffin.

Rishi coffins are a type of coffin that originated in Ancient Egypt and used prominently during the 17th Dynasty of Egypt. The word "rishi" is derived from the Arabic word risha (ريشة), meaning "feather." The coffins are decorated with distinctive painted feathers, hence the name.

== History ==
The earliest known Rishi coffins date back to the 13th Dynasty (18th-17th centuries BC); such a coffin was discovered in an 1860 excavation of the tomb of a "great scribe" named Neferhotep. Rishi coffins became prominently used during the 17th Dynasty (16th century BC), with pharaohs such as Intef VII, Seqenenre Tao and Kamose all interred in them.

Rishi coffins generally fell out of use during the rule of the 18th Dynasty (16th-14th centuries BC). However, one example of a Rishi coffin during this period of time has been discovered, that being the coffin found in the tomb KV55. This coffin belongs to the father of Tutankhamun and a son of Amenhotep III, although it has been disputed whether the coffin belongs to Akhenaten. The coffin, although well preserved, has its face damaged and the name of the king deliberately scratched off.

== Description ==
A typical Rishi coffin is a large and wooden, with an anthropoid (human-like) shape similar to the early forms of anthropoid coffins from the early Middle Kingdom. On the exterior of the coffin, painted feathers form wings that cover the body from the shoulder to the feet, while the head is that of a human wearing a nemes headdress. The design represented the deceased in the form of a pure human soul, which the ancient Egyptians depicted as a human-headed bird. Later Rishi coffins like the one in KV55 also had hands, sometimes in order to hold the royal scepters (crook and flail).

Unlike earlier forms of anthropoid coffins, Rishi coffins can stand on their own without the need for an external sarcophagus.

== See also ==
- Coffins of Ancient Egypt
- Sarcophagus
