= Imiut fetish =

Ancient Egyptian religious object

Z11 m w t Aa2
jmy-wt
in hieroglyphs

The imiut (jmy-wt) is a type of fetish, a religious object, that originates in Ancient Egypt. This fetish is made from a stuffed animal skin and is often tied to a pole that is connected to a stand. Its use in funerary rites has been recorded. Due to its association with Anubis, it has also been known as the "Anubis fetish."

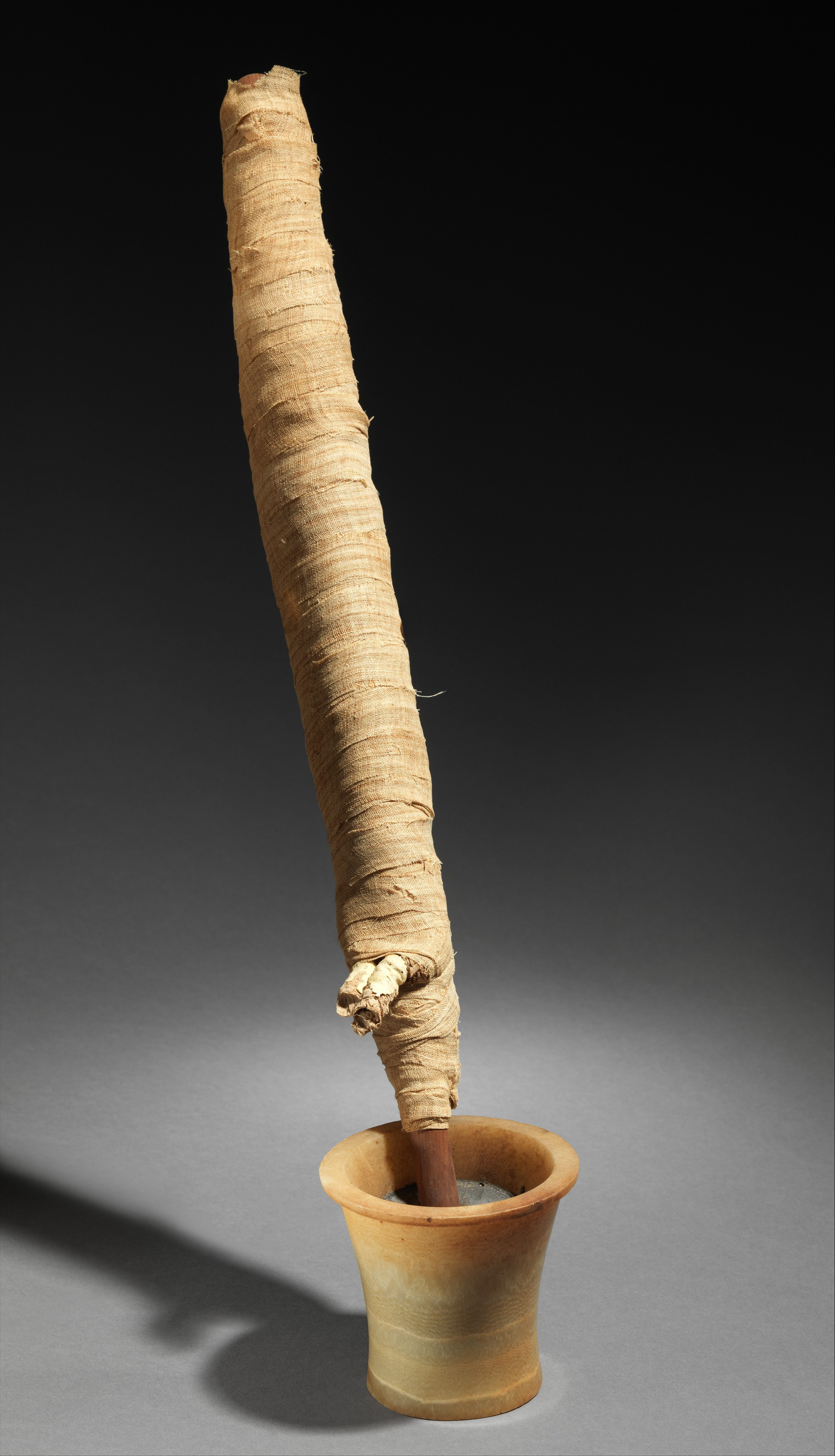
A preserved imiut from the reign of Amenhemhat II.

== History ==
In hieroglyphs, the imiut is known as jmy-wt. The earliest usage of such a fetish dates back to the Predynastic period, where a process involving a bird's entrails being tied to the imiut is mentioned on a preserved lug handle. The fetish later appears in the seals of the kings of the First Dynasty, most notably Den, where the fetish is associated with the ritual executions of prisoners. Usage of the fetish continued into the Middle Kingdom, with an example from the reign of Amenemhat II discovered during excavations in Memphis. During the Eighteenth Dynasty, such fetishes were very commonly used in funerary practices, with two found in the tomb of Tutankhamun.

The original use of the imiut was to represent the skin of Apis, which was associated with rebirth and regeneration. The association of the imiut to Anubis seems to have started around the time period of the Fourth Dynasty, with contemporary researchers and Egyptologists coining the term "Anubis fetish" to describe the imiut. During the Ptolemaic period, the imiut became associated with Osiris, as evidenced from illustrations on papyrus scrolls from that period.

== Description ==
An illustration of a pair of fetishes.

A traditional imiut is made from animal skin that is stuffed with wool and then tied around a pole that is connected to a circular base. The skin used may be from a bull, oxen, or sometimes even a feline. The imiut is meant to be a crude representation of an animal's corpse that is limbless and strung up on a pole. During the Eighteenth Dynasty, a new form of imiut appeared, which was made entirely of solid gold, from the pseudo-corpse, the pole, and the base.

== See also ==
- Glossary of ancient Egypt artifacts
