= Henut-wedjebu =

Ancient Egyptian noblewoman

W10 t V25 w M11 Z2
Henut-wedjebu
in hieroglyphs
Era: New Kingdom
(1550–1069 BC)

Henut-wedjebu was an ancient Egyptian noblewoman buried in the late Eighteenth Dynasty during the reigns of Amenhotep III or Amenhotep IV. She is known from her intact burial at Sheikh Abd el-Qurna, discovered in 1896 by French Egyptologist Georges Daressy. The same year, Henut-wedjebu's coffin and mummy was purchased by Charles Parsons and gifted to Washington University in St. Louis. Her coffin is on display in the Saint Louis Art Museum.

== Life ==
Henut-wedjebu (Ḥnw.t-wḏbw) bore the titles "chantress of Amun" and "lady of the house". Her name means "lady of the river banks". Radiologist Sanjeev Bhalla suggests she was probably pretty in life, with "a slender face and high cheekbones". Her teeth are in good condition. She may have died of an infection as there are signs of calcification in her lymph nodes and scarring in her lungs. Her skull was fractured and some joints were dislocated post-mortem, possibly during mummification.

Her mummy has never been unwrapped. CT scans indicate her brain, heart and lungs were not removed during mummification. Small objects seen around her head in the scans are thought to be beads attached to a large wig; other suggestions include a beaded shroud or mummification material.

== History ==
=== Discovery and purchase ===
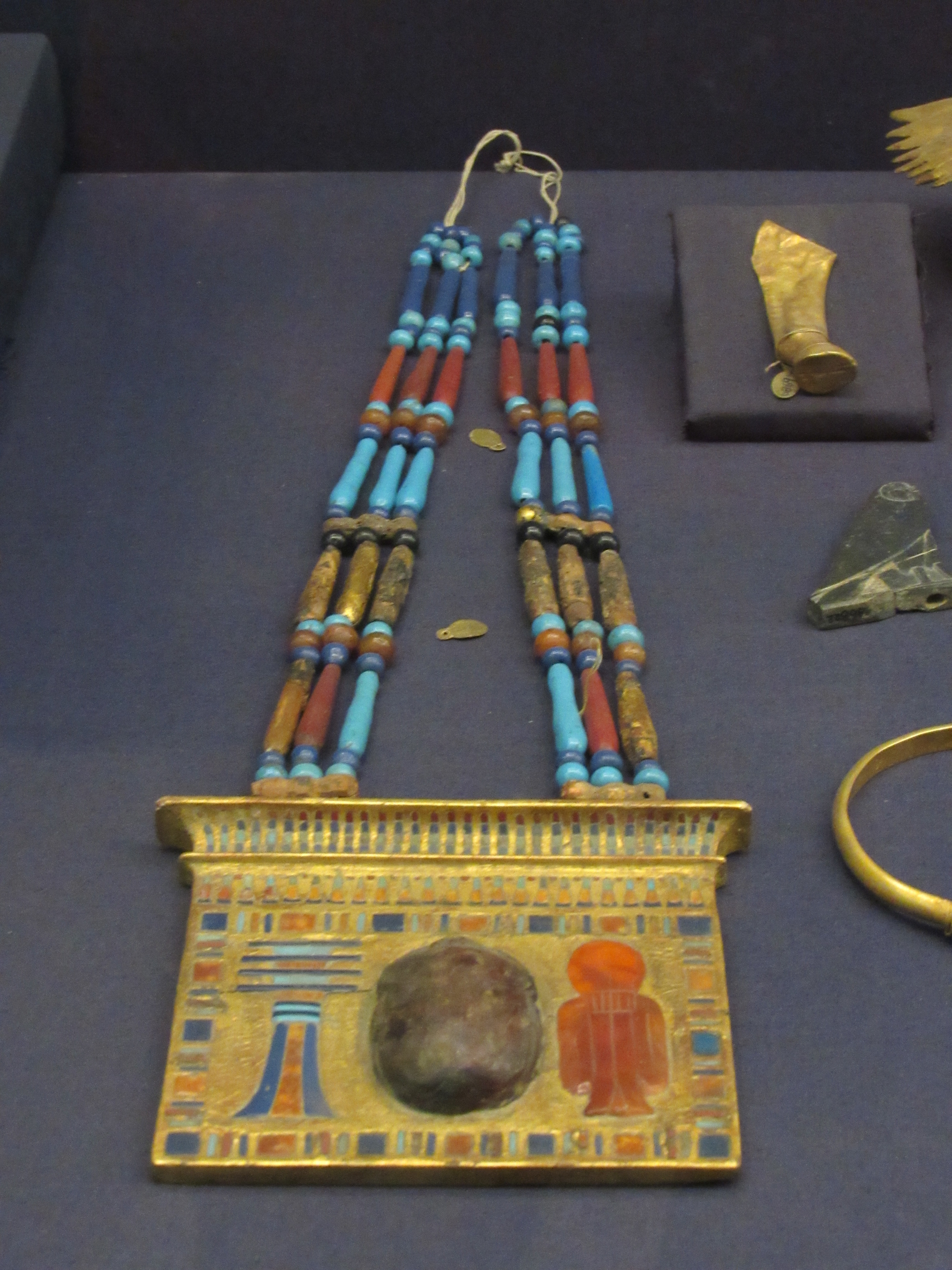
Pectoral of Hatiay found in the tomb

Henut-wedjebu's tomb was discovered on 1 March 1896 by Egyptologist Georges Daressy at the base of Sheikh Abd el-Qurna hill. Cut into the east face of the hill, the tomb, described by Daressy as a cave, was small and undecorated. The entrance was closed by a mudbrick wall. Four intact coffins were found in the space; a fifth coffin, placed towards the entrance, was crushed by debris. The tomb belonged to Hatiay, who was titled "scribe and granary-overseer of the Mansion of the Aten". Henut-wedjebu was presumably his wife, as she was buried in a similarly styled and ornate coffin. Two other women, Siamun and Huy, were buried in the same tomb.

In 1896 Henut-wedjebu's coffin and mummy were purchased by Charles Parsons through Émile Brugsch and gifted to Washington University in St. Louis. Her coffin is now permanently exhibited in the Saint Louis Art Museum.

== Coffin ==
Henut-wedjebu's wooden coffin is 64.5 inches (164 cm) long. It depicts Henut-wedjebu as a wrapped mummy wearing a striped wig and large broad collar. It has a black-based design with the wig, face and neck, collar, texts and other decoration in gilded gesso; the eyes and eyebrows are inlaid in coloured glass. Instead of hands atop the collar, breasts are modelled beneath the surface of the collar. This is the only surviving example of an Eighteenth Dynasty coffin with breasts; coffins with breasts are more typical of the Nineteenth and Twentieth Dynasties when the deceased is depicted in daily life dress. Below the collar, the goddess Nut kneels with wings outstretched and a prayer addressing her runs down the centre of the lid. Horizontal bands of inscriptions and texts across the lid and trough address other funerary deities including Anubis and the four sons of Horus. Nephthys and Isis are depicted kneeling at the head and foot ends respectively.

The style of the coffin decoration and the mention of the god Aten in the title of Hatiay place them in the late reign of Amenhotep III or the reign of Amenhotep IV (Akhenaten). Kozloff suggests it was made in the same workshops as the coffins of Amenhotep III's parents-in-law, Yuya and Thuya.

=== Burial goods ===
Henut-wedjebu was buried wearing a mummy mask of painted cartonnage; at the time of discovery the back was damaged. She was also equipped with two pectoral necklaces of gilded and inlaid wood in the shape of shrines. The larger contained a heart scarab flanked by kneeling figures and wedjat-eyes; the underside showed the base of the scarab, inscribed with text from the Book of the Dead, with a djed-pillar and tyet-knot on either side. The smaller depicts a man seated at an offering table with a priest offering flowers and purification; on the reverse is a pair of Anubis-jackals seated on tombs.

The only objects that were not on the body were what Daressy described as small bundles of twigs, placed beside the legs and torso.
