= Ancient Egyptian coffins =

Funerary Coffins of Ancient Egypt

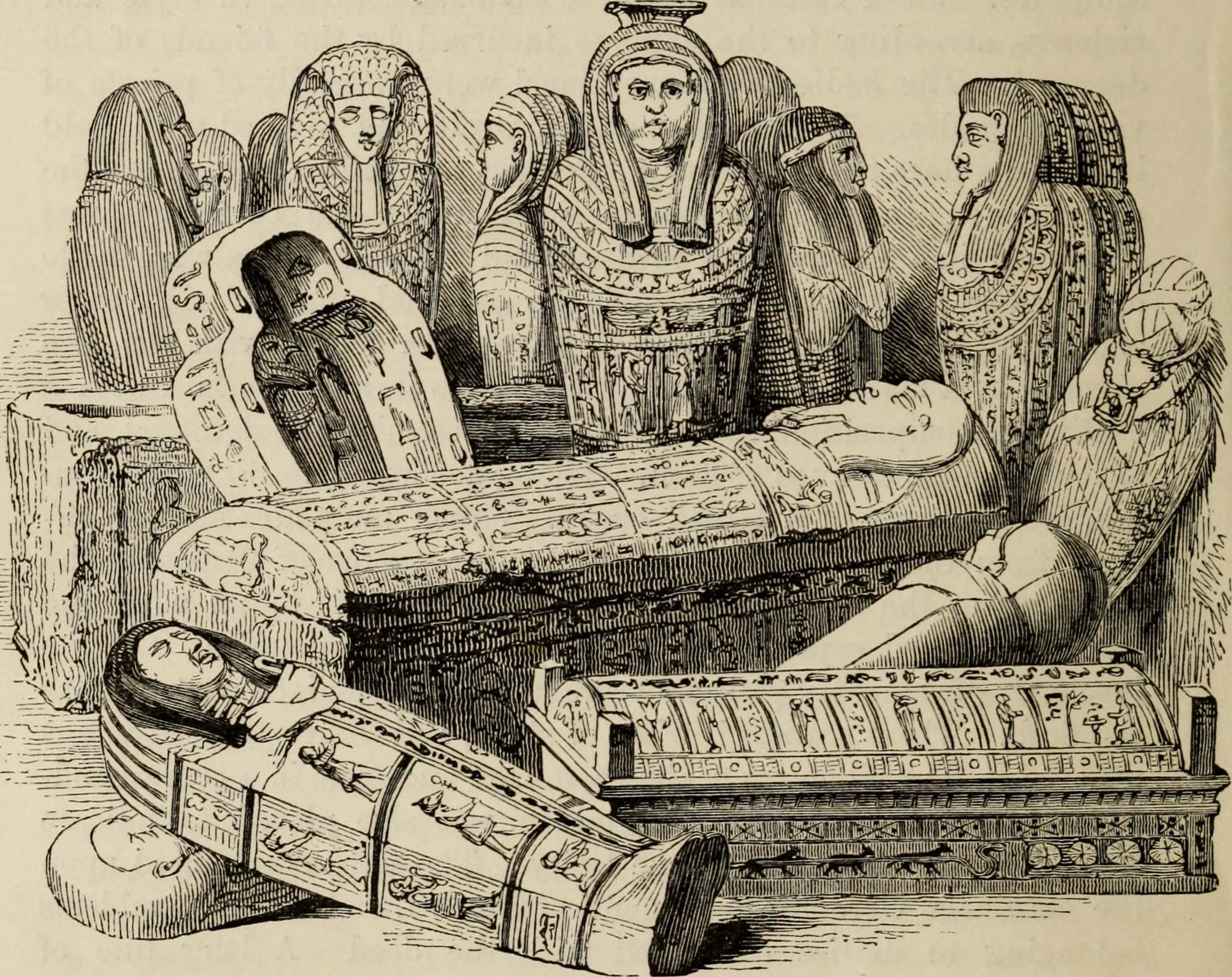
Egyptian Coffins from "Handbook of Archaeology" (1867).

Ancient Egyptian coffins were funerary boxes used to contain a corpse or mummy for burial or entombment during the Pharaonic period (c. 3150 BCE – 30 BCE) of Egypt. Coffins were an important part of Ancient Egyptian funerary practices. These body containers were thought to protect and transform the deceased, acting as a portal between the worlds of the living and the dead.

Only the elite of Ancient Egypt (perhaps less than 5% of the population) could afford a coffin of their own. Those with somewhat less wealth perhaps used coffins as shared temporary ritual objects of transformation without being buried in them, while the lower classes were interred in linen shrouds, palm-rib wrapping or nothing at all to enclose their corpses.

Royalty and the very wealthy sometimes utilized nested sets of funerary containers and protection rather than stand alone coffins. For instance, Tutankhamun's mummy was found in his tomb inside an inner golden coffin, a middle coffin and an outer coffin, which were all inside a granite sarcophagus, a pall on a frame and four shrines. Ancient Egyptian coffins came in two basic forms – rectangular (box shape) and anthropoid (human shape). Both types were generally made from wood, but for anthropoid coffins alternate materials such as stone and cartonnage were sometimes used.

Imported Lebanese cedar was the preferred wood type for high elite coffin construction throughout pharaonic history, with local varieties such as the sycomore fig used by those upper class Egyptians unable to afford or access high quality imported timber (sometimes decorated to imitate the Lebanese cedar they were unable to access).

== Terminology ==
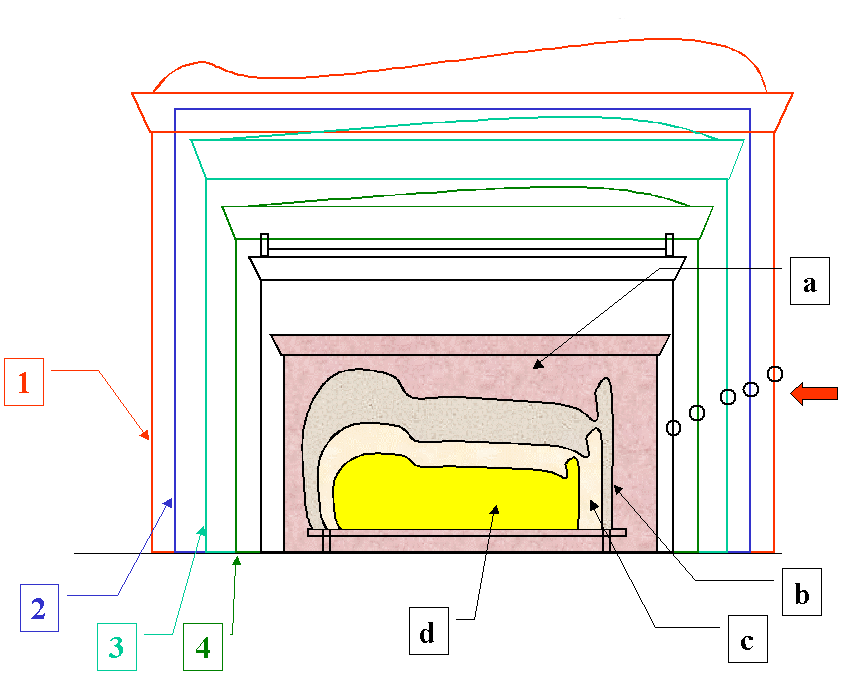
Tutankhamen's protective layers – (1) 1st shrine, (2) pall, (3) 2nd shrine, (4) 3rd shrine, (unlabeled) 4th shrine (a) sarcophagus, (b) outer coffin, (c) middle coffin, (d) inner coffin.

The somewhat overlapping terms used by Egyptologists for the main types of body containers have been inconsistently applied and varied over time. 'Coffin' is usually used for wooden containers that hold a corpse and generally extends to multiple nested wooden containers. 'Sarcophagus' is usually used for stone containers large enough to hold a coffin. However, particularly with regard the New Kingdom, 'sarcophagus' is often also used for an outer rectangular container made of wood containing smaller anthropoid (human shape) container(s) enclosing the deceased.

The elements of a coffin include the:

- Coffin box (or trough) – the part in which the body is placed;
- Coffin lid – the part placed on top closing the coffin;
- Coffin base – the bottom of the coffin (when laying down);
- Footboard – the panel at the bottom of the coffin (when standing up).

== Styles and development ==
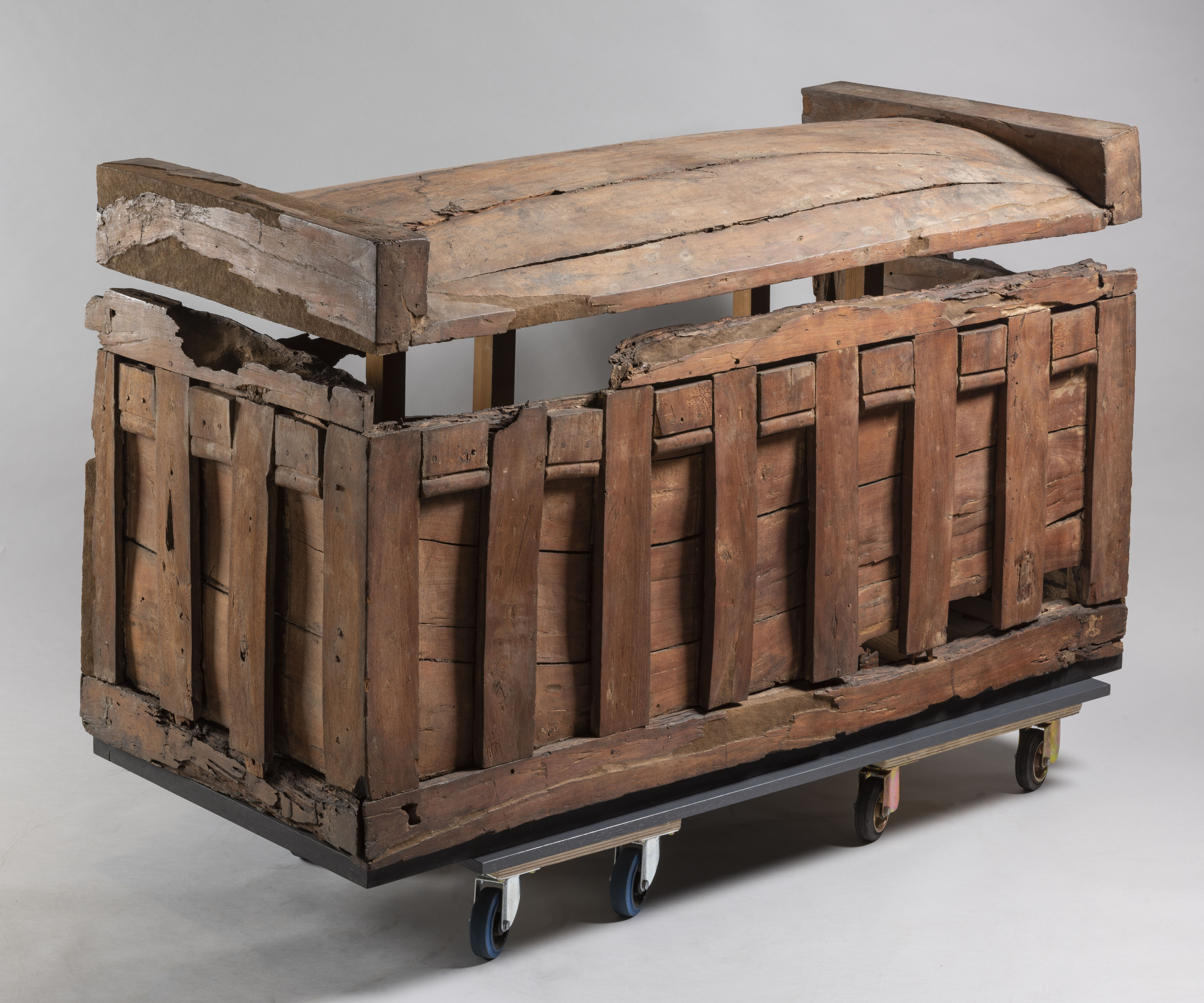
Old Kingdom rectangular palace-facade coffin, Museo Egizio (S 15701).

=== Rectangular coffins ===
During the Old Kingdom coffins were rectangular (with flat or vaulted lids), which continued to be the dominant shape until the later part of the Middle Kingdom.

The early rectangular coffins in the 4th Dynasty and 5th Dynasty were made exclusively for the royal family and high elite, and usually had no decoration or inscriptions on their internal or external surfaces.

The deceased were placed on their left-hand side in a curled up fetal position. These early coffins were relatively shorter and wider than later coffins designed for straighter body positions. The practice of placing the deceased on their side continued throughout the Old and Middle Kingdoms, although increasingly in a straighter more stretched out position.

Palace-facade style rectangular coffins, were popular during the Old Kingdom and Middle Kingdoms. Early examples used timber slats and niches to mimic a house or palace. Museo Egizio's S 15701 coffin is an example of this.

External surface decoration first became usual toward the end of the 5th Dynasty, with hieroglyphic offering formulas becoming common decorative element.

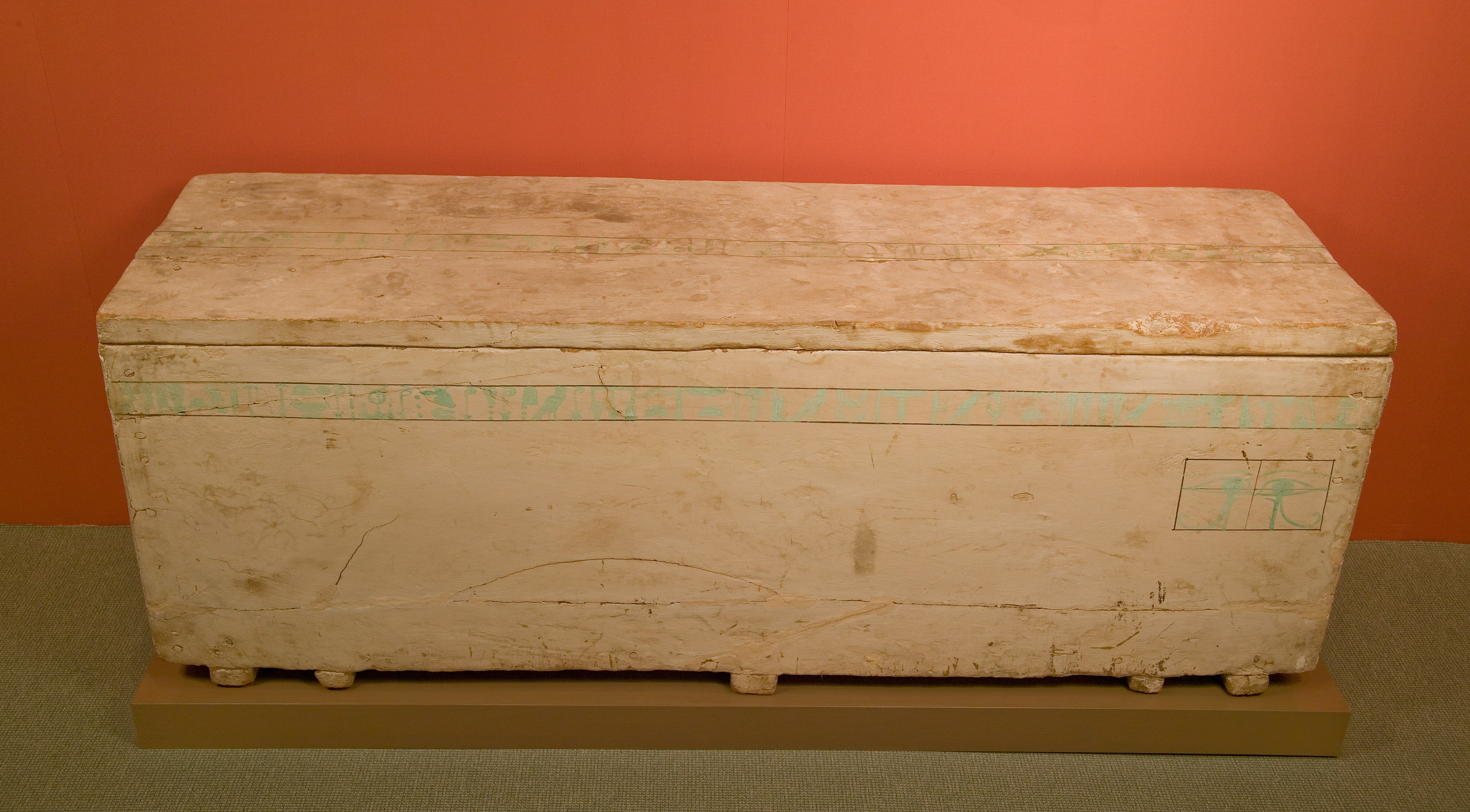
11th Dynasty outer coffin of child, Metropolitan Museum of Art (MMA 26.3.9a,b).

From the late Old Kingdom until the beginning of the 12th Dynasty a standard rectangular of box coffin type was common throughout Egypt. This standard type featured bands of hieroglyphic text around the coffin and along the top, as well as a pair of wedjat eyes on the lefthand side and the Coffin Texts inscribed inside. For example, the Metropolitan Museum of Art's outer coffin of a child (MMA 26.3.9a,b).

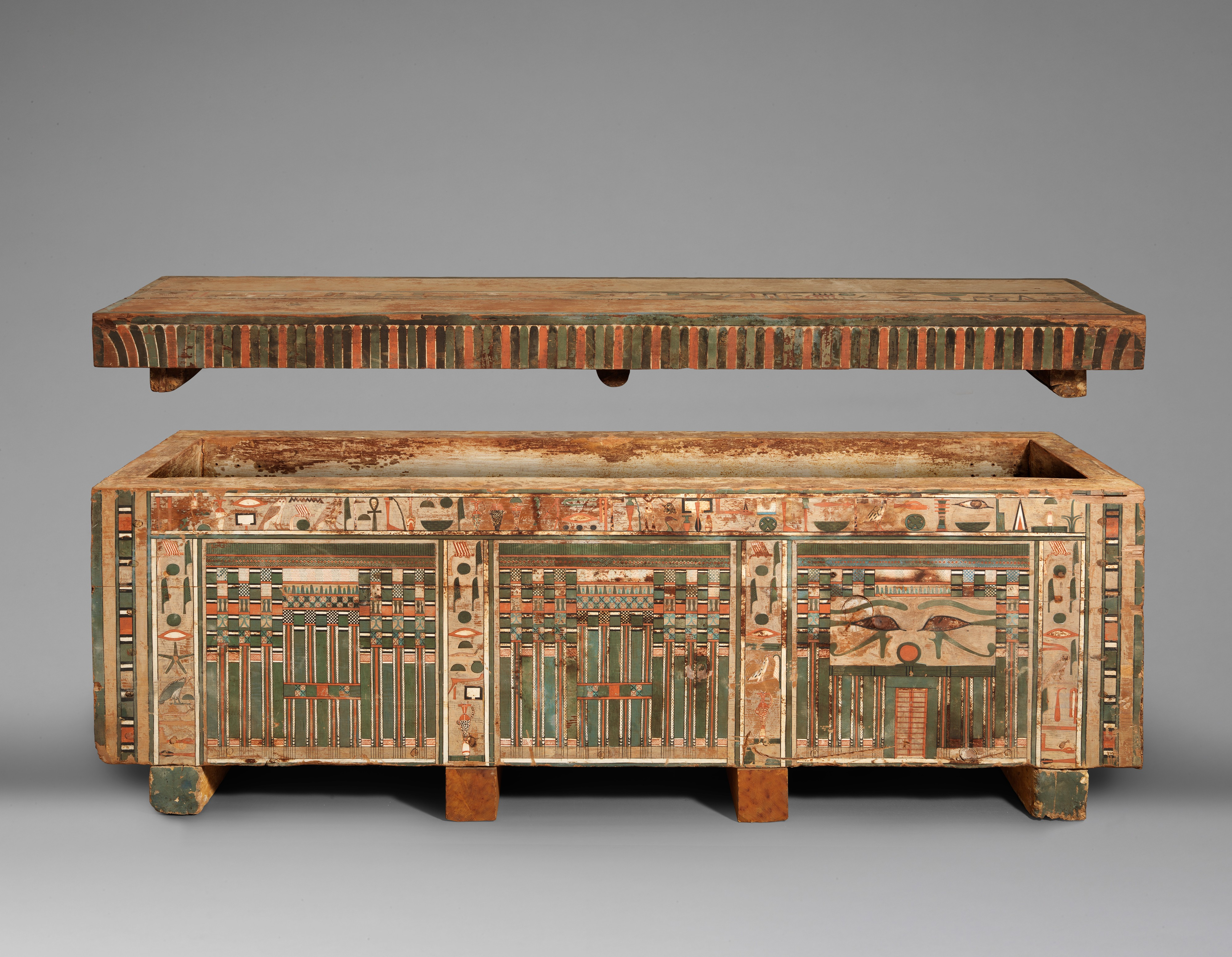
Middle Kingdom palace-facade coffin of Khnumhotep, Metropolitan Museum of Art (MMA 12.182.131a, b).

As the 12th Dynasty progressed, the decoration became more elaborate, with vertical bands of texts added to the sides and a false door below the wedjat eyes. Filling the remaining space with a palace-facade motif mimicking high status buildings was popular. The Metropolitan Museum of Art's Coffin of Khnumhotep (MMA 12.182.1311a, b) is an example of this.

=== Early anthropoid coffins ===
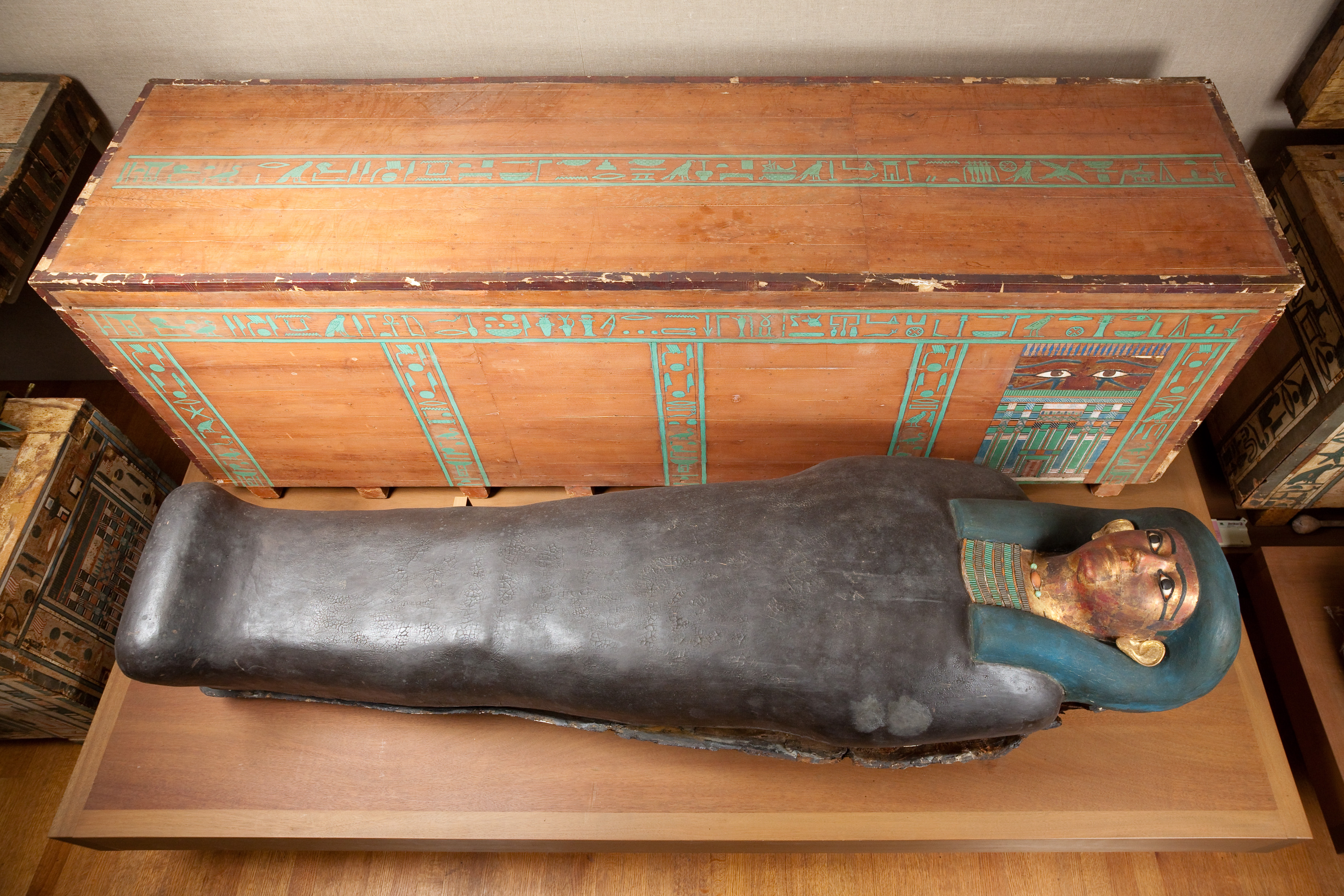
Middle Kingdom inner anthropoid coffin and outer coffin of Nephthys, Metropolitan Museum of Arts (MET 11.150.15b and MET 11.150.15a).

In the Middle Kingdom anthropoid (human shape) coffins started to appear, with sporadic examples known from the 11th Dynasty.

Designed to mimic masked mummies, they depict a human head and body without separate arms or legs, as if wrapped in linen. These coffins are also referred to as mummiform (mummy shape).

Such early anthropoid coffins were always enclosed within rectangular coffins rather than being independent burial containers. The outer rectangular coffins were still decorated with bands of hieroglyphic script and a pair of wedjat eyes on their left side. The body (including any mummy mask or anthropoid coffin) was placed on its side as if looking through these eyes.

=== Rishi coffins ===
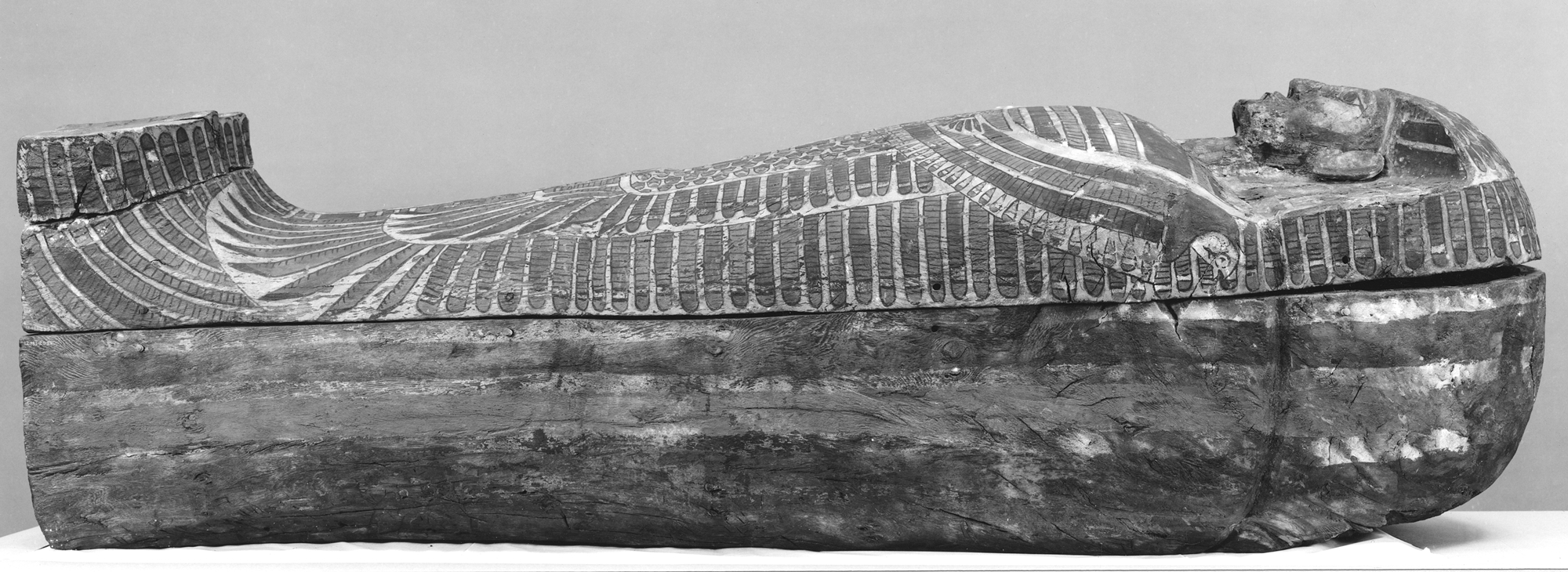
Rishi coffin of the Lady Rini, Metropolitan Museum of Art (MET 12.181.299).

Toward the end of the Second Intermediate Period, the distinctive feather patterned Rishi coffin developed for royalty and the high elite. These anthropoid coffins, feature huge wings that cover from the shoulder to the feet, depicting the deceased as a human headed bird. These large coffins were usually not enclosed in a sarcophagus.

Unlike the early anthropoid coffins, these could be independent burial containers, with the deceased beginning to be positioned on their backs rather than their sides.

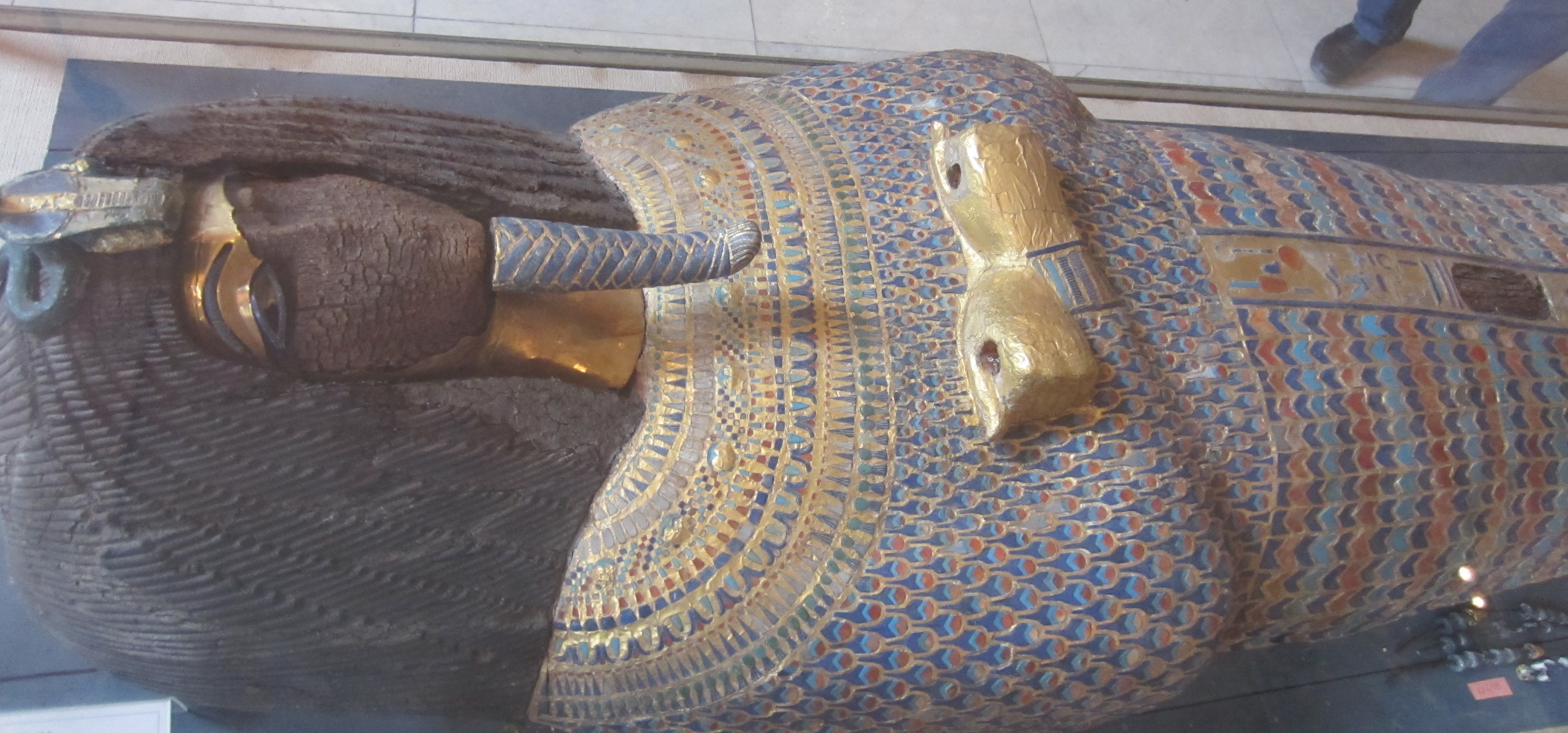
Late 18th Dynasty feather patterned KV55 coffin, Egyptian Museum, Cairo.

The rishi design generally fell out of use early in the 18th Dynasty, although royal usage of versions of this rishi feather pattern continued into later periods. For instance, Tutankhamun's coffins and the KV55 coffin are decorated with a rishi motif, albeit a more abstract depiction of feathers than on the early coffins of the style.

=== 'White' coffins ===
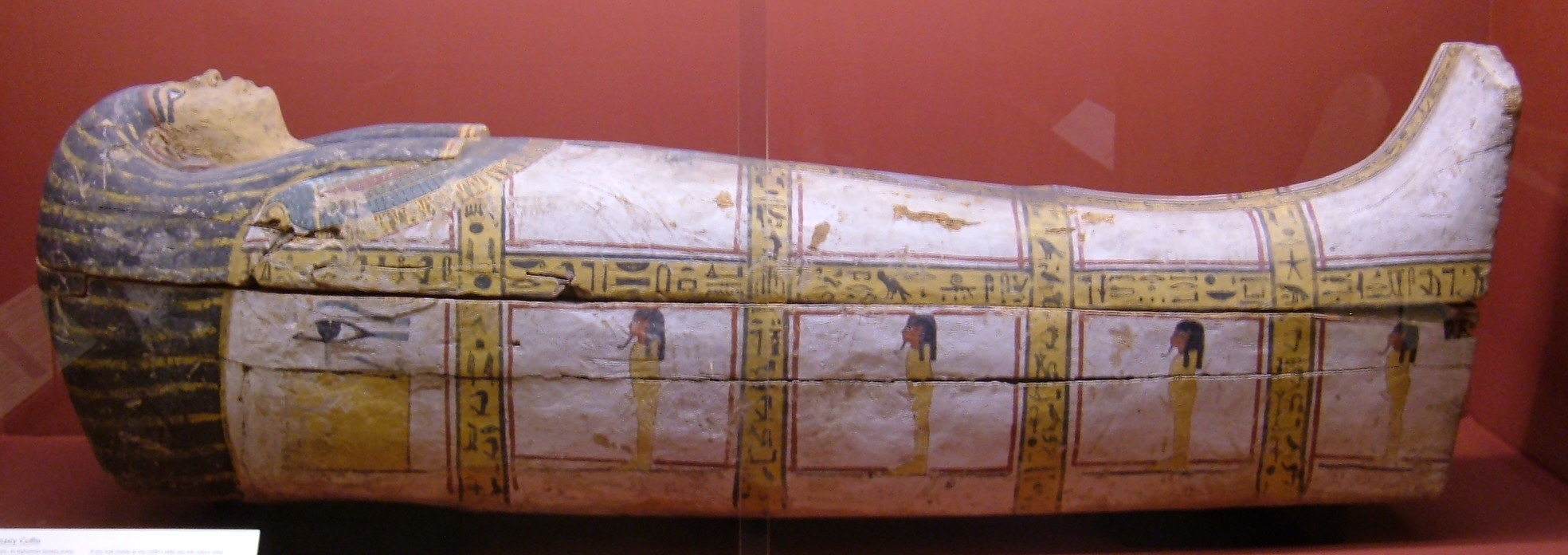
Early 18th Dynasty 'white' coffin, Rosicrucian Egyptian Museum (RC 1678).

The 'white' coffin type of anthropoid coffins belong to a brief period during the early part of the 18th Dynasty.

Like early anthropoid coffins of the Middle Kingdom, 'white' type coffins resemble masked mummies, with yellow or gold bands of hieroglyphic text mimicking mummy bands on a white background imitating linen wrappings. Decorative elements found on rectangular coffins of the Middle Kingdom, such as false doors and wedjat eyes are also found on white coffins (although with the just one eye on each side of the coffin, reflective of the deceased lying on their back instead of side).

18th Dynasty coffins can be seen as a material representation of parts of the Book of the Dead that had previously been included in funerary papyri, such as depictions of gods protective of the dead (Anubis, Thoth, Isis, Nephthys and the Four sons of Horus), encasing the deceased in their protective spells and iconography.

=== 'Black' coffins ===
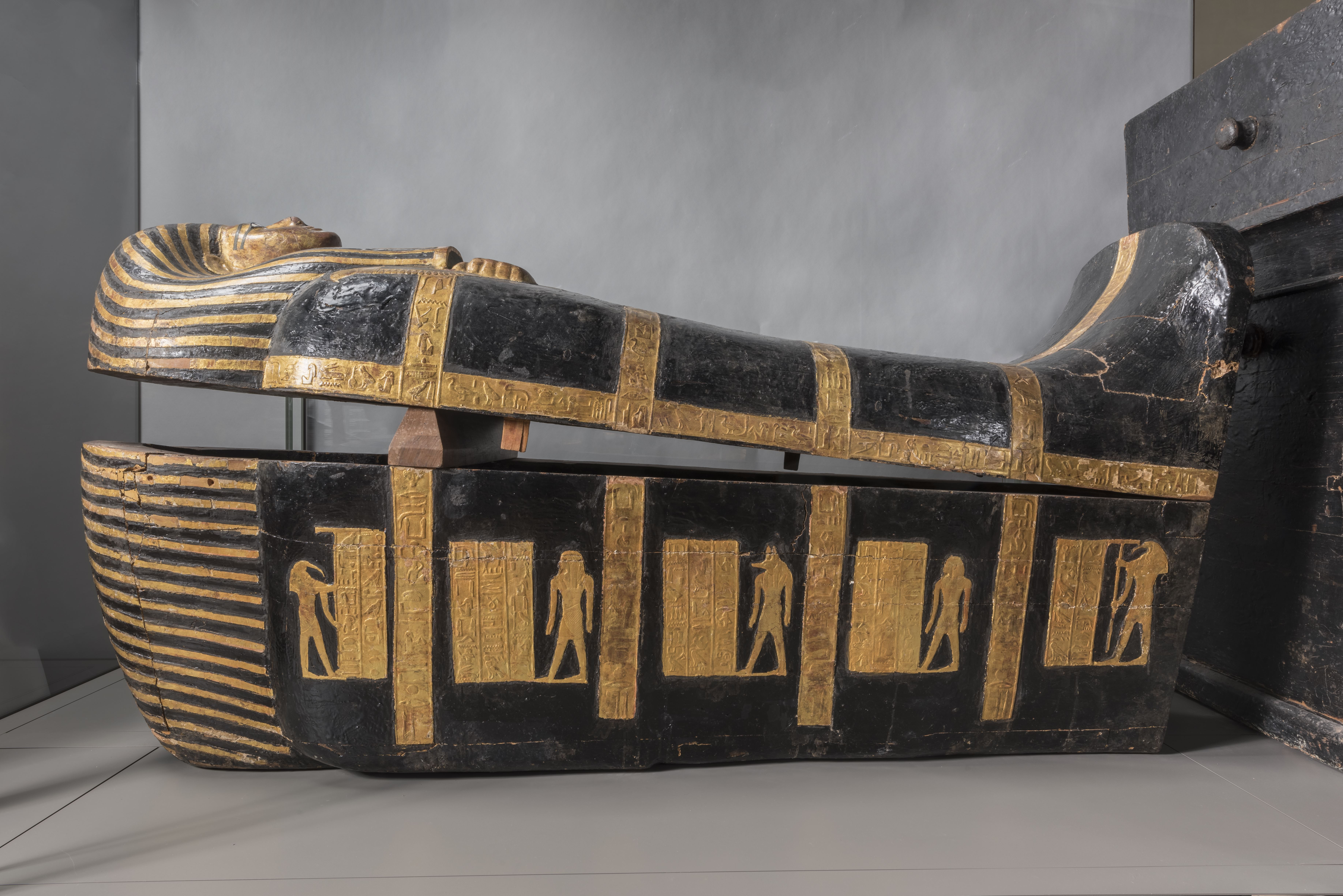
18th Dynasty 'black' middle coffin of Kha, Museo Egizio (Suppl. 8316/01)

The 'black' coffin style appeared after the early part of the 18th Dynasty continued until well into the 19th Dynasty. These are similar to the 'white' style, with the black replacing white as the dominant background color. This style replaced both the 'white' coffin and rishi coffin styles (excepting for royalty where rishi pattern coffin use persisted).

The coffins of Yuya and Thuya (parents-in-law of the Pharaoh Amenhotep III) in Cairo Museum, and Kha and Merit at the Museo Egizio, are famous examples of this style.

=== 'Festive dress' coffins (Amarna) ===
During the Amarna period late in the 18th Dynasty, a very different style of coffin appeared depicting the deceased in 'festive dress' long white robe type clothing rather than like a mummy.

Given the radical political upheaval and shift in state approved religious beliefs, a complete decorative redesign of the coffin was required for this brief period. Religious iconography depicting many gods and the journey through the Amduat were no longer considered appropriate in the funerary art of the monotheistic Aten worshiping society of Pharaoh Akhenaten. Unfortunately, direct archaeological evidence of coffins of this period is particularly scarce, with understanding based on fragments and extrapolation from related sources and later coffins.

=== 'Proto-yellow' coffins and fusion styles ===
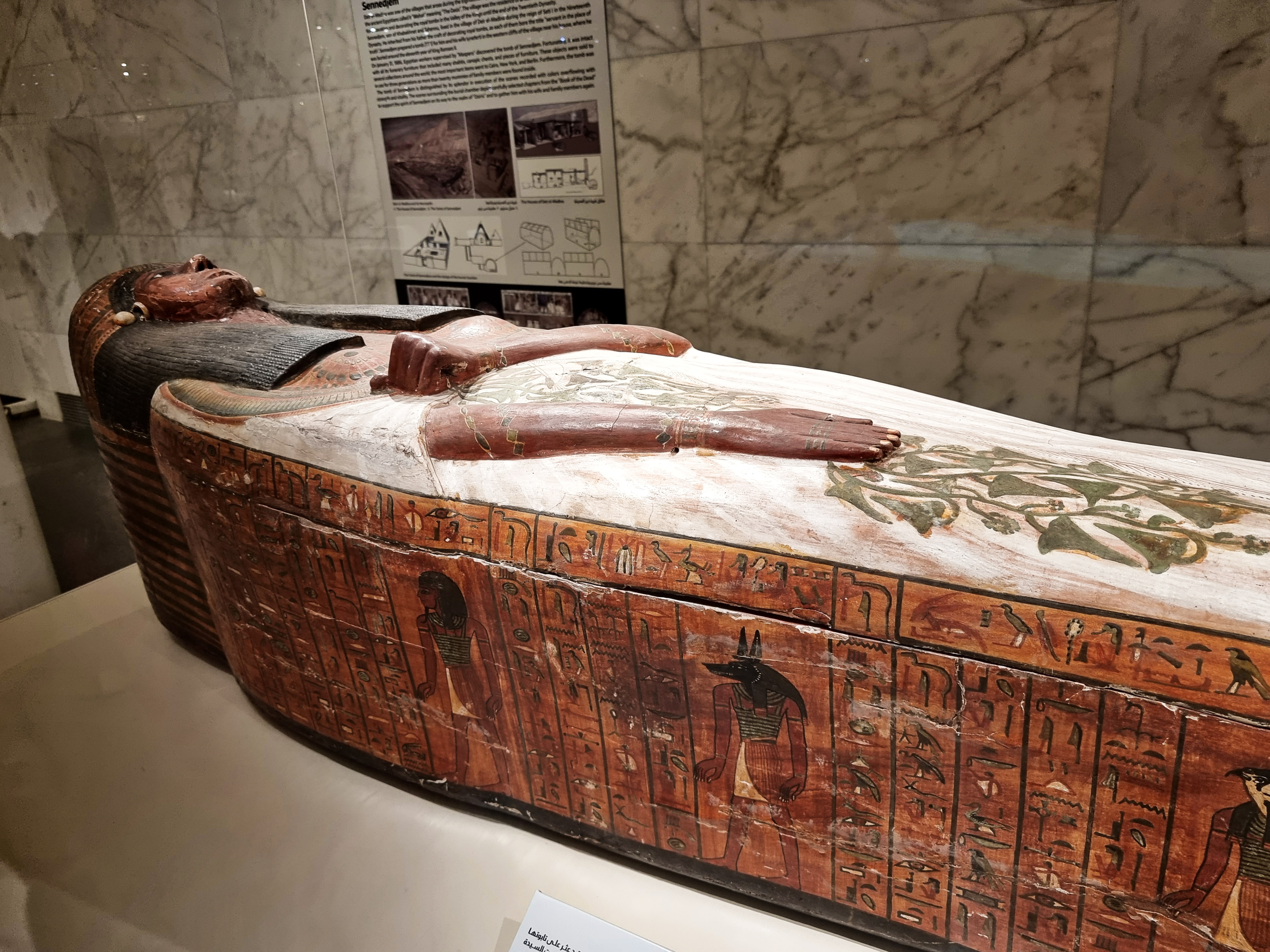
19th Dynasty 'proto-yellow' coffin of Lady Iset with 'festive dress' type lid and 'black' type decorative features on yellow background, from tomb TT1, National Museum of Egyptian Civilization (JE 27309).

After the late 18th Dynasty reign of Akhenaten, the 'black' coffin once more became the dominant style, but incorporated some of the living person 'festive dress' type imagery from the Amarna period design changes. The previously strong decorative unity between lids and boxes broke down, with some examples having lids of the 'festive dress' style and boxes of the 'black' style. This fusion style eventually evolved into the 'yellow' coffin style.

To what extent the 'yellow' style begins with the first examples of yellow background coffins during the mid-18th Dynasty reign of Amenhotep III (which are otherwise similar to 'black' style coffins), or requires other stylist characteristics that appear in the early 19th Dynasty is a matter of debate. The 'proto-yellow' coffin is often used to describe early yellow background coffins which incorporate elements of the 'black' style and 'festive dress' style but do not include all the decorative features associated with the 'yellow' style.

For instance, the 19th Dynasty coffin of Lady Iset from tomb TT1 at the National Museum of Egyptian Civilization (JE 27309) incorporates a predominantly 'festive dress' style lid with a box that includes iconographic features common to 'black' style coffin on a yellow background.

=== 'Yellow' coffins ===
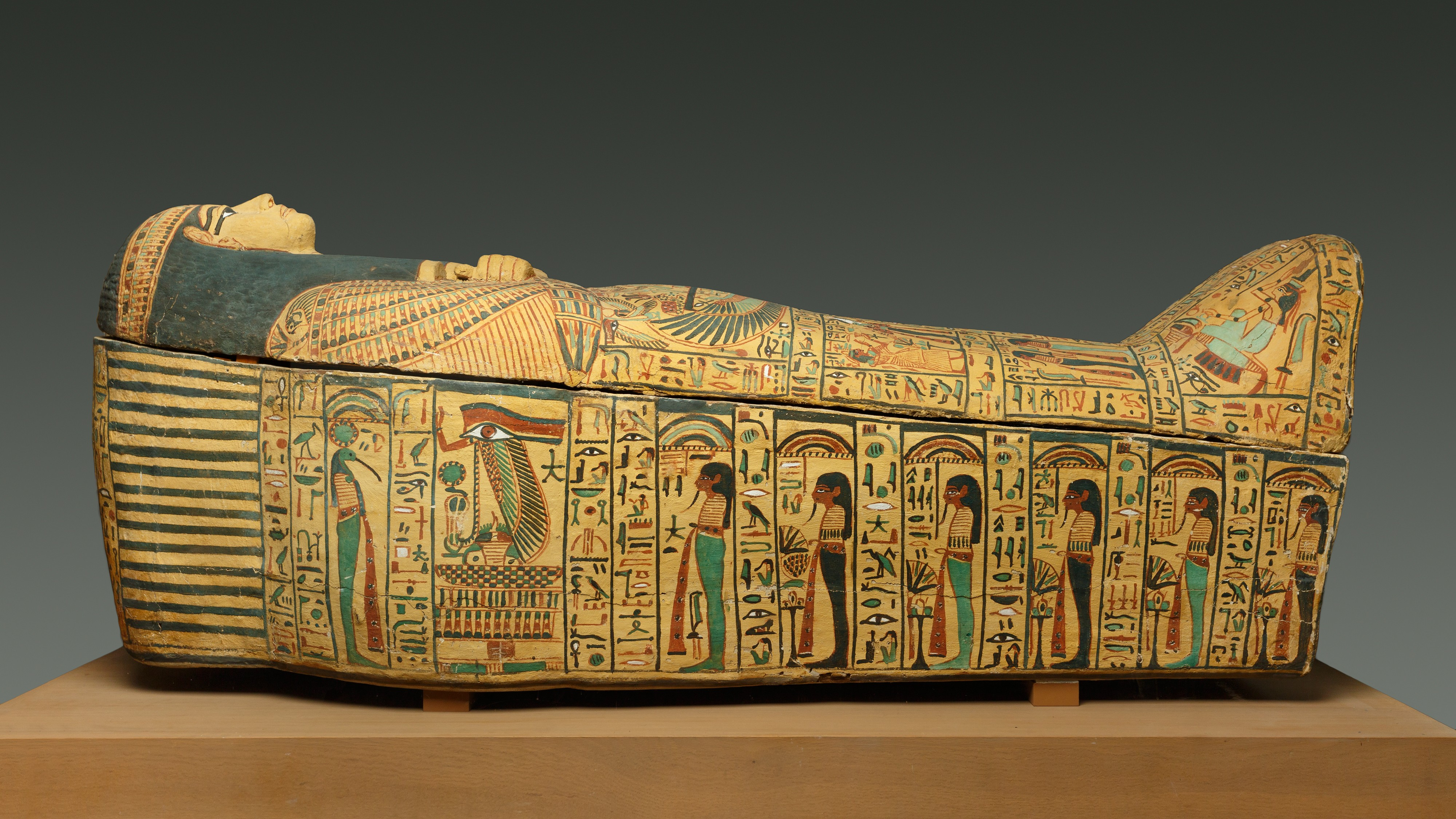
3rd Intermediate Period 'yellow' outer coffin of Iotefamun, Metropolitan Museum of Art (MMA 26.3.1a, b).

One of the longest persisting styles of Egyptian coffin, continuing in use into the early 22nd Dynasty, is the 'yellow' coffin.

The 'yellow' coffin style is characterized by yellow backgrounds, with increasing elaborate decoration and text leaving little unfilled space. This Horror vacui (fear of empty spaces) art style corresponds with a period when coffin reuse was particularly common. According to Kara Cooney, "It is no surprise that the yellow coffin decoration developed during the height of coffin reuse was a polychromy full of complicated text and iconography. It hid reuse actions well. Modifications in names and titles were difficult to spot within the busy, shiny decorative surfaces."

Typical 'yellow' coffins represent the deceased as a mummy with long floral collars concealing their arms. However, early examples until the mid-21st Dynasty sometimes incorporated decorative elements reminiscent of the earlier 'festive dress' style (e.g. festive wigs and pleated sleeves over arms) and in the late 21st Dynasty there was a resurgence of 'festive dress' features (e.g. depiction of forearms and use of white ground) sometimes described as 'archaizing' or 'opportunistic'.

=== 3rd Intermediate Period coffins ===
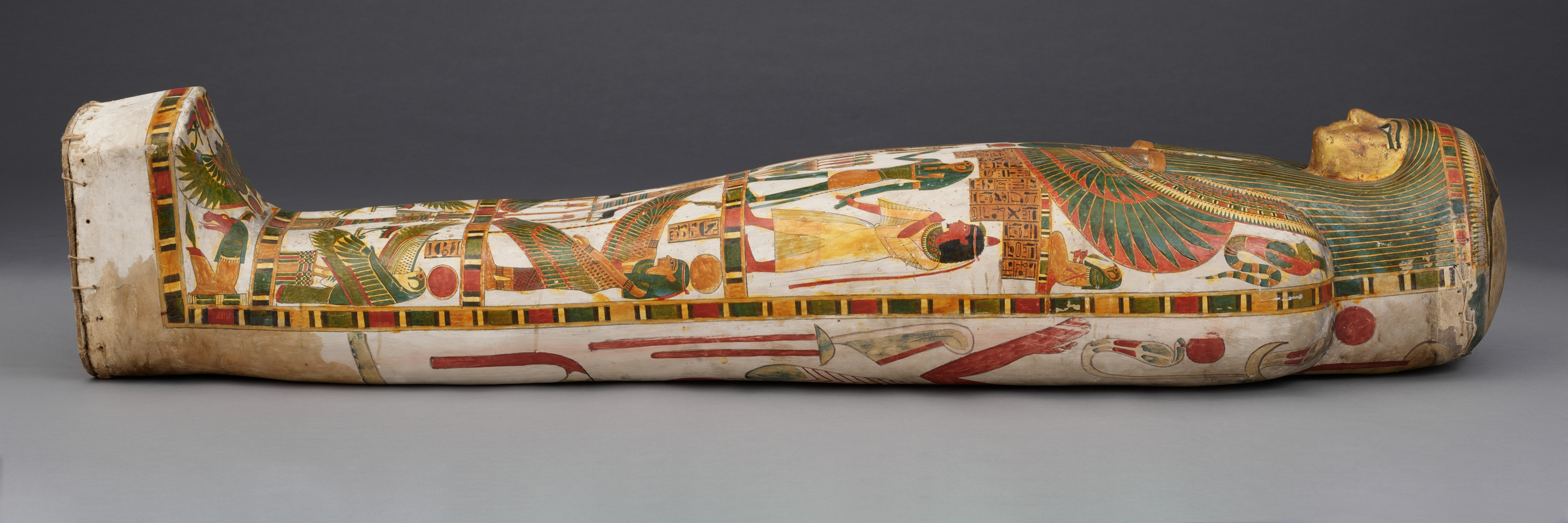
3rd Intermediate Period all encompassing cartonnage of Paankhenamun, Museo Egizio (Cat. 2218/01)

During the 3rd Intermediate Period, another major shift in coffin style occurred, with the advent of all encompassing cartonnage mummy cases and sparser decoration on coffins. Middle and Outer coffins in nested sets tended to have particularly simple decorative schemes often comprising just a single column of text.

The 3rd Intermediate Period was a time of political division between Upper Egypt in the South and Lower Egypt in the North. Most surviving coffins from this time come from Thebes in Upper Egypt and consequently those tend to dominate conceptions of the coffins of this period. However, surviving examples from Lower Egypt show a distinctly different decorative schemes featuring winged scarabs whose wings framing the face, and lace like patterns on their hands similar to gloves.

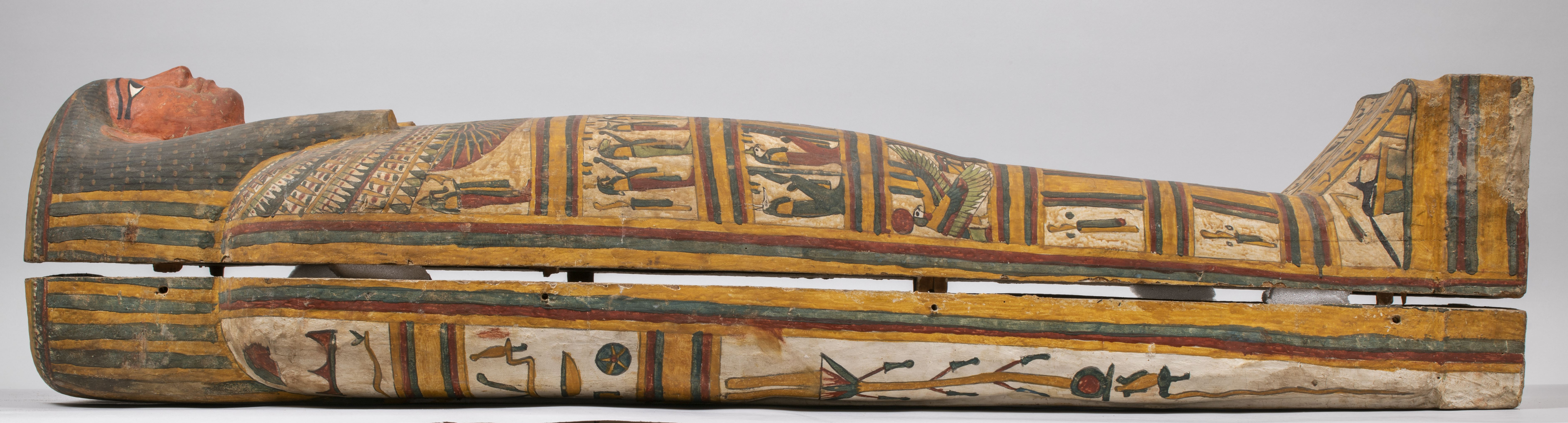
Late 3rd Intermediate period inner coffin of Tamit, Museo Egizio Turin (Cat. 2218/01)

A new 'bivalve' type inner coffin developed in the latter part of the 3rd Intermediate Period, replacing whole-body inner cartonnage coverings. These inner coffin had shallower boxes than earlier coffins with a timber pedestal at the feet and back pillar.

=== Late Period and Ptolemaic coffins ===
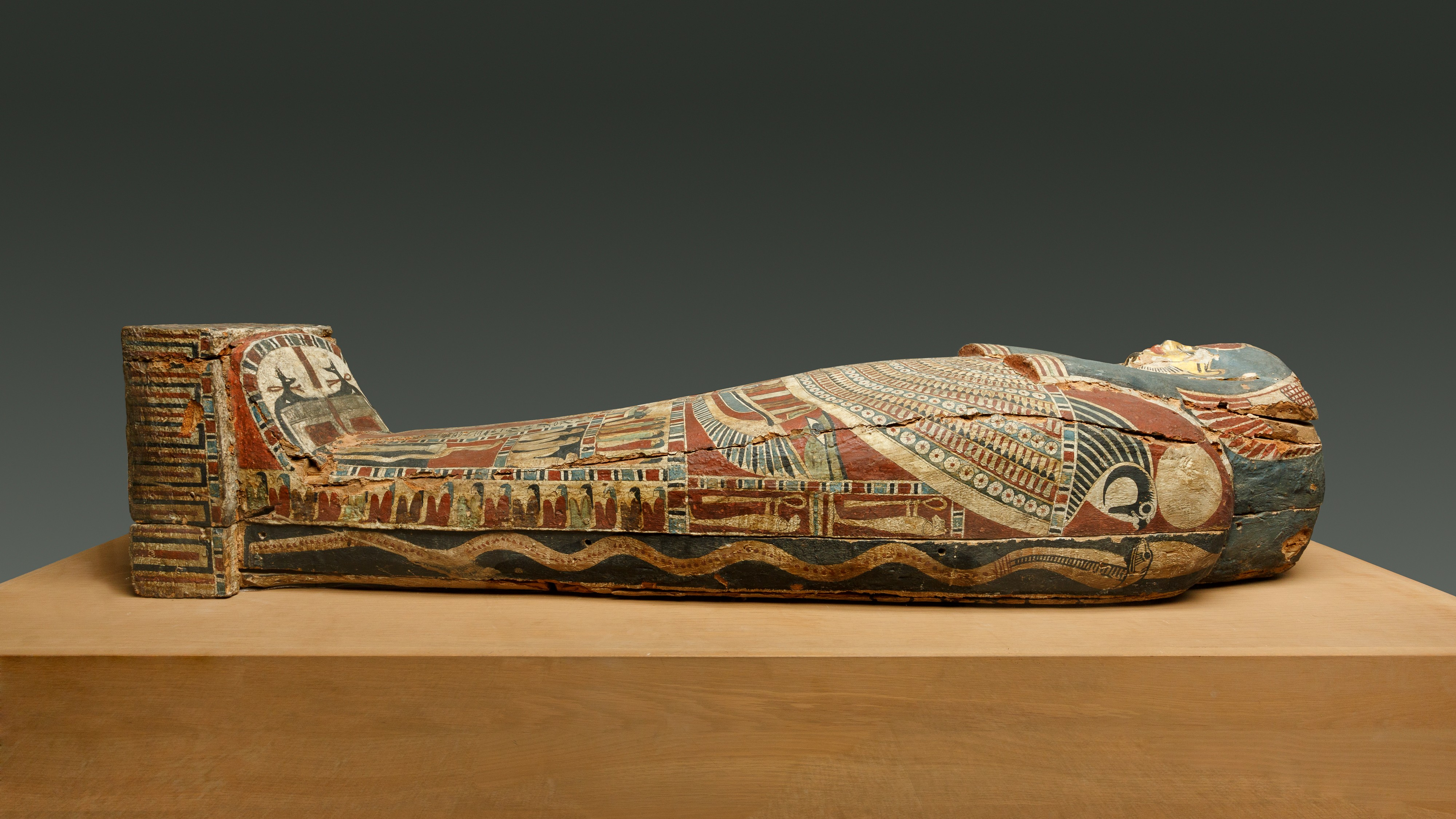
Ptolemaic inner coffin of Lady Nefer, Metropolitan Museum of Art, (MMA 20.4a, b)

Coffins of the Late Period elite showcased timber, and incorporated innovations to display their conspicuous consumption (e.g. a timber pedestal at the feet allowed the coffins to stand tall on their feet to display high cost timber, gilding and painted decoration).

As the Late period progressed and then moved into the Ptolemaic Period, coffins continued to evolve, with head ends becoming less rounded and outer coffins taking on the same shallow box with pedestal footed form that the inner coffins had. Faces became broader, to the point some are grossly exaggerated compared to their bodies.

== See also ==
- Ancient Egyptian afterlife beliefs
- Ancient Egyptian funerary practices
- Ancient Roman sarcophagi
