= Nathaniel Holmes (judge) =

Member of the Supreme Court of Missouri from 1865 to 1868

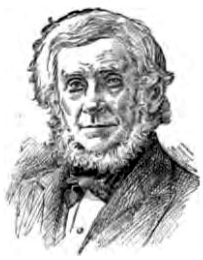
Nathaniel Holmes

Nathaniel Holmes (January 2, 1814 or July 2, 1814 or July 2, 1815 in Peterborough, New Hampshire— February 26 or March 26, 1901 in Cambridge, Massachusetts) was an American jurist who served on the Supreme Court of Missouri from 1865 to 1868.

== Early life ==
Holmes' parents were both the children of immigrants, with his father's father being from County Antrim and his mother's father being from Fifeshire. He attended school in Chester, Vermont and New Ipswich, New Hampshire, then was a student at Philips Exeter Academy before enrolling in Harvard University in 1833. After graduating Harvard in 1837, he became a tutor in Maryland, and then a year later enrolled in Harvard Law School.

== Career ==
Holmes began practicing law in St. Louis, Missouri in 1839. In 1846, John C. Edwards appointed him circuit attorney for St. Louis County, a position he held until 1847. From 1853 to 1855, he represented the St. Louis school board, and from 1862 to 1865, he represented the North Missouri Railroad Company.

In 1865, the Ousting Ordinance removed all judges in Missouri from office, and Thomas Clement Fletcher appointed Holmes to fill one of the newly-vacated seats on the state Supreme Court.

In 1867, the University of Missouri appointed him a Professor of Law; however, he did not teach any courses. In 1868, he resigned from the court, and returned to Harvard Law School, where he served as Royall Professor of Law. In 1872, he resigned from Harvard and returned to St. Louis, where he practiced law until 1883, at which point he retired and returned to Cambridge, where he died in 1901.

== Other activities ==
Holmes was an early proponent of the idea that Francis Bacon wrote the works attributed to William Shakespeare, and in 1866 published a 600-page book, The Authorship of Shakespeare, in support of this.
