= Moses Montrose Pallen =

American physician, obstetrician, educator and writer

Moses Montrose Pallen (1810 – September 24, 1876) was an American medical doctor, obstetrician, educator and writer.

== Life and career ==
Born in King and Queen County, Virginia, in 1810, the son of Solomon Pahlen, a Russian emigrant, he was educated at the University of Virginia, Charlottesville and graduated from the University of Maryland, Baltimore's School of Medicine in 1835. Thereafter, he settled in Vicksburg, Mississippi, where he began his medical practice. After seven years, in 1842, he relocated to St. Louis, Missouri, where he was named professor (later chair) of obstetrics and the diseases of women at the St. Louis Medical College, where he founded and served as president of the St. Louis Academy of Science, and for several years was president/curator of the St. Louis Medical Society. During the Mexican–American War, Pallen occupied the position of contracting surgeon at the United States Arsenal at St. Louis, and a little later he was health officer of the city during the cholera epidemic of 1849.

== Family ==
Pallen married Janet Cochran (1814–1884), a daughter of William G. Cochran (died 1815), a Baltimore merchant who had been one of Fort McHenry's defenders during the War of 1812, and his wife, Susanna M. Cochran (née McCannon; died 1850), on April 6, 1835, in Baltimore County, Maryland. Moses and Janet Pallen had six children.

== Death ==
He died on September 24, 1876, in St. Louis, Missouri. The cause of death was recorded as atony of the bowels.

== Sources ==
- The Encyclopedic History of St. Louis
- Transactions of the Academy of Science of Saint Louis, vol. 23
