= Henry Helm Clayton =

American meteorologist and weather forecaster

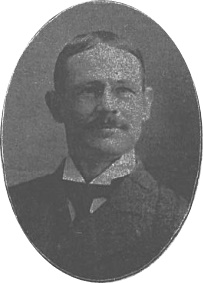
- Born: 1861
- Died: 1946 (aged 84–85)
- Scientific career
- Fields: Meteorology
- Workplaces: University of Michigan; Harvard University's Astronomical Observatory; Harvard's Blue Hill Meteorological Observatory

Henry Helm Clayton (1861–1946) was an American meteorologist and weather forecaster.

== Biography ==
Clayton was born on March 12, 1861, in Murfreesboro, Tennessee. In 1884, he began his career as an assistant at the University of Michigan's Astronomical Observatory. He was appointed as assistant at Harvard University's Astronomical Observatory in 1885. From 1886 to 1891, he served as an observer at Harvard's Blue Hill Meteorological Observatory. Starting from 1891 to 1893, he was working as a local forecast official for United States Weather Bureau. He returned to the Blue Hill Meteorological Observatory in 1894, at which he served as a meteorologist until 1909. In 1913, he became Chief of the forecast division of the Argentine Weather Service. While in Argentina, he met Charles G. Abbot, and started working with him on solar heat changes and the system of weather forecasting. They worked together in the Smithsonian Institution, where he conducted research on solar variation. Beginning from 1923-1926 he researched the effect of solar variation on world weather patterns, with the support from the Smithsonian. He was in charge of the private weather forecasting service and served as a consultant on meteorology for business organizations, beginning from 1920 and onward. He wrote many papers, in which he documents his career and his research, especially his professional correspondence with Charles Abbot. Clayton died in 1946.

== Personal life ==
In 1892, Clayton married Frances Fawn Coman in Athens, Alabama.
