= Cartonnage =

Material used in ancient Egyptian funerary masks

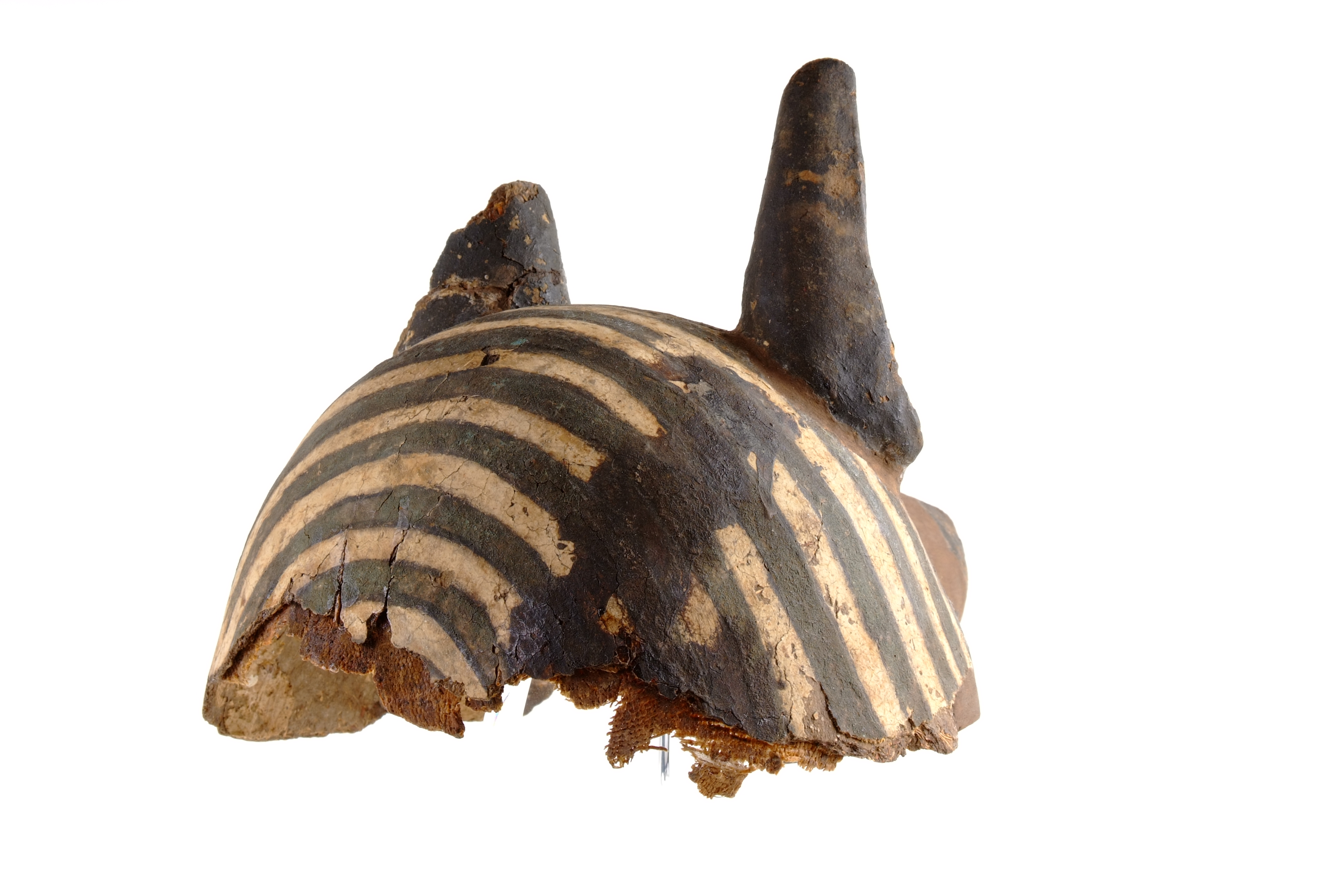
Rear of a cartonnage Anubis mask, Ptolemaic era

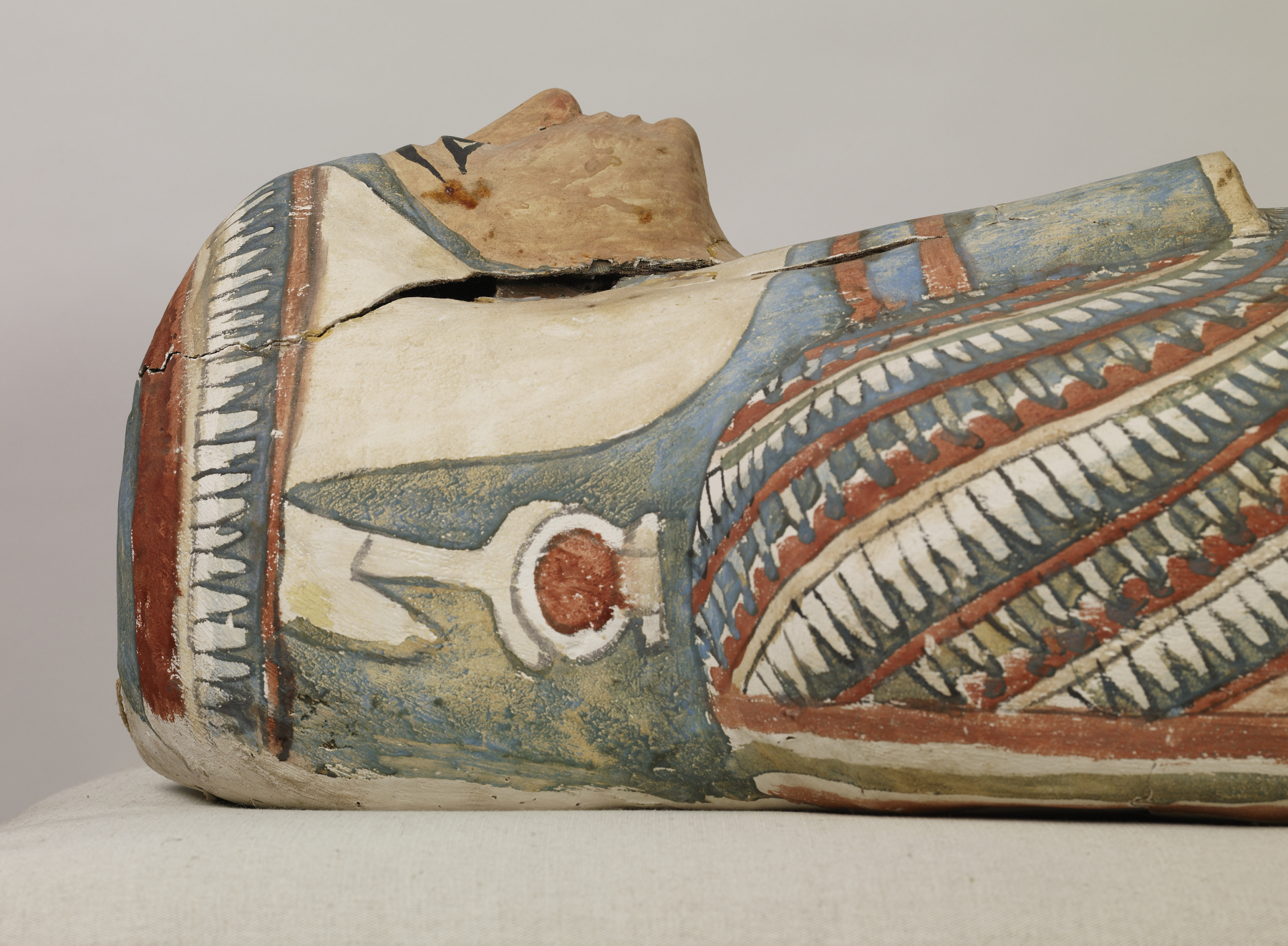
This mummy of an unknown girl has a cartonnage composed of layers of linen and plaster. The Walters Art Museum.

Cartonnage or cartonage is a type of material used in ancient Egyptian funerary masks from the First Intermediate Period to the Roman era. It was made of layers of linen or papyrus covered with plaster. Some of the Fayum mummy portraits are also painted on panels made of cartonnage.

== Technique ==
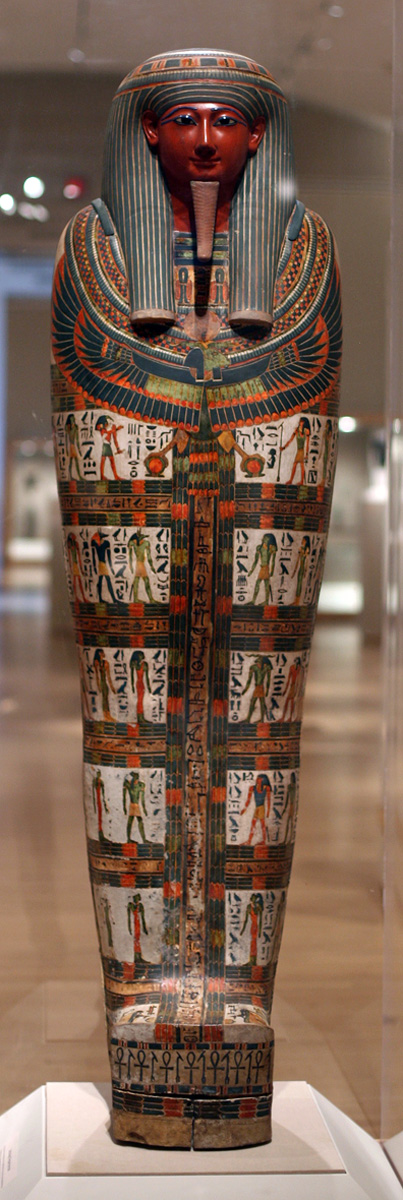
Cartonnage of Nespanetjerenpere, ca. 945–718 BCE. Linen or papyrus mixed with plaster, pigment, glass, lapis lazuli, 69 11/16 in. (177 cm). Brooklyn Museum, 35.1265.

In a technique similar to papier-mâché, scraps of linen or papyrus were stuck together with plaster or resin and used to make mummy cases and masks. It could be molded to the shape of the body, forming a type of shell. After the material dried it could be painted or gilded. The shell could be decorated with geometric shapes, deities, and inscriptions. During the Ptolemaic era, the single shell method was altered to include four to six pieces of cartonnage. There would generally be a mask, pectoral, apron, and foot casing. In certain instances there were two additional pieces used to cover the ribcage and stomach.

== Materials ==
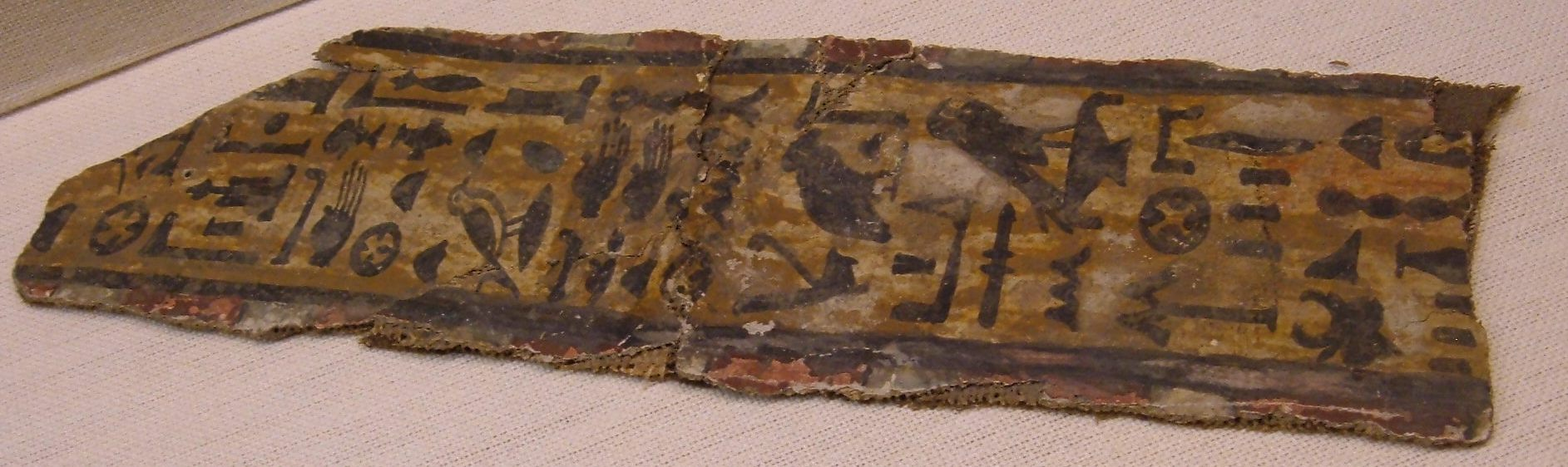
Fragment of cartonnage from a New Kingdom coffin (Rosicrucian Egyptian Museum)

The materials used to produce cartonnage changed over time. In the Middle Kingdom it was common to use plastered linen; during the Third Intermediate Period, linen and stucco; during the Ptolemaic period, old papyrus scrolls; and during the Roman period, thicker fibrous materials.

Reusing papyrus that was considered waste was a common practice during the Ptolemaic period. Many discarded documents from the government and archives were used for this purpose.

== Archeological significance ==
The preparation of cartonnage preserved the sections of papyrus; therefore, it is a prominent source of well-preserved manuscript sections. In 1993, the city of Helsinki received fourteen fragments of cartonnages from the Egyptian Museum of Berlin. Conservators at the University of Helsinki, working with specialists from the University of Michigan, were tasked with preserving the cartonnages and publishing all Greek papyrus texts derived from them.

More recently, advances in digital and metrological analysis have demonstrated that cartonnage also holds significant value for reconstructing archaeological provenance and workshop practices. High-resolution three-dimensional shape analysis has been used to compare fragmentary cartonnage remains with complete funerary masks, allowing researchers to re-identify artefacts with lost provenience and attribute them to specific production traditions or burial contexts. Such approaches show that cartonnage fragments can contribute not only to the study of reused papyri but also to broader questions of funerary manufacture, regional styles, and object circulation in Graeco-Roman Egypt.
