= Kom el-Nana =

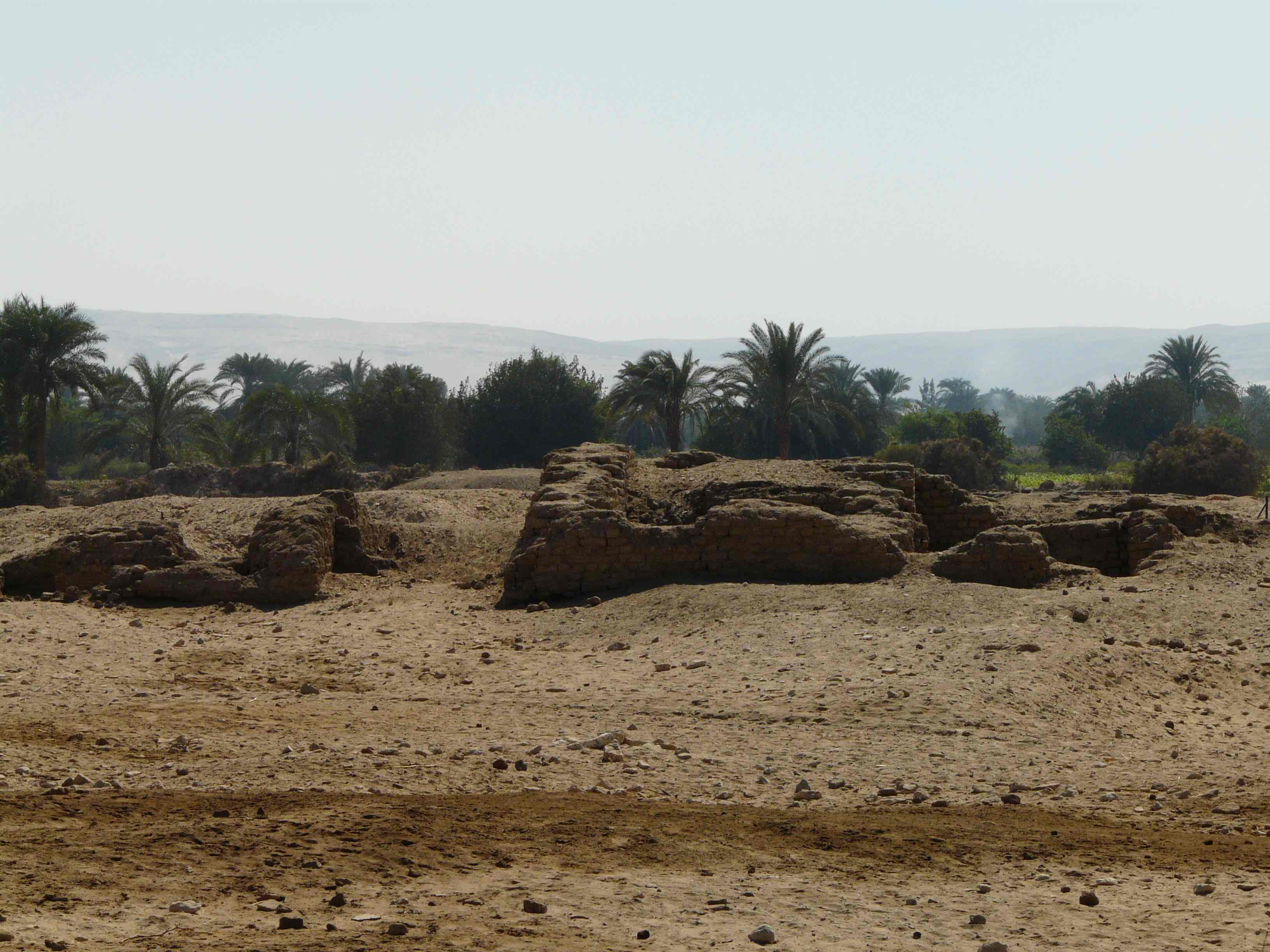
Kom el-Nana

Kom el-Nana is an archaeological site near the ancient Egyptian city of Akhet-Aten. It lies south of the city and east of the modern village of el-Hagg Quandil. For a long time its ruins were thought to be those of a Roman military camp, but between 1988 and 2000 Barry Kemp excavated remains of an Amarna period stone temple with garden and subsidiary buildings including a bakery and a brewery. Neither the original name nor the owner of the complex has been identified. It is likely to have been a sun temple and is very similar to Maru-Aten. It consists of a brick enclosure with an area of 228×213 m; it is divided into two unequal parts by an east-west wall. It is likely that pylon gates opened on all four outer walls. Since it stood at a very prominent place – at the southern end of the so-called Royal Road, the main street of Akhet-Aten – it's possibly identical with the sunshade temple of Nefertiti mentioned on the boundary stelae.

In the northern part of the enclosure brick ovens were found, findings suggest a bakery and brewery. Traces of a building (the "northern shrine") were also found. Most of the northern part was overbuilt by a 5th-6th century Christian monastery that reused the original walls, so the southern part, which was not overbuilt, is better preserved; the following buildings were excavated:

- A stone-floored pylon
- The rectangular Southern Pavilion, surrounded by sunken gardens;
- A central platform with a building including a columned hall and other rooms
- The Southern Shrine, consisting of rooms and a western portico.

In the southeast corner of the southern enclosure stood a group of houses in two sets, with garden plots.
