= Boundary Stelae of Akhenaten =

Group of royal monuments in Upper Egypt

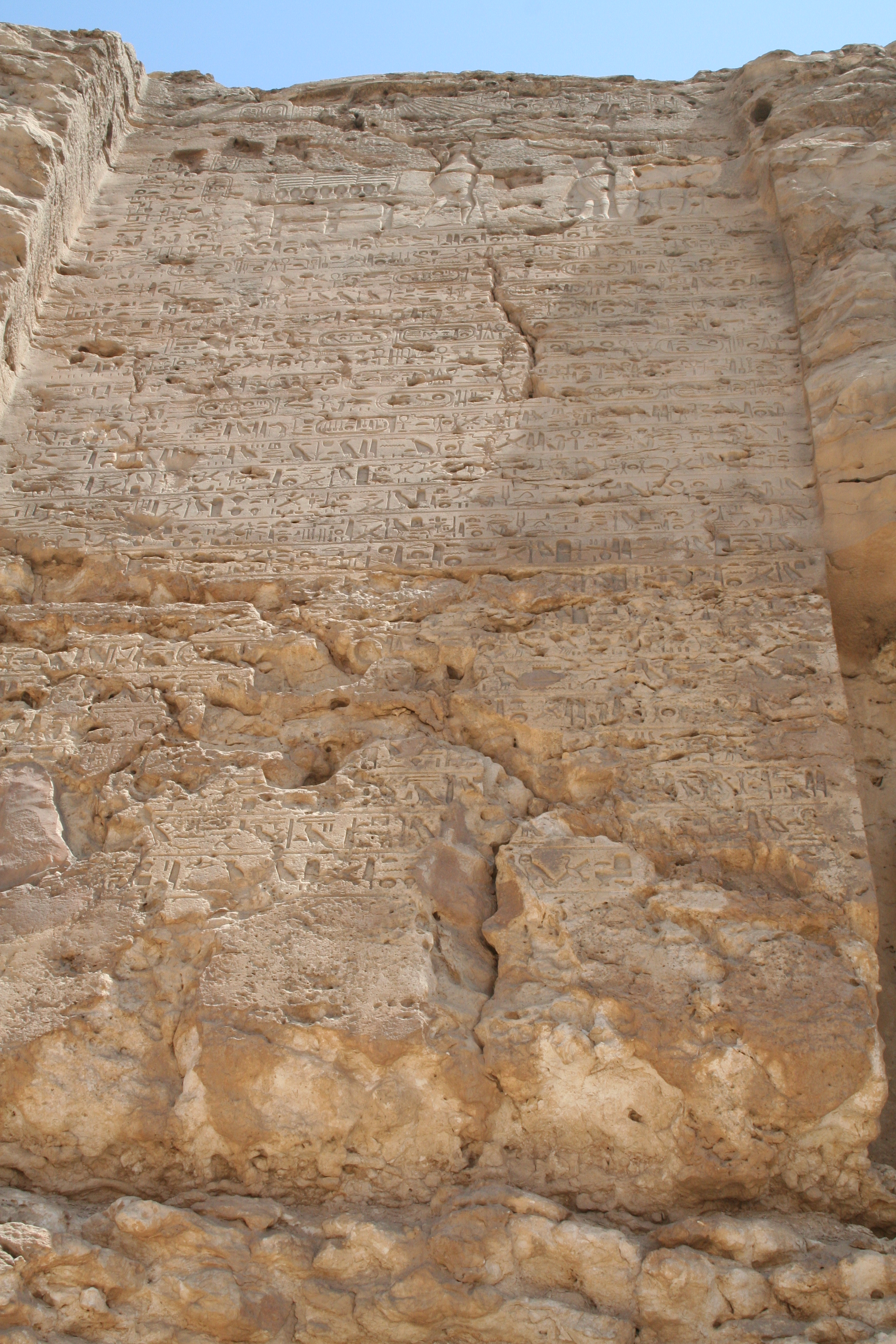
Boundary stela U, Amarna, Egypt.

The Boundary Stelae of Akhenaten are a group of royal monuments in Upper Egypt. They are carved into the cliffs surrounding the area of Akhetaten, or the Horizon of Aten, which demarcates the limits of the site. The Pharaoh Akhenaten commissioned the construction of Akhetaten in year five of his reign during the New Kingdom. It served as a sacred space for the god Aten in an uninhabited location roughly halfway between Memphis and Thebes at today's Tell El-Amarna. The boundary stelae include the foundation decree of Akhetaten along with later additions to the text, which delineate the boundaries and describe the purpose of the site and its founding by the Pharaoh. Total of sixteen stelae have been discovered around the area. According to Barry Kemp, the Pharaoh Akhenaten did not “conceive of Akhetaten as a city, but as a tract of sacred land”.

== Discovery and publication ==
Sixteen boundary stelae have so far been discovered at Tell El-Amarna. The French Jesuit Claude Sicard was the first European to call attention to the stelae. He published a sketch of Stela A and a description of the site after visiting it in 1714. Stela U was discovered by A. C. Harris and George Gliddon in 1840 and, also in the early 1840s, another stela was discovered by George Lloyd of Brynestyn. Lloyd made a copy of Stela P, which was published along with a new copy of Stela A and a copy of Stela U made by Émile Prisse d'Avennes. Prisse was the first one to realize, based on the inscriptions on the stelae, that there must be at least six stelae that demarcate the area of the site. In 1843 and 1845, Karl Richard Lepsius travelled to the site with a Prussian expedition and discovered four new stelae, later named stelae K, M, N, and R. The practice of referring to the stelae with a discontinuous series of letters, in order to leave space for possible further discoveries, was begun by W. M. Flinders Petrie whose survey of Amarna was published in 1894. In 1892, Petrie found six new stelae at the site: stelae B and F on the western side of the Nile River, and stelae J, L, P, and V on the eastern side. From the previously found stelae, only Stela A is located in the western side. In 1893, Percy E. Newberry found Stela Q on the east bank. Jean Daressy published the earliest printed translation of the legible parts of the text, also in 1893, based on copies of stelae S and R, using variants found on stelae A and U. In 1898, stelae J, K, M, N, Q, R, S, and U were copied by Georg Steindorff who also photographed the sites of the stelae and took some loose fragments with him to Germany. Steindorff subsequently made his materials available for the Egypt Exploration Fund. In 1901, Norman de Garis Davies was shown the northernmost stela on the east bank, which led him to include the boundary stelae in his publication of the Rock Tombs of El Amarna in 1908. Davies's publication included a translation of the two different sets of stelae, which Davies named the “Earlier Proclamation” and the “Later Proclamation”, as well as of the texts that were added to the stelae bearing the Later Proclamation in the year eight of Akhenaten's reign. The latest addition to stelae A and B was termed the “Colophon” by Davies. A partial translation of the stelae had also appeared in James Henry Breasted’s Ancient Records published in 1906. An additional stela was discovered by the archeological survey of the Egypt Exploration Society in the season 2005-2006 and it was labeled Stela H.

== Earlier Proclamation ==
Stelae K, M, and X on the east side of the Nile contain what Davies termed the Earlier Proclamation. All three stelae contain both vertical and horizontal lines of text. Stela K is the best preserved and was made to replace Stela M which was damaged early on, thus necessitating a replacement. Both Stela K and Stela M are located in the southern side of the site and the text in their horizontal lines reads from left to right, away from the center of the site. Stela X is located in the northern side of the site and it is a mirror image of stelae K and M in that its horizontal lines read from right to left, also away from the center. The inscription on the stelae K, M, and X is dated to the fifth regnal year of Akhenaten in day 13 of the season of Peret. They include the full title of the god Aten, as well as titles of the king Akhenaten and the king's wife Nefertiti. The stelae also describe the founding of the site by the pharaoh, reasons for choosing it, the proposed layout of the site, instructions regarding the burials of the royal family and certain notables, and instructions for the maintenance of the cult of Aten. The Earlier Proclamation also includes a promise from Akhenaten to build various temples and other structures to the god Aten in the location. The latter part of the text is fragmentary and has inspired a variety of interpretations.

== Later Proclamation ==
What Davies termed the Later Proclamation was carved on stelae J, N, P, Q, R, S, U, and V on the eastern side of the Nile, and on stelae A, B, and F on the western side. The inscription of the Later Proclamation is dated to year six of Akhenaten's reign in the day 13 of the season of Peret, which corresponds with the one year anniversary of the Earlier Proclamation, and includes a “renewal of the oath” that appeared in the Earlier Proclamation regarding the location and permanence of the site, with some modifications to include more land, especially a swath of agricultural land in the cultivation on the western side of the river. Titulary of the god Aten is also given, along with a repetition of much of the Earlier Proclamation. The Later Proclamation includes a description of events that took place after the inscription of the Earlier Proclamation, such as a journey of the pharaoh to the southeastern crag of the site. The Later Proclamation also mentions six principal boundary stelae that delimit the site.

== Repetition of the Oath and the Colophon ==
Early in the year eight of Akhenaten's reign, in the season of Peret, a repetition of the oath of Akhenaten regarding the site is added to the stelae furnished with the Later Proclamation, and later that same year, in the season of Akhet, another text, termed the “Colophon” by Davies, is added to stelae A and B. The Colophon contains a reaffirmation of the borders and Aten's ownership of the site.

== Stela L ==
Stela L was found in 1892 by Petrie and is located about seven meters south from Stela M. The stela is different from the rest of the stelae in its small size and is badly weathered. Davies did not include Stela L among the boundary stelae due to its dissimilarity with the other stelae.

== Purpose of the Stelae ==
The boundary stelae of Akhenaten were carved in locations around the city of Akhetaten that was built by the pharaoh Akhenaten to his god Aten. Their purpose is to demarcate the boundaries of the holy site of Aten, but also to inform people about the intentions of the pharaoh and the nature of the site as a holy place for Aten. The boundary stelae are a major source of information about the religious reforms of Akhenaten, as they include the full titulary of the god Aten and other clues about the cult practiced in Akhetaten. The stelae are royal monuments commissioned by the pharaoh and thus contain an inherent bias that favors the king's undertakings and condemns those who opposed his reforms. They are nonetheless important historical artefacts and are very useful to historians.

== Scholarly arguments ==
Stelae X, M, and K have an image carved on top of the text, showing Akhenaten and Nefertiti worshipping Aten with their daughter Meritaten. Their second daughter Meketaten was later added to the picture in stela K, which is taken to signal that her birth must have taken place sometime after year five of Akhenaten's reign, to which year the Earlier Proclamation is dated. Another unnamed figure was also later added to Stela K, while Stela X, and probably also the damaged Stela M, included only Meketaten and her parents. The text of the Earlier Proclamation only mentions Meketaten and not her younger sisters. The stelae that have the Later Proclamation inscribed on them are more elaborate than the earlier ones and include rock-cut statues of the king and his wife, as well as two of their daughters, suggesting that the second daughter was born by the time these stelae were carved in the year six of Akhenaten. In addition to the second daughter that was added to Stela K, a third daughter is added to stelae A, B, P, Q, and U, which all have the Later Proclamation inscribed on them and are thus dated to year six or later of Akhenaten's reign. This has led Murnane and Van Siclen to conclude that only Meritaten had already been born by year five, while her younger sister Meketaten was most likely born during year five or six and the third princess Ankhesenpaaten toward the end of year six at the earliest, but most likely sometime in year seven or eight before the completion of the later stelae.

Due to the fragmented part of the Earlier Proclamation making a mention of some unsavory things the pharaoh had heard at Thebes, a theory that posits a clash with the priesthood of Amun of Thebes has been put forward by scholars. Barry Kemp argues that the full expression of the beliefs of Akhenaten “demanded the creation of a physical sacred landscape” and that the boundary stelae are “the most extensive personal testimony we have as to what was in his mind”.

== Stelae no longer In Situ ==
At least nine of the stelae have been damaged by thieves and one, Stela F, has disappeared altogether. Two others, stelae P and Q, have also been virtually destroyed.

== The Titulary of Aten ==
The full title of the god Aten in the Earlier Proclamation is: “the Good God, who rejoices [in Ma’at], Lord of Heaven, Lord of [earth]; the [great living] o[rb who illumi]nates the two banks; (my [?]) Father, The Aten; the great living orb who is in jubilee within the [house] of the Orb in ‘Horizon of the Orb’”.

The title as given in the Later Proclamation is slightly different and reads: “the Good God who is content with Ma’at, the lord of heaven, the lord of earth, the great living orb who illuminates the Two Banks. Live the (divine, royal) Father, The Aten, given life everlastingly forever, the great living orb who is in jubilee within the estate of the orb in ‘Horizon of the Orb’”.
