= Amarna =

Akhenaten's capital of Egypt, 1346–1332 BC

- العمارنة
- El-Amarna, Tell el-Amarna
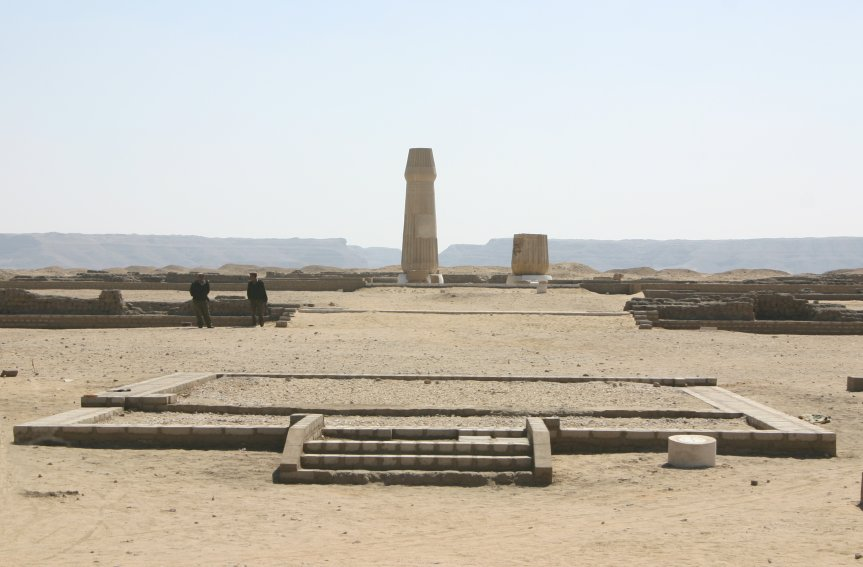
- The Small Aten Temple at Akhetaten

- Location within Egypt
- 27°38′43″N 30°53′47″E
- Type: Settlement
- Periods: Eighteenth Dynasty of Egypt, New Kingdom
- Location: Minya Governorate, Egypt
- Region: Upper Egypt

History
- Built: Approximately 1346 BC
- Built by: Akhenaten

Site notes
- Excavation dates: 1891-1892, 1907-1914, 1923-1925, 1930-1932, 1977-1982, 1996-present
- Archaeologists: Flinders Petrie, Alessandro Barsanti, Ludwig Borchardt, T.E. Peet, Leonard Woolley, Henri Frankfort, John Pendlebury, Barry J. Kemp

Amarna (/əˈmɑːrnə/; Arabic: العمارنة, romanized: al-ʿAmārna) is an extensive ancient Egyptian archaeological site containing the ruins of Akhetaten (Ancient Egyptian: 𓈌𓐰𓏏𓐱𓉐𓇋𓏏𓐰𓈖𓐰𓇳, romanized: ꜣḫt-jtn), the capital city during the late Eighteenth Dynasty.

The city was established in 1346 BC, built at the direction of the Pharaoh Akhenaten, and abandoned shortly after his death in 1332 BC. The site is on the east bank of the Nile River, In the modern Egyptian province of Minya. It is about 58 km (36 mi) south of the city of al-Minya, 312 km (194 mi) south of the Egyptian capital, Cairo, and 402 km (250 mi) north of Luxor (site of the previous capital, Thebes). The city of Deir Mawas lies directly to its west. On the east side of Amarna there are several modern villages, the chief of which are l-Till in the north and el-Hagg Qandil in the south.

Activity in the region flourished from the Amarna Period until the later Roman era.

== Origin ==
The name Amarna comes from the Beni Amran, an Arab tribe that settled the area before the 18th century. The ancient Egyptian name Akhetaten means "the horizon of the Aten".

English Egyptologist Sir John Gardner Wilkinson visited Amarna twice in the 1820s and identified it as Alabastron, following the sometimes contradictory descriptions of Roman-era authors Pliny (On Stones) and Ptolemy (Geography), although he was not sure about the identification and suggested Kom el-Ahmar as an alternative location.

== City of Akhetaten ==
=== Founding of new capital city ===
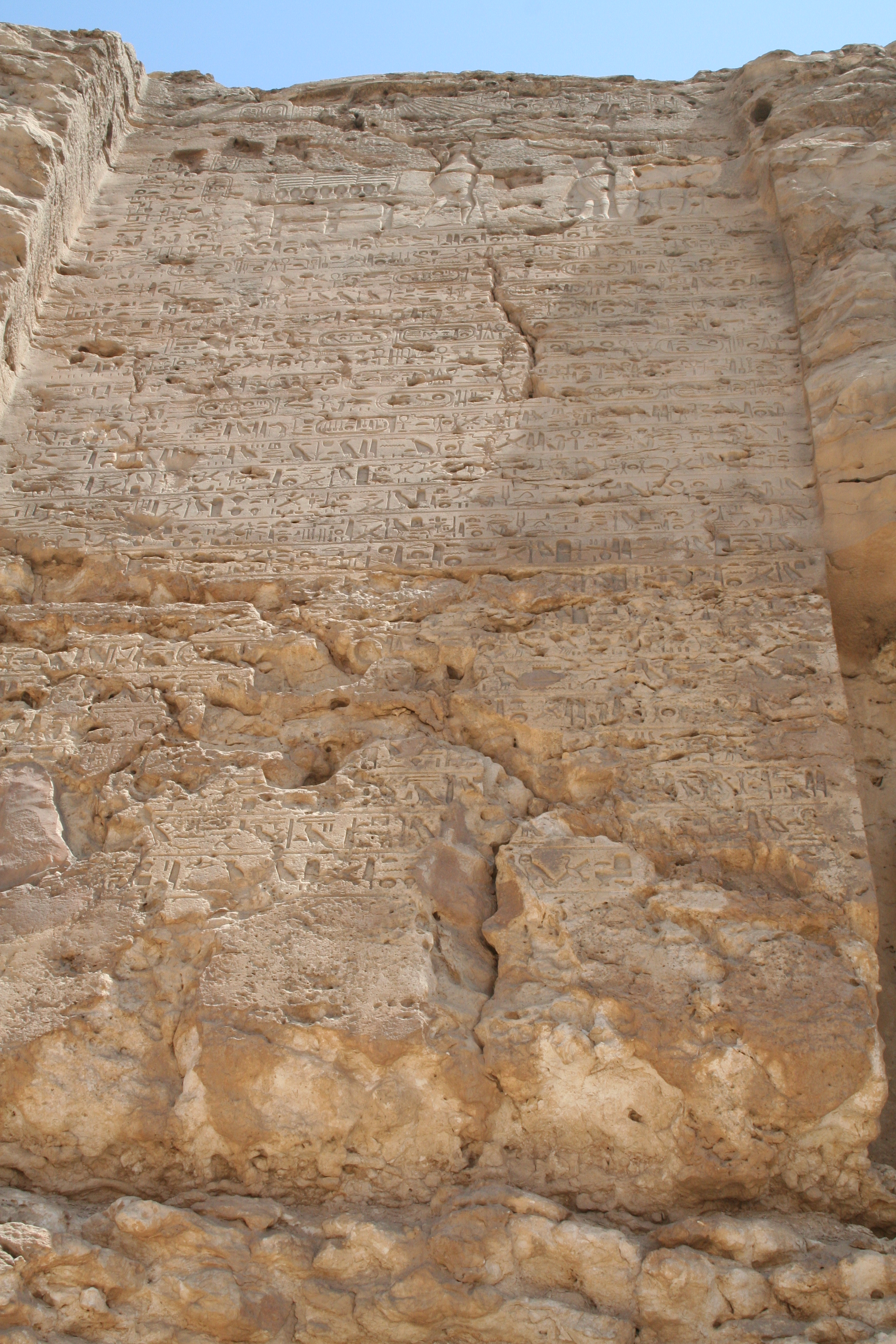
One of the stele marking the boundary of the new capital Akhetaten

Around the same time he changed his royal titulary, on the thirteenth day of the growing season's fourth month, Akhenaten decreed that a new capital city be built: Akhetaten (Ancient Egyptian: ꜣḫt-jtn, meaning "Horizon of the Aten"), the city known today as Amarna.

The events that Egyptologists know the most about during Akhenaten's life are connected with founding Akhetaten, as several so-called boundary stelae were found around the city to mark its boundary. The pharaoh chose a site about halfway between Thebes, the capital at the time, and Memphis, on the east bank of the Nile, where a wadi and a natural dip in the surrounding cliffs form a silhouette similar to the "horizon" hieroglyph. Additionally, the site had previously been uninhabited. According to inscriptions on one boundary stela, the site was appropriate for Aten's city for "not being the property of a god, nor being the property of a goddess, nor being the property of a ruler, nor being the property of a female ruler, nor being the property of any people able to lay claim to it."

Historians do not know for certain why Akhenaten established a new capital and left Thebes, the old capital. The boundary stelae detailing Akhetaten's founding is damaged where it likely explained the pharaoh's motives for the move. Surviving parts claim what happened to Akhenaten was "worse than those that I heard" previously in his reign and worse than those "heard by any kings who assumed the White Crown", and alludes to "offensive" speech against the Aten. Egyptologists believe that Akhenaten could be referring to conflict with the priesthood and followers of Amun, the patron god of Thebes. The great temples of Amun, such as Karnak, were all located in Thebes and the priests there achieved significant power earlier in the Eighteenth Dynasty, especially under Hatshepsut and Thutmose III, thanks to pharaohs offering large amounts of Egypt's growing wealth to the cult of Amun; historians, such as Donald B. Redford, therefore posited that by moving to a new capital, Akhenaten may have been trying to break with Amun's priests and the god.

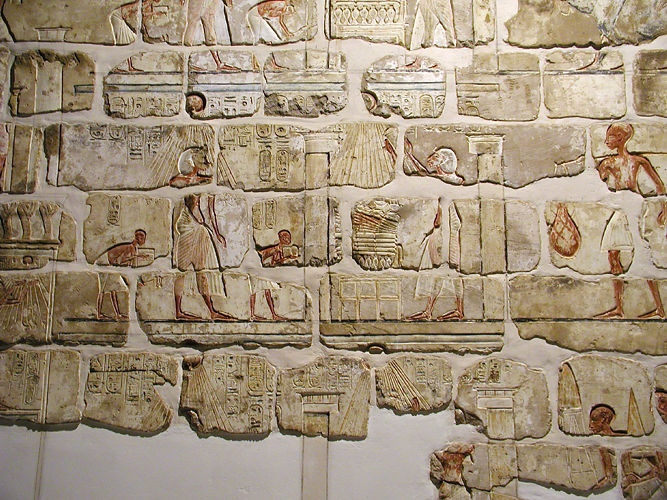
Talatat blocks from Akhenaten's Aten temple in Karnak

Akhetaten was a planned city with the Great Temple of the Aten, Small Aten Temple, royal residences, records office, and government buildings in the city center. Some of these buildings, such as the Aten temples, were ordered to be built by Akhenaten on the boundary stela decreeing the city's founding.

The city was built quickly, thanks to a new construction method that used substantially smaller building blocks than under previous pharaohs. These blocks, called talatats, measured 1/2 by 1/2 by 1 ancient Egyptian cubits (c. 27 by 27 by 54 cm), and because of the smaller weight and standardized size, using them during constructions was more efficient than using heavy building blocks of varying sizes. By regnal year eight, Akhetaten reached a state where it could be occupied by the royal family. Only his most loyal subjects followed Akhenaten and his family to the new city. While the city continued to be built, in years five through eight, construction work began to stop in Thebes. The Theban Aten temples that had begun were abandoned, and a village of those working on Valley of the Kings tombs was relocated to the workers' village at Akhetaten. However, construction work continued in the rest of the country, as larger cult centers, such as Heliopolis and Memphis, also had temples built for Aten.

=== Background ===
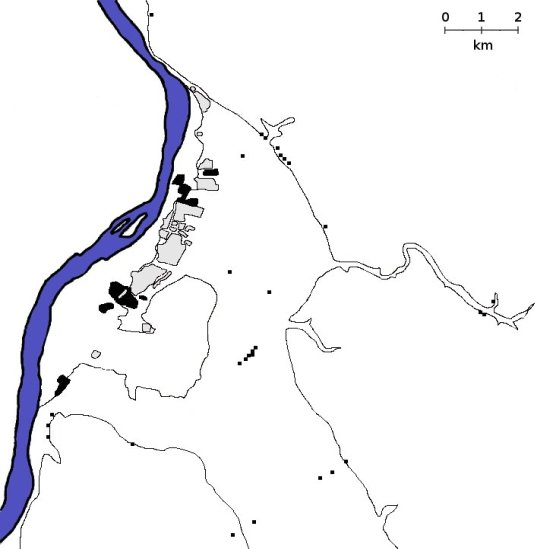

The area of the city was effectively a virgin site, and it was this city that Akhenaten described as the Aten's "seat of the First Occasion, which he had made for himself that he might rest in it".

It may be that the Royal Wadi's resemblance to the hieroglyph for horizon showed that this was the place to found the city.

The city was built as the new capital of the Pharaoh Akhenaten, dedicated to his new religion of worship to the Aten. Construction started in or around Year 5 of his reign (1346 BC) and was probably completed by Year 9 (1341 BC), although it became the capital city two years earlier. To speed up construction of the city most of the buildings were constructed out of mudbrick, and white washed. The most important buildings were faced with local stone.

It is the only ancient Egyptian city which preserves great details of its internal plan in large part because it was abandoned almost completely shortly after the royal government of Tutankhamun quit the city in favor of Thebes (modern Luxor). The city remained active for a decade or so after his death, and a shrine to Horemheb indicates that it was at least partially occupied at the beginning of his reign, if only as a source for building material elsewhere. Once it was abandoned, it remained uninhabited until Roman settlement began along the edge of the Nile. However, due to the unique circumstances of its creation and abandonment, it is questionable how representative of ancient Egyptian cities it actually is. Amarna was hastily constructed and covered an area of approximately 8 miles (13 km) of territory on the east bank of the Nile River; on the west bank, land was set aside to provide crops for the city's population. The entire city is encircled with a total of 14 boundary stelae (labeled A thru V with discontinuities left for those thought to be missing, Stele B was defaced by locals in 1885) detailing Akhenaten's conditions for the establishment of this new capital city of Egypt.

The earliest dated stele from Akhenaten's new city is known to be Boundary stele K which is dated to Year 5, IV Peret (or month 8), day 13 of Akhenaten's reign. (Most of the original 14 boundary stelae have been badly eroded.) It preserves an account of Akhenaten's foundation of this city. The document records the pharaoh's wish to have several temples of the Aten to be erected here, for several royal tombs to be created in the eastern hills of Amarna for himself, his chief wife Nefertiti, and his eldest daughter Meritaten as well as his explicit command that when he was dead, he would be brought back to Amarna for burial. Boundary stela K introduces a description of the events that were being celebrated at Amarna:

His Majesty mounted a great chariot of electrum, like the Aten when He rises on the horizon and fills the land with His love, and took a goodly road to Akhetaten, the place of origin, which [the Aten] had created for Himself that he might be happy therein. It was His son Wa'enrē [i.e. Akhenaten] who founded it for Him as His monument when His Father commanded him to make it. Heaven was joyful, the earth was glad every heart was filled with delight when they beheld him.

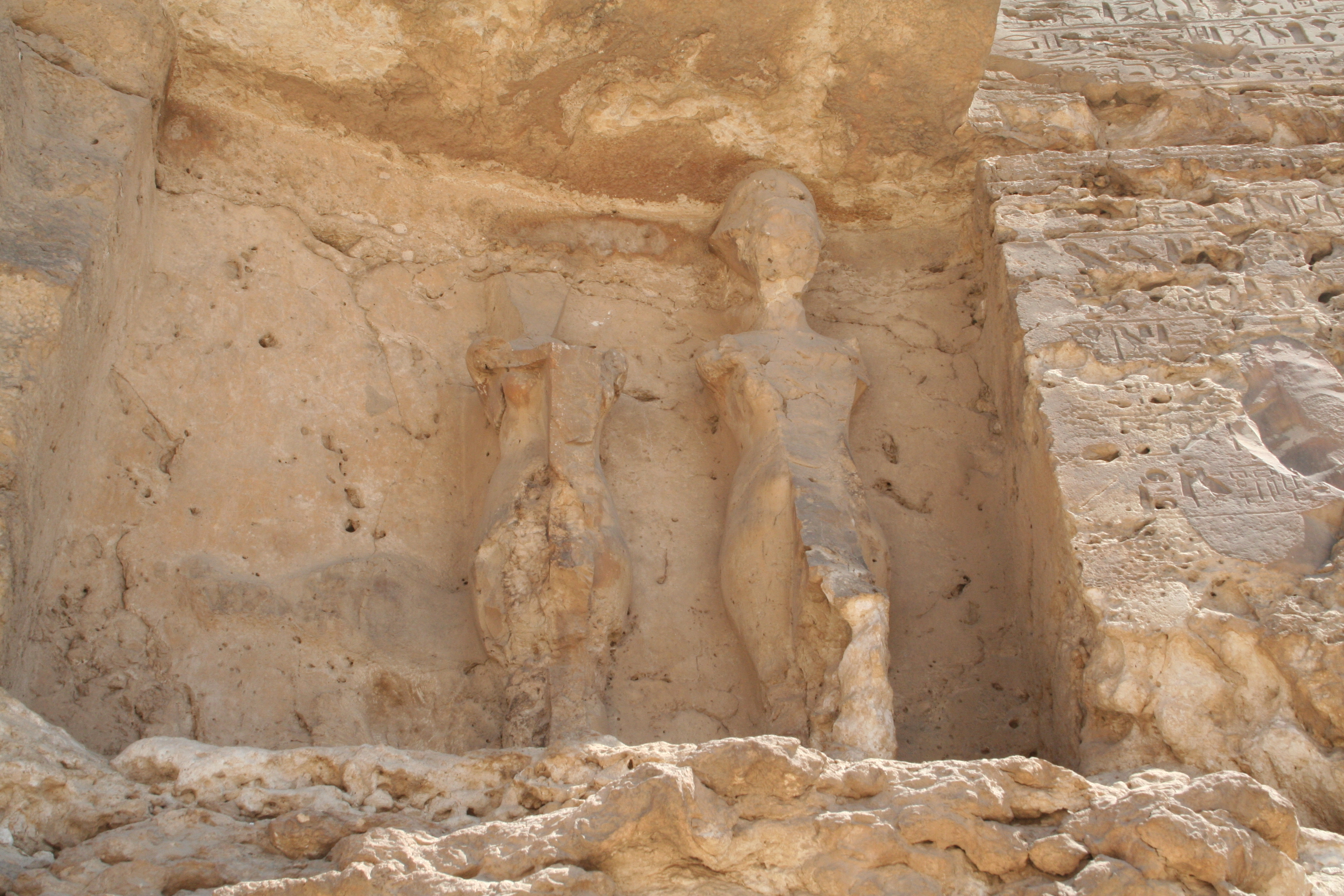
Statues to the left of Boundary stela U in el-Amarna

This text then goes on to state that Akhenaten made a great oblation to the god Aten "and this is the theme [of the occasion] which is illustrated in the lunettes of the stelae where he stands with his queen and eldest daughter before an altar heaped with offerings under the Aten, while it shines upon him rejuvenating his body with its rays."

== Site and plan ==
Located on the east bank of the Nile, the ruins of the city are laid out roughly north to south along a "Royal Road", now referred to as "Sikhet es-Sultan". The Royal residences are generally to the north, in what is known as the North City, with a central administration and religious area and the south of the city is made up of residential suburbs.

=== Major features and central area ===
Most of the important ceremonial and administrative buildings were located in the central area of the city. Here the Great Temple of the Aten and the Small Aten Temple were used for religious functions and between these the Great Royal Palace and Royal Residence were the ceremonial residence of the king and royal family, and were linked by a bridge or ramp. Located behind the Royal Residence was the Bureau of Correspondence of Pharaoh, where the Amarna Letters were found.

This area was probably the first area to be completed, and had at least two phases of construction.

Surrounding the city and marking its extent, the Boundary Stelae (each a rectangle of carved rock on the cliffs on both sides of the Nile) describing the founding of the city are a primary source of information about it.

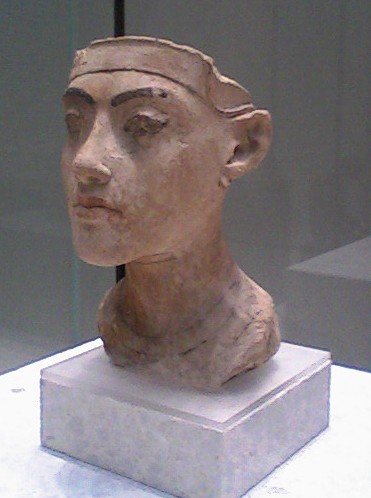
Tutankamun Amarna portrait. Altes Museum, Berlin

Away from the city, Akhenaten's Royal necropolis was started in a narrow valley to the east of the city, hidden in the cliffs. Only one tomb was completed, and was used by an unnamed Royal Wife, and Akhenaten's tomb was hastily used to hold him and likely Meketaten, his second daughter.

In the cliffs to the north and south of the Royal Wadi, the nobles of the city constructed their Tombs.

=== North City ===
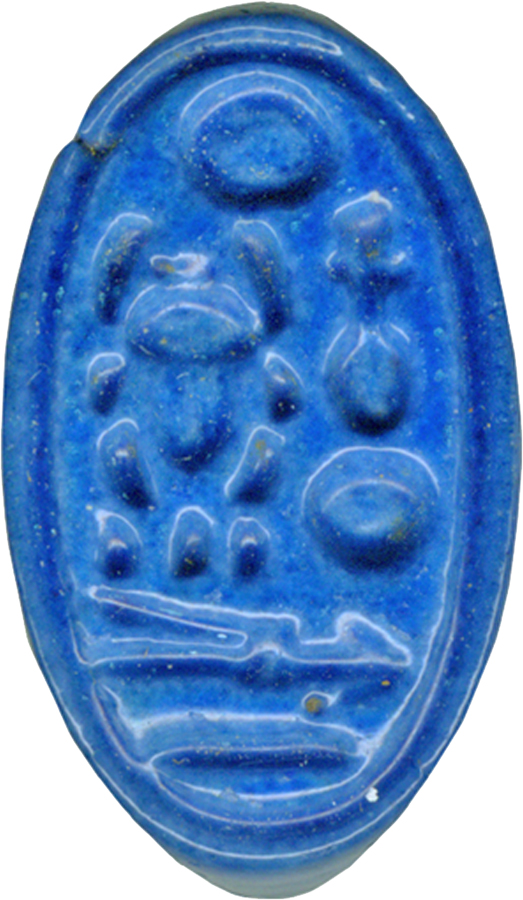
Akhenaten seal ring in blue faience. Walters Art Museum

If one approached the city of Amarna from the north by river the first buildings past the northern boundary stele would be the North Riverside Palace. This building ran all the way up to the waterfront and was likely the main residence of the royal family. Located within the North City area is the Northern Palace, the main residence of the royal family. Between this and the central city, the Northern Suburb was initially a prosperous area with large houses, but the house size decreased and became poorer the further from the road they were.

The North City was an administrative area. It contains the ruins of royal palaces, especially the Northern Palace and other administrative buildings and occupies an area between the river and the cliffs that terminate the plains to the north of the city itself.

=== Southern suburbs ===
To the south of the city was the area now referred to as the Southern Suburbs. It contained the estates of many of the city's powerful nobles, including Nakhtpaaten (Chief Minister), Ranefer, Panehesy (High Priest of the Aten), and Ramose (Master of Horses). This area also held the studio of the sculptor Thutmose, where the famous bust of Nefertiti was found in 1912.

Further to the south of the city was Kom el-Nana, an enclosure, usually referred to as a sun-shade, and was probably built as a sun-temple., and then the Maru-Aten, which was a palace or sun-temple originally thought to have been constructed for Akhenaten's queen Kiya, but on her death her name and images were altered to those of Meritaten, his daughter.

=== Workmen's Village ===
The Workmen's Village located in the desert 1.2 kilometres (0.75 mi) east of the city, housed the workers who constructed and decorated the tombs of the city's elite, making it comparable to the better studied Theban workers village of Deir el-Medina. Though an isolated part of Amarna, the Workmen's Village provides many well preserved artifacts and buildings allowing archaeologists to gather much information about how society functioned.

== Life in ancient Amarna/Akhetaten ==
Much of what is known about Amarna's founding is due to the preservation of a series of official boundary stelae (13 are known) ringing the perimeter of the city. These are cut into the cliffs on both sides of the Nile (10 on the east, 3 on the west) and record the events of Akhetaten (Amarna) from founding to just before its fall.

To make the move from Thebes to Amarna, Akhenaten needed the support of the military. Ay, one of Akhenaten's principal advisors, exercised great influence in this area because his father Yuya had been an important military leader. Additionally, everyone in the military had grown up together; they had been a part of the richest and most successful period in Egypt's history under Akhenaten's father, so loyalty among the ranks was strong and unwavering. Perhaps most importantly, "it was a military whose massed ranks the king took every opportunity to celebrate in temple reliefs, first at Thebes and later at Amarna."

=== Religious life ===
While the reforms of Akhenaten are generally believed to have been oriented towards a sort of monotheism, or perhaps more accurately, monolatrism; archaeological evidence shows other deities were also revered, even at the centre of the Aten cult – if not officially, then at least by the people who lived and worked there.

... at Akhetaten itself, recent excavation by Kemp (2008: 41–46) has shown the presence of objects that depict gods, goddesses and symbols that belong to the traditional field of personal belief. So many examples of Bes, the grotesque dwarf figure who warded off evil spirits, have been found, as well as of the goddess-monster, Taweret, part crocodile, part hippopotamus, who was associated with childbirth. Also in the royal workmen's village at Akhetaten, stelae dedicated to Isis and Shed have been discovered (Watterson 1984: 158 & 208).

== The Amarna letters ==
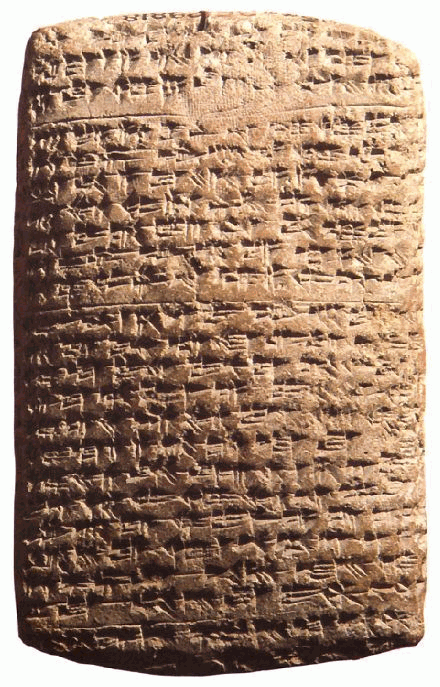
One of the Amarna letters

In 1887, a local woman digging for sebakh uncovered a cache of over 300 cuneiform tablets (now commonly known as the Amarna Letters). These tablets recorded select diplomatic correspondence of the Pharaoh and were predominantly written in Akkadian, the lingua franca commonly used during the Late Bronze Age of the Ancient Near East for such communication. This discovery led to the recognition of the importance of the site, and led to a further increase in exploration.

== Amarna art-style ==
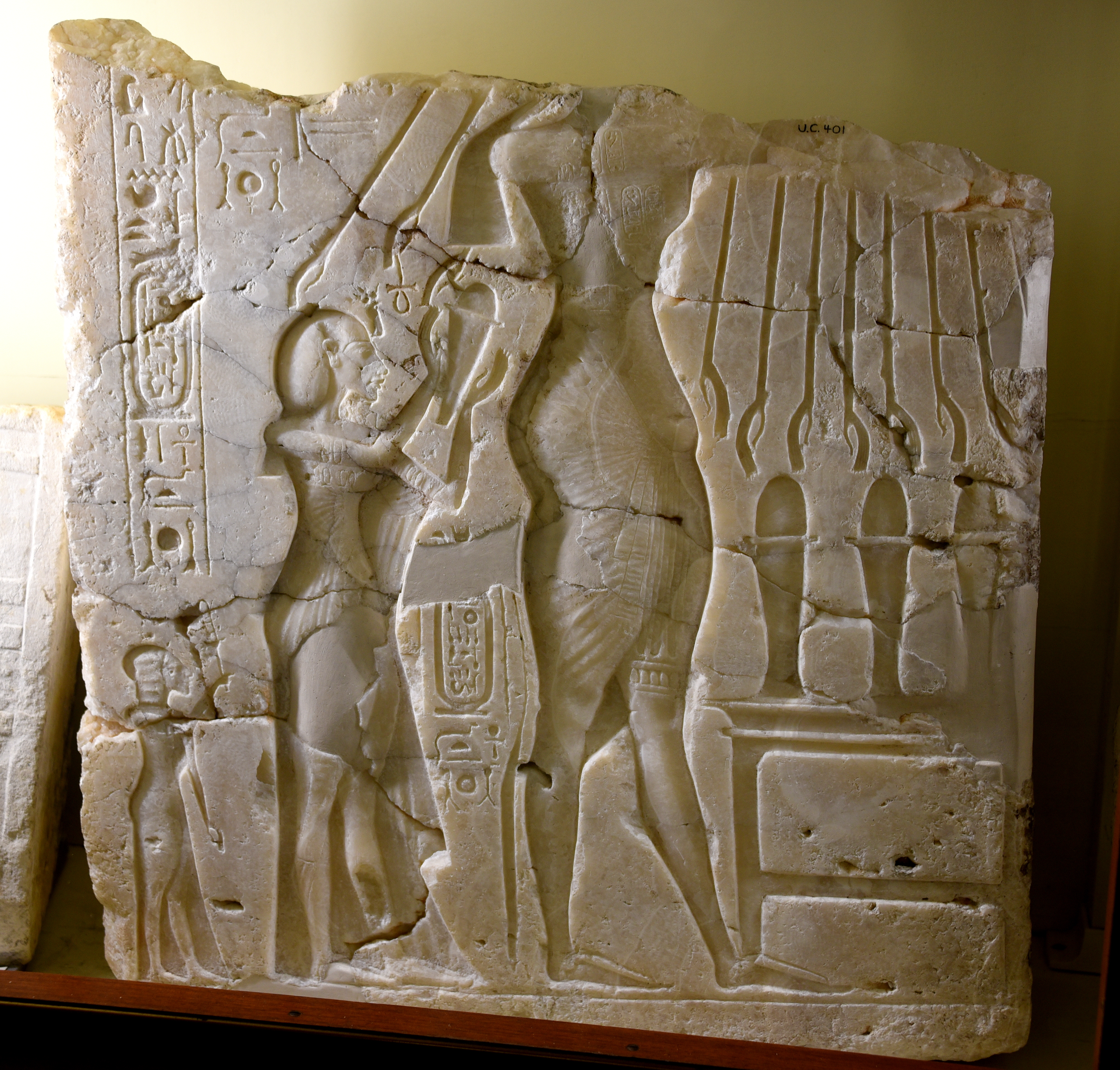
Alabaster sunken relief depicting Akhenaten, Nefertiti, and daughter Meritaten. Early Aten cartouches on king's arm and chest. From Amarna, Egypt. 18th Dynasty. The Petrie Museum of Egyptian Archaeology, London

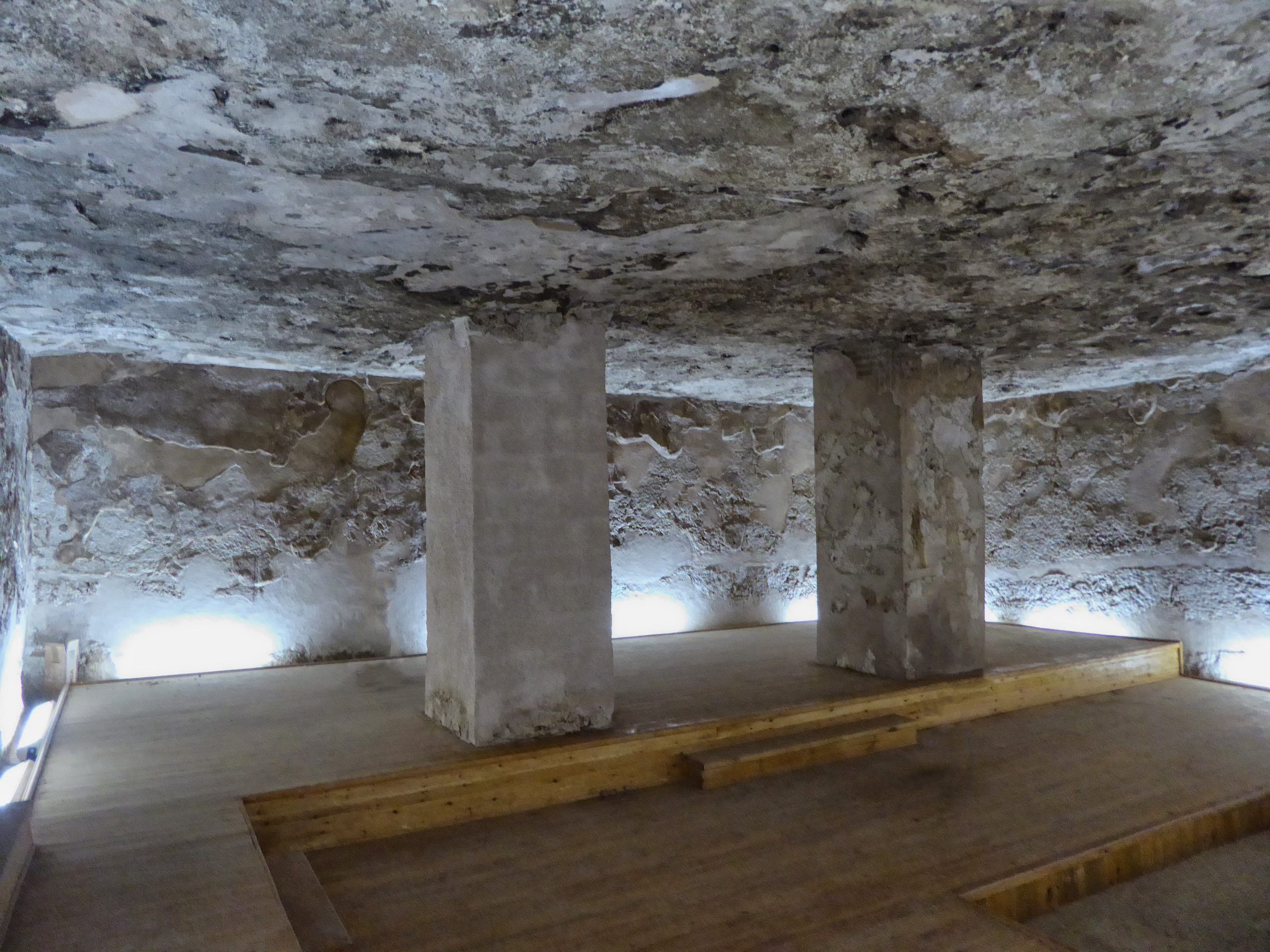
Akhenaten's Royal tomb chamber in Amarna

The Amarna art-style broke with long-established Egyptian conventions. Unlike the strict idealistic formalism of previous Egyptian art, it depicted its subjects more realistically. These included informal scenes, such as intimate portrayals of affection within the royal family or playing with their children, and no longer portrayed women as lighter coloured than men. The art also had a realism that sometimes borders on caricature.

While the worship of Aten was later referred to as the Amarna heresy and suppressed, this art had a more lasting legacy.

== Archaeology ==
The first western mention of the city was made in 1714 by Claude Sicard, a French Jesuit priest who was travelling through the Nile Valley who described the site and made a crude sketch of Stela A. The site was visited by Napoleon's corps de savants in 1798–1799, who prepared the first detailed map of Amarna, which was subsequently published in Description de l'Égypte between 1821 and 1830.

After this European exploration continued in 1824 when Sir John Gardiner Wilkinson explored and mapped the city remains. The copyist Robert Hay and his surveyor G. Laver visited the locality and uncovered several of the Southern Tombs from sand drifts, recording the reliefs in 1833. The copies made by Hay and Laver languish largely unpublished in the British Library, where an ongoing project to identify their locations is underway.

The Prussian expedition led by Richard Lepsius visited the site in 1843 and 1845, and recorded the visible monuments and topography of Amarna in two separate visits over a total of twelve days, using drawings and paper squeezes. The results included an improved map of the city. Despite being somewhat limited in accuracy, the engraved Denkmäler plates formed the basis for scholastic knowledge and interpretation of many of the scenes and inscriptions in the private tombs and some of the Boundary Stelae for the rest of the century. The records made by these early explorers teams are of immense importance since many of these remains were later destroyed or otherwise lost.

Between 1891 and 1892 Alessandro Barsanti and Urbain Bouriant partly cleared the robbed out king's tomb. In 1891 and 1892 Sir Flinders Petrie worked for one season at Amarna, working independently of the Egypt Exploration Fund. He excavated primarily in the Central City, investigating the Great Temple of the Aten, the Great Official Palace, the King's House, the Bureau of Correspondence of Pharaoh, and several private houses. Although frequently amounting to little more than a sondage, Petrie's excavations revealed additional cuneiform tablets, the remains of several glass factories, and a great quantity of discarded faience, glass, and ceramic in sifting the palace rubbish heaps (including Mycenaean sherds). By publishing his results and reconstructions rapidly, Petrie was able to stimulate further interest in the site's potential.

=== Modern excavations ===
The copyist and artist Norman de Garis Davies published drawn and photographic descriptions of private tombs and boundary stelae from Amarna from 1903 to 1908.

From 1907 until 1914 the Deutsche Orientgesellschaft expedition, led by Ludwig Borchardt, worked extensively throughout the North and South suburbs of the city. The first several years were spent doing survey work with excavation beginning in 1911. The famous Nefertiti Bust, now in Berlin's Neues Museum, was discovered amongst other sculptural artefacts in the workshop of the sculptor Thutmose. The outbreak of the First World War in August 1914 terminated the German excavations.

In two seasons between 1923 and 1925 an Egypt Exploration Society expedition returned to excavation at Amarna under the direction of T.E. Peet, Sir Leonard Woolley, Henri Frankfort, Stephen Glanville, and John Pendlebury. Mary Chubb served as the digs administrator. The renewed investigations were focused on religious and royal structures. Their work resumed in two seasons between 1930 and 1932.

Excavation resumed in the 1977 under with the Amarna Survey directed by Barry J. Kemp with the University of Cambridge and Amarna Expedition under Salvatore Garfi under the auspices of the Egypt Exploration Society and continued until 1982. Work was curtailed at that point due to regional conditions but resumed in 1996 under the Amarna Project and still under the direction of Barry J. Kemp. In the 2000 season work also included the nearby archaeological site of Kom el-Nana and the start of a GPS survey of the region around Amarna. Much of the work during this period was at the house of the king's chief charioteer, Ranefer which had been partially excavated in 1921. A separate expedition led by Geoffrey Martin described and copied the reliefs from the Royal Tomb, later publishing its findings together with objects thought to have come from the tomb.

Excavation at Amarna, under Amarna Project, continues to the present. Work includes excavation at a cemetery, close to the southern tombs of the Nobles and at several other cemeteries of private individuals.

== In media ==
=== Fictional ===
Akhenaten, Dweller in Truth" is a novel published in 1985 by Nobel Prize winning author Naguib Mahfouz. Written in Arabic, the novel was translated into English in 1998. The novel follows a young scribe named Meriamun, living in the reign of Akhenaten's son Tutankhamun. Tutankhamun and his advisors left Akhenaten's capitol at Amarna when they rejected the cult of Aten and restored worship of Egypt's traditional religious pantheon. Meriamun becomes captivated by the abandoned city of Amarna, which his father describes as cursed and "the city of the heretic." Seeking to understand the mystery of city and if the pharaoh who built it was sincere in his radical religious beliefs, Meriamun begins to interview the surviving members of Akhenaten's court, culminating in a conversation with Akhenaten's queen, Nefertiti, the last living resident of Amarna.

The Painted Queen written by American novelist Barbara Mertz is the most recent installment to the Amelia Peabody novels after the author's passing in 2013. A trained archaeologist, Mertz was told by her male colleagues that a woman could not be an archaeologist, so "she created characters based on those misogynistic Egyptologists...". The novel's main character is a female archaeologist named Amelia Peabody, who is searching for a missing bust of Nefertiti. The Painted Queen takes place in the 1912, several years after the initial excavations at Amarna.

Nefertiti by Michelle Moran is a work of historical fiction told from the perspective of Queen Nefertiti Nefertiti and her younger sister Mutnodjmet. The story follows the sisters from their childhoods in Thebes, to Akhenaten's court at Amarna, and after Akhenaten's death.

=== Non-fictional ===
The City of Akhenaten and Nefertiti: Amarna and its People by Barry Kemp, discusses everything from the conception of Amarna to the abandonment of the city. Within the book are images that display art, architecture, and the city as it was (reconstructed) and now. It also has a short chapter written by Kemp in the book Cities That Shaped the Ancient World.

=== Magazines ===
National Geographic published an article on Amarna in 2021.

=== Opera ===
Akhnaten, act II, scene 3 ("The City") by Philip Glass describes the mandate from Akhenaten to build Amarna. In the English lines, it is consistently referred to as the "City of the Horizon".

== Gallery ==
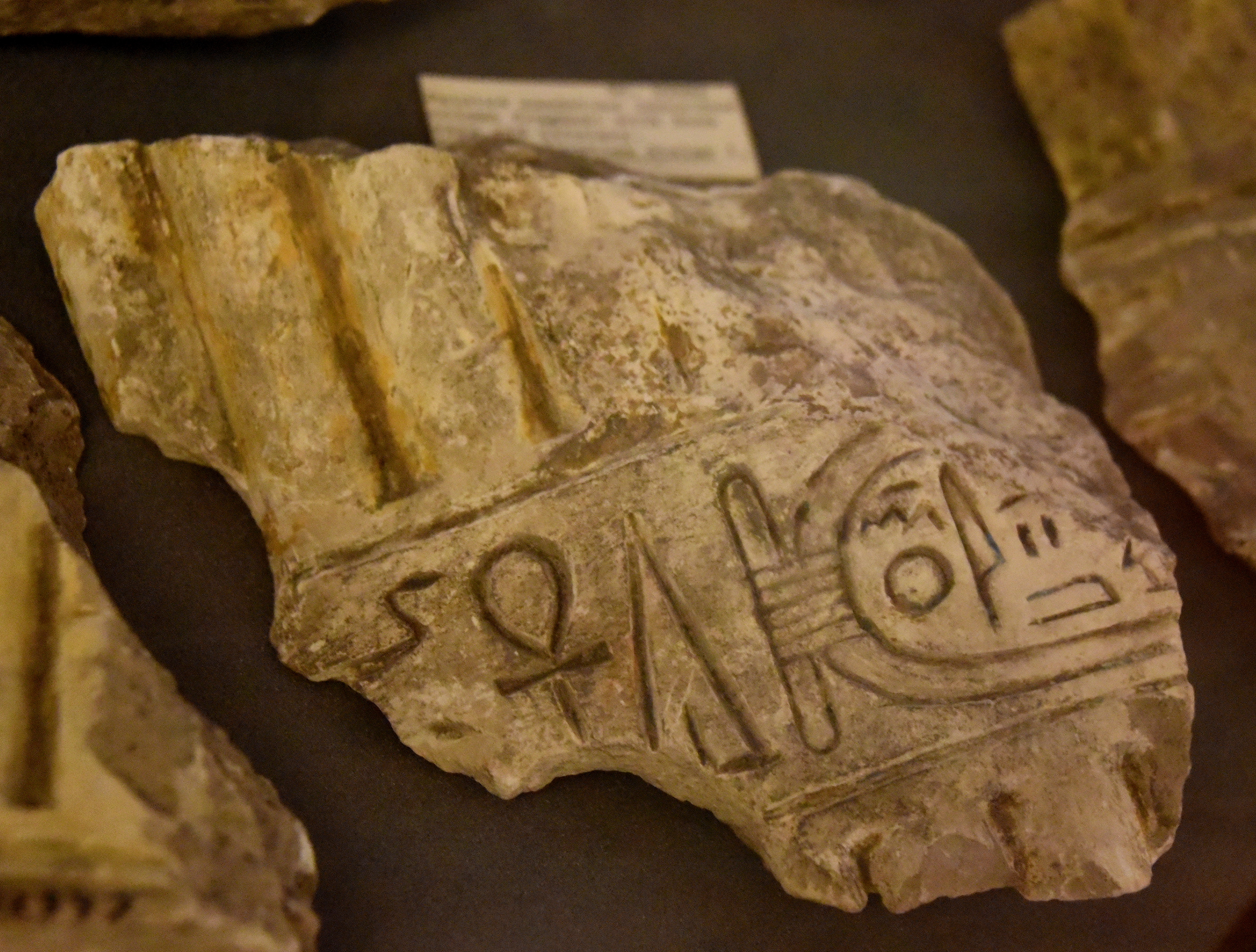
Limestone fragment column showing reeds and an early Aten cartouche. Reign of Akhenaten. From Amarna, Egypt. The Petrie Museum of Egyptian Archaeology, London

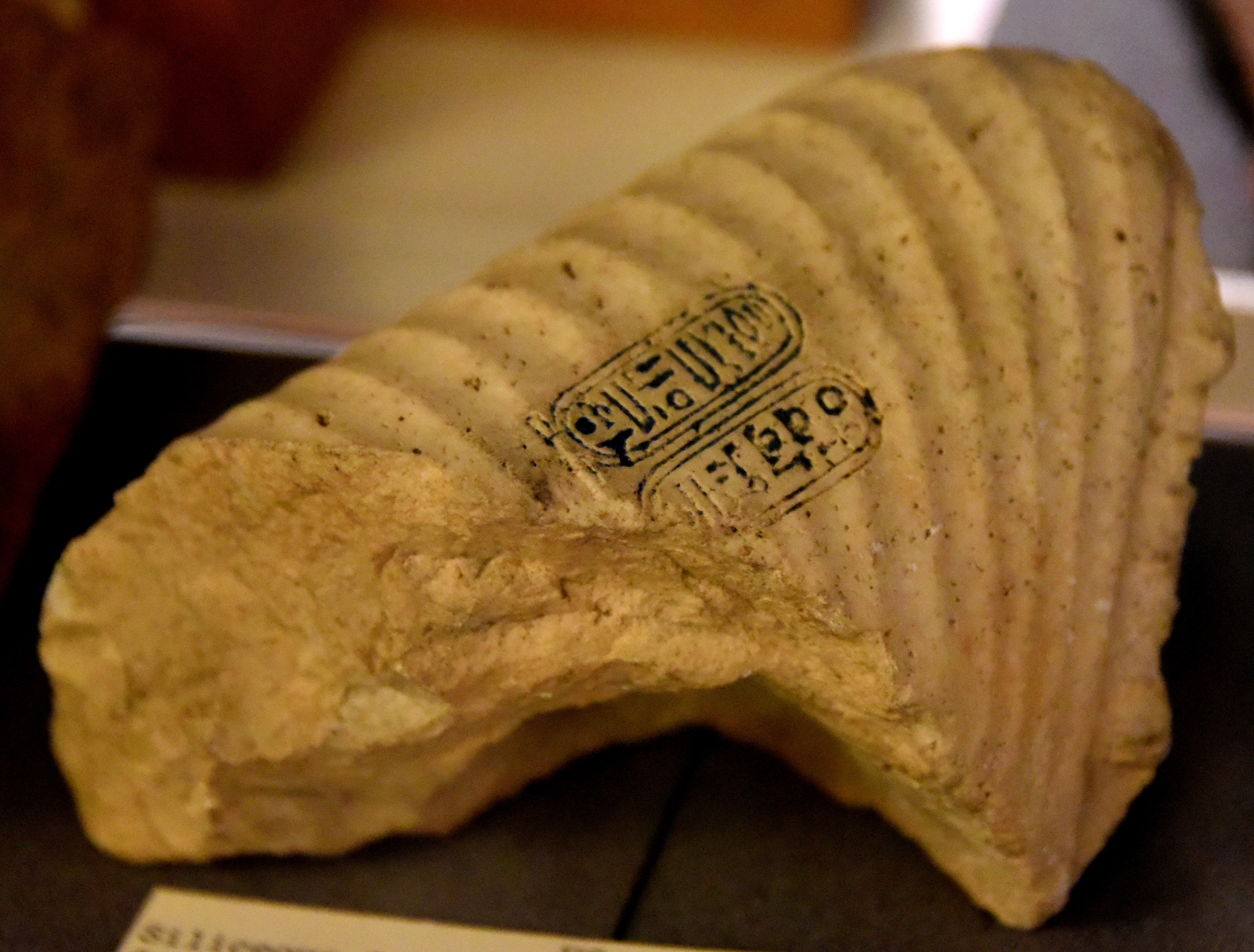
Siliceous limestone fragment of a statue. There are late Aten cartouches on the draped right shoulder. Reign of Akhenaten. From Amarna, Egypt. The Petrie Museum of Egyptian Archaeology, London

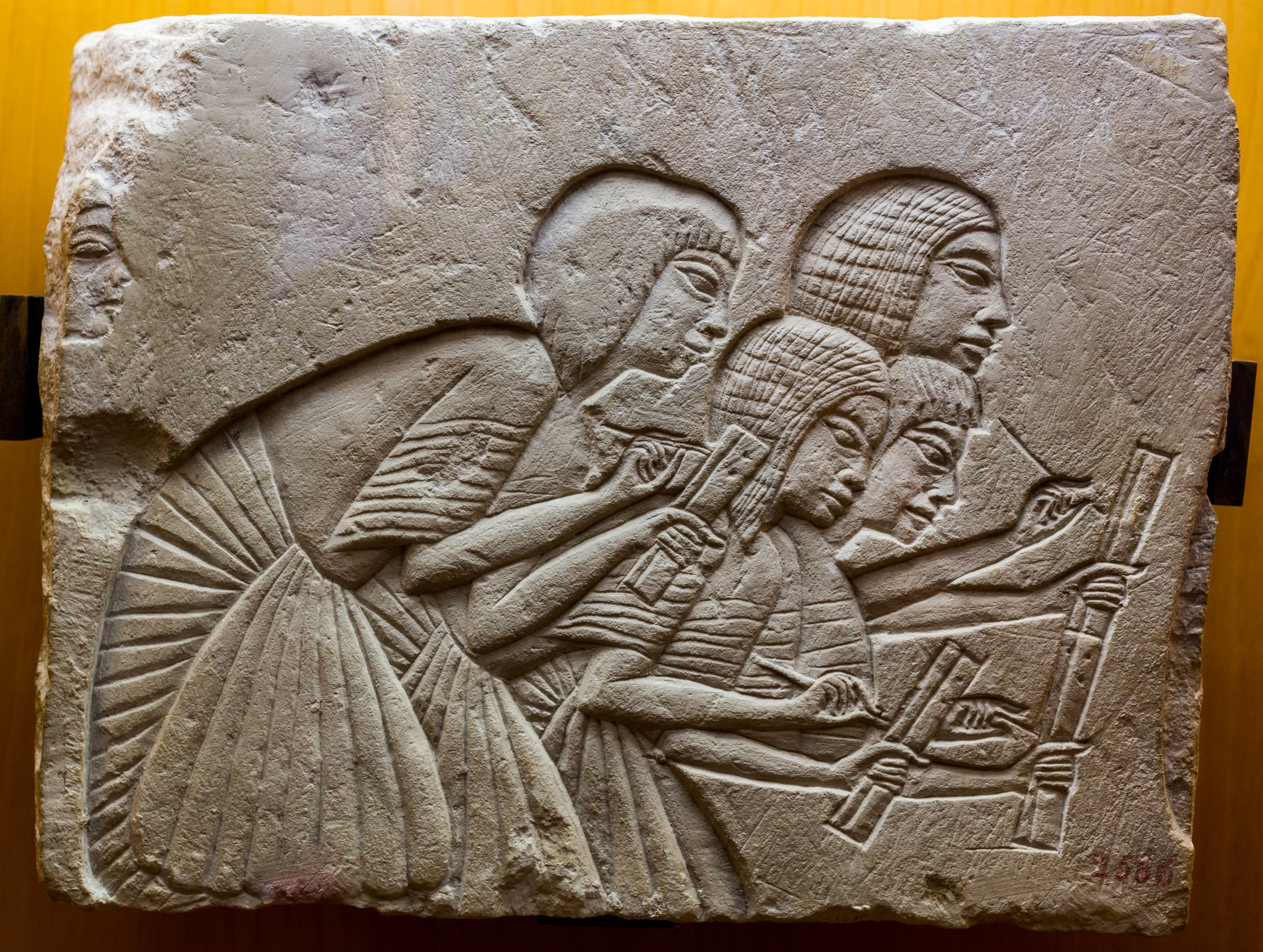
Scribes with pens and papyrus scrolls. Relief from the tomb of General Horemheb in Saqqara. Amarna-Period

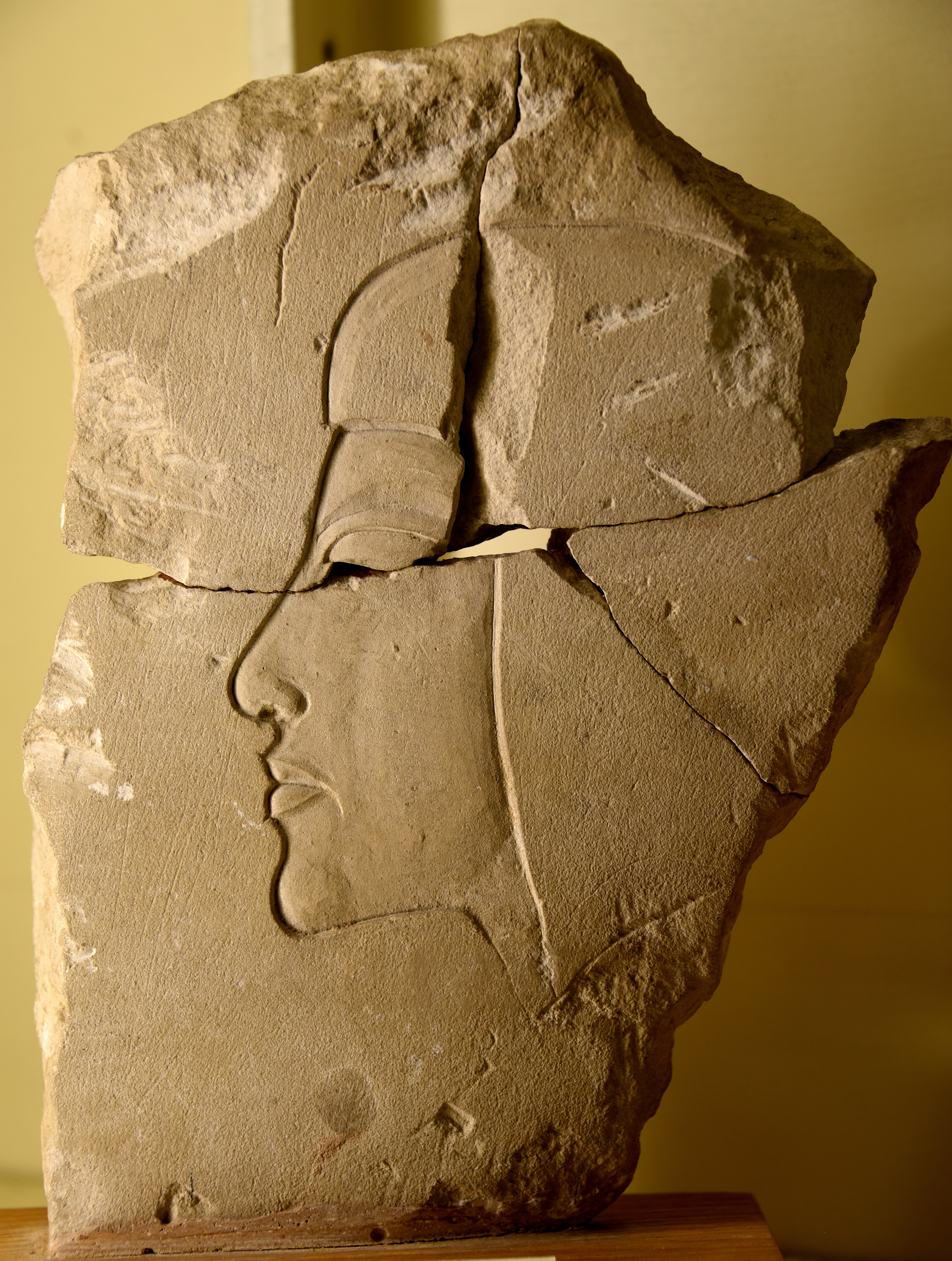
Limestone trial piece of a private person. Head of a princess on the reverse. Reign of Akhenaten. From Amarna, Egypt. Petrie Museum of Egyptian Archaeology, UCL, London

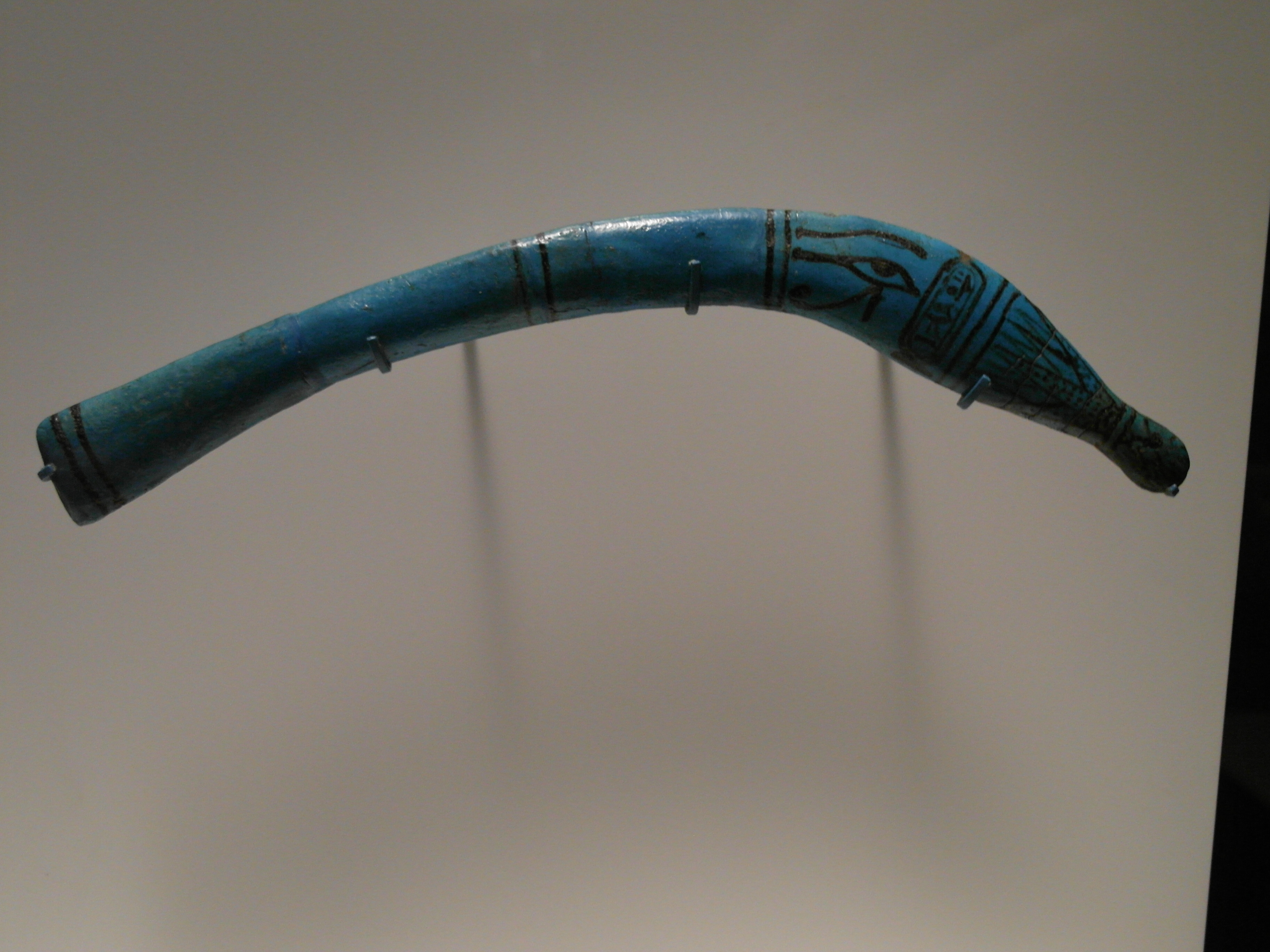
Blue faience throwing stick belonging to the Pharaoh Akhenaten. It was used for hunting birds, although this particular piece is likely decorative and intended for magical use. It is decorated with the sovereign's name, lotus flowers, and amulets.

== Bibliography ==
- Aldred, Cyril (1991) [1988]. Akhenaten, King of Egypt. London: Thames and Hudson. ISBN 0500276218.
- Arnold, Dieter (2003) [1994]. Strudwick, Nigel; Strudwick, Helen (eds.). The Encyclopaedia of Ancient Egyptian Architecture (English language ed.). London: I.B. Tauris. ISBN 1-86064-465-1.
- Breasted, James Henry, ed. (2001) [1906]. Ancient Records of Egypt. Vol. 2 (Paperback ed.). Urbana; Chicago: University of Illinois Press. ISBN 0-252-06974-9.
- Dodson, Aidan (2014). Amarna Sunrise: Egypt from the Golden Age to Age of Heresy (1st ed.). Cairo; New York: The American University in Cairo Press. ISBN 978-9774166334.
- Redford, Donald B. (May 2013). "Akhenaten: New Theories and Old Facts". Bulletin of the American Schools of Oriental Research. 369 (369). American Schools of Oriental Research: 9–34. doi:10.5615/bullamerschoorie.369.0009. ISSN 0003-097X. JSTOR 10.5615/bullamerschoorie.369.000. OCLC 05748058.
- Ridley, Ronald Thomas (2019). Akhenaten: A Historian's View. The AUC History of Ancient Egypt. Cairo; New York: The American University in Cairo Press. ISBN 978-9774167935.
- Shaw, Ian, ed. (2003) [2000]. The Oxford History of Ancient Egypt (New ed.). Oxford; New York: Oxford University Press. ISBN 978-0-19-280458-7.

Preceded by Thebes	Capital of Egypt (Akhetaten) c. 1353 BC – c. 1332 BC	Succeeded by Thebes
