= Small Aten Temple =

Ancient Egyptian temple located in Amarna

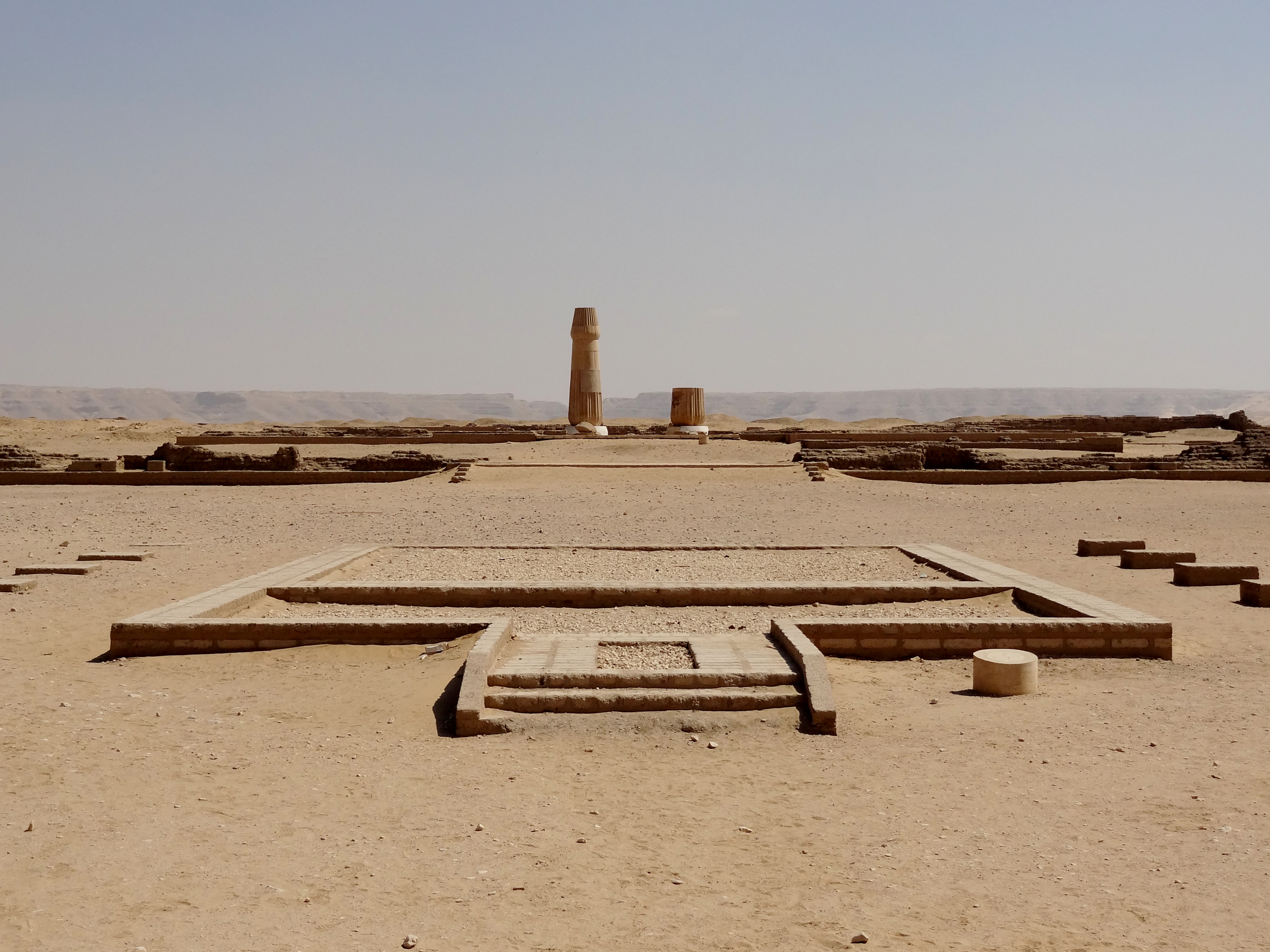
- Looking up the main axis of the Small Aten Temple at Amarna

- Location within Egypt
- 27.6453°N 30.8963°E
- Type: Temple
- Periods: Eighteenth Dynasty of Egypt
- Location: Amarna, Minya Governorate, Egypt
- Region: Upper Egypt
- Part of: Amarna

History
- Built: Approximately 1346 BC
- Built by: Akhenaten

The Small Aten Temple is a temple to the Aten located in the ancient Egyptian city of Amarna. It is one of the two major temples in the city, the other being the Great Temple of the Aten. It is situated next to the King's House and near the Royal Palace, in the central part of the city. Originally known as the Hwt-Jtn or Mansion of the Aten, it was probably constructed before the larger Great Temple. Its only contemporary depiction is found in the tomb of Tutu (Amarna Tomb 8). Like the other structures in the city, it was constructed quickly, and hence was easy to dismantle and reuse the material for later construction.

It was first excavated in 1931 by the Egypt Exploration Society.

== Layout ==
The structure was surrounded by a large temenos enclosure wall made of large bricks measuring 37 x 19 x 14.5 cm. The temenos enclosed an area of 127 m by 200 m. On the eastern end the remains of flower beds were found, and an avenue of trees separated it from the surrounding buildings. The main entrance was from the west, through two massive brick pylons. Each pylon had slots for two flag poles. Walls projecting forward from the pylon gateway originally held doors. In the main entrance, a large area of preserved gypsum plaster was found bearing the impressions of blocks and mason's marks. This area of plaster was the base of a later platform with a stepped exterior approach and a ramped interior. The find of a ring bezel bearing the name 'Ankhkheperure' dates this to the reigns of pharaohs Smenkhkare or Neferneferuaten. Smaller entrances, with their own projecting walls, were found on either side of the main pylons.

=== First court ===
A ramp of whitewashed mud led down into this area. On either side of this ramp were offering tables of mudbrick and in the centre a large altar of mudbrick. The whole court was paved with mud plaster. This area seems to be the oldest part of the complex, as it overlays clean gravel and its surface underlays the later pylon gateway. This 'Great Altar' was later demolished to ground level and some of its bricks were incorporated into the enlargement of the two altars nearest to the entrance, which may have served as the bases of statues.

=== Second court ===
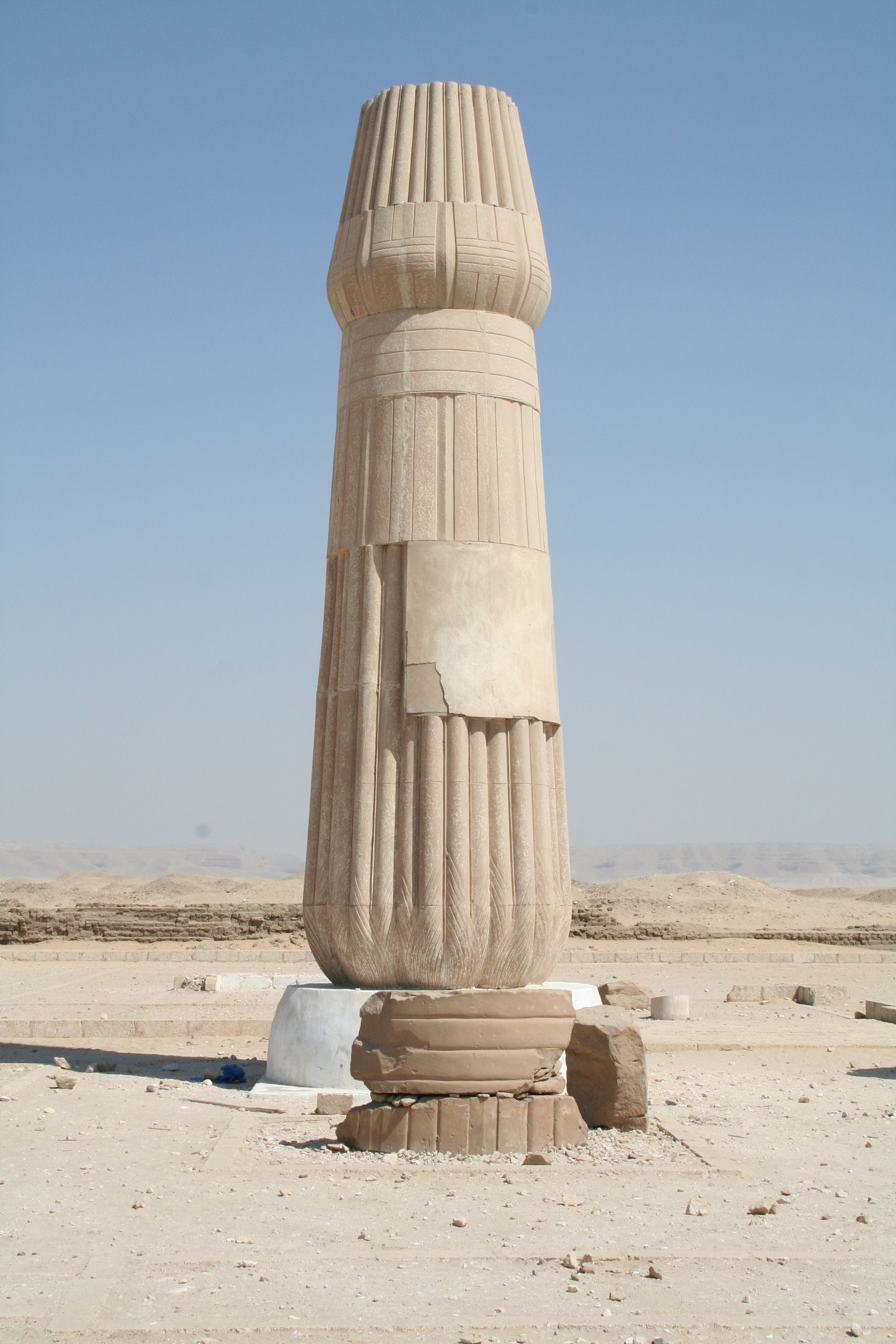
One of the reconstructed papyriform columns in the sanctuary

A second set of pylon gateways with smaller entrances identical to the main entrance lead to this court. Within the pylons were niches for granite stelae. This court had side entrances to the north and south, thought to be private entrances for the king and priests respectively. The southern entrance has a small porters house. Outside this gate was a dump of stone from the destruction of the Sanctuary, like that of the Great Aten Temple.

The southern pylon had a small priest's house attached to it. Fragments of a small painted uraeus cornice were found here.

=== Sanctuary court ===
The gateway to this court was again flanked by pylons identical to the previous gates. However, there were no additional entrances and no niches for stelae. Trees surround the Sanctuary on the eastern side. The southern half of the court contained a number of buildings. In the southeast corner there was a small brick building that contained a series of rooms including one with a dais. To the northwest of this building was another approached by a ramp which was possibly a subsidiary chapel. To the west of this building was another, consisting of a single room, which was connected to the south wing of the Sanctuary by a series of walls that possibly belonged to a small house. Its walls were thick and well built, and the floor was paved with bricks.

=== Sanctuary ===
The outer court of the Sanctuary had projecting wings on either side of the main building. The exterior of these walls were stone and the partitions were of mud brick. A ramp with balustrade led to the first court of the Sanctuary, passing between two thin pylons, and likely continued as a causeway to the altar in the centre. This first court was full of offering tables. The thin gateway to the inner court was flanked by four large columns on each side. It is likely that the life-size limestone statues, fragments of which were found in the dump, once stood in this area. The entrance to the inner court was of the same winding type also seen in the Great Aten Temple. The entire court was filled with offering tables and surrounded by small chapels built into the walls.

In 1994, concrete replicas of the papyriform columns were assembled in their original position in front of the inner sanctuary court. These columns were replicas based on the fragments found in the 1931 excavation and were manufactured in Egypt from moulds made in England.

== See also ==
- List of ancient Egyptian sites, including sites of temples
