= Barry Kemp =

Barry Kemp may refer to:

- Barry Kemp (Egyptologist) (1940–2024), English archaeologist and Egyptologist
- Barry Kemp (TV producer) (born 1949), television producer, director and writer
