= Royal Wadi and tombs =

Royal ancient Egyptian cemetery

Coordinates: 27.6239°N 30.9839°E

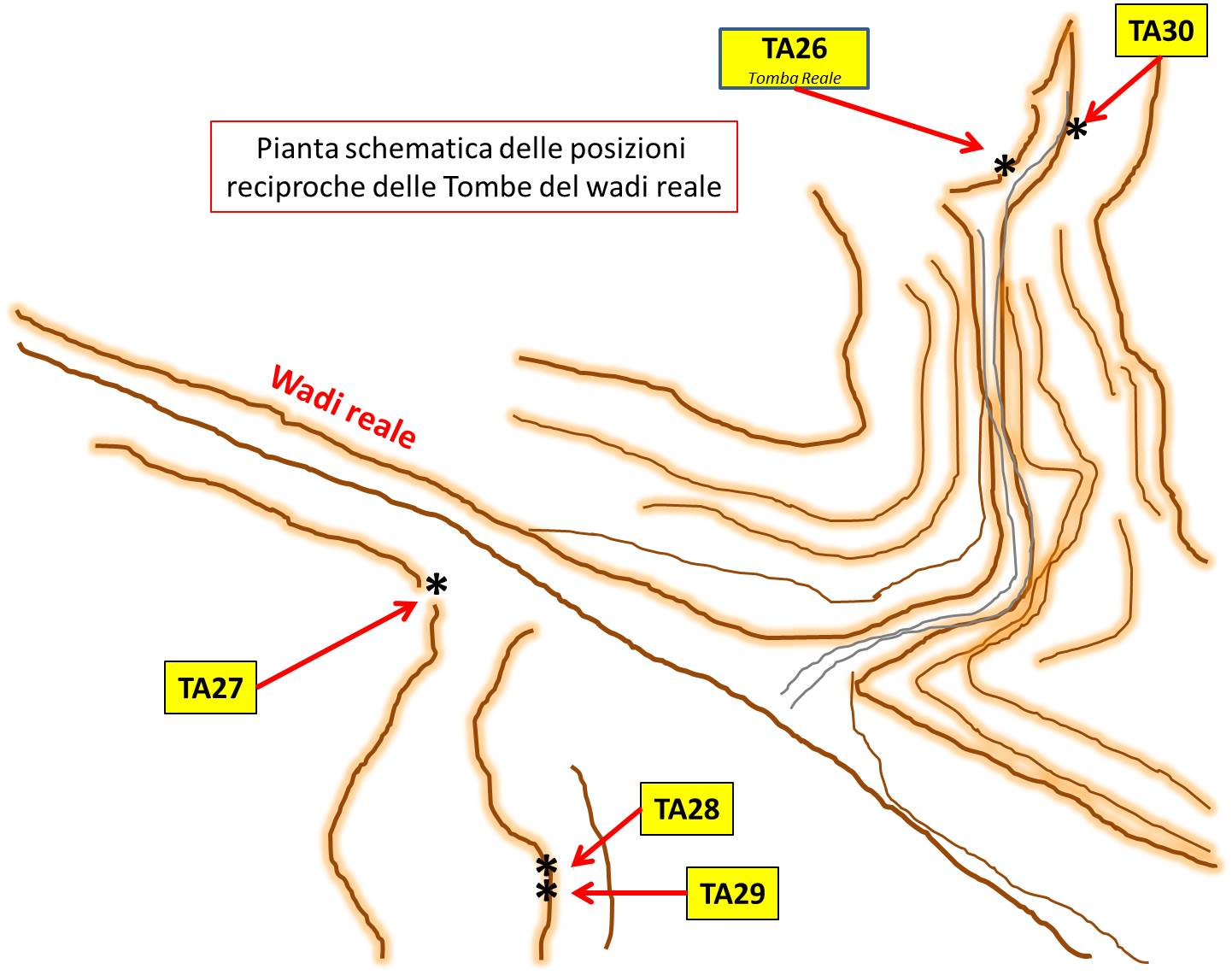
Map of the Royal Wadi, Amarna

The Royal Wadi (known locally as Wadi Abu Hassah el-Bahari) is a necropolis in Amarna, Egypt. It is the burial place of the Ancient Egyptian royal family of Amarna, which reigned during the 18th Dynasty. The cemetery is a local parallel to the Valley of the Kings.

There has been a great deal of work to ease access to the Royal Tomb of Akhenaten, and to protect the tombs from damage by flash flooding. The wadi can now be journeyed along on a metalled road, and the tomb is protected by a covering and channels to divert water away from its entrance. The angle of the entrance and descent allows sunlight (Aten) to reach all the way down to the burial chamber, however the tomb is unfinished and had it been finished at the time, sunlight would not have been able to reach the chamber.

In the wadi itself, there are five tombs, the Royal Tomb of Akhenaten, three unfinished tombs in a side wadi, and what seems to be a cache, near to the Royal Tomb.

== Royal Wadi ==
The Royal Wadi, known in Arabic as Wadi Abu Hassah el-Bahari, is one of several valleys (wadi in Arabic) that open onto the Amarna plain on the east side of the Nile. The Royal Wadi is directly east of the main city. When viewed from the plain, it forms a gap in the surrounding cliffs that resembles the hieroglyph for "horizon". Egyptologist Cyril Aldred suggests this resemblance may have been a factor in Akhenaten's selection of the site as his new capital, and in its name, Akhetaten, meaning "Horizon of the Aten."

== Royal Tomb ==
The Royal Tomb (Tomb 26) is the only decorated tomb, and contained the burial of the 18th Dynasty Pharaoh Akhenaten. It includes a suite of chambers for his daughters, his mother and probably Nefertiti, although she was never buried there.

== Tomb 27 ==
Tomb 27 is cut into the bedrock just above the valley floor at the mouth of a small side valley. The tomb is unfinished, consisting of a monumental doorway, entrance staircase of 21 stairs flanking a central ramp, and a single descending corridor; a doorway was begun in the left wall of the corridor. The rock is of the same uneven type as the Royal Tomb, and despite its unfinished state, the process of plastering and smoothing the corridor walls was begun. It seems to have been intended for a royal burial, as the doorway and entrance are the same size as that of the Royal Tomb. However, it was never finished and no burial material has ever been found. No foundation deposit was located, but it may have been intended for the burial of Akhenaten's successor Neferneferuaten. A fragment of an ushabti belonging to Akhenaten was found at the entrance, but Gabolde and Dunsmore suggest this was transported there from the Royal Tomb during the 1930s.

== Tomb 28 ==
This is the only finished tomb in the Wadi. It is cut into the floor of the valley. Here the limestone rock is crumbly; as a result, the tomb's structural integrity was compromised. El-Khouly and Martin said parts of the tomb resembled "in some ways a natural cave". A very worn descending staircase of 21 steps with no central slide lead to the first room. A doorway on the left wall opens onto a second, square chamber. A further short descending stairway of four roughly-cut steps descends from the first room to a third room. The ceiling in this room has fallen and is in very poor condition. All of the walls and ceilings in the tomb show signs of plastering to give a smooth, squared appearance. The general proportions of entrance and rooms are similar to the suite of three rooms in the Royal Tomb used for the burial of at least one of Akhenaten's daughters. This tomb may have been intended for the burial of a royal child; their parent may have been the intended owner of the neighbouring Tomb 29. Gabolde and Dunsmore suggest the owner was perhaps the daughter of Kiya, a minor wife of Akhenaten. They suggest this tomb may have received a burial, as pieces of faience inlay, vessels, and a fragmentary ushabti coffin were recovered near to Tomb 28 and 29.

== Tomb 29 ==
This tomb was plastered, but never decorated. It is 7.5 m (25 ft) south of Tomb 28. The limestone is very hard and full of holes. It consists of an entrance stair with no central ramp, and four descending corridors; the fourth corridor was unfinished when the tomb was abandoned. In plan it is similar to the suite of six rooms in the Royal Tomb of Akhenaten thought to have been intended for the burial of Nefertiti. It is 500 m (1,600 ft) from the Royal Tomb, a distance which suggests it was cut for a lesser royal wife, possibly Kiya. Many stone pounders were found in the excavation dump outside the tomb and in the valley, which lead Gabolde and Dunsmore to suggest that, after work on the tomb was halted, workmen may have used it as a place to store their tools. Large quantities of pottery were recovered from the dump, including a pottery sherd stamped with "the inner (burial) chamber of Neferneferure".

A docket found in this tomb refers to a Year 1, so the tomb must have been open in the time of Akhenaten's successors.

== Tomb 30 ==
This small tomb is just north of the Royal Tomb, on the opposite side of the same wadi. It is cut into the floor of the valley, and is simple, with only a descending entrance leading to a single, unfinished room. It may have been used as a cache for embalming materials for the individuals buried in the Royal Tomb.
