= Great Temple of the Aten =

Ancient Egyptian temple located in Amarna

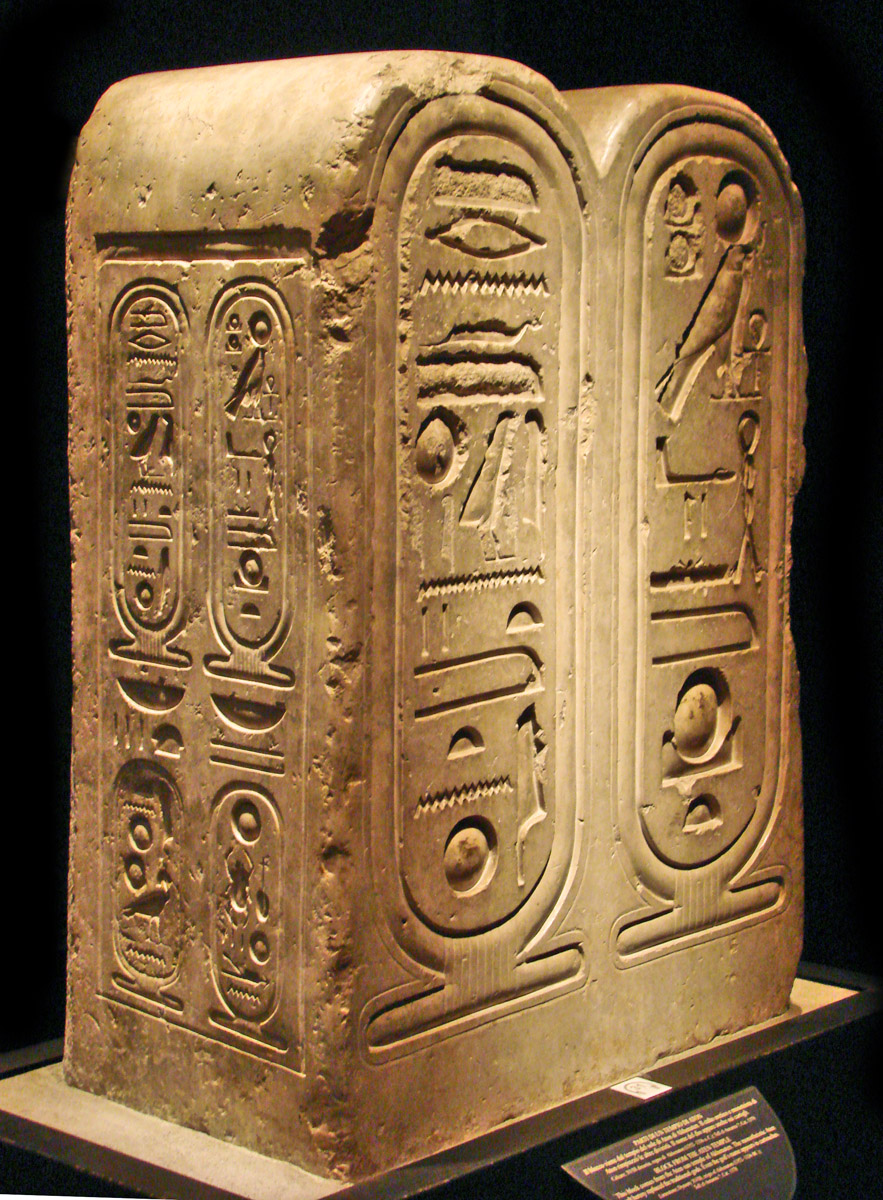
- Surviving stela from the Great Temple of the Aten

- Location within Egypt
- 27.650°N 30.901°E
- Type: Temple
- Periods: Eighteenth Dynasty of Egypt
- Location: Amarna, Minya Governorate, Egypt
- Region: Upper Egypt
- Part of: Amarna

History
- Built: Approximately 1346 BC
- Built by: Akhenaten

The Great Temple of the Aten (or the pr-Jtn, House of the Aten) was a temple located in the city of el-Amarna (ancient Akhetaten), Egypt. It served as the main place of worship of the deity Aten during the reign of the 18th Dynasty pharaoh Akhenaten (c. 1353–1336 BCE). Akhenaten ushered in a unique period of ancient Egyptian history by establishing the new religious cult dedicated to the sun-disk Aten, originally an aspect of Ra, the sun god in traditional ancient Egyptian religion. The king shut down traditional worship of other deities like Amun-Ra, and brought in a new era, though short-lived, of seeming monotheism where the Aten was worshipped as a sun god and Akhenaten and his wife, Nefertiti, represented the divinely royal couple that connected the people with the god. Although he began construction at Karnak during his rule, the association the city had with other gods drove Akhenaten to establish a new city and capital at Amarna for the Aten. Akhenaten built the city along the east bank of the Nile River, setting up workshops, palaces, suburbs and temples. The Great Temple of the Aten was located just north of the Central City and, as the largest temple dedicated to the Aten, was where Akhenaten fully established the proper cult and worship of the sun-disk.

== Construction ==
The city of Akhetaten was built rather hastily and was constructed mostly of mud-brick. Mud-bricks were made by drying in the sun and they measured 33–37 cm x 15–16 cm x 9–10 cm, although bricks for temple enclosure walls were slightly larger, at 38 cm x 16 cm x 16 cm. During construction, bricks were laid down with a small amount of mortar between the rows and no mortar between adjacent bricks. There was no rain to deteriorate the bricks but they would wear down from wind-swept sand, so for protection walls were plastered with a layer of mud that could be reapplied. As the bricks dried, they often shrank leading to warping and structural problems, so a technique was developed of arranging the rows of bricks so that every other row was nearly hollow, allowing for air to circulate. While this helped walls keep their form, it also acted to weaken the walls so particularly high constructions meant to hold a lot of weight had to be made differently. For pylon towers and large surrounding walls like those at the Great Temple of the Aten, timber was used for structural support and the public buildings within the Temple had stone columns and were built of other stones for more support. Stone columns conformed to the usual style found elsewhere in Egypt, representing either palm-frond or papyrus. To lay out structural elements like offering tables and pits on a plaster floor, string was used. The string was first dipped in black paint and stretched tightly and was allowed to touch the ground, leaving a mark. In some instances the string was even pushed into the plaster floor, leaving a shallow groove. A similar technique was used to divide up wall surfaces before they were decorated with relief.

The actual construction of the temple was accomplished in a series of steps. Before anything was built, there was already some kind of dedication ceremony at the site. A ceremonial gateway with receptacles for liquid offerings stood at the beginning of a paved avenue. The avenue extended eastward and was lined with sphinxes, but they were later replaced by trees (tree pits, some still containing tree roots, have been excavated). The avenue led up to a small mud-brick shrine which was later built into the main design scheme of the Temple. The first main construction undertaken by Akhenaten was the building of the temenos wall, enclosing a huge area of 229m x 730m. As the wall was being completed, the stone Sanctuary at the east end of the enclosure was built. This Sanctuary seemed to function on its own for some time until a few years later when Akhenaten added the Gem-Aten on the west side of the enclosure. With this addition, the original ceremonial gate had to be taken down and a raised causeway was built over it. The Gem-Aten was originally constructed in stone, but it seems that as time went on Akhenaten ran low on materials and the latter part of the Gem-Aten was finished with mud-brick. It is unknown exactly how the Temple walls were decorated because the entire area was destroyed later on, but fragments that have been found show that there were many statues of Akhenaten and his family placed all around the Temple.

== Layout ==
The Great Temple of the Aten lay to the north of the Central City part of Akhetaten and was separated from the Palace by many storehouses. The Temple was oriented on an east-west axis and the western entrance to the Great Temple was along the Royal Road, a road that ran through the city and parallel to the Nile River. Soon after the death of Akhenaten, Atenism was rejected as a religion and the city was destroyed. The temple was dismantled, covered in new sand, and paved over, but ironically this has preserved the site better than it might normally have been for archaeologists today. In 1890, Flinders Petrie, with permission from the Egyptian Antiquities Service, began excavating the area. Based on the remaining foundations he found as well as on multiple scenes of the Great Temple found in private tomb decoration in Amarna, a comprehensive reconstruction of the temple has been possible.

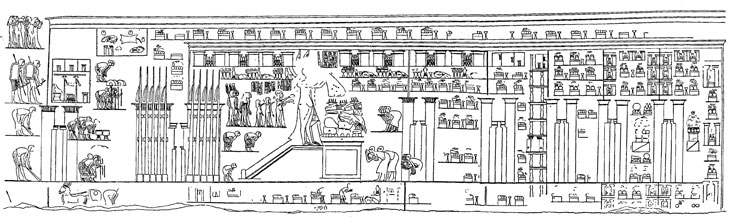
The temple as pictured in Panehsy's tomb

One of the most distinctive aspects of the Temple was that there was no cult image of the god. Instead, the Temple was open-aired and had no roof, so that people worshipped the actual sun directly overhead as it traveled from east to west. In fact this was a common theme amongst all of the Aten temples; they were all arranged to direct worship towards the sky (such as in the Ḥwt Aten (Mansion of Aten), the smaller temple of Aten located 500m south of the Great Temple in Akhetaten).

In the Great Temple there were two main structures, the Gem-Aten and the Sanctuary, which were separated by about 300m. Upon entering the enclosure wall, one faced the first of these structures, the Gem-Aten, which was a very long building preceded by a court called the Per-Hai (House of Rejoicing). On the left of the main entrance to the Temple was a columned pavilion and on both the left and the right were small chapels. These chapels, originally built for Queen Kiya, were later taken over by the elder princesses. The first great pylon directly ahead was the entrance into the Per-Hai and it had swinging doors and five pairs of tall masts with crimson pennants flanking the doorway. The inside of the Per-Hai had two rows of four columns on each side. Within these colonnades were altars made of limestone carved with images of the King and Queen giving offerings. Through the Per-Hai and the next great pylon was the Gem-Aten, the [Place of] He Who Found the Aten, and this was a series of six courtyards separated by pylons, all leading to a main sanctuary and altar. This Temple differed from temples of other gods because as one progressed through the courts, they became more open to the air and light, as opposed to temples like those of Amun-Ra where the halls would get darker and more shrouded in mystery. The first court had a high altar with small chapels and chambers on either side. Each successive court had altars and magazines where offering supplies could be stored. The fourth court was columned and had many furnished chambers where people could rest in the shade. The final court had a main High Altar intended for the Royal pair, and it was surrounded by 365 mud-brick altars on either side, one for each day of the year, divided to represent Upper and Lower Egypt. The offerings given here were dedicated to the Aten but were then used to feed the officiating priests, the temple staff, and even some of the local populace. Beyond this High Altar the Gem-Aten abruptly ended in a blank wall, which shows no sign of having had a door in it. On the outside of the Gem-Aten there was enough room to have a large ambulatory and there were 40 rows of 20 offering tables set up on each side.

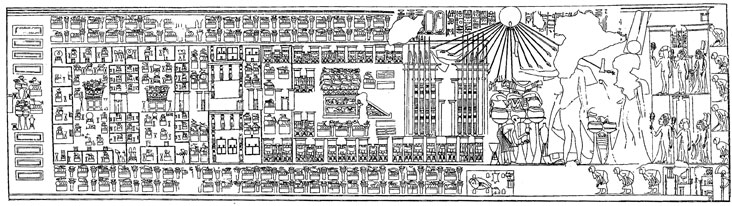
The temple as pictured in Meryre's tomb

Between the Gem-Aten and the Sanctuary, the main building at the east end of the enclosure, was a smaller, more sacred pillared portico with statues of the pharaoh Akhenaten and his family standing in front of each column. Inside the portico was a great quartzite stela next to a colossal seated statue of Akhenaten. This stela was carved with images of Akhenaten and Nefertiti and was a variation of a benben stone, a sacred solar symbol of Heliopolis. Traditionally, the benben stone was a representation of the island created by the sun-god Atum at the beginning of the world. This marked one of the holiest areas in the Temple and it was heaped in flowers and offerings. Today only a fragment of this stone has been found (discovered by Carter in 1892), but it was identified as a benben stone based on scenes of the Temple found in nearby tombs.

Also between the Gem-Aten and the Sanctuary in the Great Temple was a large square building where meat offerings were slaughtered and prepared, but further excavation of the area is difficult because of the presence of the modern-day cemetery of Et-Till.

The second main structure of the Great Temple was the Sanctuary at its east end, which may have been inspired by the Fifth Dynasty Sun Temples at Abu Ghuroub (c. 2400 BCE). The Sanctuary started with a pylon that led into an open court, on the south side of which were three houses probably intended for the priests on duty. A second pylon led to a causeway that went through two large colonnades with colossal statues of Akhenaten on either side wearing the Red Crown and the White Crown. The causeway continued into a final court that had a high altar surrounded by offering tables. This main altar was probably intended just for the Royal Family, especially after the Gem-Aten was built and put into regular use. Behind the Sanctuary there were other rooms including a large room which housed the original shrine of the dedication ceremony, but these rooms were only accessible from outside the Sanctuary.

Against the northeastern end of the enclosure wall was one final altar called the Hall of Foreign Tribute. This was a large set-in altar and was most likely where offerings from foreign lands were made.

== Worship ==
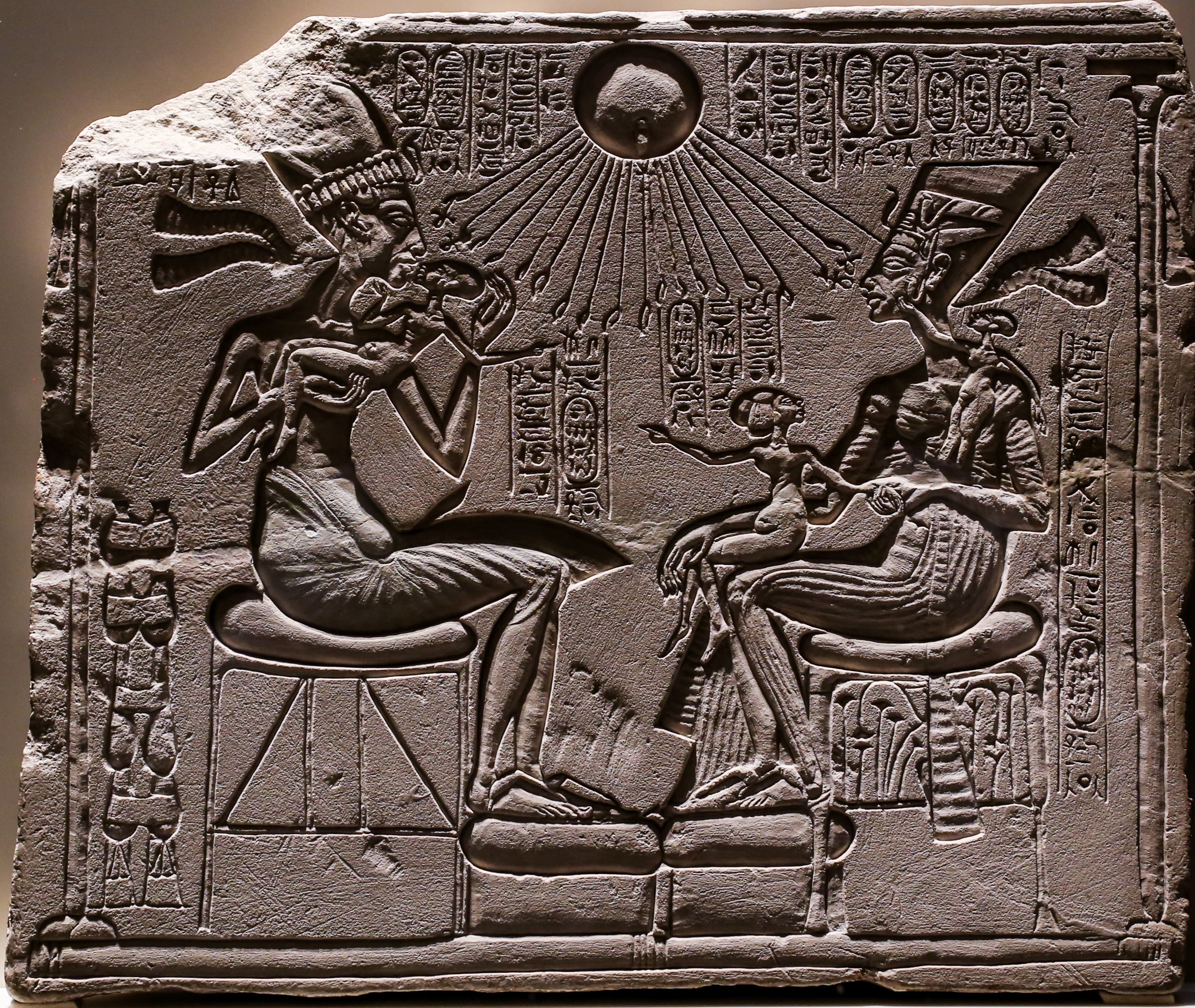
Relief depicting Akhenaton and Nefertiti with three of their daughters under the rays of Aten

The cult of the Aten was celebrated daily and was very simple. Although there were other priests, Akhenaten acted as his own High Priest and special roles were given to the royal women. Since there was no cult statue, the traditional acts of raising and washing the god played no role in the Great Temple and worship rather consisted solely of singing hymns and giving offerings to the Aten. Some hymns told stories, such as one that attributed the Aten with the creation of the human race and recognized that people were created differently, to speak different languages and have different colored skins, while other hymns simply expressed adoration and gratitude to the Aten. Offerings consisted of food, drink, flowers, and perfume and were often accompanied by burning incense and pouring libations. To consecrate offerings, a special baton called a ḫrp was used to touch the offerings, marking it as meant for the Aten.

Each day, the royal family approached the temple on chariots after riding up and down the Royal Road, and entered the temple precinct and presented offerings in front of the Gem-Aten. The king and queen then consecrated their offerings with the ḫrp while their daughters rattled sistra. The family then passed through the pylons of the Gem-Aten and mounted the steps of the High Altar where there were offerings of meat, poultry, vegetables, and flowers already laid out and surmounted by three pans of burning incense. As the king and queen officiated, priests then placed offerings on many of the other altars for the public people while music was played. The princesses continued to rattle the sistra while four male chanters sang hymns to the Aten within the Gem-Aten court. Outside the Gem-Aten were female musicians who performed along with the temple choir which was made up of blind singers and a blind harpist. These musicians performed at intervals throughout the day and were never allowed beyond the outer court.

== Excavation and exploration ==
Flinders Petrie was the first person to work in the temple, and his assistant, Howard Carter excavated in the sanctuary area. However, it was John Pendlebury who actually fully mapped this area during his excavations in 1935. The EES Amarna Survey project returned to re–dig the site and corrected some mistakes in the mapping.

Project leader Sarah Parcak of the University of Alabama at Birmingham, "Based on the coins and pottery we found, it appears to be a massive regional center that traded with Greece, Turkey and Libya."

This is part of a larger project aiming to map as much of ancient Egypt's archaeological sites, or "tells," as possible before they are destroyed or covered by modern development.

Although Akhenaten had several temples dedicated to the Aten, the Great Temple of the Aten was the largest and most significant. During the 18th dynasty reign of Akhenaten, the new city of Akhetaten was completely built up and the regular worship of the Aten was established. However, shortly after the pharaoh's death, all fell apart as successive kings destroyed the Temple and the city in an effort to return to the traditional religion of Egypt. Nonetheless, enough remains preserved of the Great Temple of the Aten to be able to get a sense of what it looked like and how worship of the Aten must have played out for inhabitants of the city of Akhetaten.

== Image gallery ==
=== Sculptural fragments from the temple ===
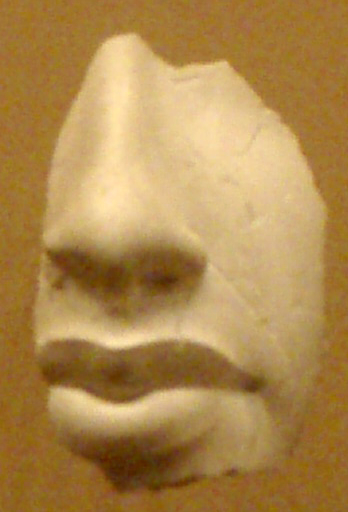
A fragmentary face, likely that of Akhenaten.

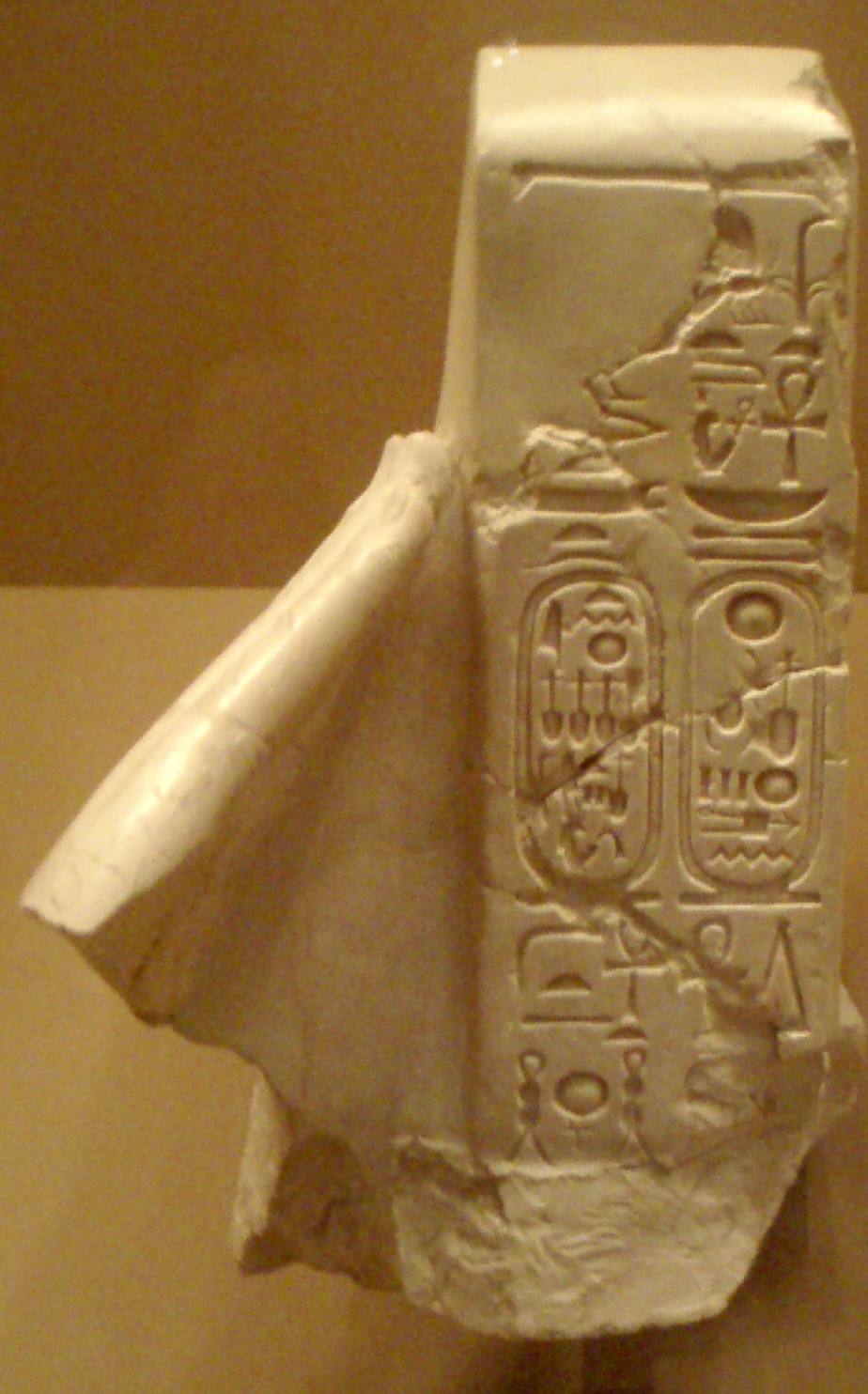
Fragmentary hands offering Aten cartouches.

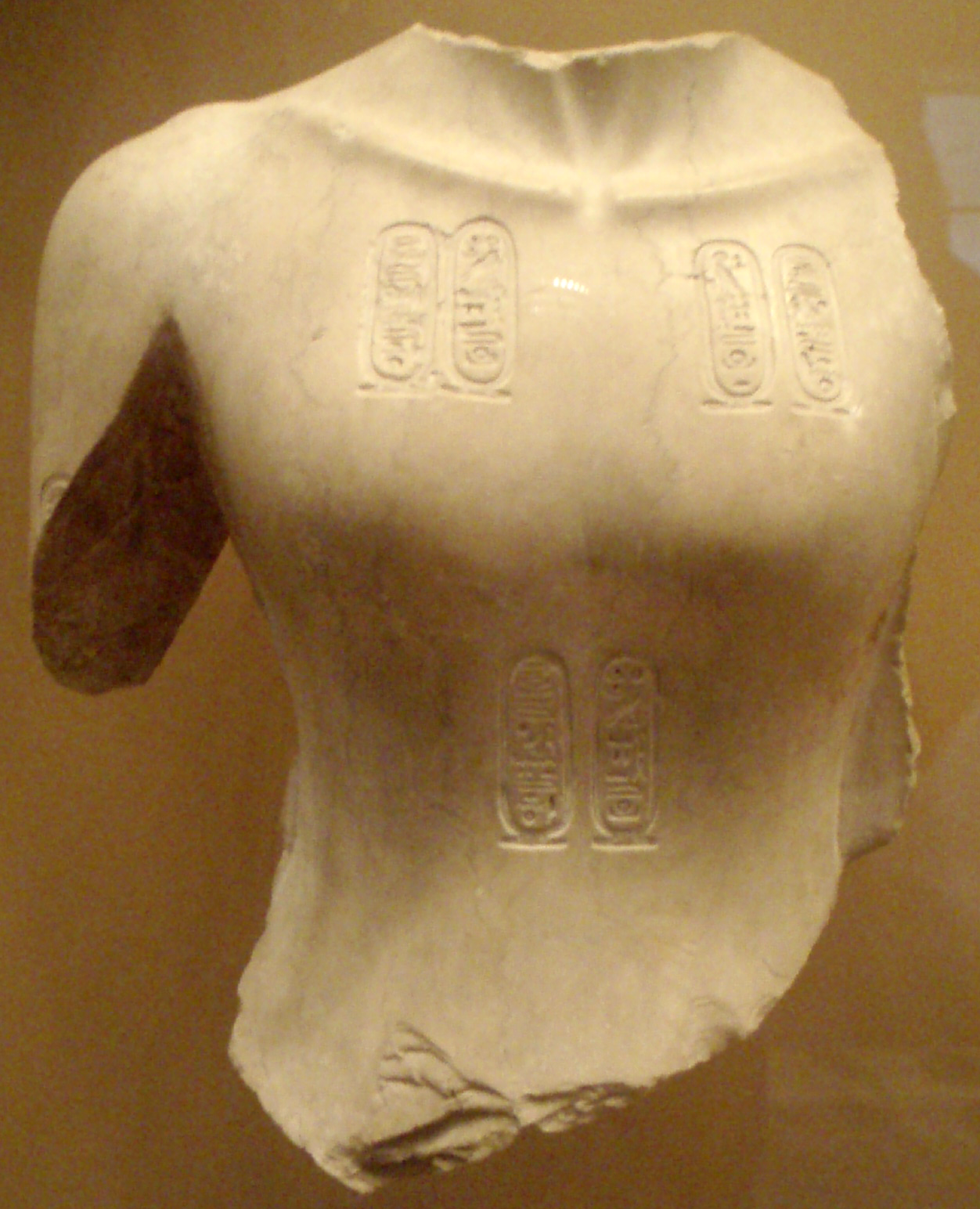
A fragmentary statue of the pharaoh Akhenaten.

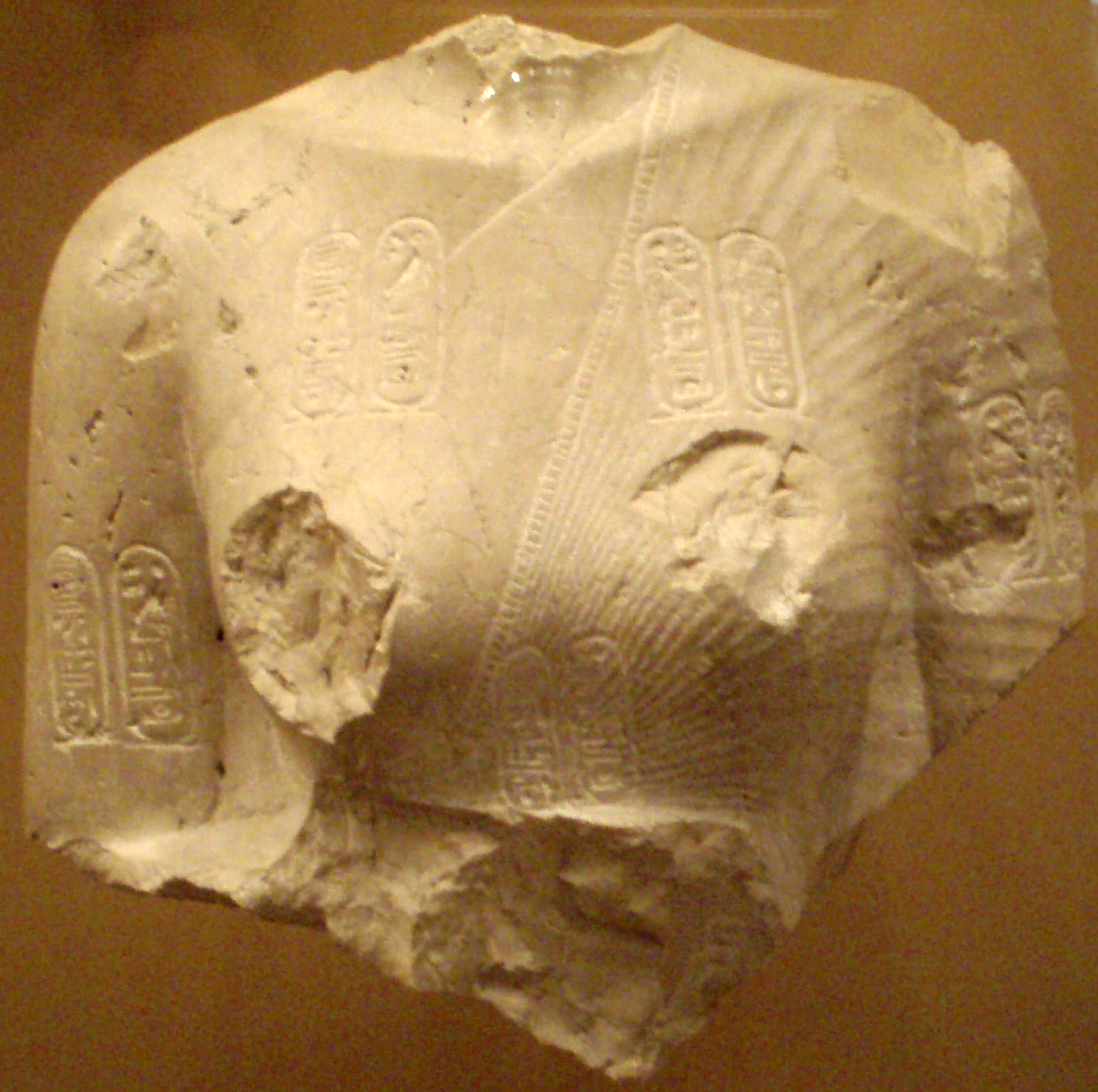
A fragmentary torso of Nefertiti.

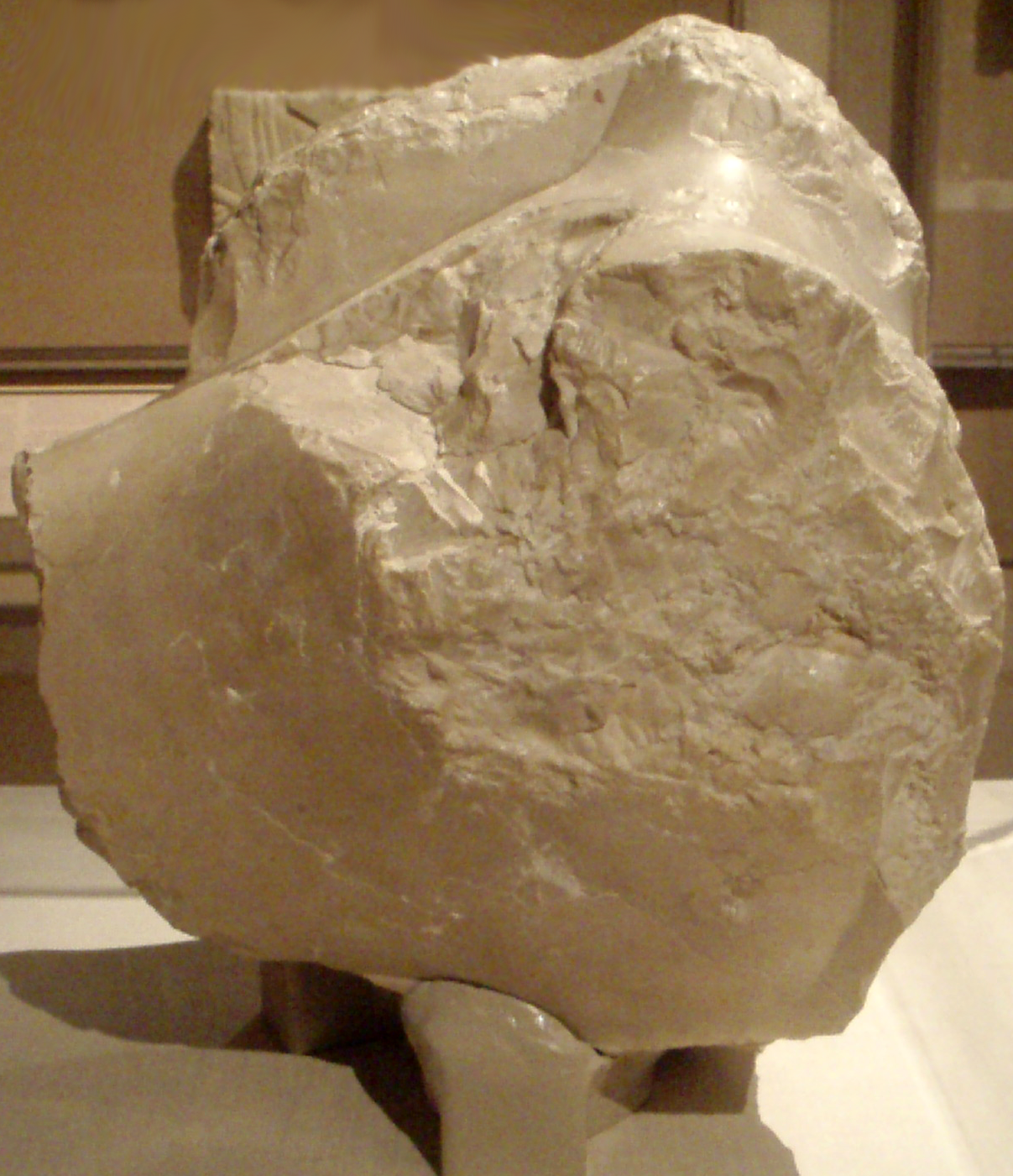
Torso fragment of a prostrate statue, thought to come from the Great Temple of the Aten.

== See also ==
- List of ancient Egyptian sites, including sites of temples
