= Maru-Aten =

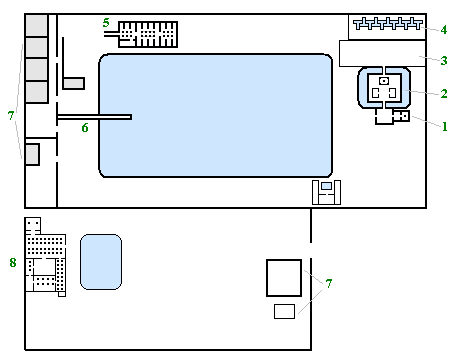
Plan of the complex 1: The sun temple 2: Sun chapel and two pavilions on an artificial island 3: Flower beds 4: T-shaped water tanks 5: Palace 6: Quay 7: Houses 8: Entrance hall

Maru-Aten, short for Pa-maru-en-pa-aten (The Viewing-Palace-of-the-Aten), is a palace or sun-temple located 3 km to the south of the central city area of the city of Akhetaten (today's el Amarna). It is thought to have been originally constructed for Akhenaten's queen Kiya, but on her death her name and images were altered to those of Meritaten, his daughter.

This site is now lost beneath modern fields, but was excavated first by Alessandro Barsanti in 1896 and more fully by Leonard Woolley in 1921.

The Maru-Aten consists of two adjacent enclosures, one slightly larger than the other. Both enclosures contained shallow pools and garden areas planted with trees. Some interesting features of the sunshade include:

- The larger of the lakes held a long and narrow causeway with a pier. On one end was a decorated kiosk.
- The north-east corner of the large enclosure shows an artificial island surrounded by water. On the island a stone platform with offering tables was erected (2 on the plan).
- Behind the artificial island, a pillared structure provided shade to a collection on T-shaped water basins (number 4). The basins were surrounded by a gypsum pavement decorated with scenes from nature.
