= Claude Sicard =

French Jesuit priest and egyptologist (1677–1726)

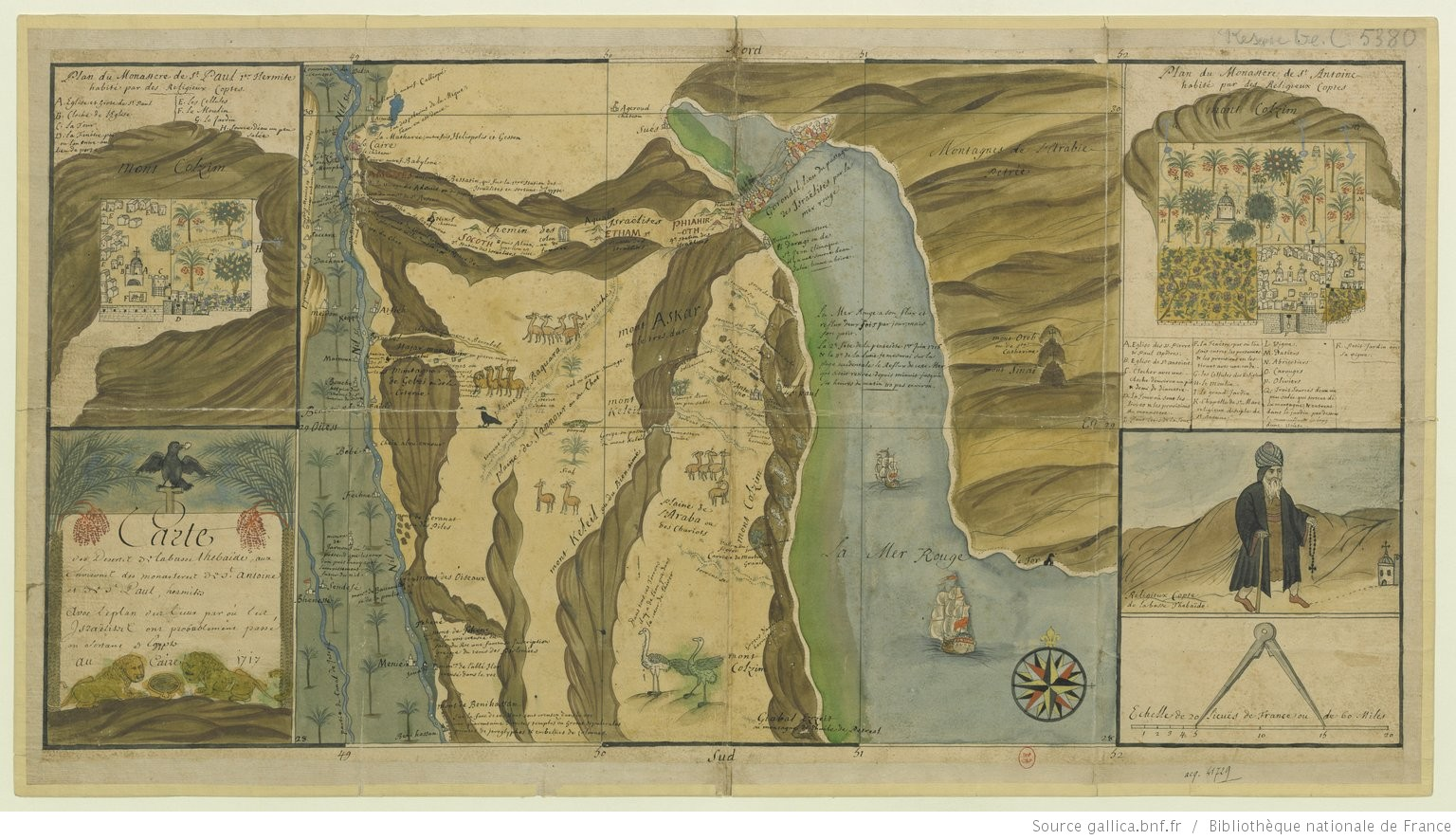
Sicard's 1717 map of Egypt

Father Claude Sicard (1677–1726) was a French Jesuit priest, and an early modern visitor to Egypt, between 1708 and 1712.

Sicard was a scholar and at the age of 22 was a professor in the seminary at Lyon. He was well educated in Latin, Greek, Coptic and Arabic. He was also skilled in cartography. His aim was to convert Egypt's Coptic Christians to Roman Catholicism.

Sicard was Supervisor of the Jesuit Mission in Cairo. He ate only vegetables and conformed to the Egyptian way of living for nine successive years.

He was the first European to locate Thebes. He identified the ruins of Karnak and Luxor as those of ancient Thebes. Sicard commented that "Its remains are magnificent and more extensive than it is possible to imagine."

Sicard died of plague from nursing the afflicted in 1726.

== Works ==
- Extrait de la Carte de l'Egypte ancienne du P. Sicard présentée à L. XV. Au Kaire l'an 17 .. (1722)
