= Ancient Records of Egypt =

Book series by James Henry Breasted

Ancient Records of Egypt is a five-volume work by James Henry Breasted, published in 1906, in which the author has attempted to translate and publish all the ancient written records of Egyptian history which had survived to the time of his work at the start of the twentieth century. (Breasted notes that his work covers only ancient “historical documents”, and generally does not include ancient Egyptian literature, religious writings, or texts on science, mathematics, or medicine.)

- Volume I, The First to the Seventeenth Dynasties
- Volume II, The Eighteenth Dynasty
- Volume III, The Nineteenth Dynasty
- Volume IV, The Twentieth to the Twenty-Sixth Dynasties
- Volume V, Indices

It was part of a proposed three-part set of translations of original texts by different authors, which at the time were difficult to find:

- History of Egypt (five volumes)
- History of Assyria (two volumes)
- History of Mesopotamia

Only the first two collections — those from Egypt and Assyria — were published.
