= Barry Kemp (Egyptologist) =

English archaeologist and Egyptologist (1940–2024)

Barry Kemp CBE FBA
- Born: 14 May 1940; Birmingham, England
- Died: 15 May 2024 (aged 84); Cambridge, England
- Spouse: Miriam Bertram
- Children: Nicola, Victoria, and Frances
- Parent(s): Ernest Kemp; Norah Lawless

Academic background
- Education: University of Liverpool (BA)

Academic work
- Discipline: Egyptologist
- Sub-discipline: Archaeology of Ancient Egypt; Amarna; Akhenaten
- Institutions: University of Cambridge; Wolfson College, Cambridge; McDonald Institute for Archaeological Research

Barry John Kemp, CBE, FBA (14 May 1940 – 15 May 2024) was an English archaeologist and Egyptologist. He was Professor of Egyptology at the University of Cambridge and directed excavations at Amarna in Egypt. His book Ancient Egypt: Anatomy of a Civilisation is a core text of Egyptology and many Ancient History courses.

== Life and education ==
Kemp was born to Ernest and Norah (nee Lawless) Kemp on 14 May 1940 in Birmingham. Kemp was married three different times and divorced twice. He was survived by his third wife Miriam Bertram. His father Ernest, was a traveling salesmen who also served his time in the Egyptian military in World War II. This is what sparked Kemp's curiosity with the Egyptian world. He studied Egyptology at the University of Liverpool, graduating with a Bachelor of Arts (BA) degree in 1962. Kemp dedicated his life to Egyptology and the advancement of excavations in Amarna. Kemp was actively always on his sites, carrying out excavations and publications up till his death in 2024. He died on 15 May 2024, in Cambridge, England, a day after his 84th birthday.

== Academic career ==
In 1962, Kemp joined the University of Cambridge as an assistant lecturer. He was promoted to lecturer in 1969, Reader in Egyptology in 1990, and made Professor of Egyptology in 2005. He was also a Fellow of Wolfson College, Cambridge from 1990 to 2007. He retired from full-time academia in 2007, and was made professor emeritus. Beginning in 2008, he was a senior fellow of the McDonald Institute for Archaeological Research at Cambridge. Kemp was always inspiring his students with new ideas and constant interest in the use of new methods.

=== Amarna Project ===
In 1977, Kemp founded the Amarna Trust which seeks to preserve the ancient city of Amarna, bringing awareness to Amarna and the surrounding regions. From 1977 until 2008, he was the director of excavation and archaeological survey at Amarna for the Egypt Exploration Society. He continued his research of the Amarna Period of ancient Egypt as director of the Amarna Project and secretary of the Amarna Trust. He also contributed to many highly regarded and widely used Egyptology texts, including Civilisations of the Ancient Near East, edited by Jack Sasson. He was a co-author of Bruce Trigger's Ancient Egypt: A Social History, which incorporates the work of many leading Egyptologists and addresses recent trends in the subject. Kemp stated he was interested in developing a holistic picture of Ancient Egyptian society rather than focussing on the elite culture that dominates the archaeological record: "This holistic approach involves explaining the present appearance of the site in terms of all the agencies at work..." Kemp's contributions to Egyptology reinvented it as a social science. Kemp's work in the excavation at the site of Amarna gave new information about the religion, and diets of ancient Egyptian citizens. Kemp challenged the works prior to him with the idea that Egyptians weren't entirely devout. Kemp's contributions to the excavation at the site of Amarna was one of his biggest accomplishments, he shed light on how smaller Egyptian civilizations functioned. Towards the latter half of his life Kemp shifted his focus to the site of the Great Aten Temple in a neighboring village.

== Honors ==
Kemp was elected Fellow of the British Academy (FBA) in 1992. He was appointed Commander of the Order of the British Empire (CBE) in the 2011 New Year Honours for services to archaeology, education and international relations in Egypt. Kemp was inspirational and a dedicated professor always adding his new ideas about Egyptian civilizations.

== Publications ==
  - Kemp, Barry, 1977. A Building of Amenophis III at Kôm el-'Abd The Journal of Egyptian Archaeology, Vol. 63. (1977), pp. 71–82 PDF
  - Barry Kemp (1977). The city of el-Amarna as a source for the study of urban society in ancient Egypt in World Archaeology 9, 123–39.
  - Kemp, Barry J. 1977. The City of El-Amarna as a Source for the Study of Urban Society in Ancient Egypt World Archaeology, Vol. 9, No. 2, Architecture and Archaeology (Oct., 1977), pp. 123–139 PDF
  - Barry Kemp (1981). The character of the South Suburb at Tell el-'Amarna. Mitteilungen der Deutschen Orient-Gesellschaft zu Berlin 113, 81–97.
  - Barry Kemp (1983). Tell el-'Amarna. In H.S. Smith and R.M. Hall, ed., Ancient Centres of Egyptian Civilization, pp. 57–72. London: Egyptian Education Bureau.
  - Barry Kemp (1986). Tell el-Amarna, 4000 word entry in the Lexikon der Ägyptologie, ed. W. Helck and W. Westendorf, Band VI. Wiesbaden: Harrassowitz, 309–19.
  - Barry Kemp (1989). Ancient Egypt: Anatomy of a Civilisation (1st ed.).
  - Barry Kemp (1992). Amarna from the air. Egyptian Archaeology 2, 15–17.
  - Barry Kemp, Soil and brick architecture in Ancient Egypt, pp. 78–103
  - Barry Kemp, "Meretaten's Bathroom," The Ostracon 7.3 (Fall 1996): pp. 1–5 PDF
  - Barry Kemp (1998). More of Amarna's city plan. Egyptian Archaeology 13, 17–18.
  - Barry Kemp (2000). Bricks and metaphor. Cambridge Archaeological Journal 10, 335–46. A comparative essay on the theme 'Were cities built as images?'.
  - Barry Kemp (2005). 100 Hieroglyphs: Think Like an Egyptian. Granta Books. ISBN 1-86207-658-8.
  - Barry Kemp (2005). Ancient Egypt: Anatomy of a Civilisation (2nd ed.). Routledge. ISBN 0-415-23550-2.
  - Barry Kemp (2007). The Egyptian Book of the Dead. Granta Books. ISBN 978-1-86207-913-7.
  - Barry Kemp (2012). The City of Akhenaten and Nefertiti: Amarna and Its People. Thames & Hudson. ISBN 978-0-500-29120-7.
  - Kemp, Barry & Zink, Albert, 2012 “Life in Ancient Egypt: Akhenaten, the Amarna Period, and Tutankhamun.” In: “Sickness, Hunger, War, and Religion: Multidisciplinary Perspectives,” edited by Michaela Harbeck, Kristin von Heyking, and Heiner Schwarzberg, RCC Perspectives 2012, no. 3, pp. 9–23. PDF
  - Barry Kemp (2015). Ancient Egypt: All that matters. Quercus. ISBN 978-1-44418620-8.
  - Barry Kemp, The Royal Tombs of Amarna, January 2016 issue of the Akhetaten Sun, the newsletter of the Amarna Research Foundation of Denver, Colorado. 12 pages PDF
  - Barry Kemp (2018). Ancient Egypt: Anatomy of a Civilisation (3rd ed.). Routledge. ISBN 9781351166485.

== Amarna Reports Webpage & Amarna Project Horizons Webpage ==
  - (Amarna Reports II): Barry Kemp (site supervisor) Chapter 4-Report on the 1984 excavations Chapel Group 528-531 1984 excavation, 12 pages PDF
  - (Amarna Reports IV): Barry Kemp (site supervisor), Chapter 6-Report on the 1986 Excavations: Chapel 556 1986 excavation, 17 pages PDF
  - (Amarna Reports VI): Barry Kemp, Chapter 4-Site Formation Processes and the Reconstruction of House P46.33 1987 excavation, 23 pages PDF
  - (Amarna Reports VI): Barry Kemp, Chapter 15-Outlying temples at Amarna 1987 excavation, 52 pages PDF
  - Horizon: The Amarna Project and Amarna Trust Newsletter, Barry Kemp, Carved limestone fragments from the Great Aten Temple (pp.14-18) Issue 18, Autumn 2017 PDF
  - Horizon: The Amarna Project and Amarna Trust Newsletter, Barry Kemp, Miniature Landscapes at Amarna (pp.5-6) Issue 17, Spring 2016 PDF
  - Horizon: The Amarna Project and Amarna Trust Newsletter, Barry Kemp The Great Aten Temple as newly revealed (pp.2-10) Issue 19, Autumn 2018, PDF
  - Horizon: The Amarna Project and Amarna Trust Newsletter, Barry Kemp, Amarna’s waterfront buildings and the context of building O43.1 (pp.14-21) Issue 21, Spring 2021 PDF
  - Horizon: The Amarna Project and Amarna Trust Newsletter, Barry Kemp & Corinna Rossi, Quarry size and building size at Amarna (pp.15-21) Issue 22, Summer 2022, PDF
  - Amarna Boundary Stela by Barry Kemp Archived
  - The Akhetaten Sun, Barry Kemp, EES Field Director's Report Spring 2001 (pp.2-19) Vol.5 No.2 September 2001 PDF
  - The Akhetaten Sun, Barry Kemp, Amarna Excavations Update (pp.20-40) Vol.26 No.2 December 2020, PDF
  - The Akhetaten Sun, Barry Kemp, After the Founder: the Post-Amarna Period at Amarna (pp.1-32) Vol.28, No.1 June 2022 PDF

== Interview ==
- Interview: Barry Kemp on the Latest Findings of the Amarna Project, January 12, 2010, Heritage Key, Archived
