= JTN =

JTN may refer to:

- Aten (Egyptian: jtn), the disk of the sun in ancient Egyptian mythology
- Johnston Atoll (former ISO 3166-1 alpha-3 code: JTN)
