= Meryneith =

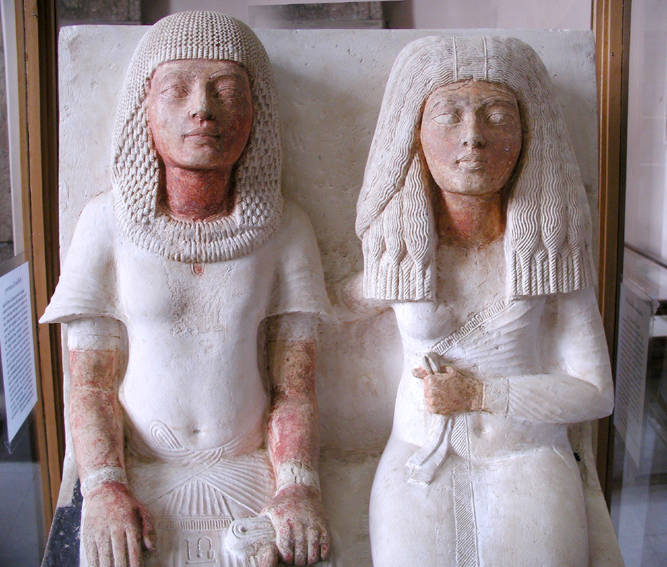
Painted limestone statue of Meryneith and his wife Iniuia

Meryneith (beloved of [the goddess] Neith), also named Meryre (beloved of [the sun-god] Re; died c. 1330 BC), was an ancient Egyptian official who lived in the Amarna Period. He is mainly known from his tomb found in 2001 at Saqqara. He is perhaps identical with the high priest of Aten Meryre, who is known from his tomb at Amarna.

Not much is known of Meryneith's family background. He was perhaps born under king Amenhotep III. His father was an official called Khaut. The name of his mother is not known. In the oldest parts of his tomb Meryneith bears the titles steward of the temple of Aten (imy-r pr n pr-jtn) and later steward of the temple of Aten in Memphis. This office Meryneith might have held at the beginning of the reign of pharaoh Amenhotep IV.

Perhaps around year 9 in the reign of pharaoh Amenhotep IV, Meryneith changed his name to Meryre. Under Amenhotep IV only the sun was worshipped and Meryneith was either forced to change his name or voluntarily changed his name to fit the new royal religious politics. In his tomb at Saqqara, the name Meryneith was in the inscriptions was changed to Meryre. Most likely under pharaoh Amenhotep IV he held the titles scribe of the temple of Aten in Akhet-Aten (and?) in Memphis and Greatest of seers of the Aten. The latter designation is the title of the high priest of Aten. A high priest of Aten with the same name is well known from his tomb at Amarna. It is possible that both Meryre's are the same person. At the end of his career, at the beginning of the reign of pharaoh Tutankhamun, he moved back to Memphis, Egypt and changed his name to Meryneith. According to the Egyptian Museum, "The inscriptions in his tomb make clear that he changed his name from Meryneith to Meryre (and back again) in order to adjust to the prevailing political climate." His Saqqara tomb has a rare private painted limestone statue (JE 99076) of Meryneith or Meryre and his wife "still fixed to the floor in its original location in the south-western chapel of the tomb." He now became first priest of Neith. It seems that Meryneith died in the early years of Tutankhaten's reign. Most parts of the decoration of his tomb were finished in these years. It is possible that he ended his career in dishonor since he was never buried in his tomb. In the burial chambers of his tomb, no parts of any objects or funerary equipment with his name were discovered.
