= Meryre =

Ancient Egyptian high priest of Aten

Meryre (I)
- High Priest of the Aten
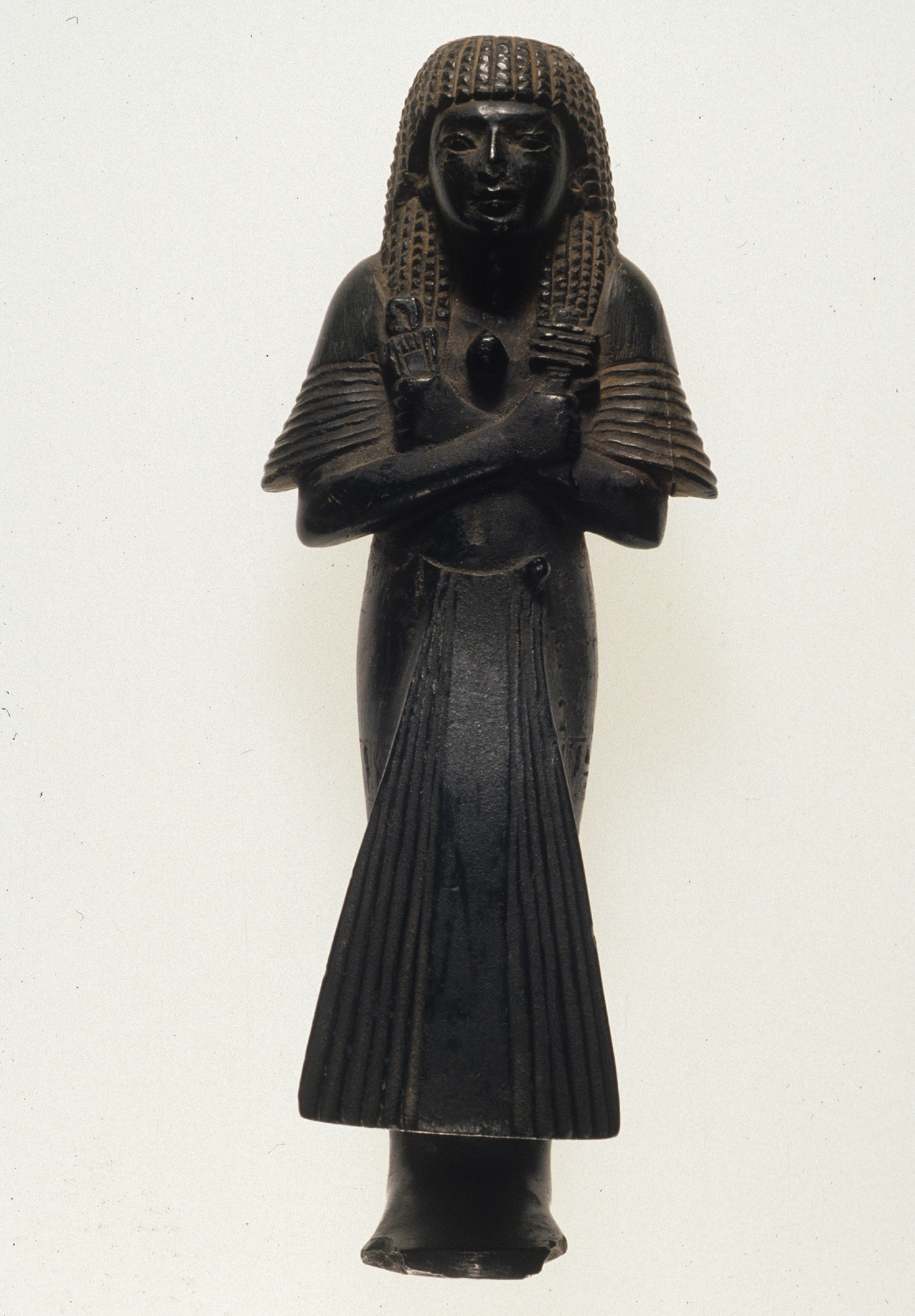
- A shabti of Meryre (reign of Akhenaten)
Egyptian name
N5 Z1 U6 i i A51
- Dynasty: 18th Dynasty
- Pharaoh: Akhenaten
- Burial: Amarna Tomb 4

Meryre (also Meryra or Merire) (Ancient Egyptian: mrii-rˤ "the one loved by Re") was an Egyptian noble and the only certain High Priest of the Aten. Amongst his other titles were Hereditary Noble and High Official and Fan-bearer on the Right Side of the King which emphasise his closeness to the king.

He had a tomb constructed at Amarna, Tomb 4, although his remains have never been identified. (See Tombs of the Nobles.)

It is possible that he is identical to an official known from a Memphite tomb. This official appears in his tomb with two names: Meryneith and Meryre. The latter name he was bearing in the Amarna period, while Meryneith was his name before this period and after. In his inscriptions Meryneith bears also the title of a high priest of Aton.

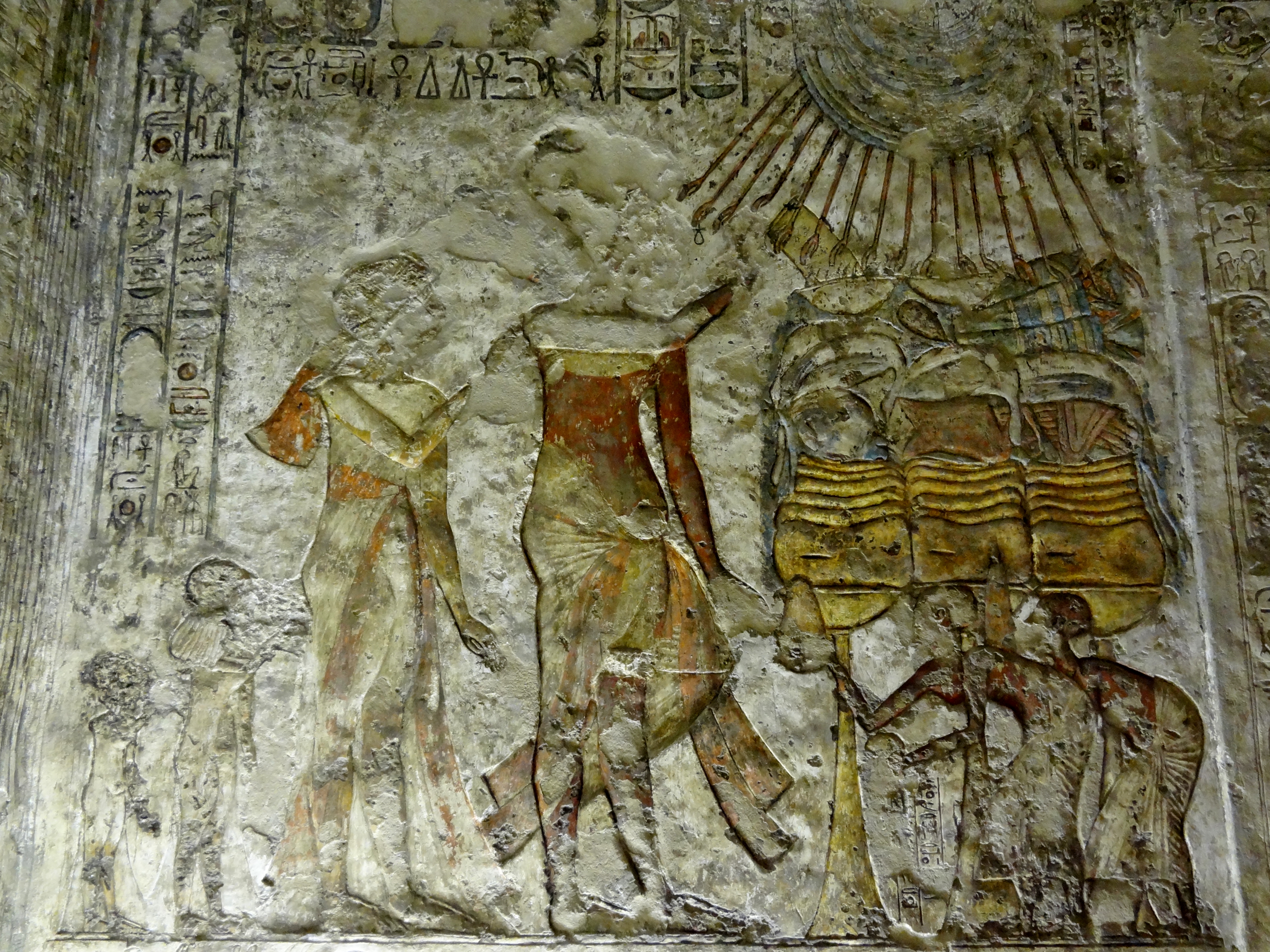
Defaced scenes of Akhenaten and Nefertiti in Meryre's Amarna tomb.

== See also ==
- Meryneith

== Literature ==
- J. H. Breasted, Ancient Records of Egypt, Chicago 1906, Part Two, §§.982-988
