= Tomb of Meryra =

Ancient Egyptian tomb

Coordinates: 27°39′50″N 30°55′39″E

Amarna Tomb 4
- Burial site of Meryra
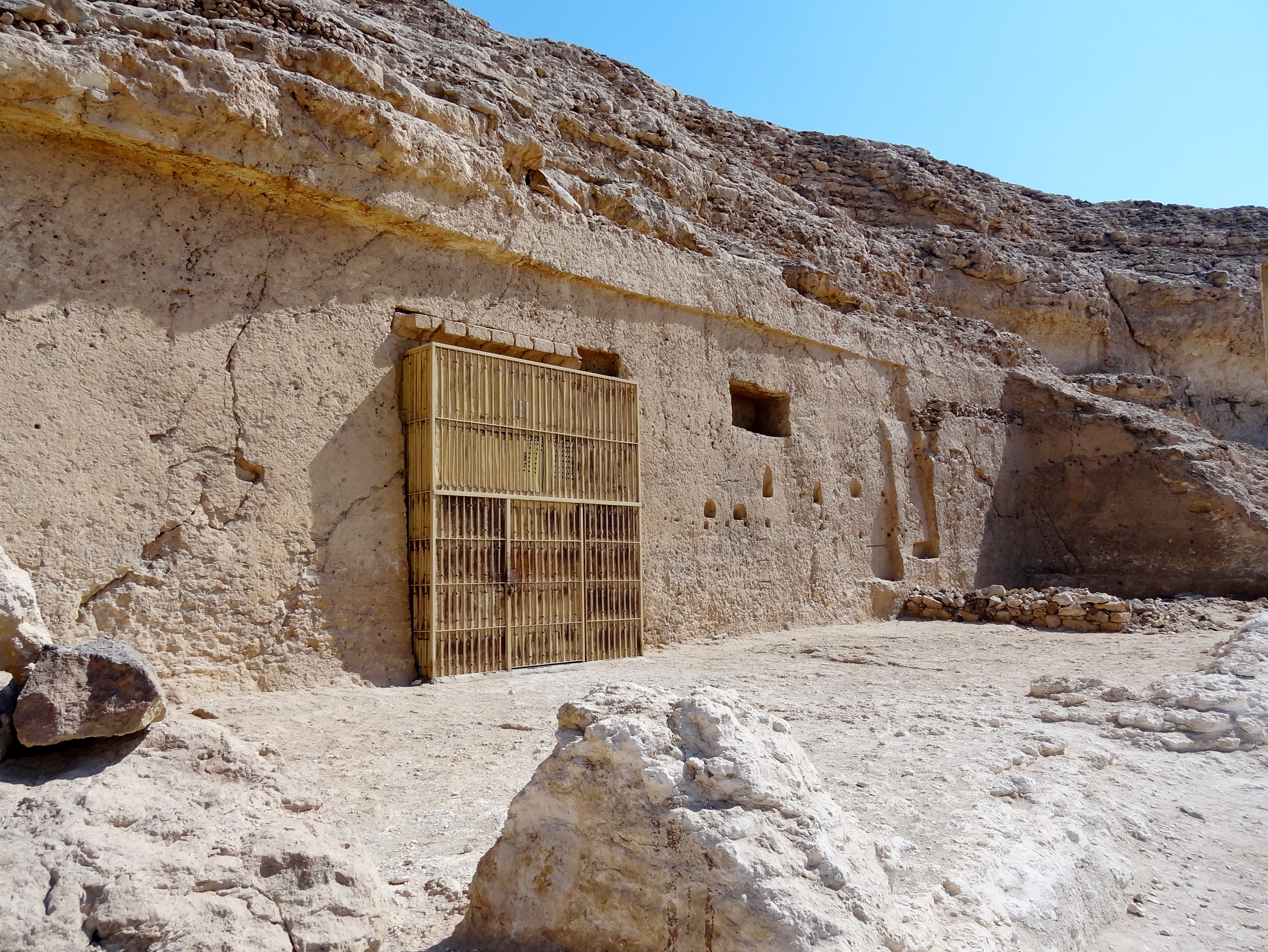
- Exterior of the tomb, showing modern security gate

- Location within Egypt
- Location: Northern tomb of the nobles, Amarna
- ← Previous; Amarna Tomb 3 Next → Amarna Tomb 5

The tomb of Meryra is part of a group of tombs located in Amarna, Upper Egypt. Placed in the cliffsides, the graves are divided into north and south groupings. Meryra's burial, identified as Amarna Tomb 4, is located in the northern cluster. The tomb chapel is the largest and most elaborate of the noble tombs of Amarna. It, along with the majority of these tombs, was never completed. The rock cut tombs of Amarna were constructed specifically for the officials of King Akhenaten in the 18th Dynasty. Norman de Garis Davies originally published details of the Tomb in 1903 in the Rock Tombs of El Amarna, Part I – The Tomb of Meryra.

The Amarna tombs still stand intact though in various states of weathering, iconoclasm, or deliberate defacing. They are each different in layout and depictions depending on their professions for the King yet many have repetitive patterns in common. Meryra's tomb shows detailed views of royal imagery and architectural views of The Great Aten Temple in both horizontal and vertical depictions. Meryra's tomb has a unique narrative because of his career as The High Priest of Aten.

== Meryra ==
mr r i i N5 Z1 A51
Meryra
in hieroglyphs
Era: New Kingdom
(1550–1069 BC)

Meryra served as the High Priest of the cult of Aten, a new religious tradition instituted by King Akhenaten. This belief system placed exclusive emphasis on sun worship in the form of Aten, or the solar disc, a deity encapsulating the idea of many gods into the essence of the sun. Meryra adopted the solar god "Ra" in his name to show his allegiance to Atenism. Meryra's gift of a tomb testifies to his worthiness to Akhenaten as perhaps the singular High Priest of Aten.

Not all officials at Amarna had tombs. Having a tomb at Amarna reflected closeness with Akhenaten, due, in part, to demonstrating a commitment to Akhenaten's institution of Atenism. The tomb provides information regarding the personal life of Meryra and The Great Temple of Aten. He had been promoted to Chief Priest of Aten at a high point in his career as a "Seer" of the Aten religion. He held the title "Fanbearer on The Right Hand of The King" as a status of his closeness to royalty.

Just inside the antechamber to the columned hall Meryra is shown in full-size depiction wearing four gold collars of honor around his neck. Familial references are limited to depictions of his wife, Tenra, who is depicted directly opposite making offerings and described as “A Great Favorite of the Lady of the Two Lands." Lady of the Two Lands refers to Nefertiti, the queen of Akhenaten. A queen image in a tomb is rare in Egyptian tomb art yet Nefertiti has large images with different crowns behind the King throughout all the Amarna tombs. However, this elevation of Tenra, a non-royal woman in full-size depiction is unique to all the other Amarna tombs. She wore white linen, a fillet, and had a perfume cone on her head that mirrors the head decoration of New Kingdom burial art.

== Tomb layout ==
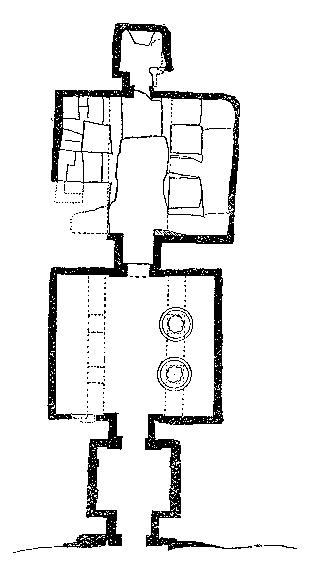
Plan of the tomb

The tomb was found in relatively good condition compared to the other tombs of Amarna. After the death of Akhenaten, depictions of his rule and religion were destroyed because they were considered to be heretical. In Meryra's tomb, Akhenaten and Nefertiti’s features have been consistently erased but their bodies and gestures can still be seen in the chisel marks beneath the Aten's rays for location. The desecration is confined to these individuals, and the names and figures of the princesses remain untouched.

The tomb consists of four sections: the antechamber, the hall of columns, a second hall, and the shrine. There were originally four columns holding up the ceiling in the hall of columns but two were removed during the Coptic era. The second hall and the shrine were never completed. However, architecturally it is possible to see where the original cubed blocks were about to be extracted from the outer hall and where more columns were started and left incomplete. The entrance to the tomb was originally decorated with inscriptions to the Amarna Royal family and the deity Aten. These decorations have either been destroyed, or are hidden by the modern doors protecting the tomb entrance.

The antechamber itself shows Meryra offering prayers to the Akhenaten, and the five cartouches of the king, Nefertiti and the Aten. The door jambs are inscribed with funerary prayers for Akhenaten and the Aten. The entrance from the antechamber to the outer hall is the location of the two walls decorated with Meryre adoring the Short Hymn to the Aten, and shows Meryre's wife Tenre making offerings to the sun-disc. Because of this antechamber, Meryra has six full-size depictions of him. More than any other Amarna tomb owner.

== Tomb decorations ==
The sculptured reliefs of Meryra's tomb were done in a new artistic style instituted under Akhenaten. The technique of modeling in plaster which was used consisted of the images initially being cut in sunken relief directly into the stone for lasting effect and then covered by a layer of plaster, which was finally painted over. Like the style, the subject of the scenes was also unique. There are six walls that cover five subjects.

Traditionally, tombs in the New Kingdom contained decorations dedicated to the owner of the tomb, such as depictions of family members and ancestors, or scenes about the owner's career, amusement or domestic life. This tradition was not carried out in the tomb of Meryra, or the other tombs of Amarna, which instead focused almost exclusively on Akhenaten and worship of the Aten. Davies acknowledges the tombs of Amarna were often difficult to identify as little emphasis was placed on the owner. This contrasts sharply with the dominant tradition of New Kingdom tombs in which cartouches and images of the ruling king were marginal aspects to the tomb, sometimes not even identified.

The reliefs in the Tomb of Meryra are decidedly centered upon praising Akhenaten, and Meryra himself only appears marginally, sometimes indistinguishable from other minor figures carved in the relief. Despite this, Meryra maintains a constant contextual presence in the scenes, even if not being explicitly portrayed.

== Descriptions of the walls ==
=== South- Eastside Wall ===
==== Davies titled this subject "The Royal Family Making Offerings To The Sun" ====
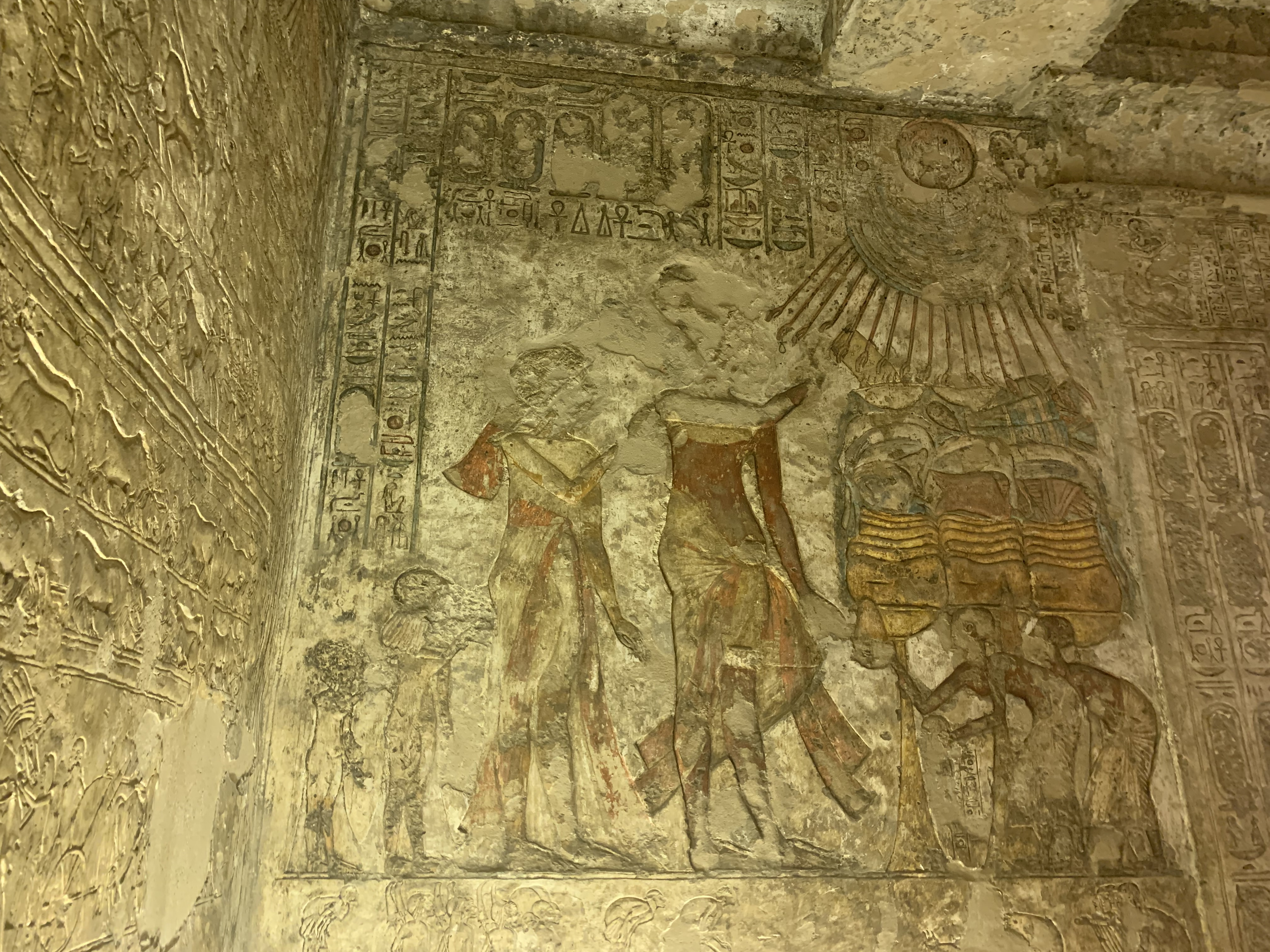
Nefertiti and Akhenaten worshipping Aten

The color still remains on this family scene of Akhenaten and Nefertiti in large scale depicted in front of food offerings at a large altar. It captures the "Offering King" pattern before the banquet table that is repeated many times in the Amarna tombs. It has strategic placement as you enter the tomb in modern times because this scene is opposite the entrance and the first scene that catches your eye because of the brownish-red polychrome skin color on the royal figures and the contrasting white linen that drapes their bodies. The King and Queen raise their arms in adoration of the Aten over the abundance but their faces and crowns have been greatly damaged.

The two princesses, Meritaten and Meketaten are depicted following their mother but playing ritual sistrums. The large altar of the bounty of the kingdom is blessed by an unusual drawing of the Aten with two blue and red arcs below the sun disc. The Royals offer a blessing to the Aten but in Akhenaten's reformations, Meryra is depicted as a tiny figure bowing beneath an altar meant for him.

=== East Wall ===
==== Davies titled this subject "The Investiture of Meryra as High Priest" ====
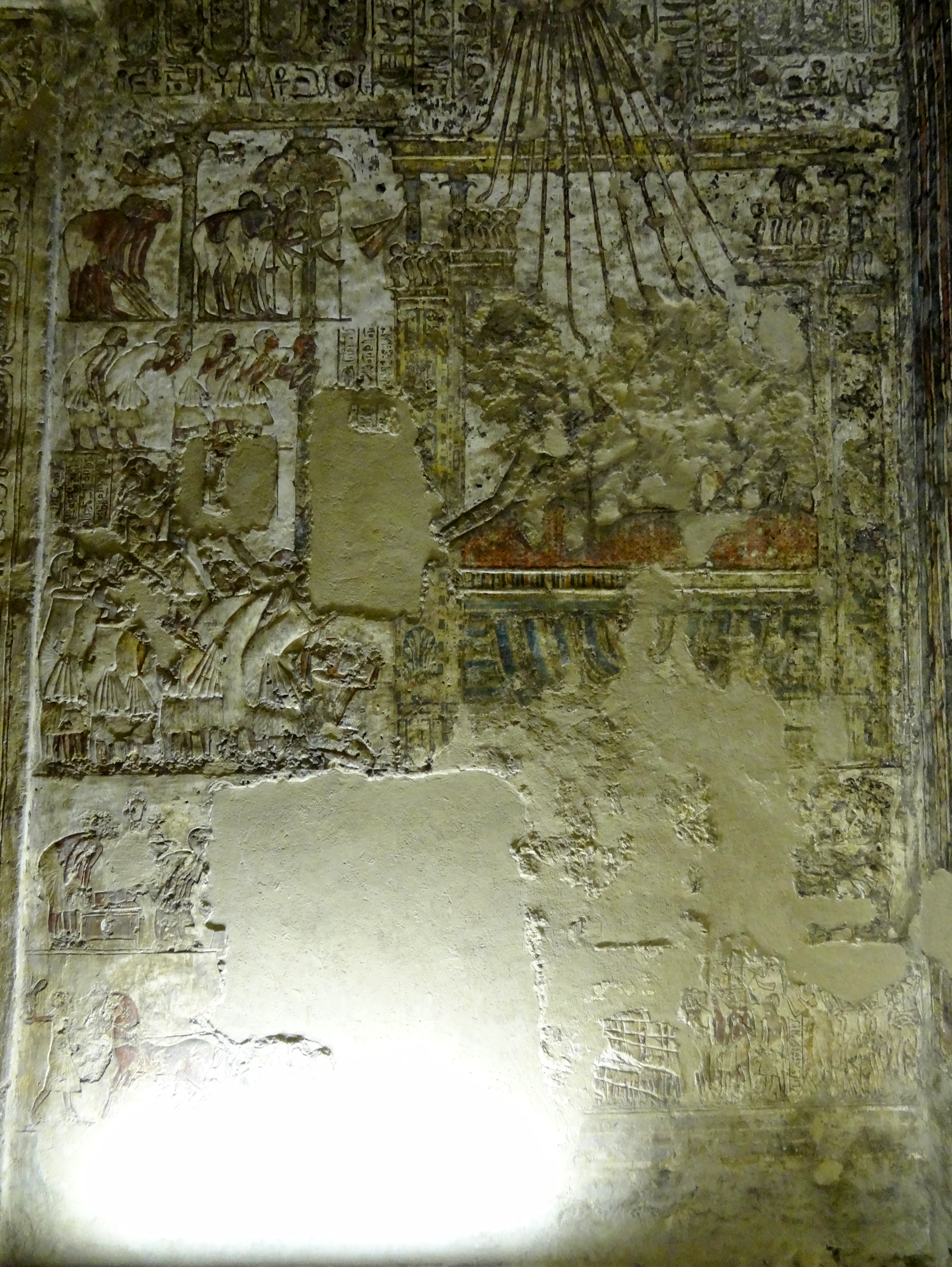
Akhenaten and Nefertiti rewarding Meryra from the Window of Appearances

In the immediately preceding scene, Akhenaten and Nefertit are depicted honoring Meryra in full-scale but most of the color has faded from this entire long wall. The plastered white walls still capture the royal figures in two places. The scene depicts the King bestowing the office on Meryra in the pattern of "King as Benefactor" at Great Aten Temple. Akhenaten officially declares Meryra as the High Priest of Aten. Despite being the High Priest of Aten, Meryra was not recognized with the power to access the Aten, an exclusive ability of Akhenaten. He is shown bestowed with gold collars of fortune, tiny but everlasting.

In the text of this relief, Akhenaten addresses Meryra with the proclamation, "Behold, I am attaching you to myself, to be the Greatest of Seers of the Aten, in the House of Aten, in Ahket-aten." In this statement, the reliance on Akhenaten in Atenism is referred to in a physical sense, as Akhenaten pledges to "attach" Meryra to him. This is similar to the contact the royal family has with the Aten, which is furnished with hands holding ankhs extending from its rays. One purpose of the ankhs is to literally fill the recipient through the senses of smell to breathe in life and touch for protection in prosperity of the Aten.

==== Davies titled this subject 'The Royal Family Worshipping in The Temple" ====
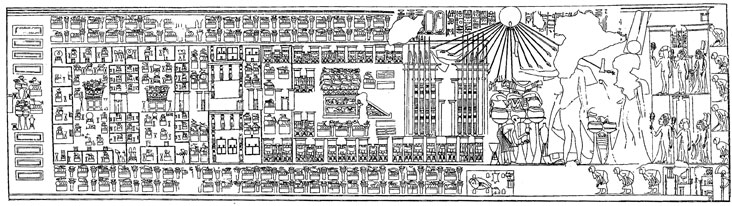
The royal family worshiping at the Great Aten temple

There are two large scale views of the royals on this wall in lower register as described previously and the higher register, which show Akhenaten and Nefertiti at one of the temples along with their princesses in ritual performance. The Amarna tombs depict buildings in great detail. Meryre's tomb shows views of the Long Temple in the Great Aten Temple with the hundreds of altars and the palaces and their architectural elements. A horizontal view of The Great Aten Temple is engraved on this wall showing the flagpoles and gateways. Meryra's tomb also shows a busy life in the Central City in this tomb.

=== West-Wall ===
==== In the scene Davies titles "A Royal Visit to the Temple" ====
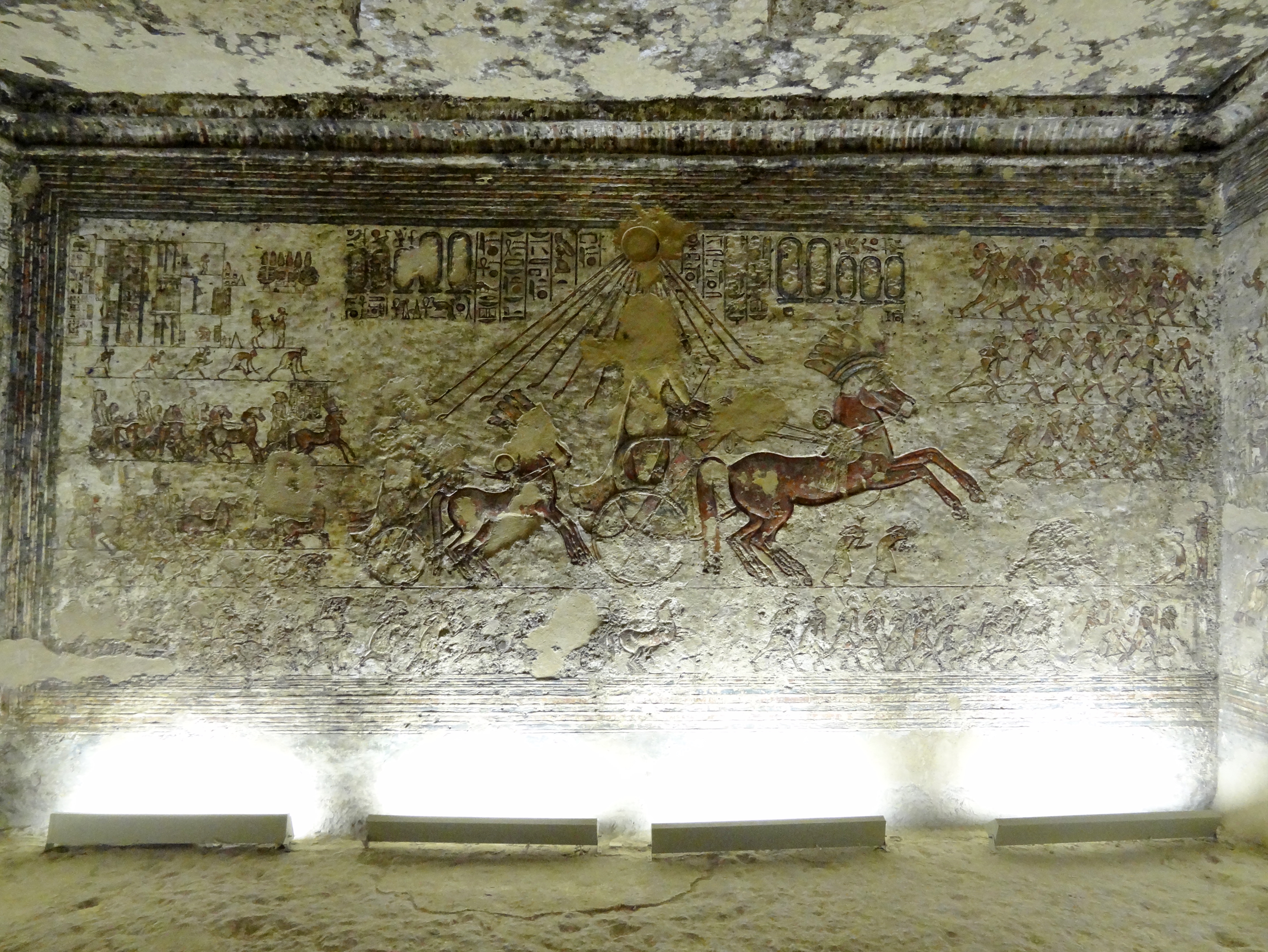
Defaced images of Nefertiti and Akhenaten driving their chariots

The polychrome color is still visible on the centered scene of Akhenaten leading Nefertiti depicted driving golden chariots. Even though the themed pattern of "Royals in Chariots," is seen in a variety of sculptures five more times in four other Amarna tombs; this one in Meryra's tomb of the horses rising in unison reminds one of the rising of Aten which is mentioned in the Boundary Stelae. The two brown horses are depicted wearing colored ostrich plumes and bridled and strapped. The images of the royals are obliterated in the scene though we see where they were in their chariots and beneath the rays of the Aten's rays.

This is a unique view of Nefertiti or any queen holding the reins of her own horse and chariot. However, they are followed by their four princesses in their own golden chariots and the full retinue of assistants following them in registers behind them leaving the palace. It is uncertain if Meryra is included in this image and the description of the scene has been destroyed. Davies speculates that the scene either shows Akhenaten on his way to the temple to appoint Meryra as the High Priest of Aten, or it is simply an example of Meryra honored with the presence of the King and Queen at the temple and exercising his office for them. Either situation serves to promote the role and importance of Meryra, even though the scene seems to be immediately focused upon Akhenaten.

The final theme in register on this wall is Meryra in the pattern of "Returning Home," which is detailed in most Amarna tombs. He is shown returning to his own estate in his own chariot displaying his gold collars for his household in a dynamic depiction of female musicians playing instruments and bowing servants and other priests all welcoming him back as he arrives. As the art was not focused upon Meryra, maintaining a strong contextual importance allowed for Meryra to still be bestowed with honor and praise.

=== West Wall-Northside ===
This processional begins at the palace and ends in a vertical depiction of The Great Aten Temple. This is a particularly detailed view of the workings and architectural elements of the temple. Davies described it as a "bird's eye view" pointing to the ancient artist's license as if no walls and ceiling blocked your view.

== After Amarna ==
At the death of Akhenaten, the city of Ahketaten was abandoned in approximately three years after succession of various Amarna pharaohs like Smenkare, Neferneferuaten and, finally Tutankhamun. It is possible that Meryra moved back to Memphis as a Steward at The Temple of Aten there. He is known as Meryneith from his tomb found in 2001 at Saqqara. The name means "Beloved of Neith," as he became "The First Priest of Neith."

A variety of texts were found in the tomb, including prayers to be said by visitors to the tomb, as well as religious texts, such as the Hymn to the Aten. The Great Hymn to the Aten, traditionally said to be written or sung by Akhenaten himself celebrates the Aten as the universal creator of all life. Although similar to hymns to Amun, the Hymn to the Aten reflects the originality of Akhenaten's simplistic perception of his solar religion.

== Gallery ==
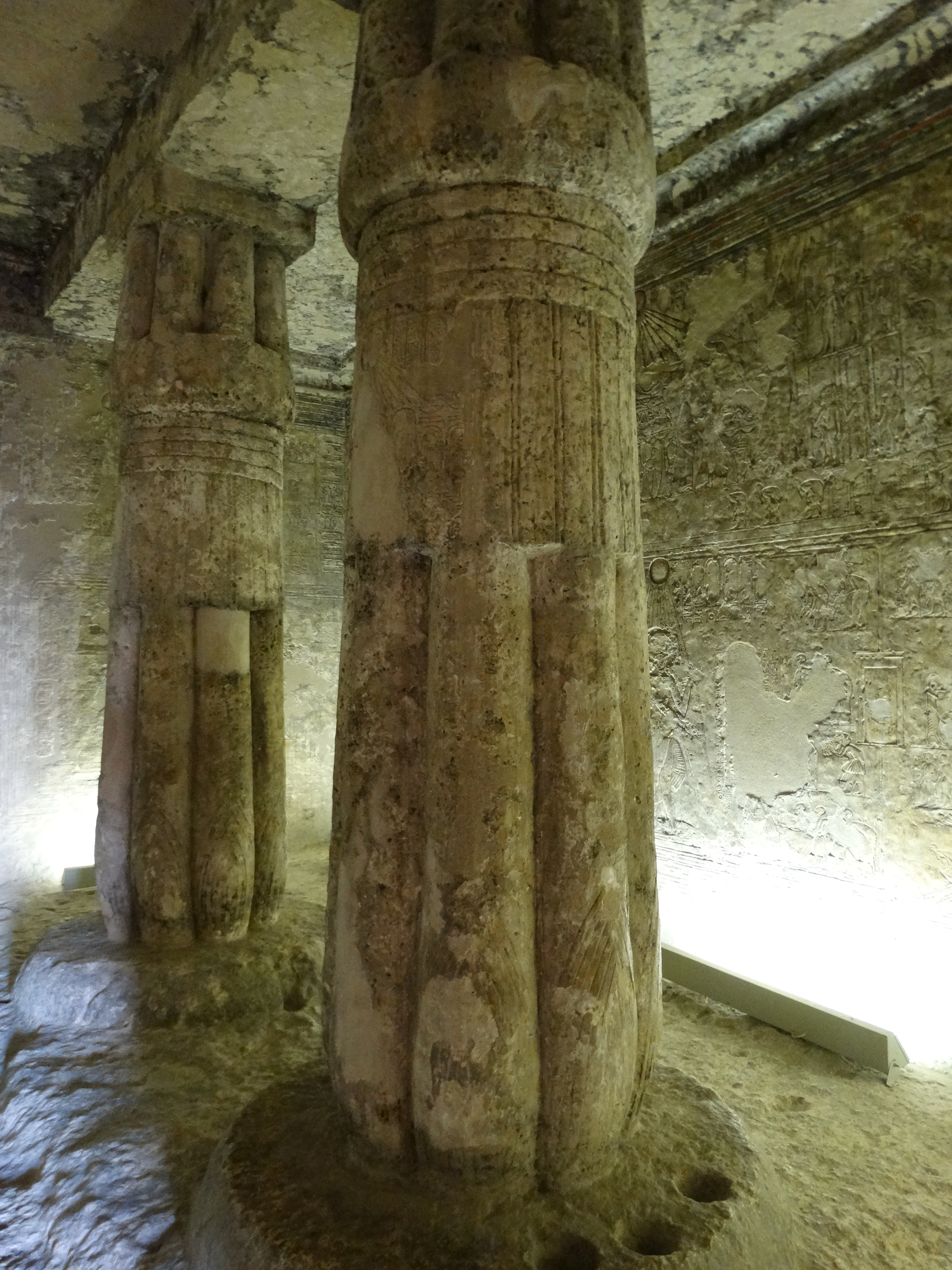
Two papyrus shaped stone columns in Meryre's tomb

== See also ==
- Tombs of the Nobles (Amarna)
