= Aten =

Ancient Egyptian god

- Aten as it was depicted in the Amarna Period
Name in hieroglyphs
i t n N5(See other names written a double cartouche)
- Venerated in: Atenism
- Major cult center: Akhetaten, archaeological site known as Tell-el Amarna
- Symbol: Sun disk, reaching rays of light
- Temples: Great Temple of the Aten, Small Aten Temple

Aten, also Aton, Atonu, or Itn (Ancient Egyptian: jtn, reconstructed *[ˈjaːtin]) was the focus of Atenism, the religious system formally established in ancient Egypt by the late Eighteenth Dynasty pharaoh Akhenaten. Exact dating for the Eighteenth Dynasty is contested, though a general date range places the dynasty in the years 1550 to 1292 BCE. The worship of Aten and the coinciding rule of Akhenaten are major identifying characteristics of a period within the Eighteenth Dynasty referred to as the Amarna Period (c. 1353 – 1336 BCE).

Atenism and the worship of the Aten as the sole god of ancient Egypt state worship did not persist beyond Akhenaten's death. Not long after his death, one of Akhenaten's Eighteenth Dynasty successors, Tutankhamun, reopened the state temples to other Egyptian gods and re-positioned Amun as the pre-eminent solar deity. Aten is depicted as a solar disc emitting rays terminating in human hands.

== Etymology ==
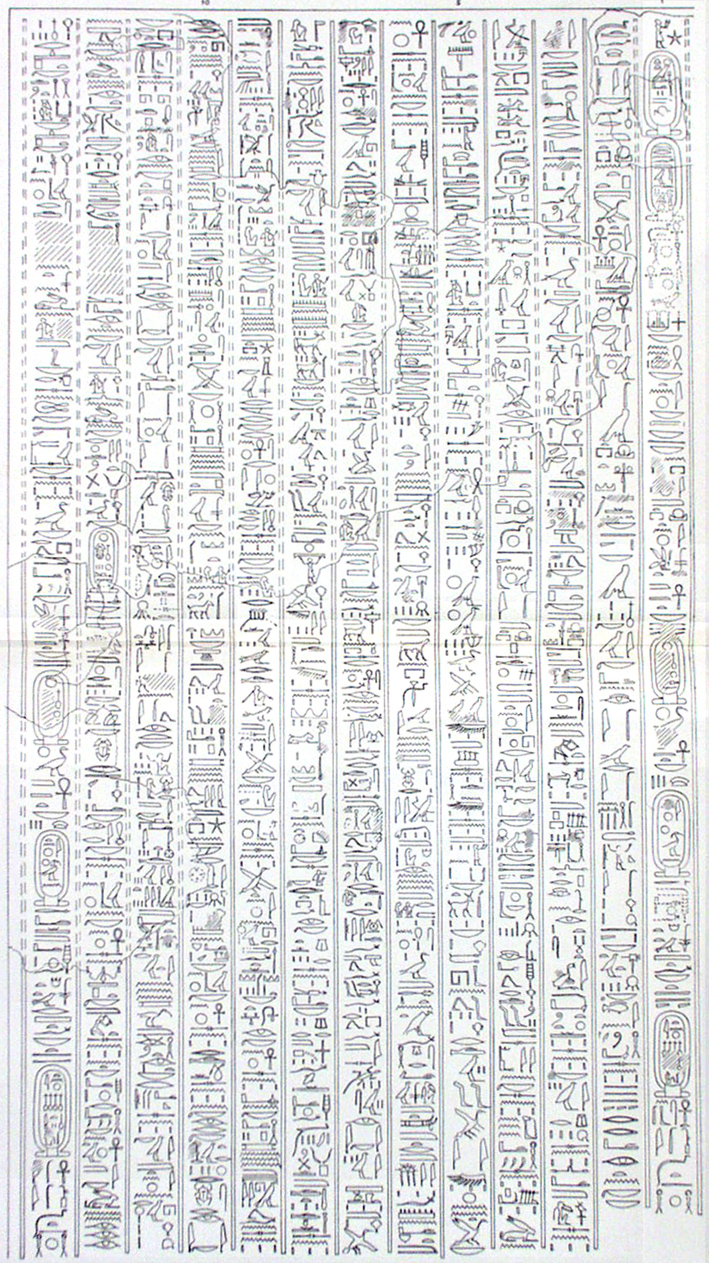
The "Great Hymn to the Aten" written from Akhenaten's point of view; the authorship of the hymn is disputed. Found in the tomb of Ay at Amarna. New Kingdom, Late 18th Dynasty. Amarna, Egypt.

The word Aten appears in the Old Kingdom as a noun meaning "disc" which referred to anything flat and circular; the sun was called the "disc of the day" where Ra was thought to reside. By analogy, the term "silver aten" was sometimes used to refer to the moon. High relief and low relief illustrations of the Aten show it with a curved surface. Therefore, the late scholar Hugh Nibley insisted that a more correct translation would be globe, orb or sphere, rather than disk.

== Origins ==
The Aten was the disc of the sun and originally an aspect of Ra, the sun god in traditional ancient Egyptian religion. Aten does not have a creation myth or family but is mentioned in the Book of the Dead. The first known reference to Aten the sun-disk as a deity is in The Story of Sinuhe from the 12th Dynasty, in which the deceased king is described as rising as a god to the heavens and "uniting with the sun-disk, the divine body merging with its maker".

While the Aten was worshiped under the reign of Amenhotep III, it was made the sole deity to receive state and official cult worship under his successor Akhenaten, though archaeological evidence suggests the closing of the state temples of other Egyptian gods likely did not stop household worship of the traditional pantheon. Inscriptions, such as the "Great Hymn to the Aten", found in temples and tombs during Akhenaten's reign showcase the Aten as the creator, giver of life, and nurturing spirit of the world.

== Religion ==
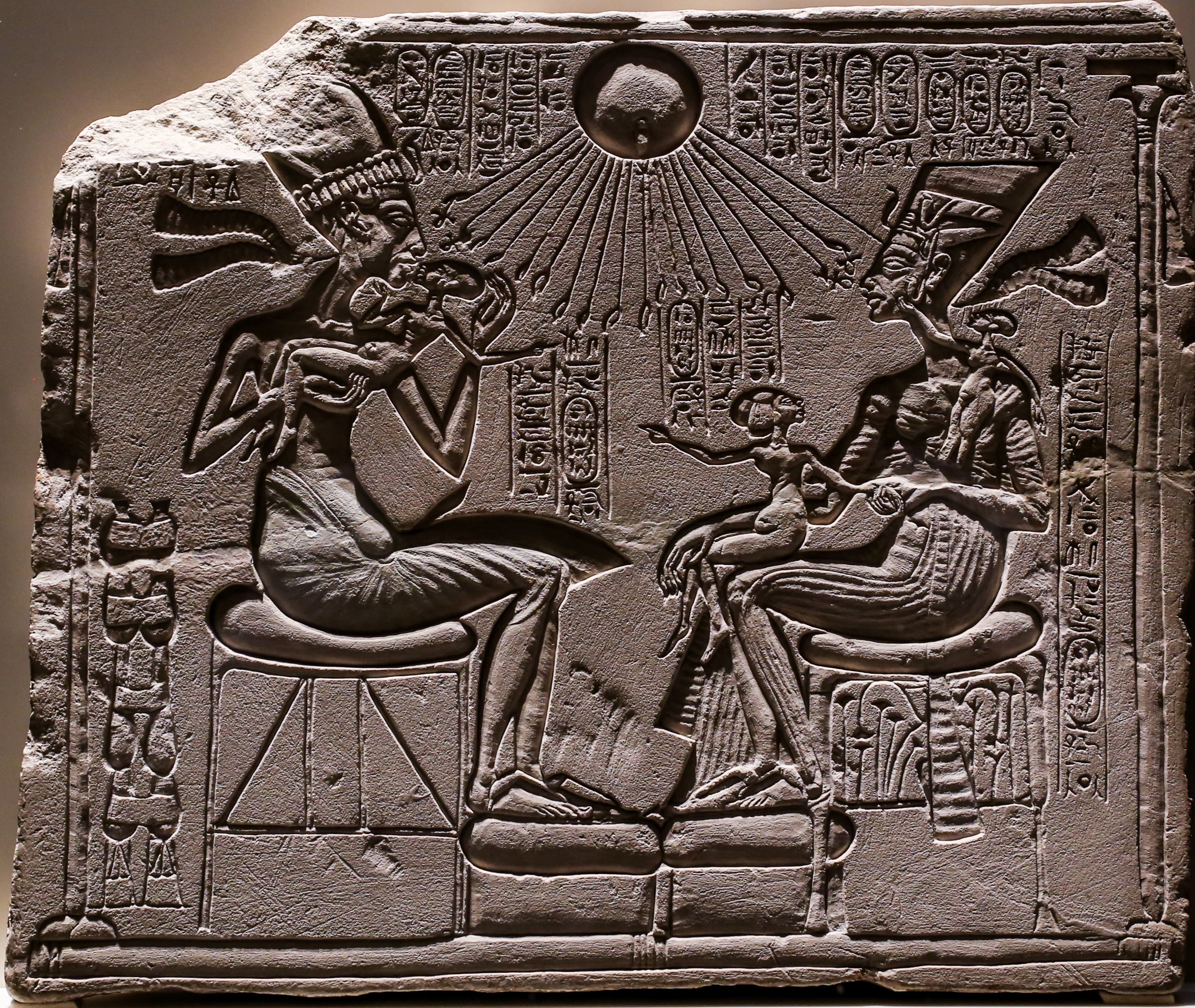
Relief depicting Akhenaten and Nefertiti with three of their daughters under the rays of Aten.

Aten was extensively worshipped as a solar deity during the reign of Amenhotep III where it was depicted as a falcon-headed god like Ra. While Aten was the preeminent creator deity of a pantheon of ancient Egyptian gods under Amenhotep III, it was not until his successor that Aten would be the only god acknowledged via state worship. During the reign of Amenhotep III's successor, Amenhotep IV, the Aten became the sole god of the Egyptian state religion, and Amenhotep IV changed his name to Akhenaten to reflect his close link with the supreme deity. The sole worship of Aten can be referred to as Atenism. Many of the core principles of Atenism were recorded in the capital city Akhenaten founded and moved his dynastic government to, Akhetaten, referred to as either Amarna, El-Amarna, or Tell el-Amarna by modern scholars.

In Atenism, night is a time to fear. Work is done best when the sun, and thus Aten, is present. The Aten created all countries and people, and cares for every creature. According to the inscriptions, the Aten created a Nile river in the sky (rain) for the Syrians. The rays of the sun disk only holds out life to the royal family, and because of this non-royals receives life from Akhenaten and Nefertiti, later Neferneferuaten, in exchange for loyalty to the Aten. In inscriptions, like the Hymn to the Aten and the King, the Aten is depicted as caring for the people through Akhenaten, placing the royal family as intermediaries for the worship of the Aten. There is only one known instance of the Aten talking.

In the Hymn to Aten, a love for humanity and the Earth is depicted in Aten's mannerisms:

Aten bends low, near the earth, to watch over his creation; he takes his place in the sky for the same purpose; he wearies himself in the service of the creatures; he shines for them all; he gives them sun and sends them rain. The unborn child and the baby chick are cared for; and Akhenaten asks his divine father to 'lift up' the creatures for his sake so that they might aspire to the condition of perfection of his father, Aten.

Akhenaten represented himself as the son of Aten, mirroring many of his predecessors' claims of divine birth and their positions as the embodiment of Horus. Akhenaten positioned himself as the only intermediary who could speak to Aten, emphasizing the dominance of Aten as the preeminent deity. This has led to discussion of whether Atenism should be considered a monotheistic religion, and thus making it one of the first examples of monotheism.

Aten is both a unique deity and a continuation of the traditional idea of a sun-god in ancient Egyptian religion, deriving a lot of the concepts of power and representation from the earlier solar deities like Ra, but building on top of the power Ra and many of his contemporaries represents. Aten carried absolute power in the universe, representing the life-giving force of light to the world as well as merging with the concept and goddess Ma'at to develop further responsibilities for Aten beyond the power of light itself.

== Worship ==
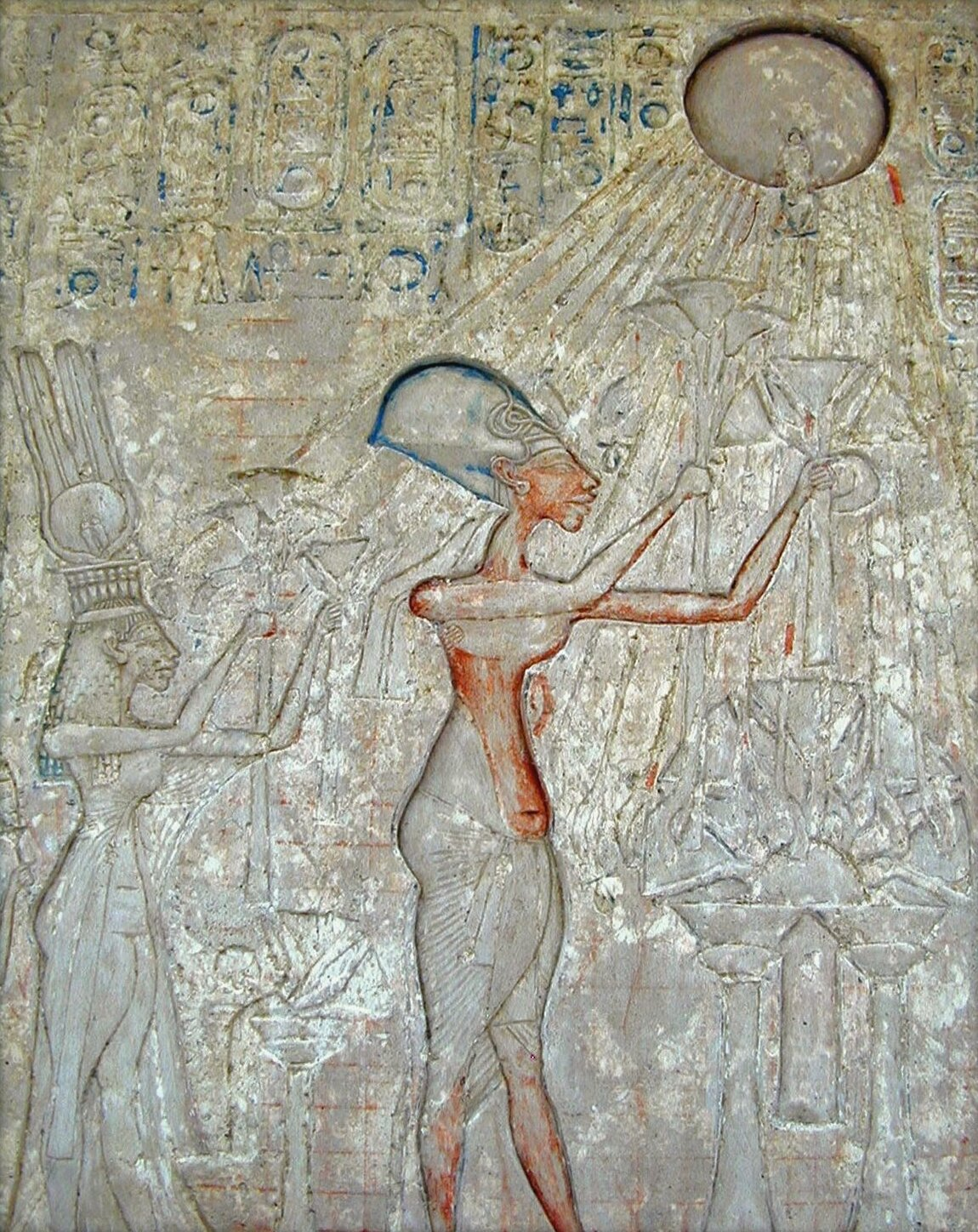
Inscription from the Royal Tomb of Amarna depicting Akhenaten, Nefertiti, and two of their daughters (obscured) worshipping, or 'adoring', the Aten. New Kingdom, late 18th Dynasty. Amarna, Egypt. The Egyptian Museum, Cairo.

The cult-center of the Aten was at the capital city Akhenaten founded, Akhetaten, though other cult sites have been found in Thebes and Heliopolis. The use of Amarna as a capital city and religious center was relatively short lived compared to the 18th Dynasty or New Kingdom as a whole as it was shortly abandoned after the death of Akhenaten. Inscriptions found on boundary stela accredited to Akhenaten discuss his desire to make the city a place of worship to Aten, dedicating the city to the god and emphasizing the royal residences' efforts in worship. Major principles of the Aten's cult worship were recorded via inscriptions on temples and tombs from the period. Straying significantly from the tradition of ancient Egyptian temples being hidden and more enclosed the further one went into the site, temples of Aten were open and did not have roofs in order to allow the rays of the sun inside. No statues of Aten were allowed as they were seen as idolatry. However, these were typically replaced by functionally equivalent representations of Akhenaten and his family venerating the Aten and receiving the ankh, the breath of life, from him. Compared to periods before and after the Amarna Period, Priests had less to do since offerings, such as fruits, flowers, and cakes were limited, and oracles were not needed.

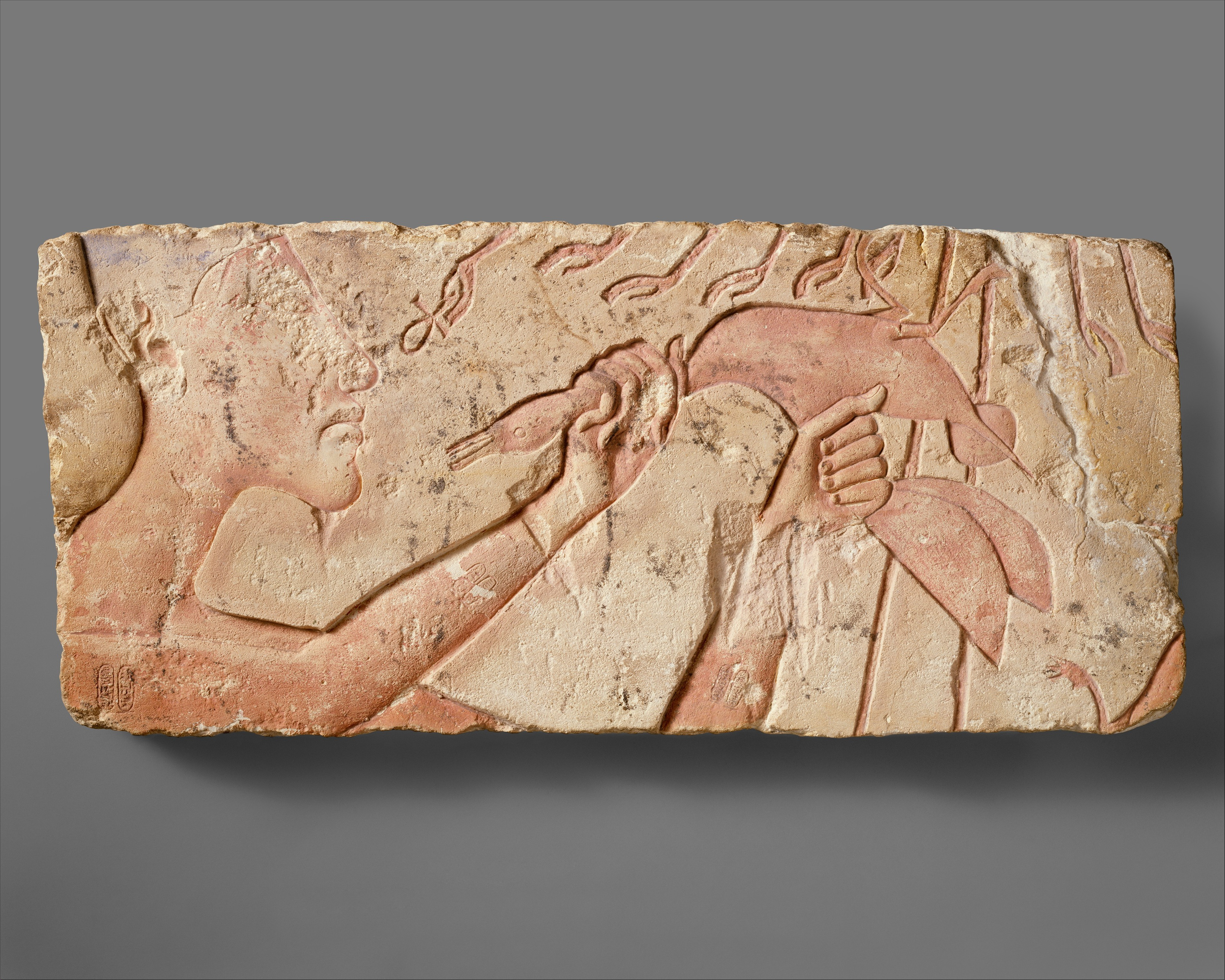
Akhenaten sacrificing a duck. New Kingdom, late 18th Dynasty. The Metropolitan Museum of Art, New York City.

In the worship of the Aten, the daily service of purification, anointment, and clothing of the divine image that is traditionally found in ancient Egyptian worship was not performed. Instead, incense and food-stuff offerings such as meats, wines, and fruits were placed onto open-air altars. A common scene in carved depictions of Akhenaten giving offering to Aten has him consecrating the sacrificed goods with a royal scepter. Instead of barque-processions, the royal family rode in a chariot on festival days. Elite women were known to worship the Aten in sun-shade temples in Akhetaten.

== Iconography ==
Aten was considered to have been everywhere and intangible as Aten was the sunlight and energy in the world. Therefore, he did not have physical representations that other traditional ancient Egyptian gods had, instead represented via the sun disc and reaching rays of light tipped with human-like hands. The explanation as to why the Aten could not be fully represented was that the Aten was beyond creation. Thus the inscriptions of scenes of gods carved in stone previously depicted animals and human forms instead showed the Aten as an orb above with life-giving rays stretching toward the royal figure. This power transcended human or animal form.

Later, iconoclasm was enforced, and even sun disc depictions of Aten were prohibited in an edict issued by Akhenaten. In the edict, he stipulated that Aten's name was to be spelled phonetically.

== Architecture ==
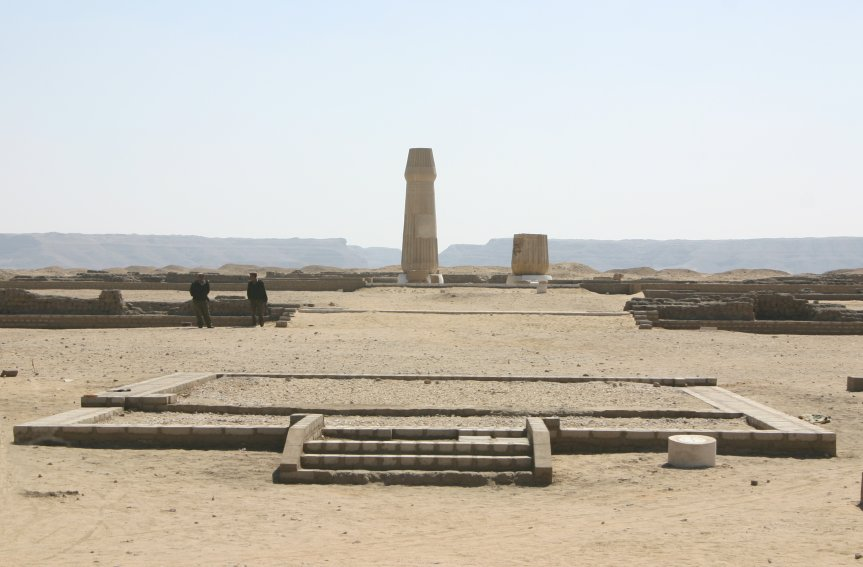
Ruins of the Small Temple of the Aten at Akhetaten, modern Amarna. Little of the original temple remains and several of the papyriform columns are modern recreations. New Kingdom, late 18th Dynasty. Amarna, Egypt.

Two temples were central to the city of Akhetaten. The larger of the two had an "open, roofless structure covering an area of about 800 by 300 metres (2,600 ft × 1,000 ft) at the northern end of the city". Doorways had broken lintels and raised thresholds. Temples to the Aten were open-air structures with little-to-no roofing to maximize the amount of sunlight on the interior making them unique compared to other Egyptian temples of the time. Balustrades depict Akhenaten and the royal family embracing the rays of the Aten flanked stairwells, ramps, and altars. These fragments were initially identified as stele but were later reclassified as balustrades based on the presence of scenes on both sides.

== Royal titulary ==
Inscriptions in tombs and temples during the Amarna Period often gave Aten a royal titulary enclosed in a double cartouche. Some have interpreted this to mean that Akhenaten was the embodiment of Aten, and the worship of Aten is directly worship of Akhenaten; but others have taken this as an indicator of Aten as the supreme ruler even over the current reigning royalty.

There were two forms of the title; the first had the names of other gods, and the second later one was more 'singular' and referred only to the Aten himself. The early form was "Re-Horakhti who rejoices in the Horizon, in his name Shu, which is the Aten." The later form was "Re, ruler of the two horizons, who rejoices in the Horizon, in his name of light, which is the Aten."

Early name	< S34 G9 N27 N27 V28 D36 Z1 Z1 Y1 Aa15 N27 > "Re-Horakhti who rejoices in the Horizon" < Aa15 r&n&f Aa15 H6 w N5 n t Z1 Z1 Aa15 i t n N5 > "in his name Shu, which is the Aten"
Late name	< S34 N5 S38 N27 N27 H a Z1 Z1 Aa15 N27 > "Re, ruler of the two horizons, who rejoices in the Horizon" < Aa15 r&n&f N5 t i M18 Aa15 i t n N5 > "in his name of light, which is the Aten"

== Question of monotheism ==
Ra-Horus, more usually referred to as Ra-Horakhty (Ra who is Horus of the two horizons), is a synthesis of two other gods, both of which are attested from very early on in ancient Egyptian religious practice. During the Amarna Period, this synthesis was seen as the invisible source of energy of the sun god, of which the visible manifestation was the Aten, the solar disk. Thus Ra-Horus-Aten was a development of old ideas which came gradually. The real change, as some see it, was the apparent abandonment of all other gods on the state level, especially Amun-Ra, prohibition of idolatry, and the debatable introduction of quasi-monotheism by Akhenaten. The syncretism is readily apparent in the Great Hymn to the Aten in which Re-Herakhty, Shu, and Aten are merged into the creator god. Others see Akhenaten as a practitioner of an Aten monolatry, as he did not actively deny the existence of other gods; he simply refrained from worshipping any but the Aten. Other scholars call the religion henotheistic.

== End of Atenism ==
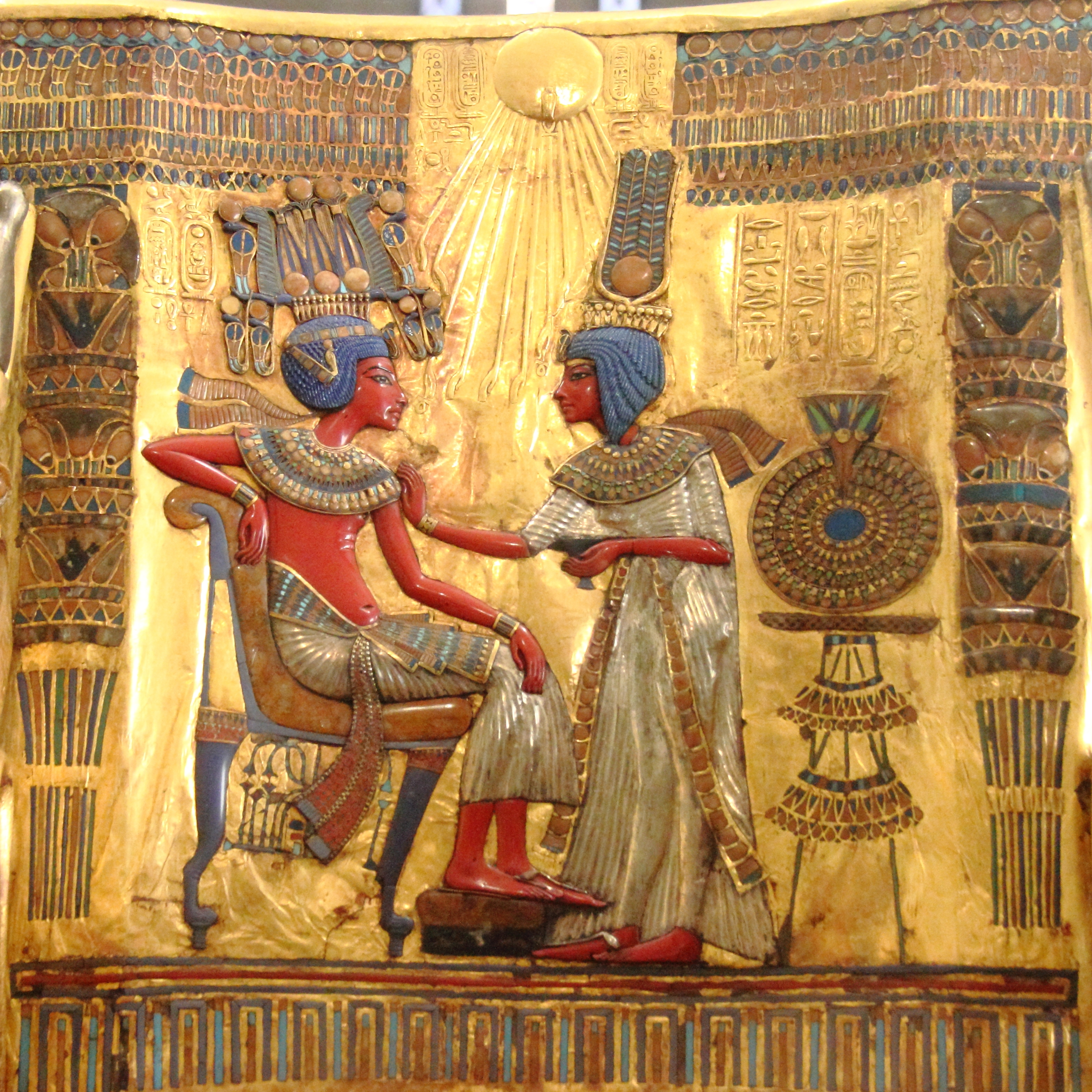
The Aten depicted in art from the throne of Tutankhamun, perhaps originally made for Akhenaten. New Kingdom, late 18th Dynasty. Amarna, Egypt. The Egyptian Museum, Cairo.

As pharaoh, Akhenaten was considered the 'high priest' or even a prophet of the Aten, and during his reign was one of the main propagators of Atenism in Egypt. After the death of Akhenaten, Tutankhamun reinstated the cult of Amun, and the ban on the state worship of non-Atenism deities was lifted in favor of a return to the traditional ancient Egyptian pantheon. The point of this transition can be seen in the name-change of Tutankhaten into Tutankhamun indicating the loss of favor in the worship of the Aten. While there was no purge of the cult after Akhenaten's death, the Aten persisted in Egypt for another ten years or so until it seemed to fade. When Tutankhamun came into power, his religious reign was one of tolerance, with the major difference being that the Aten was no longer the only god worshipped within official, state capacity. Tutankhamun made efforts to rebuild the state temples that were destroyed during Akhenaten's reign and reinstate the traditional pantheon of gods. This seemed to be "a move based publicly on the doctrine that Egypt's woes stemmed directly from its ignoring the gods, and in turn the gods' abandonment of Egypt".

=== Names derived from Aten ===
- Akhenaten: "Effective spirit of the Aten".
- Akhetaten: "Horizon of the Aten", Akhenaten's capital. The archaeological site is known as Amarna.
- Ankhesenpaaten: "Her life is of the Aten". Early name of Ankhesenamun.
- Beketaten: "Handmaid of the Aten".
- Meritaten: "She who is beloved of the Aten".
- Meketaten: "Behold the Aten" or "Protected by Aten".
- Neferneferuaten: "Beautiful are the beauties of Aten".
- Paatenemheb: "The Aten [is] in festival"
- Tutankhaten: "Living image of the Aten". Early name of Tutankhamun.

== Gallery ==
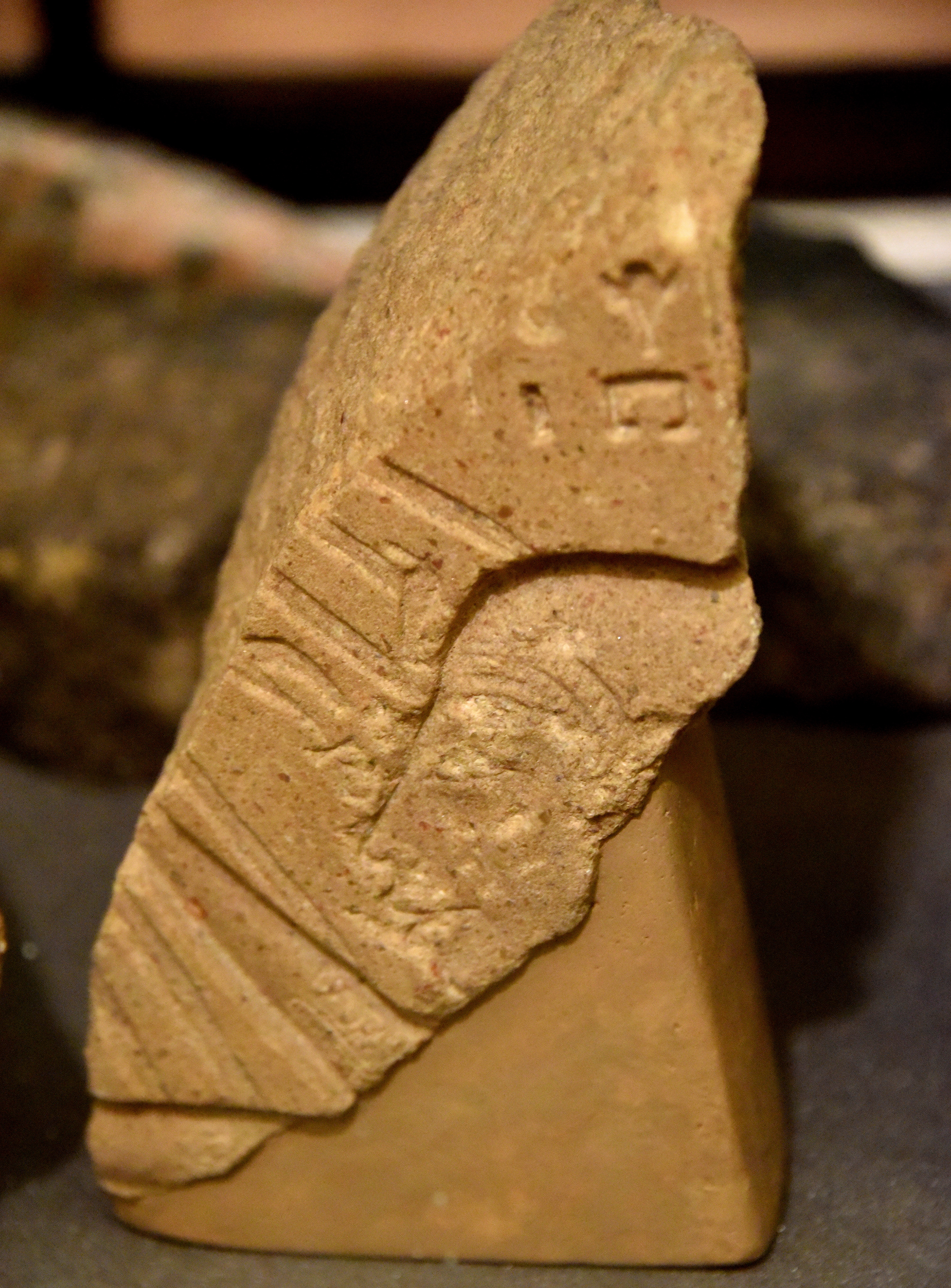
Relief fragment showing a royal head, probably Akhenaten, early form Aten cartouches, and Aten extending Ankh to the figure. Amarna, Egypt. New Kingdom, late 18th Dynasty. The Petrie Museum of Egyptian Archaeology, London

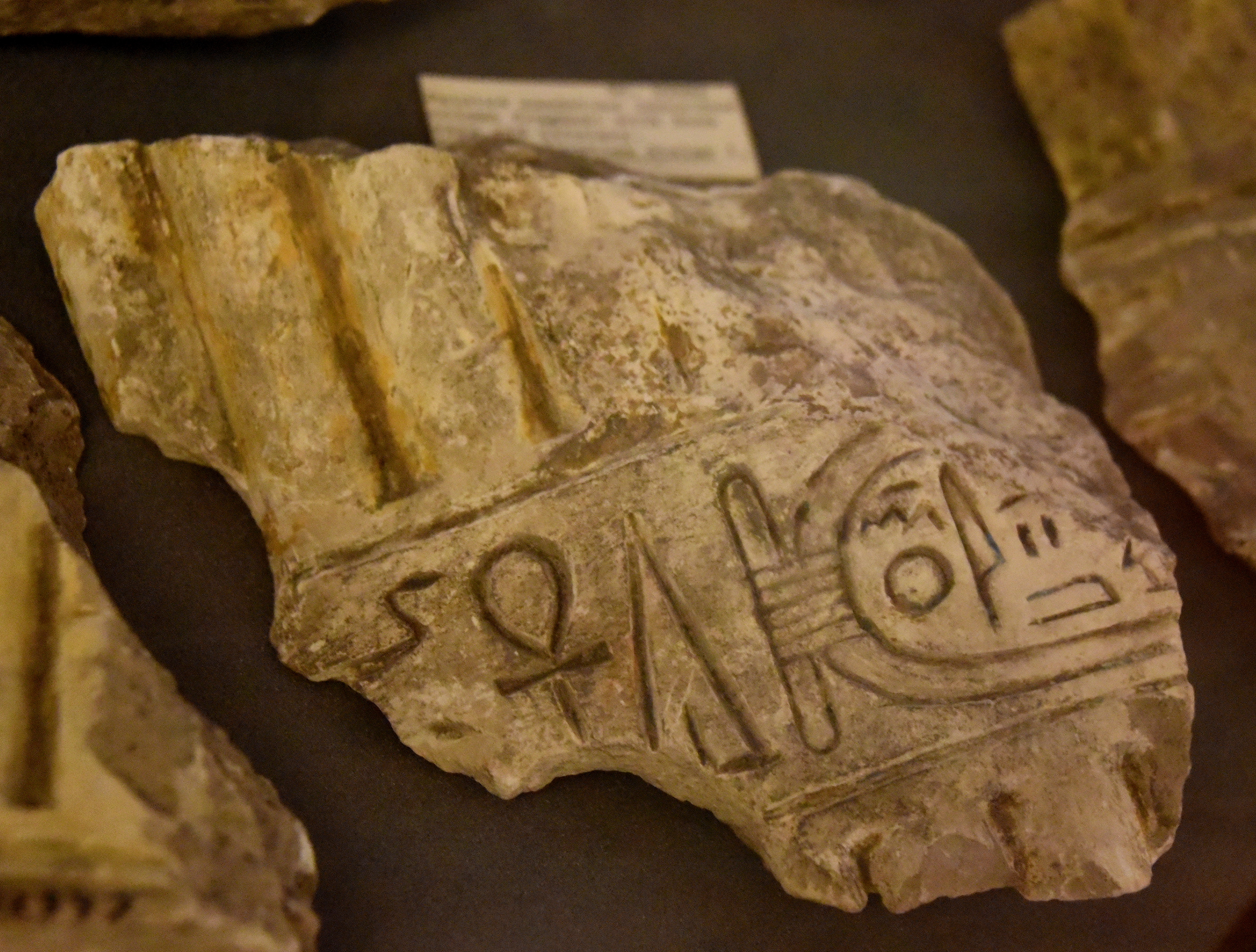
Limestone column fragment depicting reeds and an early form Aten cartouche. Reign of Akhenaten. Amarna, Egypt. New Kingdom, late 18th Dynasty. The Petrie Museum of Egyptian Archaeology, London

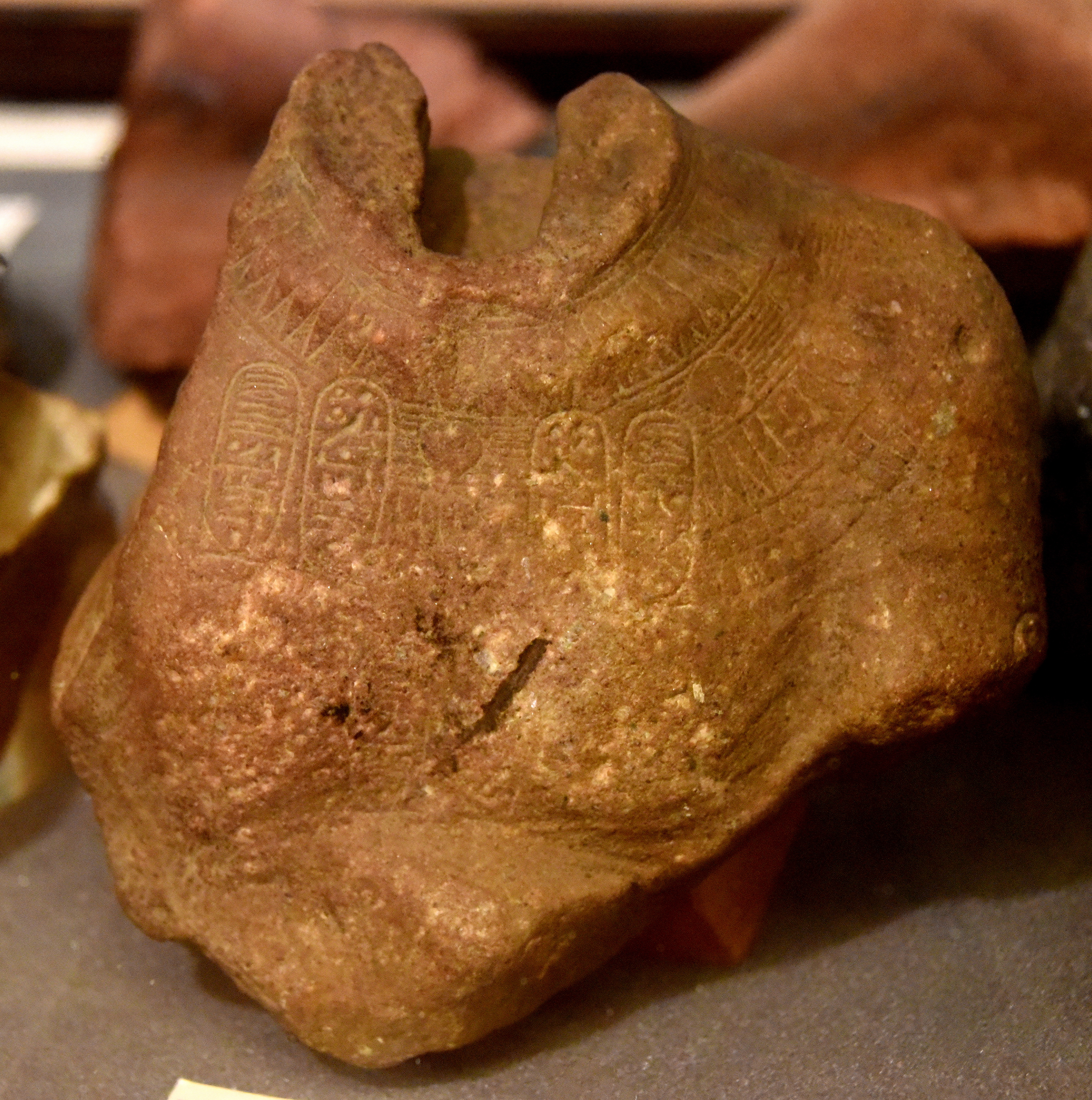
Headless bust of Akhenaten or Nefertiti with four pairs of early form Aten cartouches, once part of a composite red quartz site statue with indications of Intentional damage. Amarna, Egypt. New Kingdom, late 18th Dynasty. The Petrie Museum of Egyptian Archaeology, London

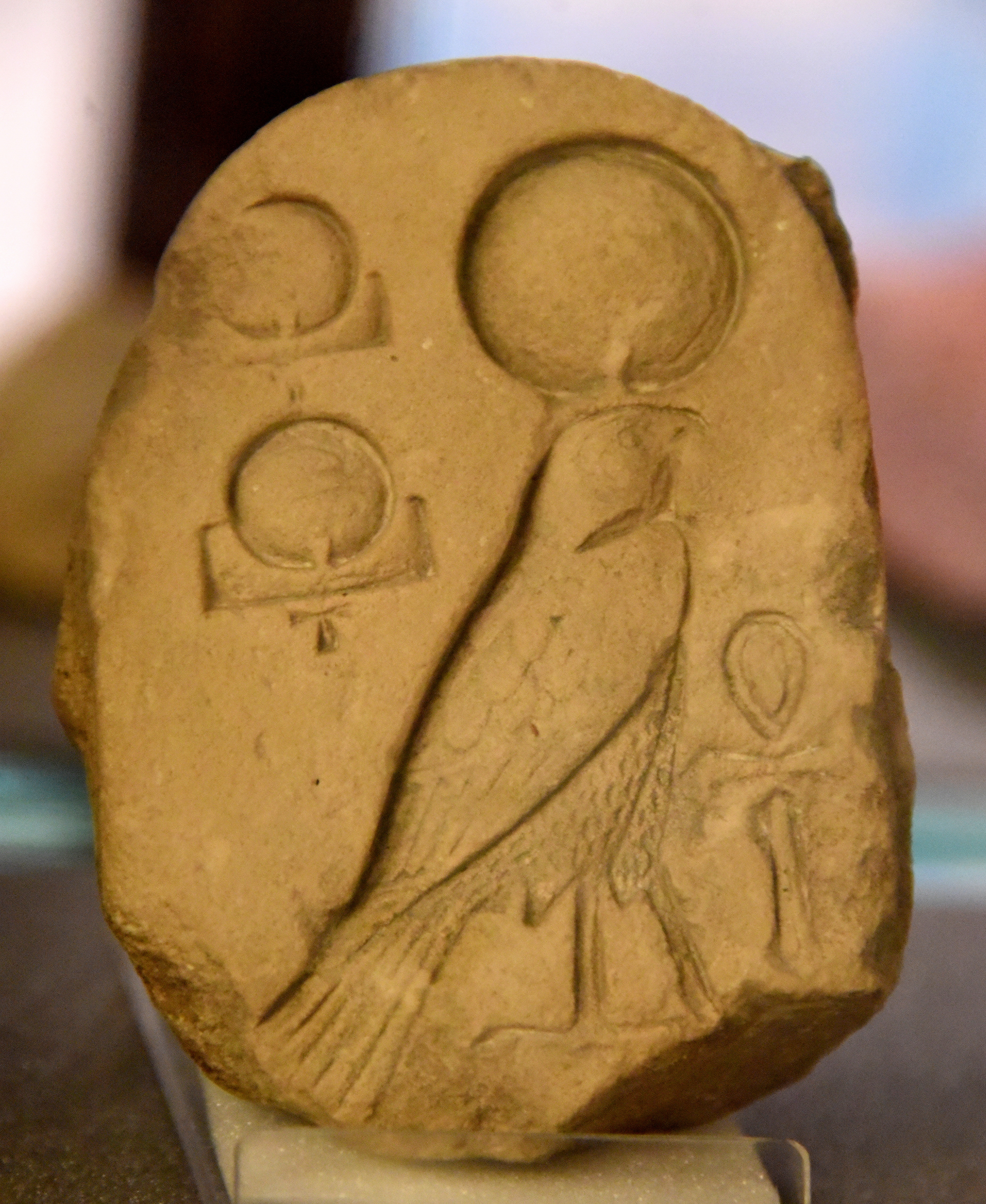
Inscribed limestone fragment showing early form Aten cartouches, "the Living Ra Horakhty". Amarna, Egypt. New Kingdom, late 18th Dynasty. The Petrie Museum of Egyptian Archaeology, London

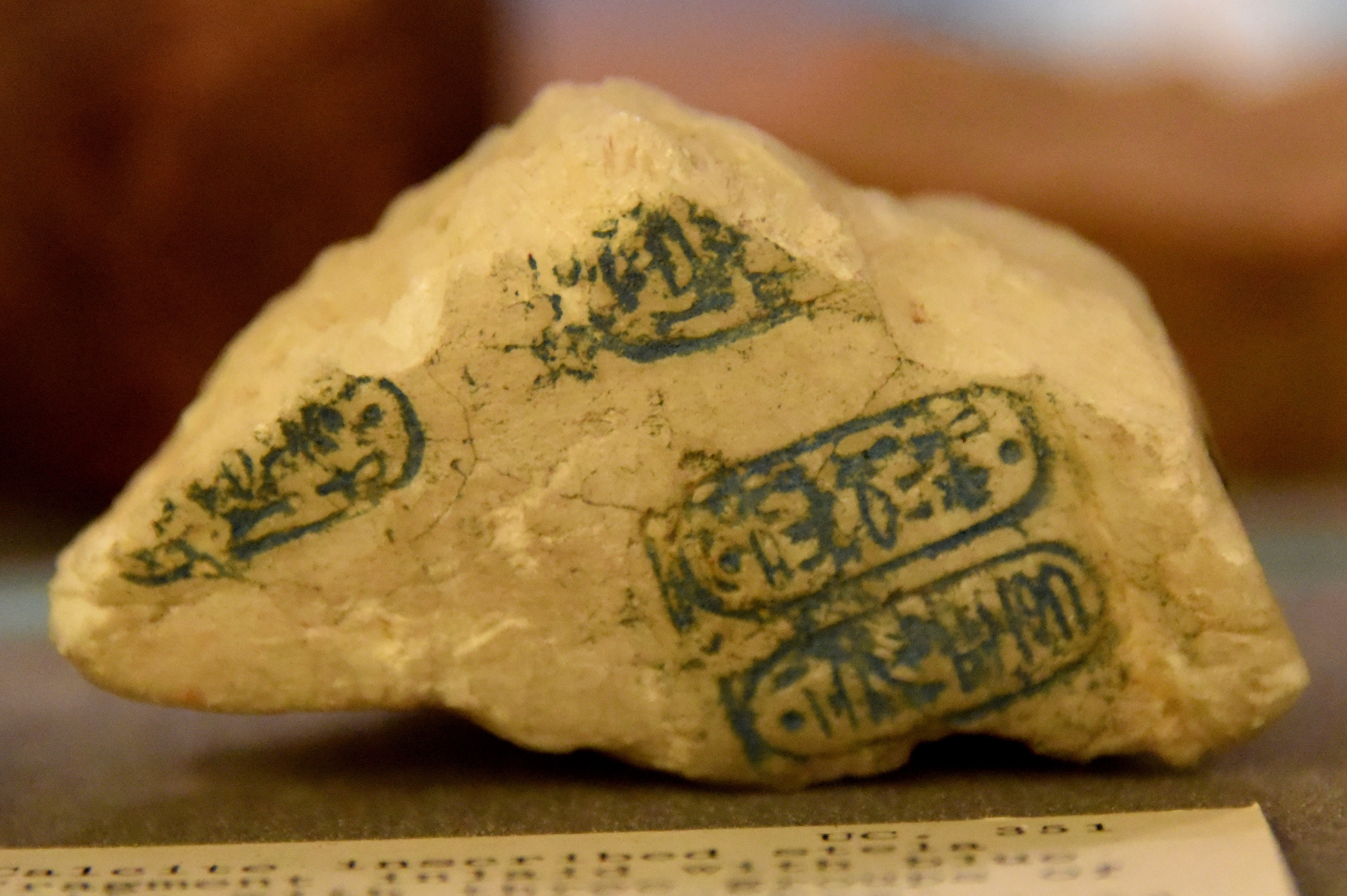
Fragment of a stelae with three late form cartouches for Aten, one depicting a rare intermediate form of the god's name. Amarna, Egypt. New Kingdom, late 18th Dynasty. The Petrie Museum of Egyptian Archaeology, London

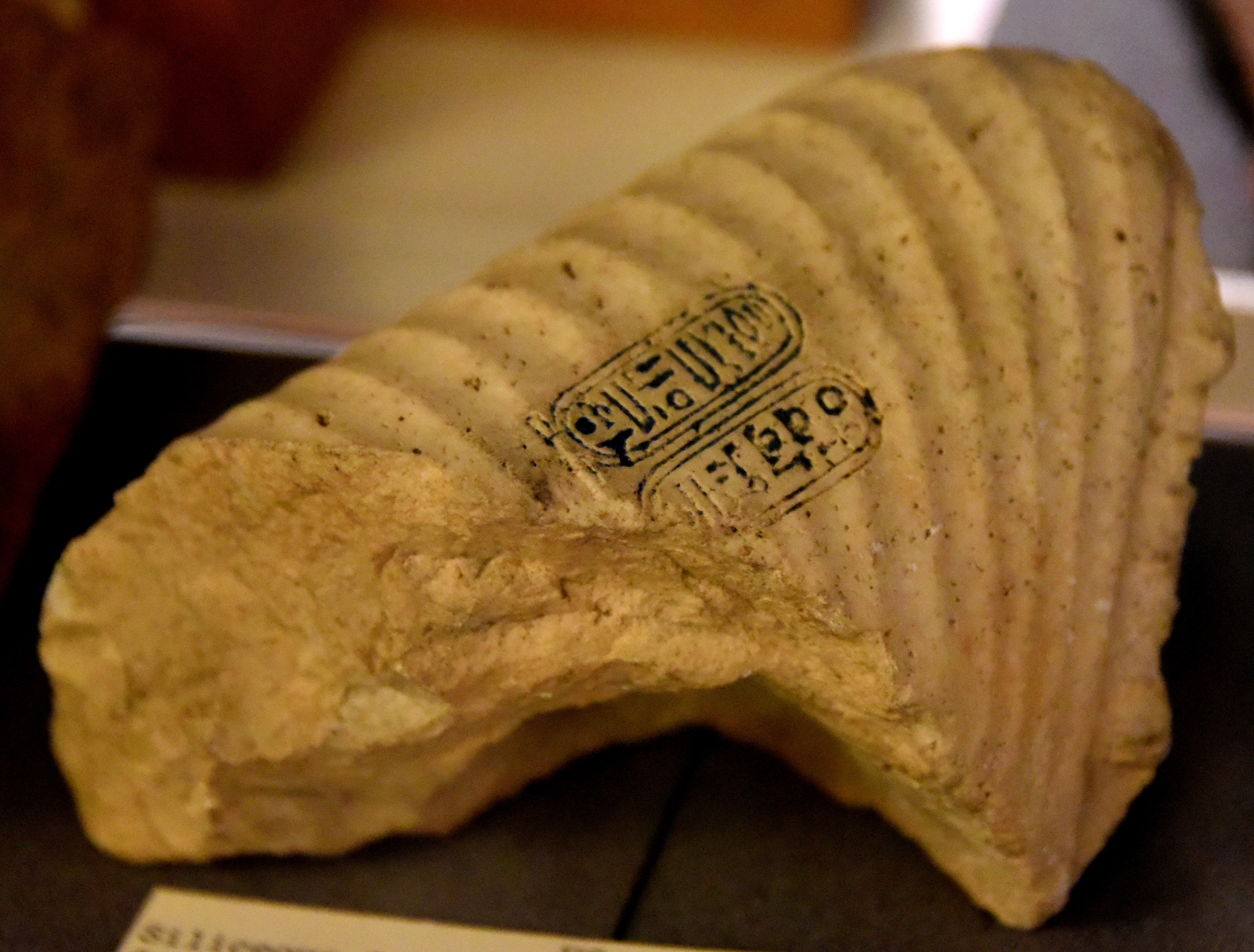
Siliceous limestone fragment of a statue with late form Aten cartouches on the draped right shoulder. Amarna, Egypt. New Kingdom, late 18th Dynasty. The Petrie Museum of Egyptian Archaeology, London

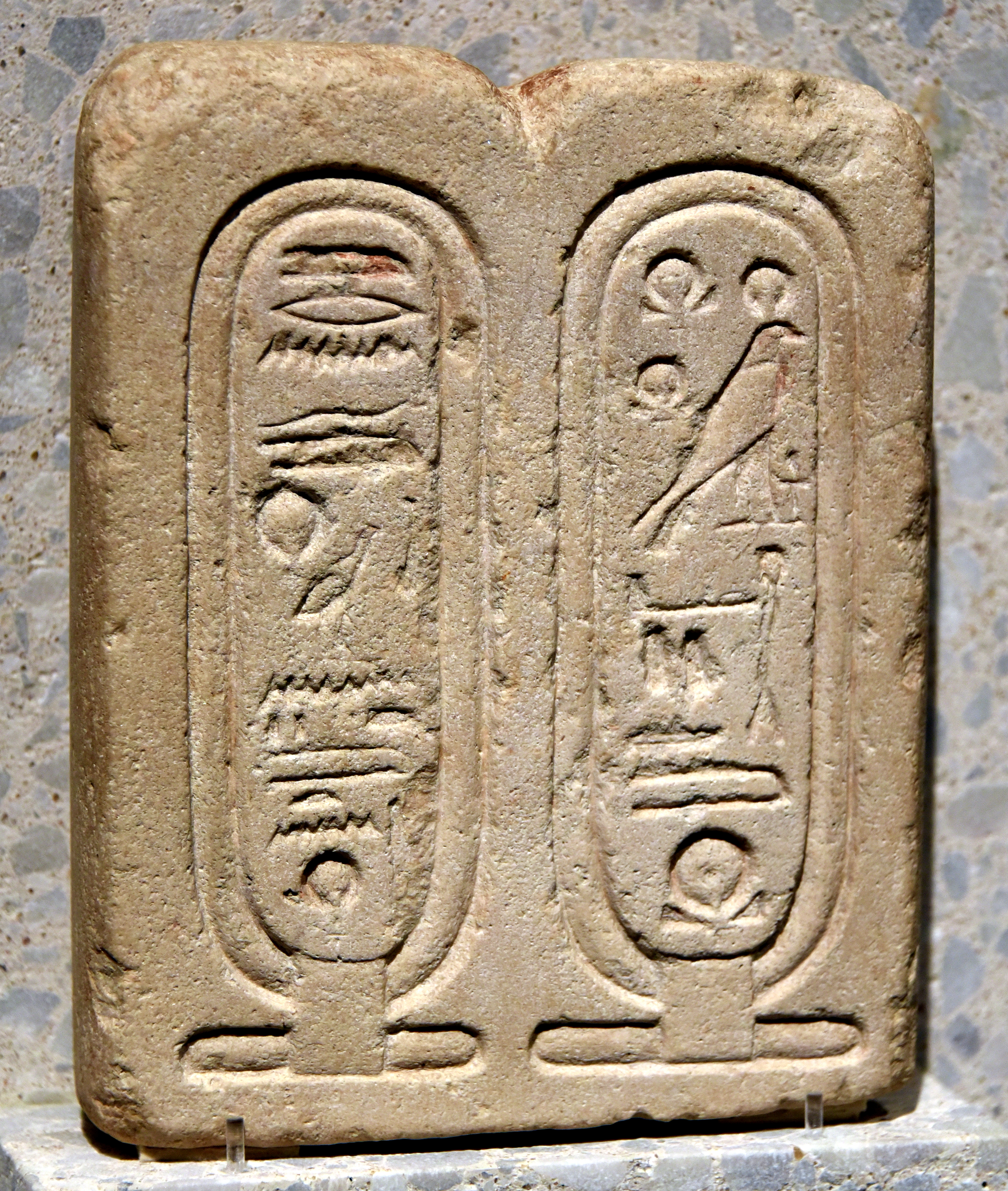
Wall relief with early form cartouches for Aten. Amarna, Egypt. New Kingdom, late 18th Dynasty. Neues Museum, Berlin, Germany.

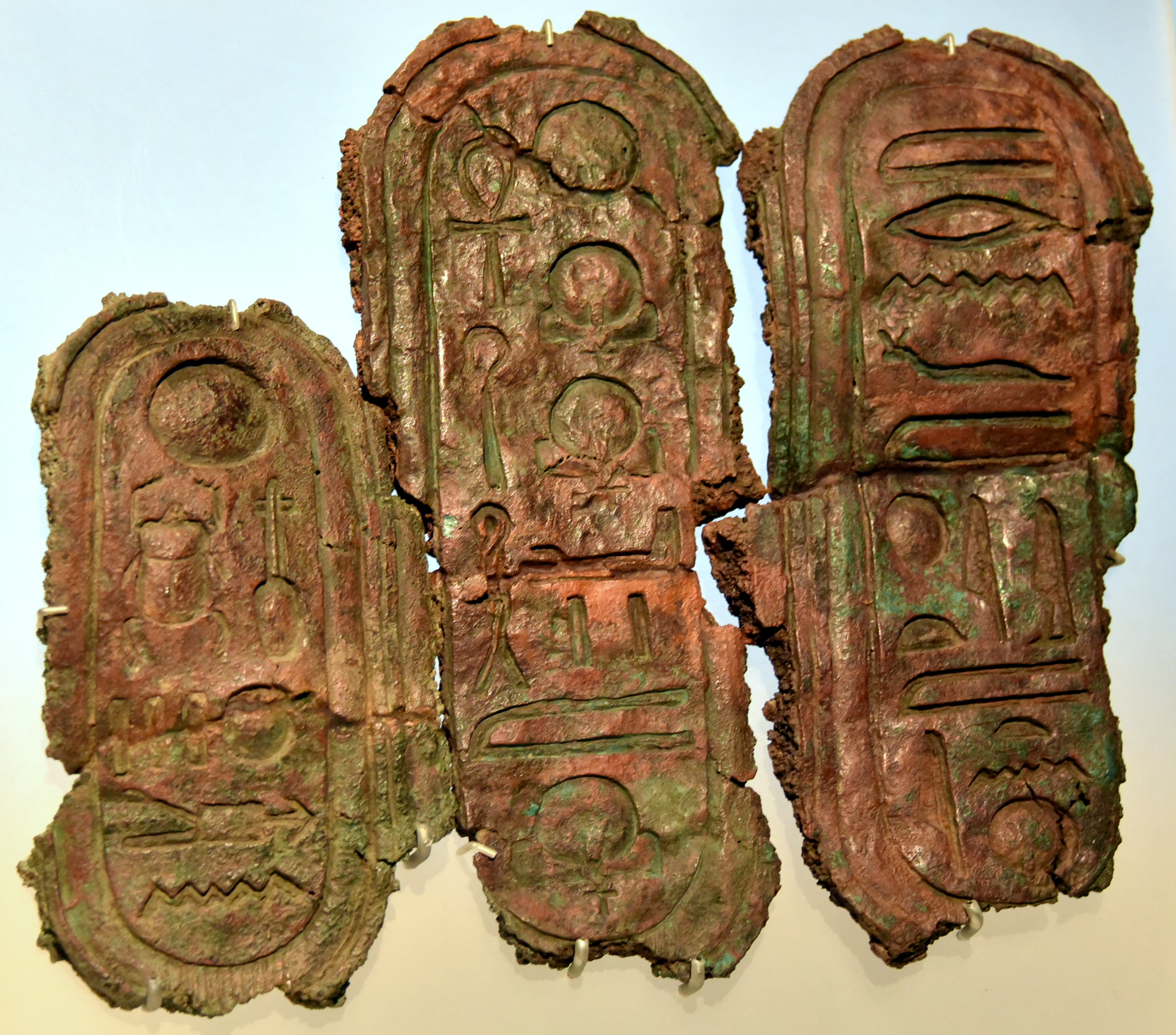
Bronze plate with a cartouche of the throne name of Akhenaten (left) and two late form cartouches for Aten (middle, right). Amarna, Egypt. New Kingdom, late 18th Dynasty. Neues Museum, Berlin, Germany.

== See also ==
- Ancient Egyptian religion
- List of solar deities
- Amun
- Ra
- Akhenaten
- Nefertiti
- Ankhesenamun
- Meritaten
