= List of ancient Egyptian scribes =

Typical depiction of an Egyptian scribe

This is a list of Egyptian scribes, almost exclusively from the ancient Egyptian periods.

The hieroglyph used to signify the scribe, to write, and "writings", etc., is Gardiner sign Y3, Y3 from the category of: 'writings, games, & music'. The hieroglyph contains the scribe's writing palette, a vertical case to hold writing-reeds, and a leather pouch to hold the colored ink blocks, mostly black and red.

== Alphabetic list ==
This list is incomplete; you can help by expanding it.

- Amenemope (author)
- Amenemope (Papyrus Anastasi I)
- Amenhotep, son of Hapu
- Amenmose
- Ani, of the Papyrus of Ani for scribe Ani
- Ankhefenamun
- Butehamun
- Dua-Kheti-("Kheti (scribe)")
- Hesy-Ra
- Hori
- Hunefer
- Imiseba
- Kaaper
- Ken-Amun
- Khakheperresenb
- Menches
- Menna
- Meryre II
- Mose (scribe)
- Nakht
- Nakhtmin
- Nebamun
- Neferhotep
- Pediamenopet
- Penthu
- Ptahhotep Tshefi
- Ramose (TT7)
- Roy (Egyptian Noble)
- Reni-seneb – owner of the Chair of Reniseneb
- Roy (Egyptian Noble)
- Setau
- The Seated Scribe

== List of scribes ==
List of scribes, especially starting with the Old Kingdom of Ancient Egypt.

Scribe	Time period	Notes
Roy (Egyptian Noble)	c. 1300 BC, 18th dynasty	Owner of tomb TT255
Ahmes	Second Intermediate Period; 17th century BC	part of Rhind Mathematical Papyrus
Amenemope	c. 1200 BC, 19th dynasty	Author on papyrus, in hieratic: Instructions of Amenemopet (12 ft long scroll)
Amenemope & Hori	–	Scribes, protagonists of Papyrus Anastasi I
Amenhotep, son of Hapu	under Amenhotep III	later deified
Ani (scribe)	19th dynasty	the Papyrus of Ani, or scribe Ani (a Book of the Dead)
Chancellor Bay	for Siptah	started as "scribe and butler" A life of 'king's servant' and many duties; ordered killed before Siptah dies (in 1 year) a foreigner, and not buried in the tomb he had overseen (1 of 3)
General Djehuty	important general for Thutmosis III	many titles Royal Scribe, etc.
Dua-Kheti	–	possible author of: 1-The Satire of the Trades; 2-Instructions of Amenemhat
Hesy-Ra	scribe for Pharaoh Djoser (3rd dynasty)	Noted for his wood panels (archaic hieroglyphs)
Hori & Amenemope	–	Scribes, protagonists of Papyrus Anastasi I
Hunefer	–	–
Irtyrau	Female scribe (Nitocris I)	TT390
Khakheperresenb	ca. 2000 BC	–
Menches	fl. 119-110 BC	Noted for his presence in the Tebtunis archive
Menna	–	Tomb of Menna, Theban Tomb 69-TT69; Scribe of the Fields of the King
Meryre II	Amarna Period	(Royal Scribe, etc., for Nefertiti); Tomb of Meryra II
Nakht	Reign of Thutmose IV	Tomb at TT52; Scribe and "Astronomer of Amun"
Nakhtmin	The King's Scribe other titles, including Fan-bearer on the Right Side of the King	under Tutankhamun; Created 5 ushabtis as presentation pieces for Tutankhamun's funeral. (the shabti photo is at Nakhtmin; wood ushabti, some gilded gold, 6-columns of hieroglyphs, (Ht: 0.62m, (62 cm)))
Nebamun	–	Tomb of Nebamun
"Nebmerutef"	18th dynasty	2–"Baboon-(Thoth) and Scribe" statues the baboon-(as Thoth), the Symbolic God for the scribe, (see Tutelary deity)
Penthu	Amarna period	–
Ptahhotep Tshefi (grandson of Ptahhotep)	5th Dyn. to 6th Dyn./25th-24th century BC	Suspected author of his grandfather's precepts: The Maxims of Ptahhotep (see Ptahhotep)
Ramose	(reign of Ramesses II)	lived at Deir el-Medina created for himself: TT7, TT212, TT250; Scribe in the Place of Truth
Reni-seneb	Dynasty 18	owner of the Chair of Reniseneb on display at the Metropolitan Museum of Art, (see Caning (furniture)) (See also: a Dynasty XII scribe, Reny-seneb, article Pah Tum.)
Roy	Scribe	TT255
Senu	18th dynasty	Scribe of the Army (Stele and inscribed tomb enclosure); Tuna el-Gebel necropolis
Setau	was "Viceroy of Kush", during reign of Ramesses II	in youth, was: "Chief Scribe of the Vizier"
Thanuny (Tjanuny)	(reign of Thutmosis III)	TT74; Royal Scribe, and Army Commander, (Commander of Soldiers) an extensive chronicle of Thutmosis' military exploits Tjaneni records the Battle of Megiddo (15th century BC) at Karnak, Hall of Annals
The Seated Scribe	4th dynasty	A painted, lifelike seated statue in the Louvre

=== Theban Tomb list of scribes ===
Scribes from the Theban Tombs.

- TT7–Ramose (TT7)-Scribe in the Place of Truth
- TT17–Nebamon-(scribe title)
- TT21–User-(scribe title)
- TT23–Tjay-(or To)-(scribe title)
- TT38–Djeserkaraseneb(Djeser-ka-ra-sen-b)-(scribe+title)
- TT49–Neferhotep-(scribe title)
- TT52–Nakht-Scribe, "Astronomer of Amun"
- TT56–Userhet-(titles)
- TT57–Khaemhat-(titles)
- TT65–Imiseba/Nebamon-(titles)
- TT69–Menna-Scribe of the Fields of the King
- TT74–Tjanuny-(titles)
- TT79–Amenemhat-(scribe title)
- TT80–Tutnefer-(titles)
- TT82–Piay-(scribe title)
- TT102–"Imhotep"-scribe, etc.
- TT107–NefersekherU-(scribe title)
- TT136–Unknown-Royal Scribe
- TT147–Heby/Unknown-(scribe-etc.)
- TT226–Unknown-Royal Scribe
- TT255–Roy (Egyptian Noble)-Royal Scibe
- TT347–Hon-Scribe
- TT350–Unknown-Scribe
- TT351–Apau(ApaU)-Scribe of Cavalry
- TT364–Amenemheb-(scribe title)
- TT365–NefermenU(Nefermenu)-(scribe title)
- TT370–Unknown-Royal Scribe
- TT373–Amenmessu-(scribe title)
- TT374–Amenemopet-Treasury Scribe
- TT387–Meryptah-(scribe title)
- TT390–Irty-RaU(Irtyrau)-Female Scribe-etc.
- TT403–Merymaat-Temple Scribe
- TT406–Piay-(scribe title)
- TT412–Kenamon-Royal Scribe
- (Note: all names ending in "U" show a plural for the last 'hieroglyph "syllable"')

=== Scribes with block statues ===
Scribes honored and revered with a block statue. (The original block statue started with the Tomb of Hetep, Saqqara, 12th Dynasty as two cuboid statues, one each of granite and limestone, and inscriptions explaining the block form, and exposed limbs receiving the first rays of the morning sun-(to arise out of primordial earth). The granite statue represents the daytime sunlit journey, the limestone the night.)

- Khay-(scribe)–New Kingdom-Thoth-(tutelary of Scribes)-honored in Shrine-form-(Naos)(at Louvre)
- Nebnetro-(scribe)–honors Egyptian God figures: extensive hieroglyph story-(+plinth inscription)
- Unknown1-(scribe)–at British Museum

=== Non-scribe, ancient Egyptians portrayed as "seated scribes" ===
- Prince Setka, son of Djedefra, 4th dynasty; (typical sitting form, with "atypical" Flooring enclosure)
- Intef the Elder, 11th dynasty patriarch, father of Mentuhotep I. "Seated scribe", headless, made under the reign of Senusret I. Shown here: Intefaa
- Horemheb, 18th dynasty (1340s to 1320s BC), commander-in-chief of the army under the reigns of Tutankhamun and Ay. "Seated scribe", the 'bust'. Shown here: Horemheb
- Ramesses I (Paramessu), 18th dynasty (1320s to 1290s BC), vizier during the reign of Horemheb. "Seated scribe", statue remainder, the 'bust'. Shown here: Paramessu

== See also ==
- List of Theban Tombs
- Theban Necropolis
