= Nebtawy =

Nebtawy may refer to:

- Mentuhotep IV, ancient Egyptian pharaoh of the 11th Dynasty
- Nebtawy, ancient Egyptian lady buried in TT255

Not to be confused with Nebettawy, an ancient Egyptian queen of the 19th Dynasty
