= Reserve head =

Category of Ancient Egyptian sculpture

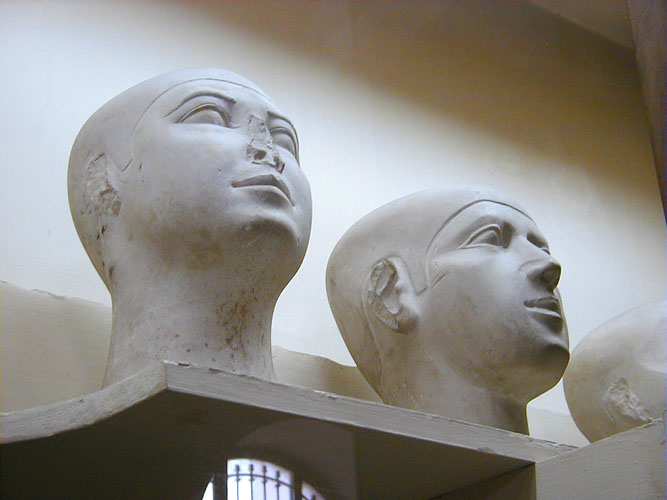
Two reserve heads displayed side-by-side on a shelf at the Egyptian Museum, Cairo

Reserve heads (also known as "Magical heads" or "Replacement heads", the latter term derived from the original German term Ersatzköpfe) are distinctive sculptures made primarily of fine limestone that have been found in a number of non-royal tombs of the Fourth Dynasty of Egypt; primarily from the reigns of pyramid-building pharaohs Khufu to Khafre, circa 2551–2496 BC. While each of the heads share characteristics in common with each other (and some examples may be more caricature than reflecting a true-life appearance), the striking individuality of the pieces makes them some of the earliest examples of portrait sculpture in existence. Their purpose is not entirely clear; the name comes from the prevalent theory first put forward in 1903 by the German Egyptologist Ludwig Borchardt, that the head was to serve as an alternate home for the spirit of the dead owner should anything happen to its body.

== Description ==
What surprised the archeologists was the highly individual nature of these life-sized depictions, whose individual character has been compared to portrait heads of classic and modern times. For private works, ancient Egyptian sculptors tended to capture an idealized version of a face, often eliminating individual traits in a way that, as one writer put it: "approached architectural impersonality". In contrast the reserve heads seem to depict unique individuals, with one early researcher ascribing family relationships between the reserve heads he found. With few exceptions they are of high artistic quality, and were very probably the product of the royal workshops.

The majority of the heads were made of a fine, white limestone, while a couple of examples have been found that were made of ground mud from the banks of the Nile. Although there are a few exceptions that are more crudely carved and heavily plastered, most are intricately carved and have been carefully smoothed. The smooth ones have not, however, been polished. They all depict people with shaved heads or close-cropped hair, and the largest examples are just over 30 cm (12 in) in height.

=== Mutilation of the reserve heads ===
Almost all of the heads show some form of damage or mutilation that may or may not have been deliberately inflicted upon them before they were placed in the tomb. One of the most common features is for their ears to be broken off or seemingly chiseled away At least one scholar disputes that the damage to the ears was deliberate, pointing out cases where detached ears have been found in perfect condition, and that the damage may be due more to rough handling by tomb robbers. Of the many reserve heads only one has wholly intact ears; in others they have been scraped off close to the surface, whereas other or more crudely hacked or broken away. One example contained dowel holes for the attachment of external ears which were not found with the head, and another, smaller group of reserve heads were not made with any ears at all.

Another common feature has been called the "cranial groove", a careful and deliberate cut that typically starts from the top of the cranium and extends to the back of the neck.

== History ==
The first reserve head was discovered in 1894, in Dashur, by the Director General of the French Service of Antiquities in Egypt, Jacques de Morgan. The majority of the heads were discovered by the American Egyptologist George Andrew Reisner, who excavated a number of mastaba tombs to the west of the Great Pyramid of Giza. He identified these mastabas as belonging to royal family members of the pharaoh Khafre, one of which (No. 4140) was identified as that of a princess based on a stela inscription that was found. Two additional examples were discovered by the Austrian Egyptologist Hermann Junker at Giza during 1914. The vast majority of the reserve heads discovered came from the cemeteries at Giza, though three examples have been recovered from Abusir, Saqqara and Dahshur.

Modern forgeries of reserve heads are known to exist. An example at the Oriental Institute in Chicago was bought from a Cairo art dealer in 1929, and is now thought to be a fake, based in part on the fact that it is made of brown quartzite, a material common to none of the other reserve heads found in situ.

== Possible functions ==
The explanation originally put forward by Ludwig Borchardt, and later expanded upon by other early 20th-century Egyptologists including Junker and Reisner, was that the reserve head served as a ritualistic substitute for the real head of the deceased, in case it was damaged. Another suggestion put forward by Egyptologist Nicholas Millet was that they served as sculptors' prototypes for making further statues and reliefs of the deceased. Moulds were then taken from the reserve heads in plaster, and the gouges that appear on many of the heads, the seeming mutilation to the ears and the excess plaster that appears on at least one of the heads can be explained as the type of damage that would be expected by trying to remove tight-fitting plaster casts from a reserve head.

Egyptologist Roland Tefnin suggested that the heads were ritually mutilated to prevent them from harming the living. Tefnin proposed that the reserved heads were created by a master sculptor, and upon the subject's death the reserve head received a ritualized mutilation to ensure that it could not harm the deceased in the afterlife. He lists the damage at the back of the head, the removal of the ears, the depiction of the deceased with no hair or very short cropped hair and in some cases the carving of a line in the neck representing ritual decapitation as examples. There are problems with this theory however, in that while there was a well-known practice of cutting certain hieroglyphic figures (such as those representing various animals) in tombs to render them harmless to the deceased, this practice never extended to images of the tomb owner. The function of images of the deceased throughout the history of funerary arts in Ancient Egypt was to act as an alternate receptacles for their soul, and "killing" them would be contrary to this purpose. This type of mutilation is not seen in statues placed in later tombs.

The most recent theory proposed by Peter Lacovara as to the purpose of the "mutilations" is that they are guidelines used by the sculptor in the creation of the reserve head. He proposes that a closer examination of the evidence points to all of the lines being carved onto the reserve heads as being done prior to their completion rather than afterwards. As proof he points out that in the most complete examples, the mutilations are minor or absent, and on others it is clear that what grooves were made were subsequently smoothed down, rather than being the fresh cut that would be expected if they were inflicted after their creation. There are other Ancient Egyptian unfinished sculptures where guidelines for the sculptor can be seen, usually painted onto the hard stone. Lacovara believes that paint would have easily rubbed off of the relatively soft limestone that was used, and so the sculptors carved the guidelines instead. These guidelines were then polished away, and in the cases where they were not removed completely were covered by plaster which has since fallen away. Plaster would also have been used to cover up any mistakes that the sculptor had made, such as with the example of heavy plaster seen on one of the reserve heads in Cairo (60003) where the eye has been recarved. The damage seen to the ears of many of the reserve heads is thought to be due mainly to rough handling by tomb robbers. All of this would support the original theory that the reserve heads were designed as alternate places for the soul of the deceased to inhabit.

== Place within Ancient Egyptian art ==
While reserve heads were only made for a relative short amount of time, they made an impression on later sculpture of the Old Kingdom.

Unlike other sculptures from Ancient Egypt, these heads were never intended as part of a larger, composite sculpture; they were stand-alone pieces of just the head done in the round, with a flat surface at the base of the neck suggesting that they were intended to stand upright. Most were found in the burial pits outside of the burial chamber of the tomb, but in those cases it is considered likely that they were simply dumped in these places by tomb robbers. Both examples discovered by Hermann Junker in 1914 were found within the tomb chamber, and are thought to have belonged to the owner of the tomb. No evidence of these sculptures have come from the above-ground offering temples, separating them from other Old Kingdom statues directly associated with the funerary cult of the deceased.

The single instance of a reserve head found in an undisturbed tomb was located beside the sarcophagus of the tomb's occupant. It is generally assumed that all reserve heads were originally in similar positions in their respective tombs, though the large number of heads found in burial pits has led to the suggestion that they were instead originally displayed by the entrance of the tomb chamber rather than within the tomb.

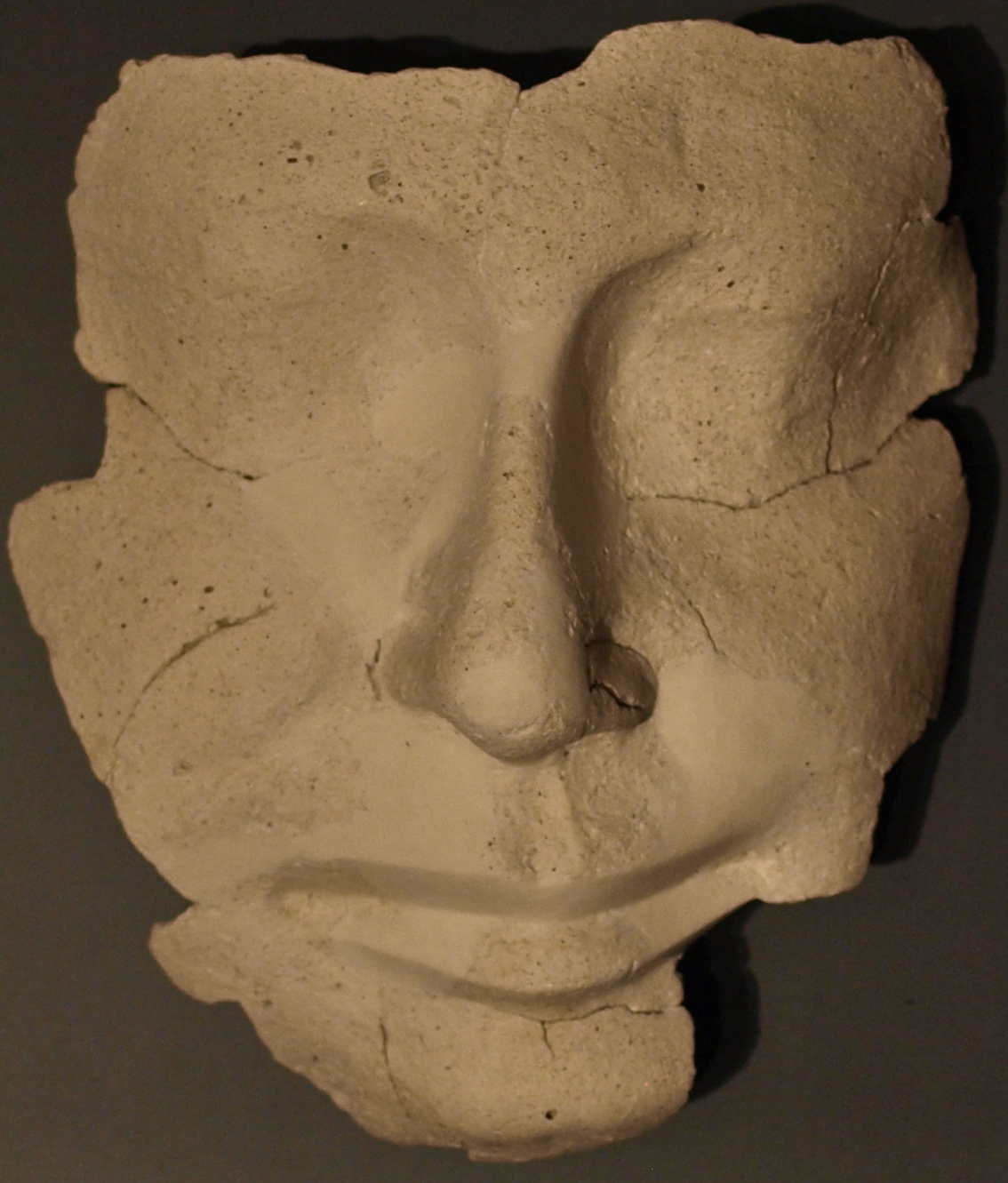
Modeled plaster cast of a face, 5th–6th Dynasty, on display at the Kunsthistorisches Museum, Vienna

The timespan in which reserve heads were created was short; they were likely created by only a couple of generations of sculptors during the reigns of the pharaohs Khufu, Djedefre and Khafre. The practice of using reserve heads appears to have ended sometime during the Sixth Dynasty, replaced by the practice of covering the head or the entire body of the deceased in plaster. These face and body coverings that were created may have the same purpose as the reserve head, working as a substitute location for the spirit if the original head decayed or was otherwise destroyed. It seems likely that both the practice of crafting reserve heads and that of covering the body or face of an individual with plaster overlapped considerably, with an early example of the latter dated to the end of the Fourth dynasty based on the pottery that was found with it. The practice of covering the body or face with plaster was also short-lived, as improved mummification techniques offered a better chance of preserving the body than covering it with plaster. Plaster masks that were formed directly around the head of the deceased are now thought to represent an early stage in a process that would lead to the full mummification of non-royal bodies, eventually evolving into the practice of creating masks made of cartonnage, consisting of linen layers mixed with gesso.

== Location ==
Thirty-seven reserve heads are known, which includes five in private collections. In Abusir, a reserve head for a princess was found by Borchardt, and an ear possibly belonging to Kaaper was found in his tomb. Most of the reserve heads come from Giza. The reserve heads from Giza date from the mid 4th Dynasty to early 5th Dynasty.

Mastaba	Image	Name of tomb owner	Time Period	Present location	Comments
Giza; G 1203		Kanefer; Overseer of Commissions, Director of Bowmen	4th Dynasty (Khufu)	Phoebe A. Hearst Museum of Anthropology, Berkeley 6-19767	Head was found in burial shaft G 1203A. The head is thought to be female and may represent Kanefer's wife.
Giza; G 2110		Nefer; Secretary of the king in all places, etc.	4th Dynasty (Khafre)	Museum of Fine Arts, Boston MFA 06.1886	Head was found in burial shaft G 2110A, the burial shaft of Nefer.
Giza; G 2230 (D 38)	Image at Giza Archive; Image at Giza Archive - profile		4th or 5th Dynasty?	Egyptian Museum, Cairo JE 47838	Reserve head possibly from D 38.
Giza; G 2230 (D 38)	Image at Giza Archive		4th or 5th Dynasty?		Fragment, possibly originally from the serdab of G 2240
Giza; G 4140		Princess Meritites; King's daughter of his body	Mid to late 4th Dynasty	Man: Boston Museum MFA 14.717; Wife: Egyptian Museum, Cairo JE 46217	The reserve heads were found in the debris of burial shaft G 4140A
Giza; G 4160			4th Dynasty (Khufu)	Roemer- und Pelizaeus-Museum, Hildesheim PM 2158	Male reserve-head, damaged, from débris west of tomb.
Giza; G 4240		Prince Sneferuseneb; King's son of his body, etc.	Mid 4th to early 5th Dynasty	Cairo Museum JE 46215.	Head of Sneferuseneb found in burial shaf G 4240A
Giza; G 4340			Mid to late 4th Dynasty	Cairo Museum JE 46218.	A Male reserve-head was found in the débris at bottom of shaft A
Giza; G 4350			Mid to late 4th Dynasty	Kunsthistorisches Museum ÄS 7787, Vienna.	Reserve-head found at entrance of burial chamber
Giza; G 4430			4th Dynasty, Khafre or later		A damaged reserve-head made of clay found in shaft A.
Giza; G 4440	Frontal view wife Profile wife		Mid 4th to early 5th Dynasty	Man: Boston Museum MFA 14.718; Wife: Boston Museum MFA 14.719	The man may be a brother of Snefrusonb (tomb G 4240). Both heads were found in Shaft A. More recent opinion suggests that the head previously identified as the wife is a male
Giza; G 4540	Frontal view Profile view		Mid to late 4th Dynasty	Boston Museum MFA 21.328	A Female reserve-head was found in shaft A
Giza; G 4560	Image at Giza Archives		Mid to late 4th Dynasty	Cairo Museum JE 44974	A female reserve-head was found in the burial chamber.
Giza; G 4640			Mid to late 4th Dynasty	Cairo Museum JE 46216	Male reserve-head found in shaft A.
Giza; G 4650		Princess Iabtet; King's daughter of his body	Mid to late 4th Dynasty	Roemer- und Pelizaeus-Museum, Hildesheim PM 2384	Iabtet was a King's daughter of his body. Reserve-head was found at the entrance of the burial chamber.
Giza; G 4660			Mid to late 4th Dynasty	Cairo Museum Temp. No. 19.11.24.5	Reserve-head, badly weathered, found by Reisner east of tomb G 4560, possibly from G 4660.
Giza; G 4940 (L45)	Frontal view Profile	Seshemnefer I overseer of royal works, director of the palace, etc.	Early 5th Dynasty	Boston Museum (MFA 21.329)	Limestone reserved head from shaft G 4940B
Giza; G 5020 Annex				Egyptian Museum, Cairo JE 67569	Limestone head found in the annex of G 5020. May originally come from G 4240.
Giza; G 7560	Image at Giza Archive		Early 5th Dynasty	Boston Museum (MFA 37.643) later MMA 48.156	Limestone head found in shaft B.
Giza; Street G 7500	Image at Giza Archive			Boston Museum MFA 27.2010	Limestone head found in street east of G 7530-7540
Giza; S 984	Image at Giza Archive	Tjentet and Wehemnefret	5th Dynasty	Egyptian Museum, Cairo	Clay reserve head. Wehemnefret may be a daughter of Wenshet (owner of G 4840). Wehemnefret has the title king's daughter (may refer to king's granddaughter here)
Giza; East Field			4th-5th Dynasty	San Antonio Museum of Art	
Giza; East cemetery	Image at Giza Archive			Egyptian Museum, Cairo JE 37832	Limestone reserve head from unidentified mastaba
Unknown			4th Dynasty	Reserve head of a man on display at the Petrie Museum, London. (UC15988)	Its authenticity is disputed.
Unknown			4th-5th Dynasty	Ackland Art Museum 70.17.1	A limestone reserve head.
Memphis?	Image from Swansea Website		5th-6th Dynasty	Swansea University of Wales (W164)	Purchased by Sir Henry Wellcome at a Sotheby's auction in 1928. According to the Egypt Centre's website the reserve head comes from Memphis and dates to the 4th Dynasty.
Abusir or Saqqara?			5th-6th Dynasty	In private possession in Belgium as of 1991	Thought to represent a woman and possibly from Abusir or Saqqara.
Abusir		Kahotep	Old Kingdom	Ägyptisches Museum, Berlin (Berlin 16455)	Reserve-head of Kahotep found at Abusir - Old Kingdom
Abusir		Kaaper	5th Dynasty		An ear belonging to the reserve head was discovered in the burial chamber.

Examples of reserve heads can be found at the following museums:

- Ackland Art Museum, Chapel Hill, North Carolina
- Ägyptisches Museum, Berlin
- Egyptian Museum, Cairo
- Kunsthistorisches Museum, Vienna
- Museum of Fine Arts, Boston
- Petrie Museum of Egyptian Archaeology, London
- Phoebe A. Hearst Museum of Anthropology, Berkeley
- Metropolitan Museum of Art, New York City
- Roemer- und Pelizaeus-Museum, Hildesheim
- San Antonio Museum of Art, Texas
- Swansea University
