= Shendyt =

Wrapped garment worn in ancient Egypt

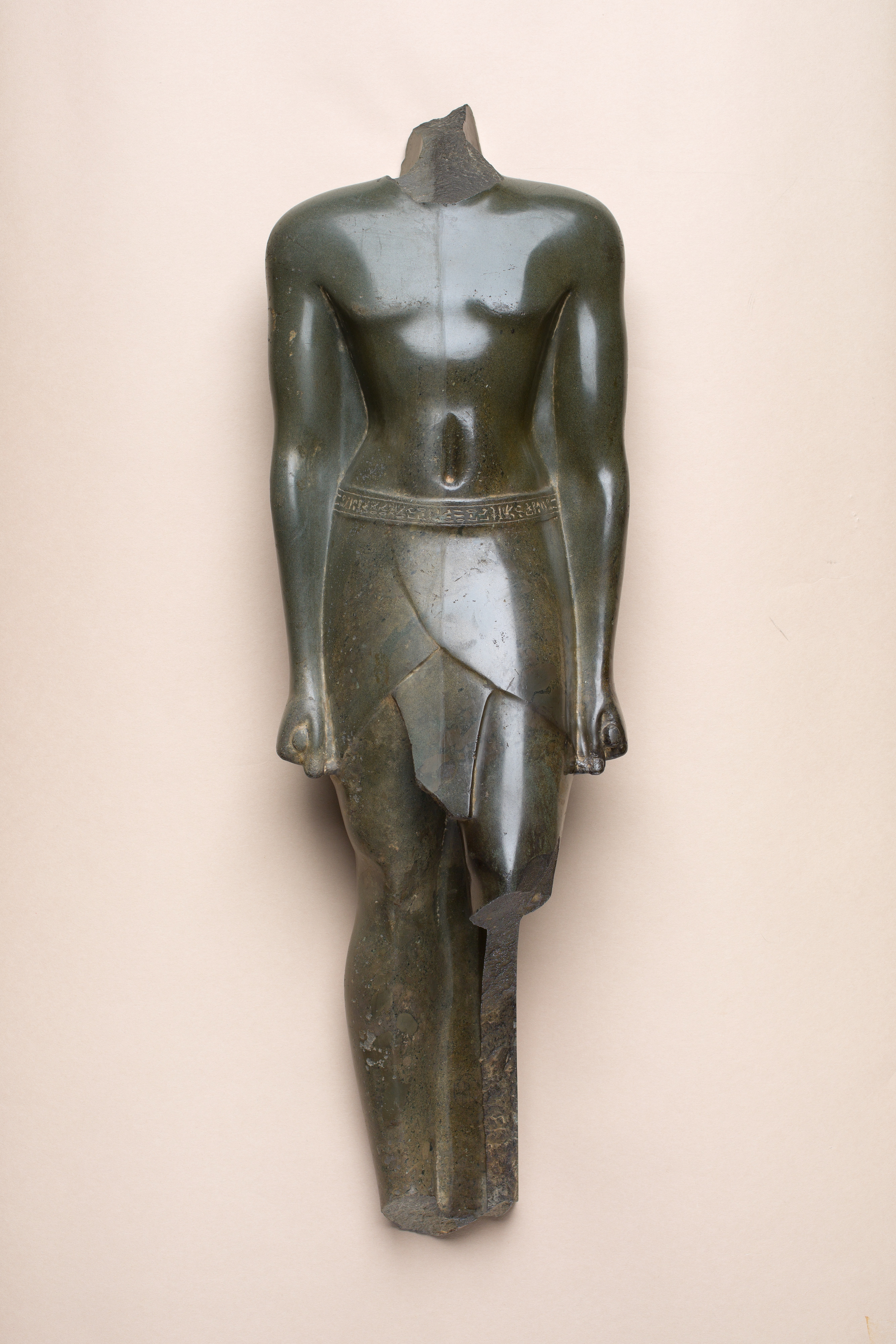
- Statue of Tjahapimu wearing a shendyt, Metropolitan Museum of Art
- Type: skirt worn around the waist, typically extending above knees
- Material: linen

N37 N35 I10 X1 S26
Shendyt (šnḏ.t)
in hieroglyphs

The shendyt (šnḏyt, Schenti, Schent, Shent, Skent) was a type of loincloth similar to a skirt. It was a kilt-like garment worn in ancient Egypt. It was made of cloth and was worn around the waist, typically extending to above the knees. Shendyts are depicted on pharaohs, deities, and commoners in a variety of situations in Egyptian artwork.

The shendyt may have been an adaptation of early hunting skirts which allowed freedom of movement for the wearer. Members of the military wore a version of the shendyt, as they too would need freedom of movement in battle. Shendyts worn by those of higher rank or class would have been made of finer materials.

== Gallery ==
The following files are the variations of Schenti worn in ancient Egyptian society.

modern drawing of a pharaoh wearing a standard Shendyt

modern drawing of a pharaoh wearing a more ornate Shendyt

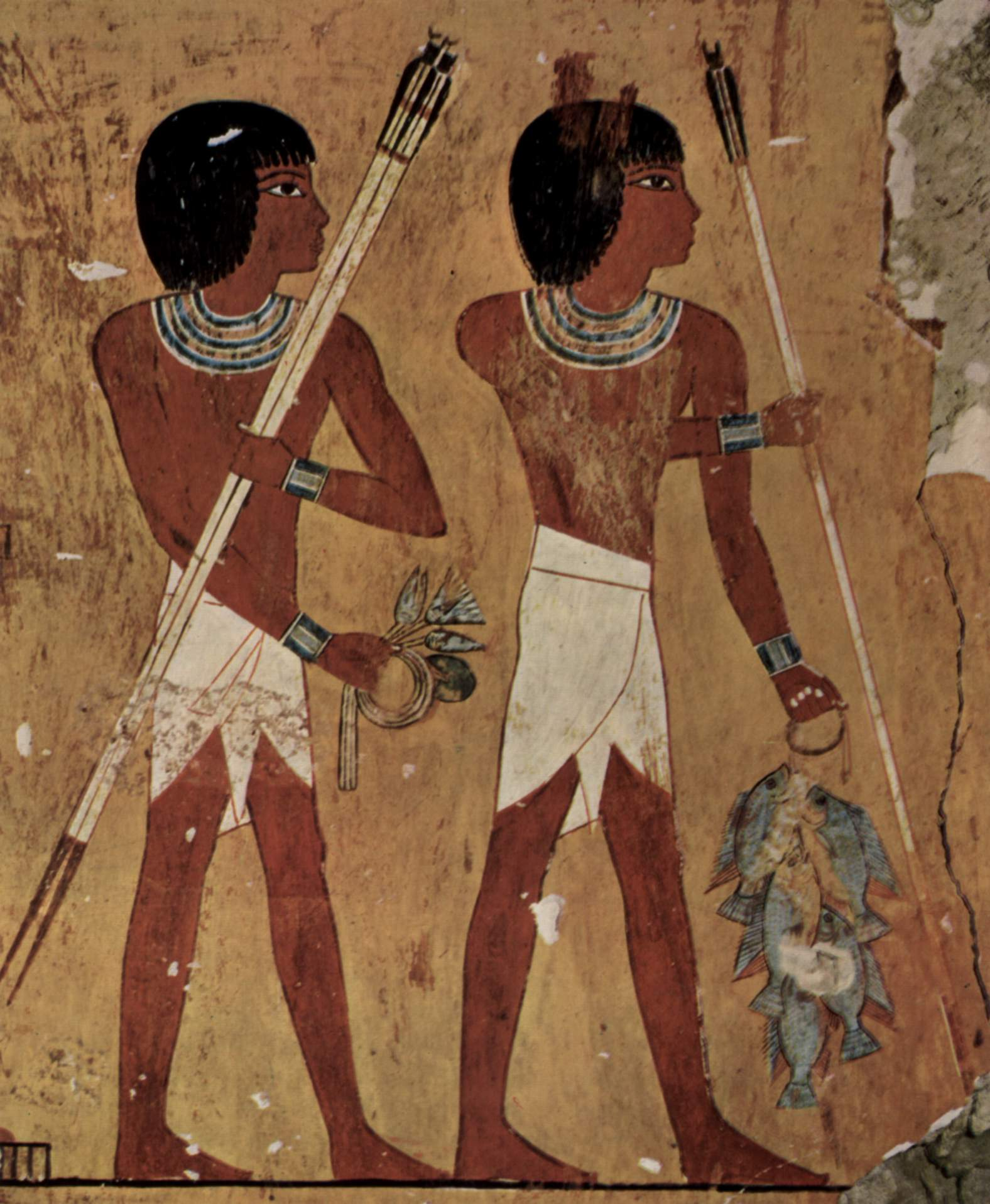
tomb of Ken-Amun

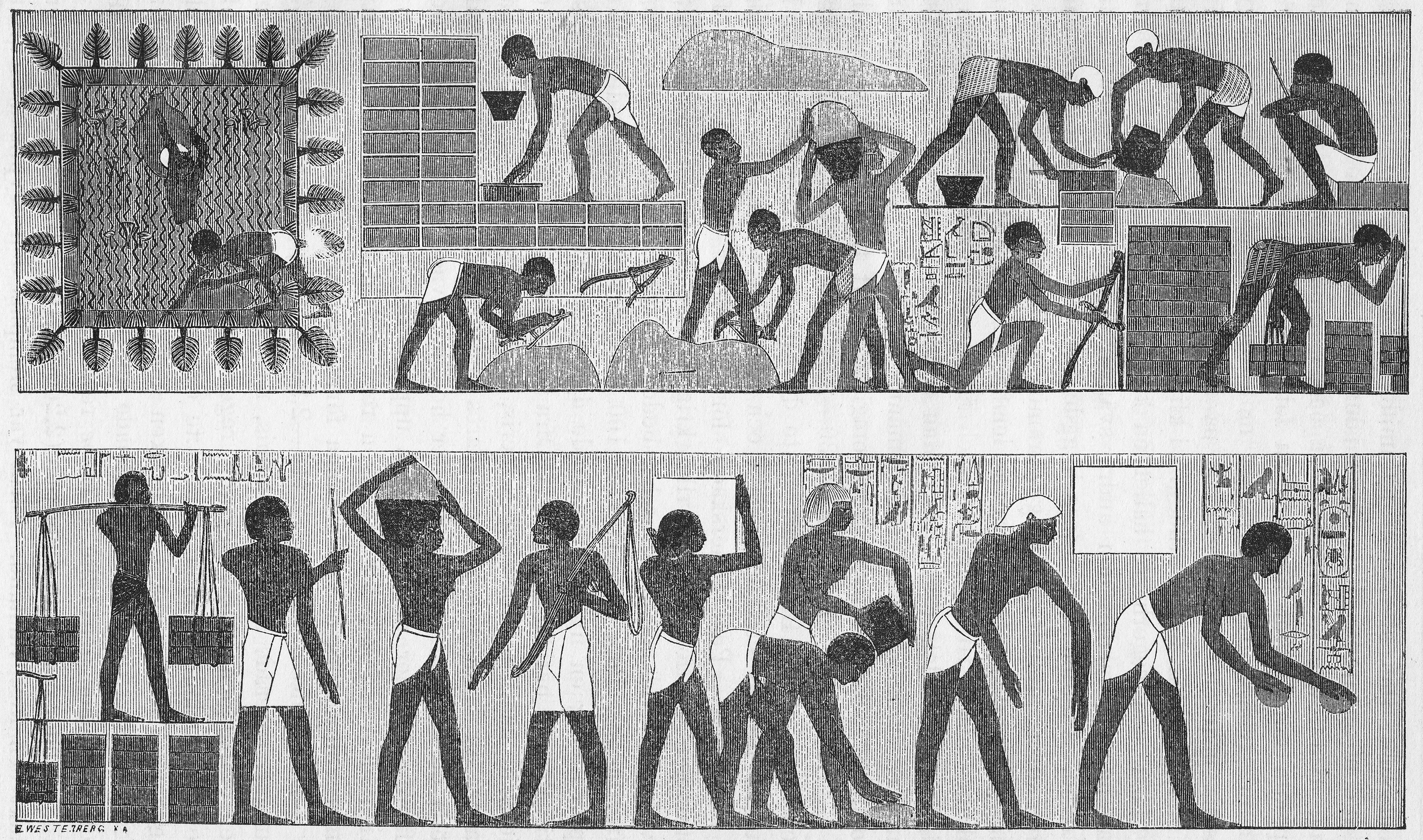
a grave at Thebes

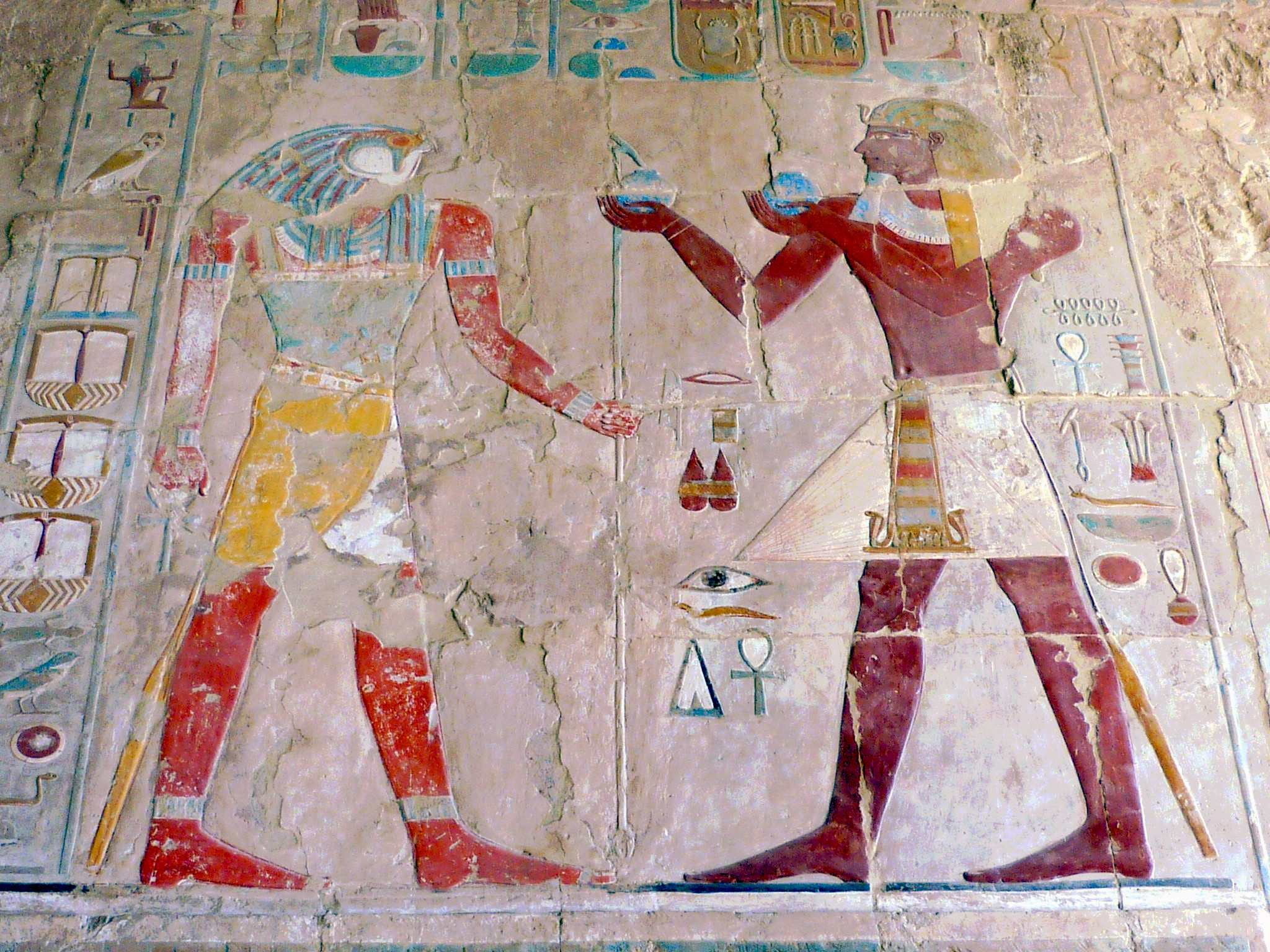
Mortuary temple of Hatshepsut

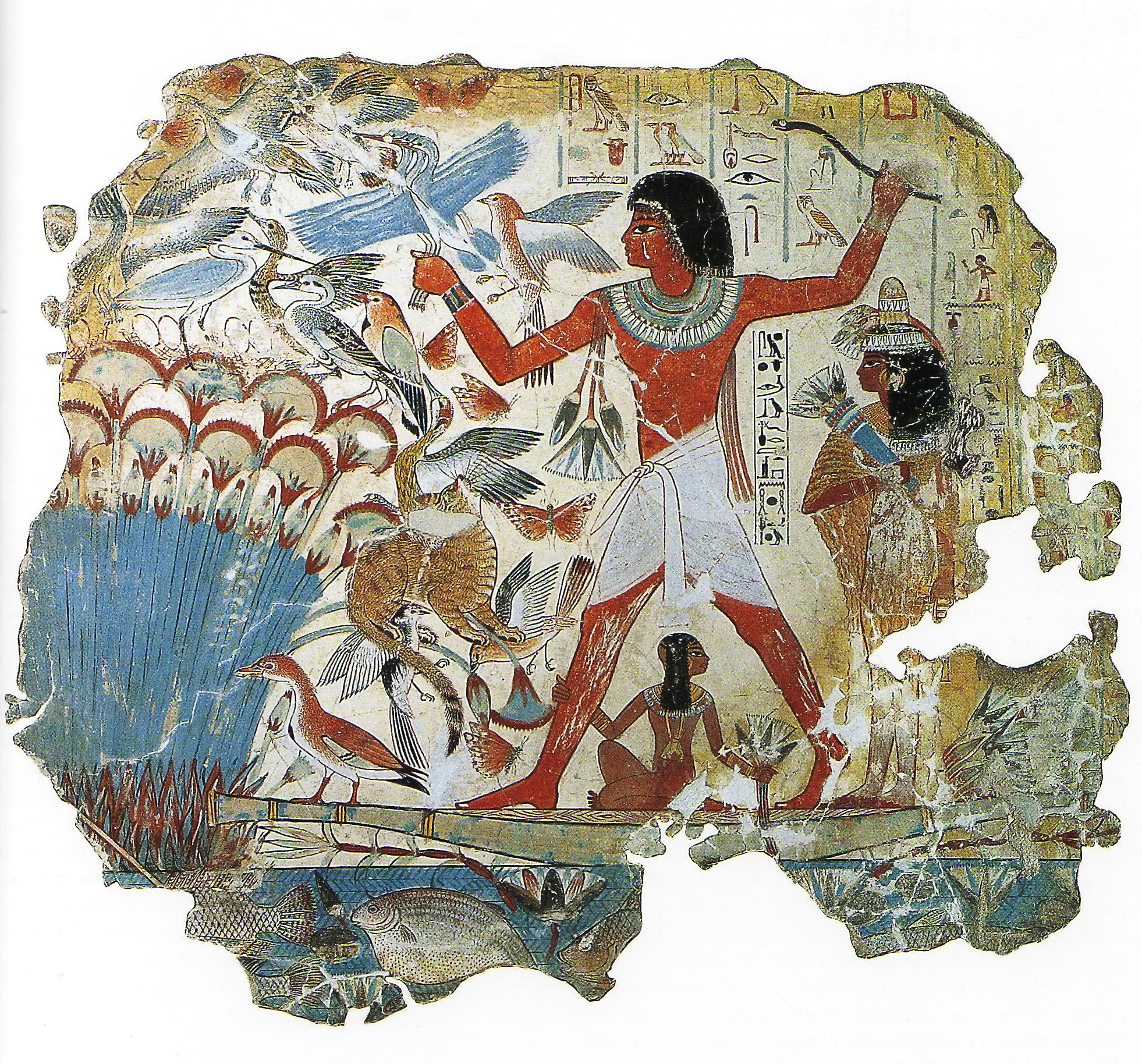
Tomb of Nebamun

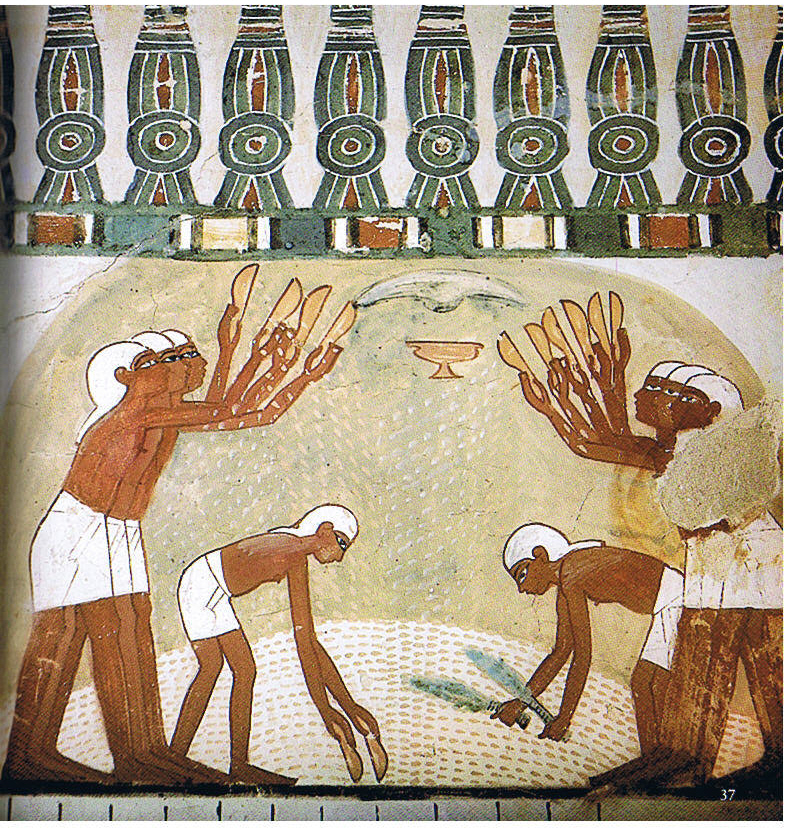
TT52

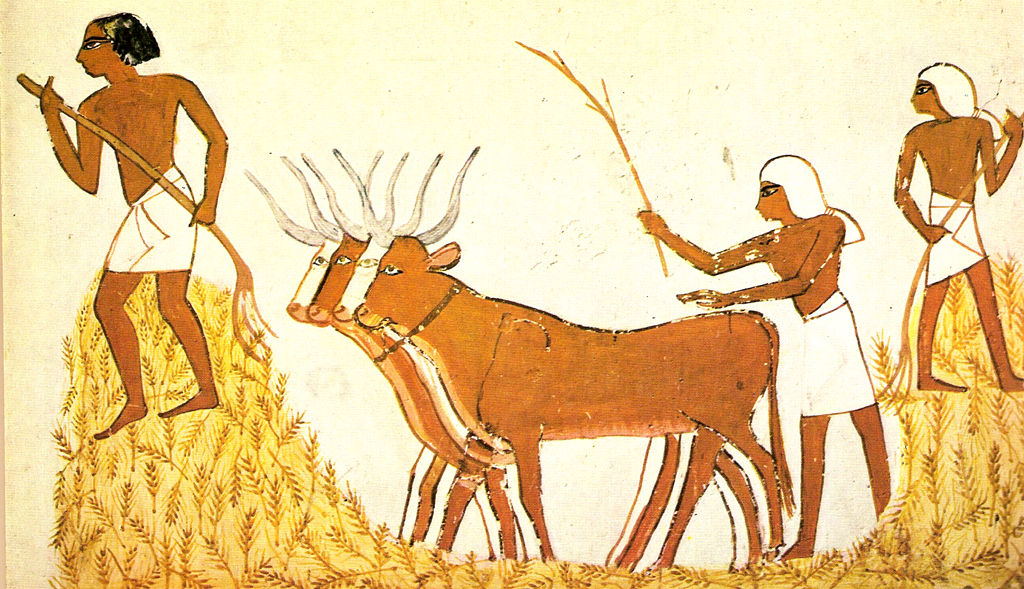
