= Penthu =

Ancient Egyptian royal physician

- Chief of Physicians
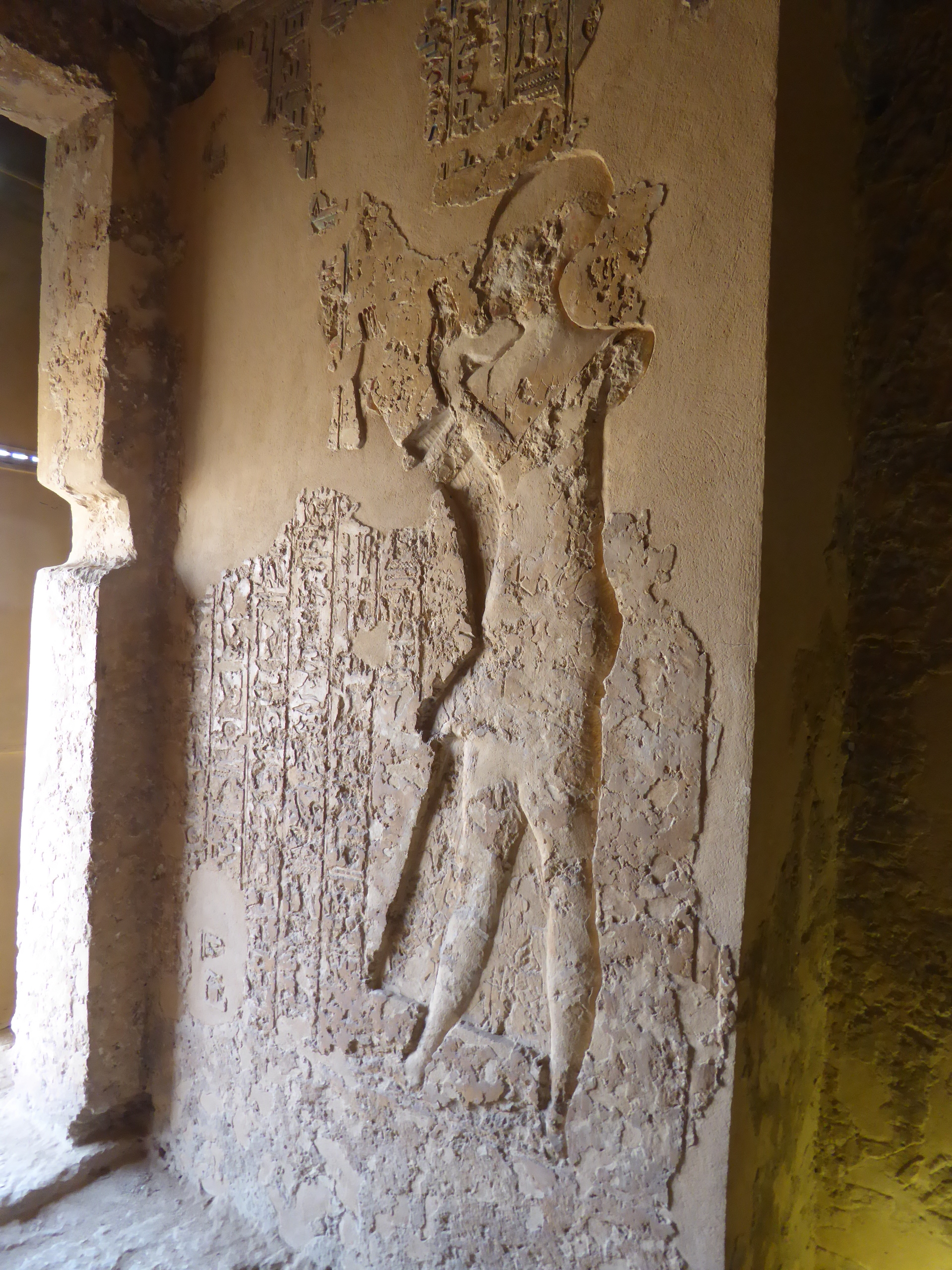
- A depiction of Penthu in his Amarna Tomb
Egyptian name
p n T w A51
- Dynasty: 18th Dynasty
- Pharaoh: Akhenaten
- Burial: Amarna Tomb 5

Penthu (Ancient Egyptian: pnṯw) was an Egyptian noble who bore the titles of sealbearer of the King of Lower Egypt, the sole companion, the attendant of the Lord of the Two Lands, the favorite of the good god, king's scribe, the king's subordinate, First servant of the Aten in the mansion of the Aten in Akhetaten, Chief of physicians, and chamberlain. These titles alone show how powerful he would have been in Eighteenth Dynasty Egypt.

He was originally the Chief Physician to Akhenaten, but may have survived the upheavals of the end of the Amarna Period, and served under Ay, after being Vizier under Tutankhamun. The identification of Penthu the Physician with Pentu the Vizier is not certain, however. He had a tomb constructed at Amarna, Amarna Tomb 5, although his remains have never been identified, and he was probably never buried there.

An inscription discovered in 2004 in the Deir Abu Hinnis limestone quarry records that quarrying was being undertaken for building work on the Small Aten Temple under the authority of the king's scribe Penthu. The inscription is explicitly dated to Year 16, 3rd month of Akhet, day 15 of the reign of Akhenaten. The Penthu mentioned in the inscription is presumably the same Penthu who was the owner of Amarna Tomb 5. Due his position as a chief priest within the Aten priesthood, it is unlikely to be a coincidence that he would have been placed in charge of quarrying stone for this temple. The inscription was first published in 2012 by Athena van der Perre and established that Nefertiti was still alive in the second last year of Akhenaten's reign--his Year 16--and makes it probable she ruled Egypt as the female king Neferneferuaten--just prior to Tutankhamun's reign.

== See also ==
- List of ancient Egyptian scribes

== Gallery ==
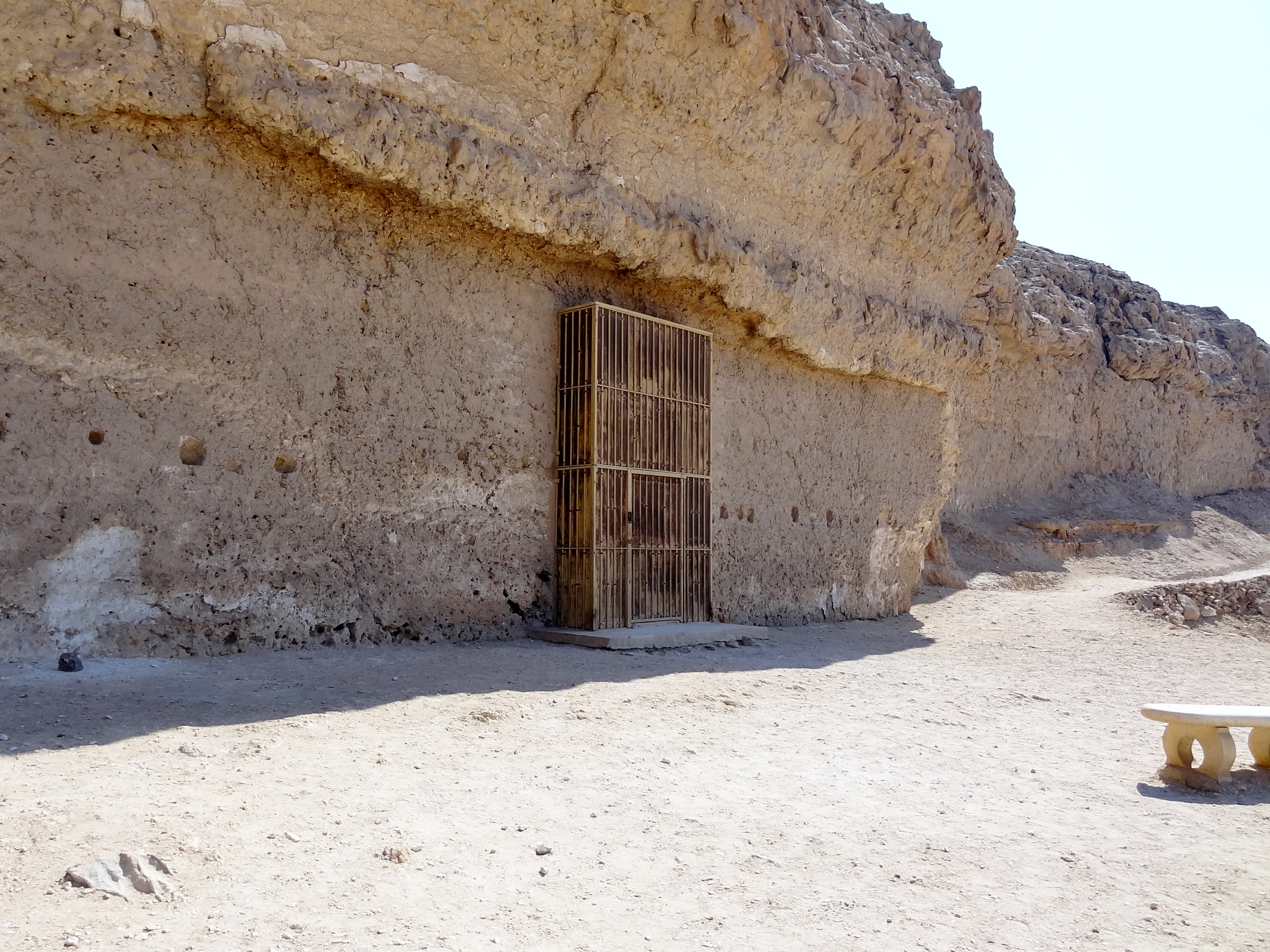
The exterior entrance to Penthu's tomb

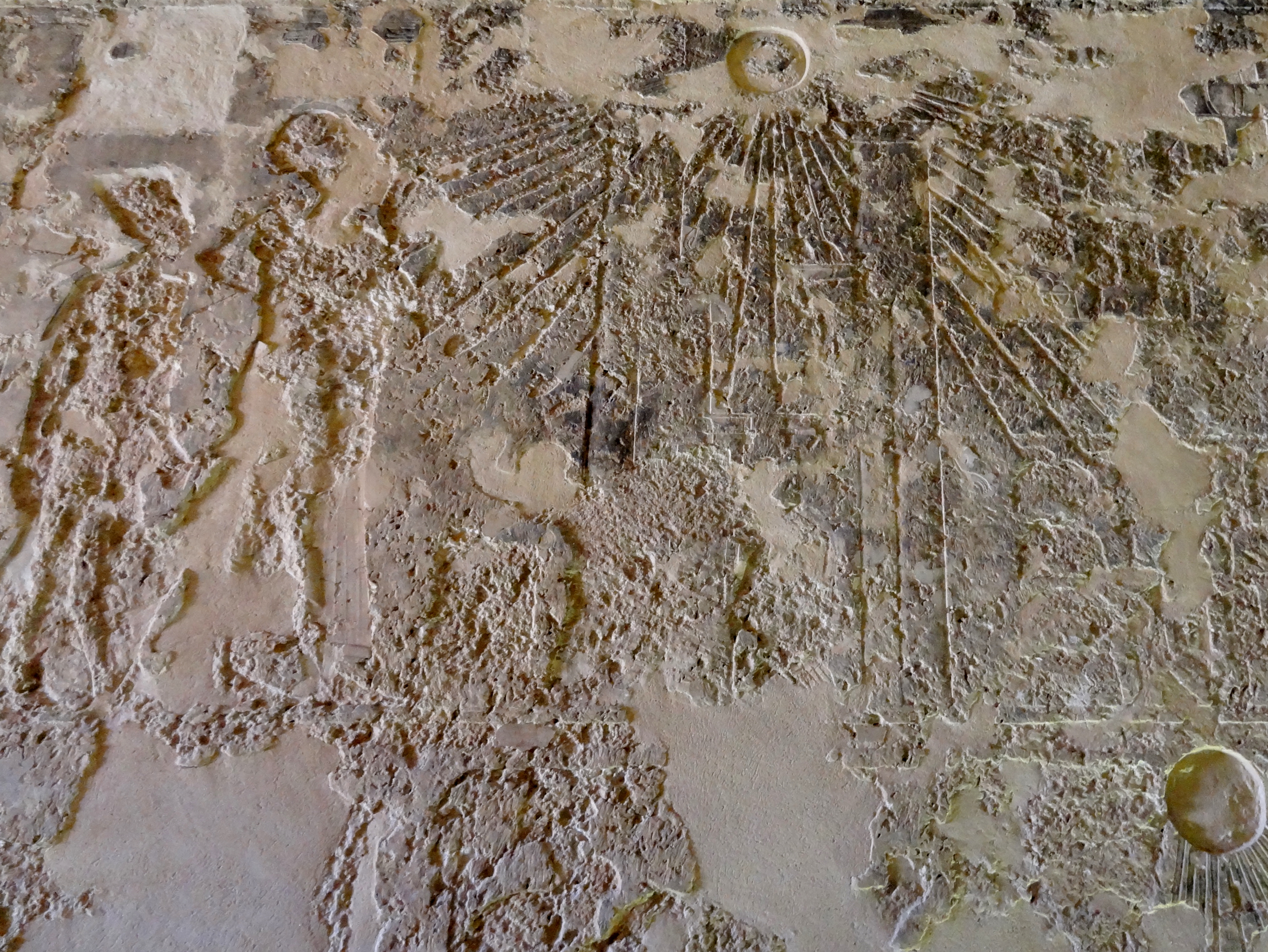
Erased figures of Akhenaten and Nefertiti from Penthu's tomb

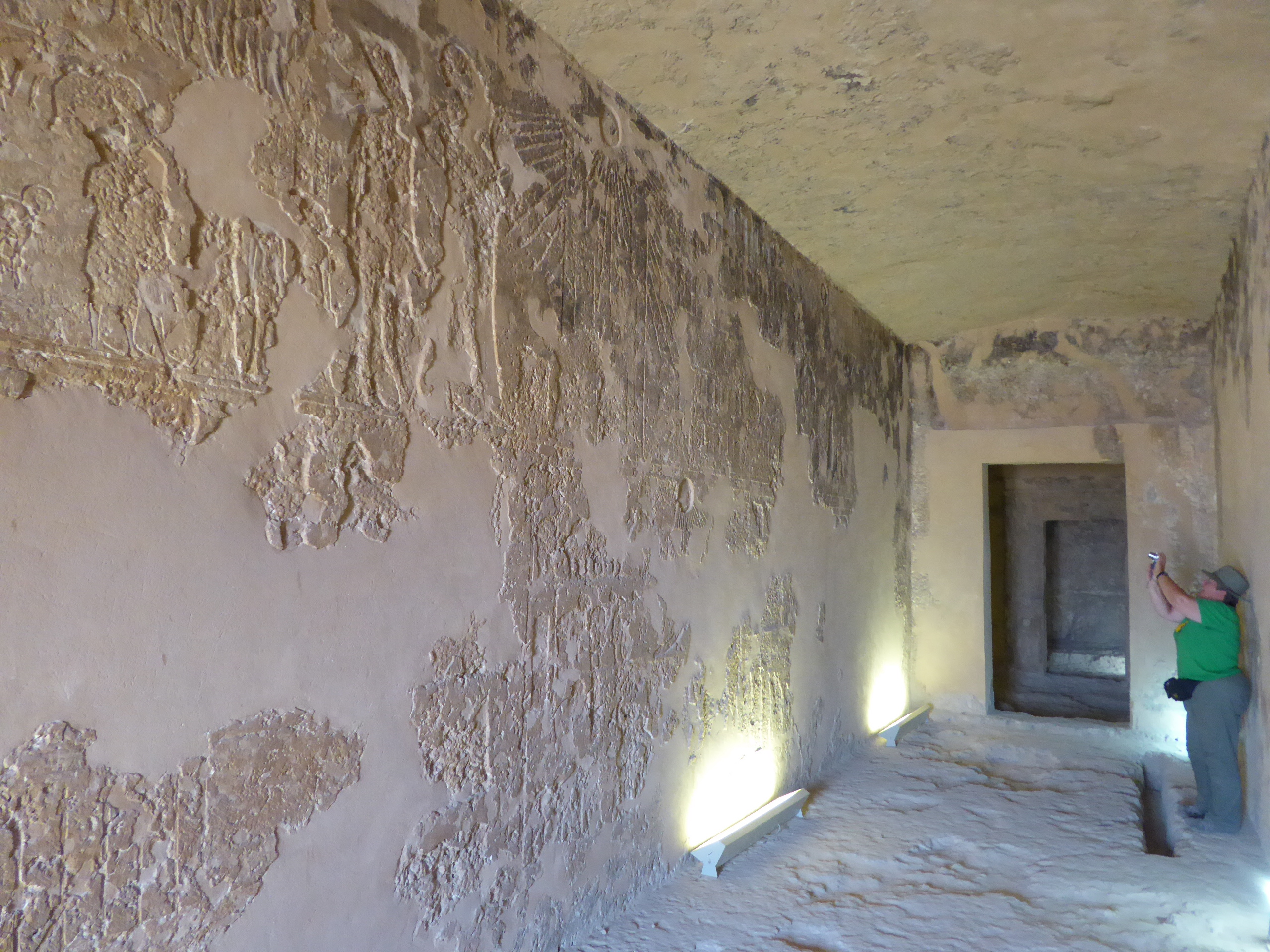
An interior view of Penthu's Amarna tomb 5
