= Amarna Tomb 5 =

Ancient Egyptian tomb

Coordinates: 27.6617°N 30.9056°E

- Burial site of Penthu
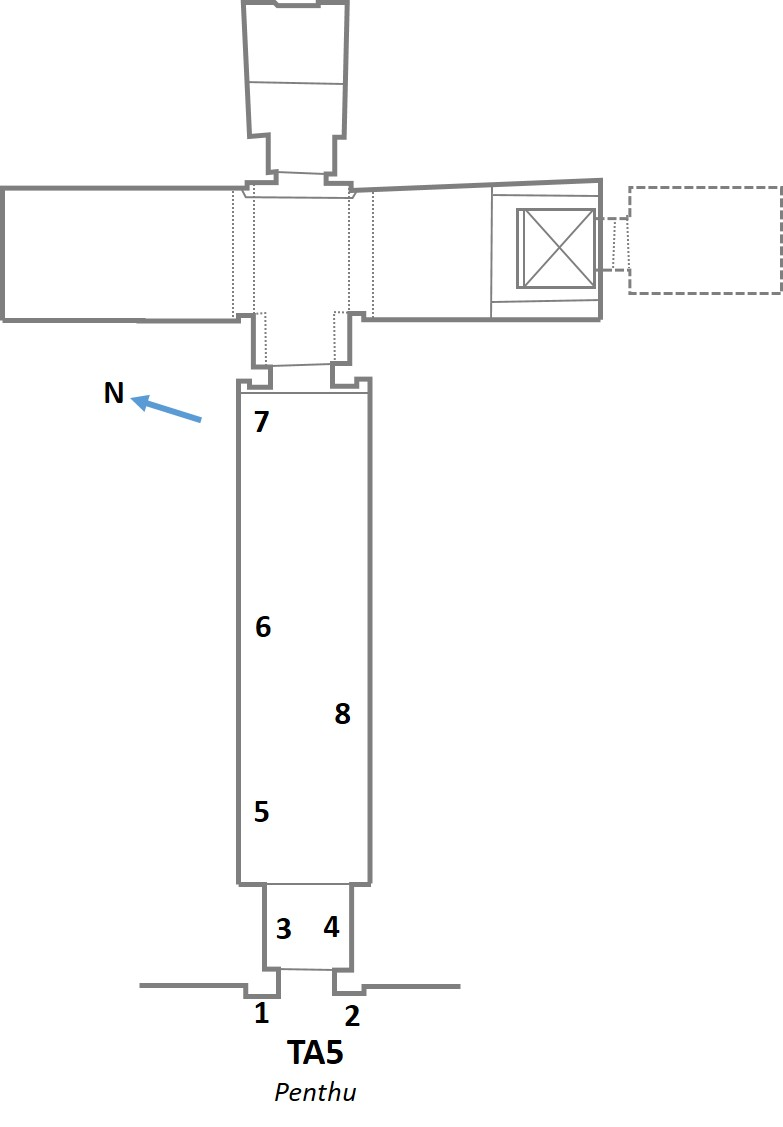
- Plan of the tomb

- Location: Northern tombs of the nobles, Amarna
- ← Previous; Amarna Tomb 4 Next → Amarna Tomb 6

Amarna Tomb 5 is an ancient sepulchre in Amarna, Upper Egypt. It was built for the courtier Penthu, and is one of the six Northern tombs at Amarna. The burial is located to the south of the tomb of Meryra. It is very similar to the tomb of Ahmes. The sepulchre is T-shaped and its inner chamber would have served as the burial chamber. The tomb features a deep 12 metre or 39 feet shaft obstacle in its inner hallway to deter tomb robbers from reaching the burial chamber.

== Penthu ==
p n T w A51
Penthu
in hieroglyphs
Era: New Kingdom
(1550–1069 BC)

Penthu served at court during the 18th Dynasty reign of the Pharaoh Akhenaten. Penthu held the titles of sealbearer of the King of Lower Egypt, the sole companion, the attendant of the Lord of the Two Lands, the favorite of the good god, king's scribe, the king's subordinate, First servant of the Aten in the mansion of the Aten in Akhetaten, Chief of physicians, chamberlain.

== Decoration ==
The tomb is decorated and scenes include a visit from the royal family to the temple and a reward scene.

=== North wall ===
On the north wall the royal family is shown entering the temple. Akhenaten and Nefertiti are accompanied by three of their daughters: Meritaten, Meketaten and most likely Ankhesenpaaten.

On the same wall the royal family is depicted rewarding Penthu at the temple. Akhenaten is shown wearing the read crown and Nefertiti stands behind him (the upper half of her body is damaged). Behind the royal couple we see three princesses accompanied by their nurses.

=== South wall ===
On the south wall Penthu is depicted in another award scene but this one takes place at the palace. In an associated scene the king and queen are shown having a meal. Akhenaten is shown wearing a khat headdress. He is seated and is eating fowl. Nefertiti is seated behind him, wearing her blue crown and seems to be drinking from a cup.

== Gallery ==
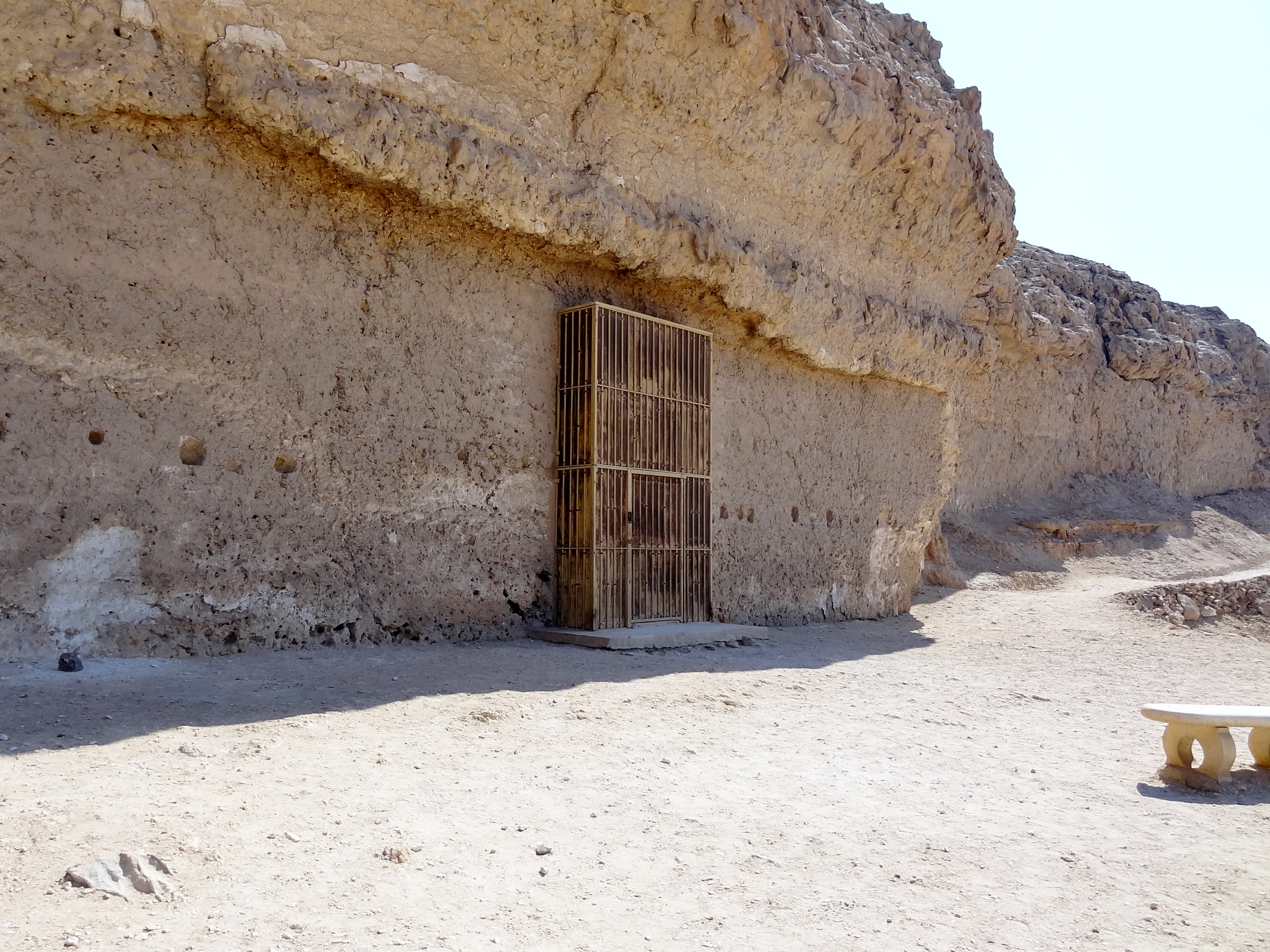
The exterior entrance to Penthu's tomb

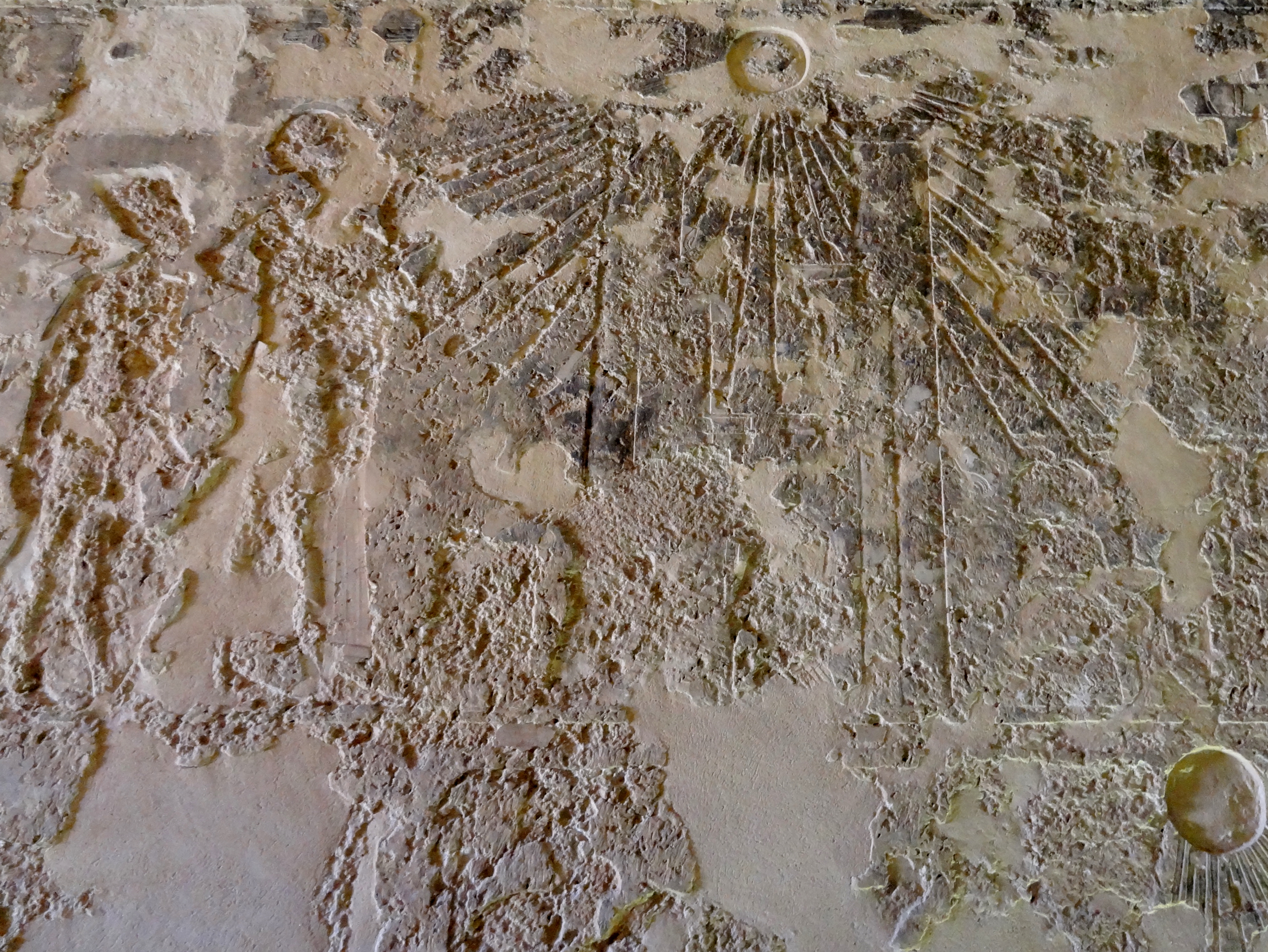
Erased figures of Akhenaten and Nefertiti from Penthu's tomb

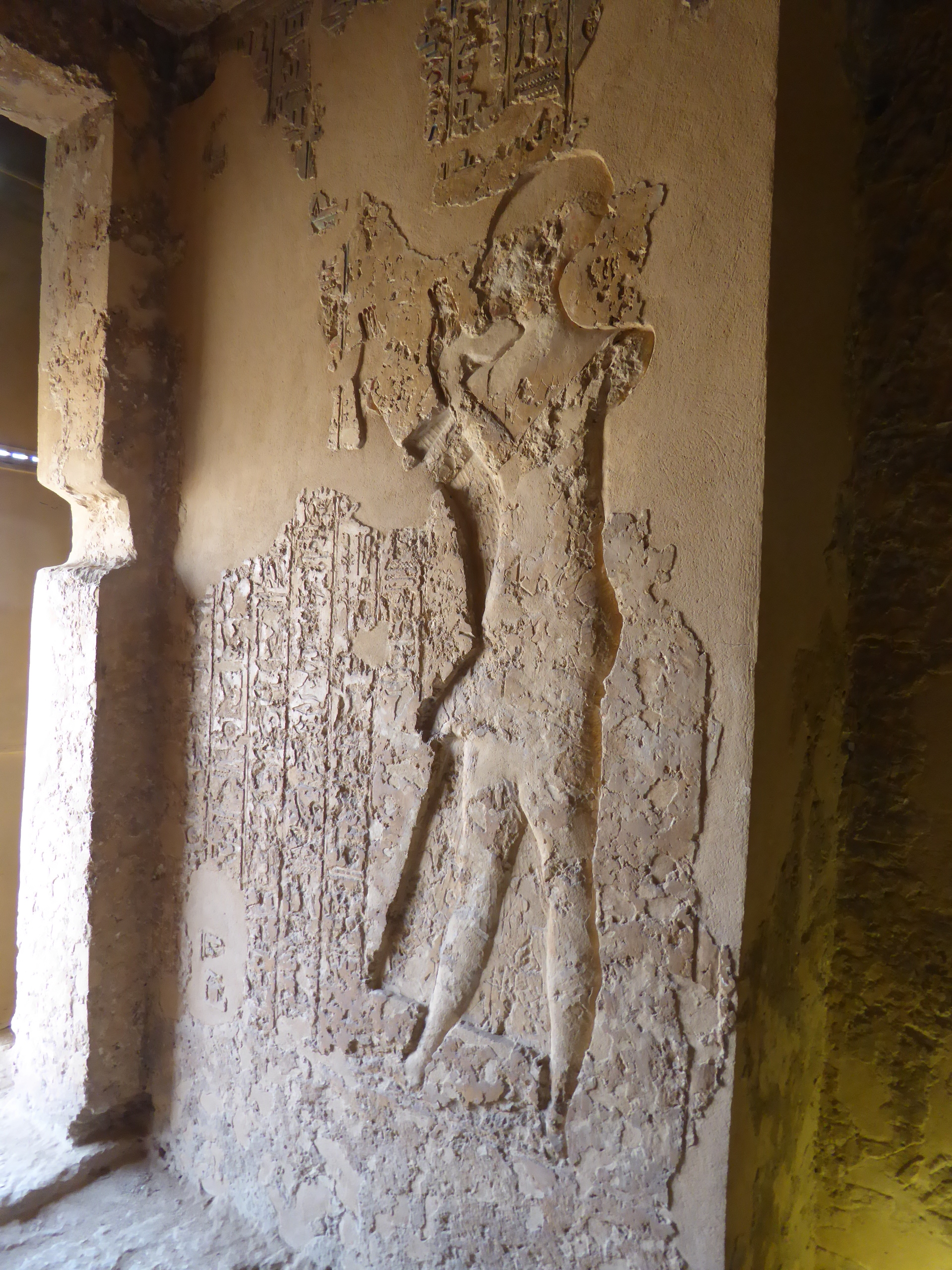
A depiction of Penthu in his Amarna Tomb 5

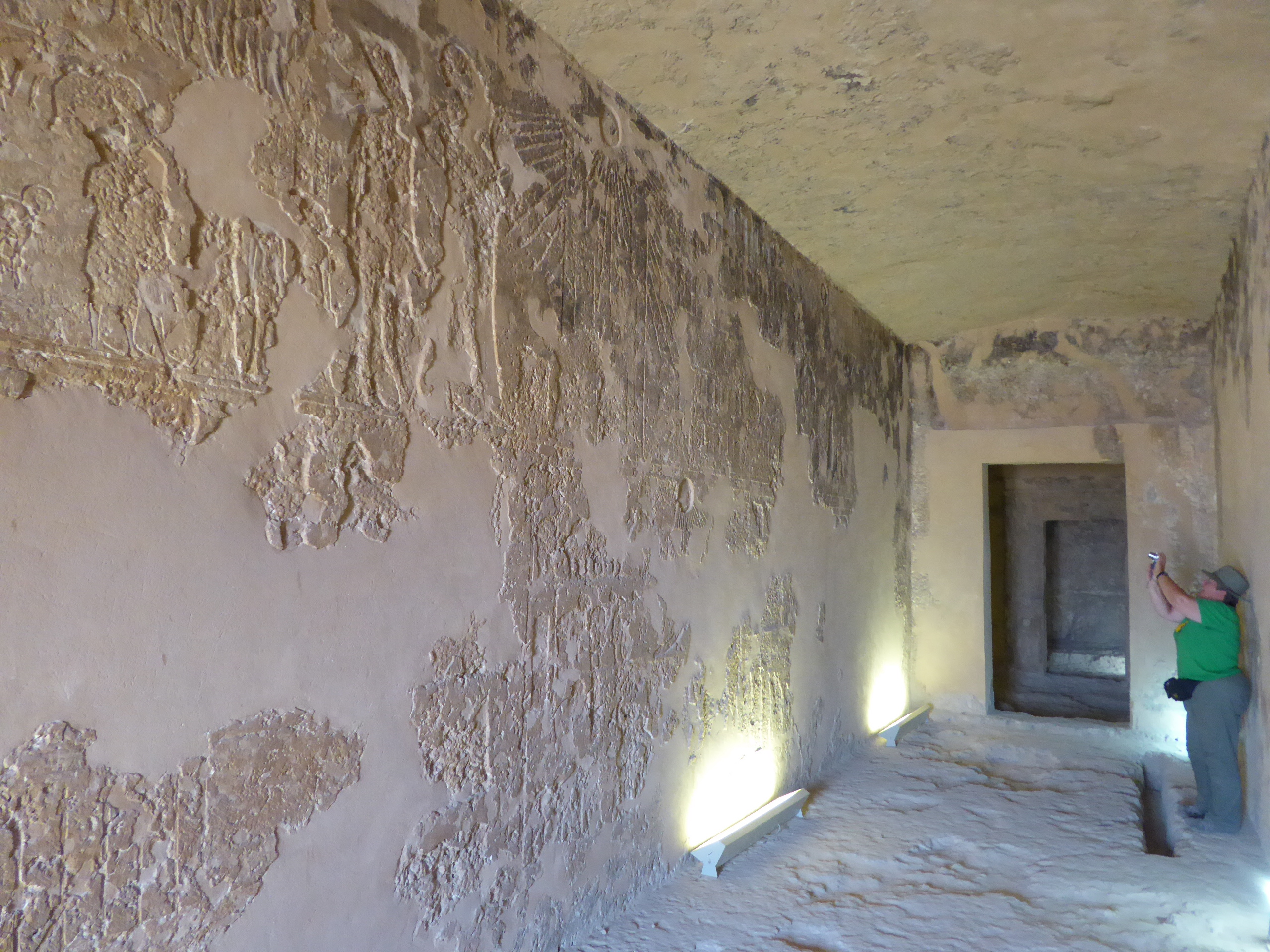
An interior view of Penthu's Amarna tomb 5

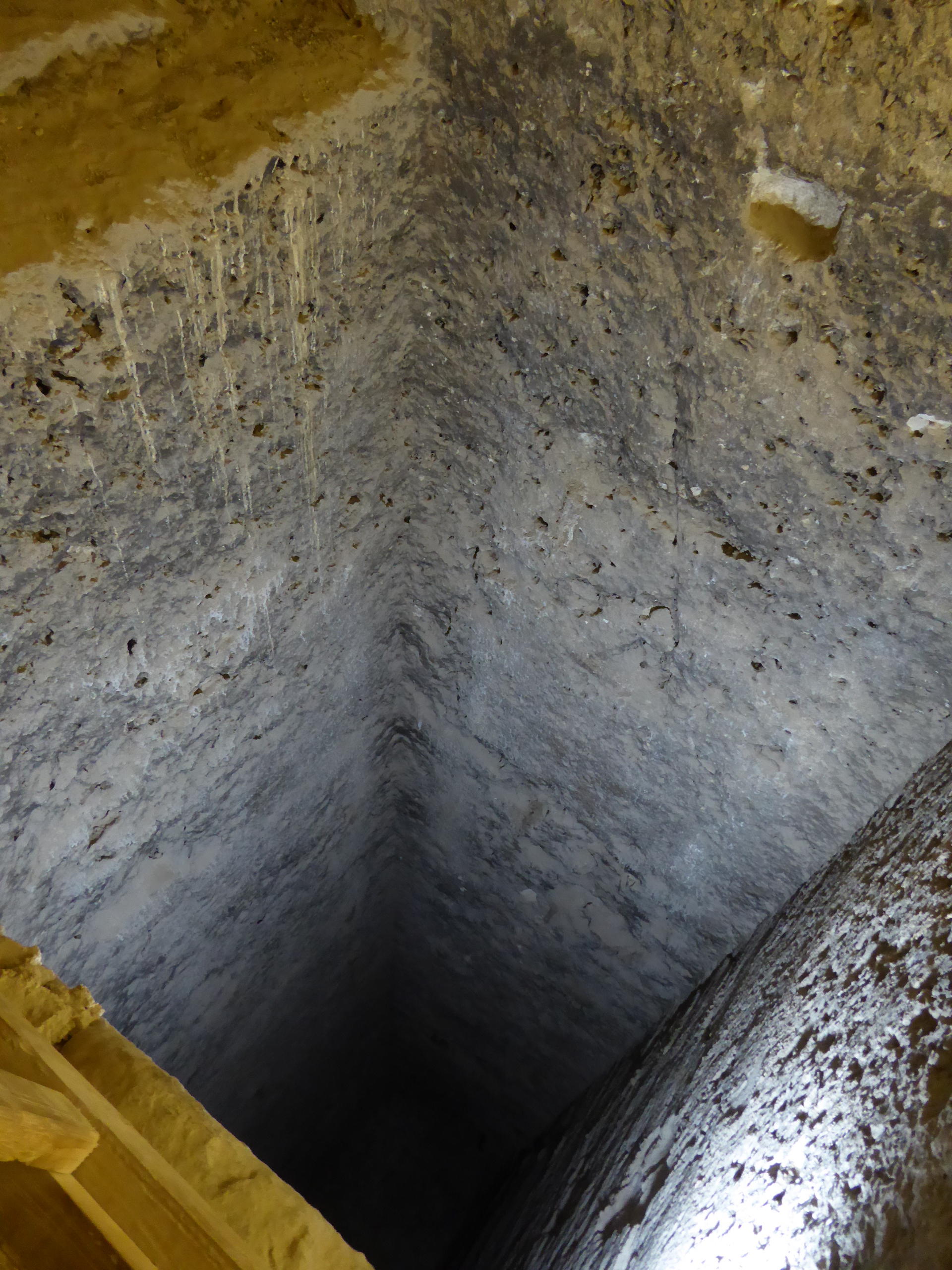
The 12 metre or 39 feet deep shaft obstacle in Penthu's tomb

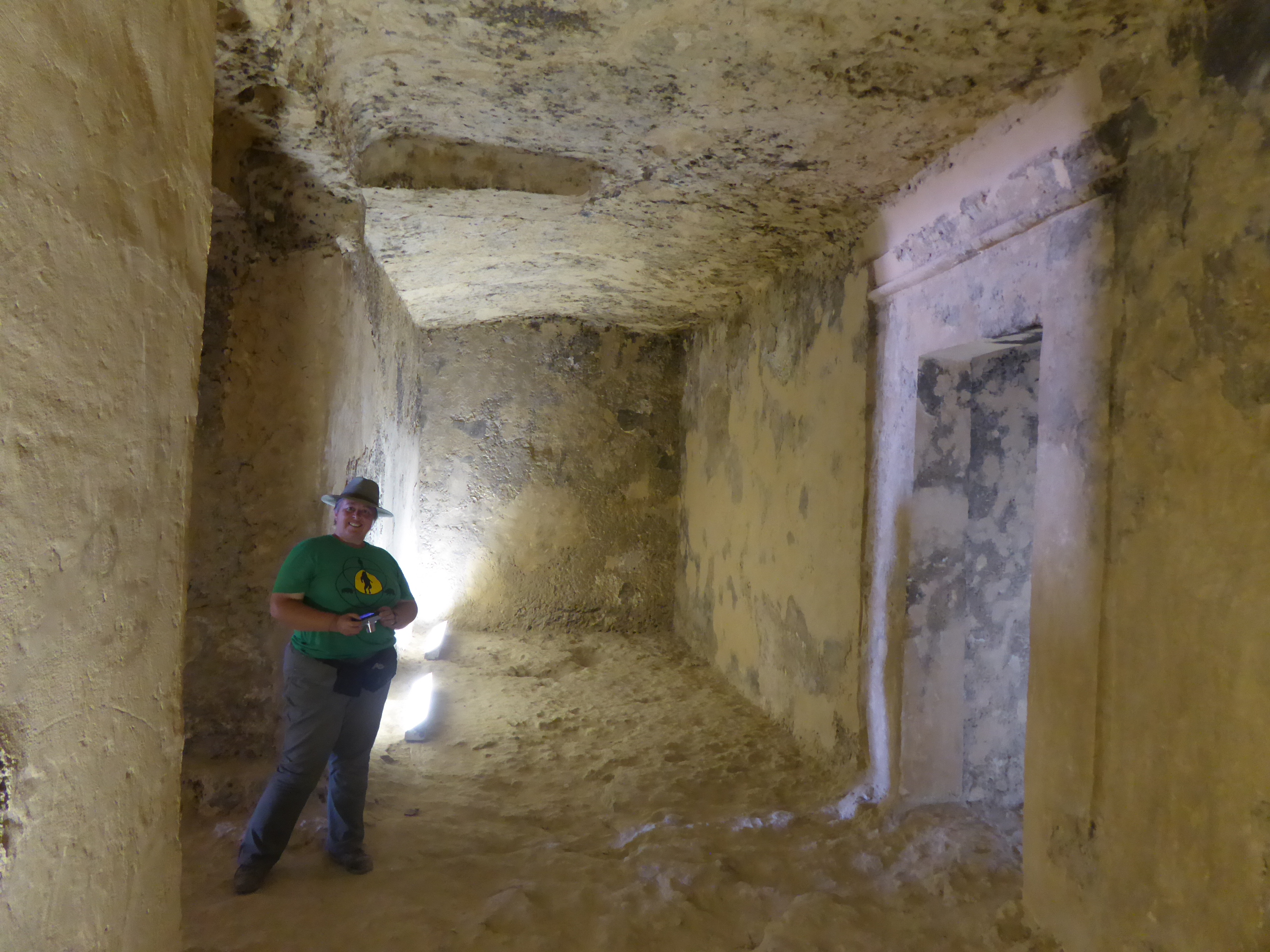
An unfinished burial chamber in Penthu's tomb
