= Pentu =

Ancient Egyptian vizier

- Vizier of the South
- Dynasty: 18th Dynasty
- Pharaoh: Tutankhamun

Pentu (Pentju) was a vizier of ancient Egypt. He served during the reign of Tutankhamun.

Pentu is only known from a wine jar docket found in the tomb of Tutankhamun. It has been suggested that Pentu the Vizier is identical to Penthu the Chief Physician to Akhenaten, owner of Tomb 5 in Amarna, but this identification cannot be proven.
