= Amenmose, son of Pendjerty =

- Royal Table Scribe
Egyptian name
i mn n ms w
- Dynasty: 19th Dynasty
- Pharaoh: Ramesses II
- Burial: TT 373
- Father: Pendjerty
- Mother: Mutemonet, named Inty

Amenmose, Son of Pendjerty (sometimes named Amenmessu) was a royal scribe from the time of Ramesses II. Amenmose was the son of the judge Pendjerty and the sistrum bearer of Amun, Mut and Khonsu, named Mutemonet.

== Life and career ==
A statue now in the British museum indicates that Amenmose's father Pendjerty was from Iwny (modern Esna).

p n M36 t Z4 O49 - Pendjerty in hieroglyphics

His mother's name is given as Mutemonet, and her name is shortened to Inty and Iny on different monuments.

i A2 n i i - Iny as written on the Manchester Museum statue
i A2 S3 Z1 Z1 i i - Name recorded in TT 373

Several of the monuments Amenmose left behind show the goddess Neith in a place of prominence, which may be a reference to the birthplace of his father. Neith was worshipped in Esna. In his tomb in Thebes Amenmose is said to be not only a scribe, but also the Head of the Temples. This may indicate that he inspected temples. Hibachi mentions that this may explain why his monuments were found in so many different locations.

== Monuments ==
Amenmose is known from several monuments:

- Theban tomb TT373. The tomb was discovered in 1948 when local inhabitants of Khohka found the tomb underneath one of their houses.
- A block statue now in Cairo (CGC 42,169)
- A statue fragment from Qantir.
- A statue in the British Museum (BM 137). Amenmose is said to be the son of Pendjerty and Inty.
- A statue from Tolemaita, Libya. Amenemone is said to be the son of the dignitary Pendjerty and of the sistrum-player Mutemonet.
- A squatting statue from Memphis. The statue is broken in two and part is located in the Vienna Kunsthistorisches Museum (Inv 5749) and part is now in the Manchester University Museum.

== See also ==
- List of ancient Egyptian scribes
