= Nakhtmin (scribe) =

- Lector Priest
Egyptian name
R22 R12 N35 M3 Aa1 X1
- Dynasty: 13th Dynasty

Nakhtmin (also written Minnakht) was lector priest of Min in Akhmim. The lector priest Nakhtmin is known from a stela now in the Archaeological Museum in Zagreb. The stela shows Nakhtmin raising his hands in adoration before an ithyphallic statue of Min. Saleh dates the stela to the Middle Kingdom of Egypt.

The round-topped stela's text provides hymns to Min and several forms of Horus. The text also contains an address to passers-by. Wiedemann (1891) dates the text to the early part of the Thirteenth Dynasty of Egypt.

== See also ==
- List of ancient Egyptian scribes
