= Wenshet =

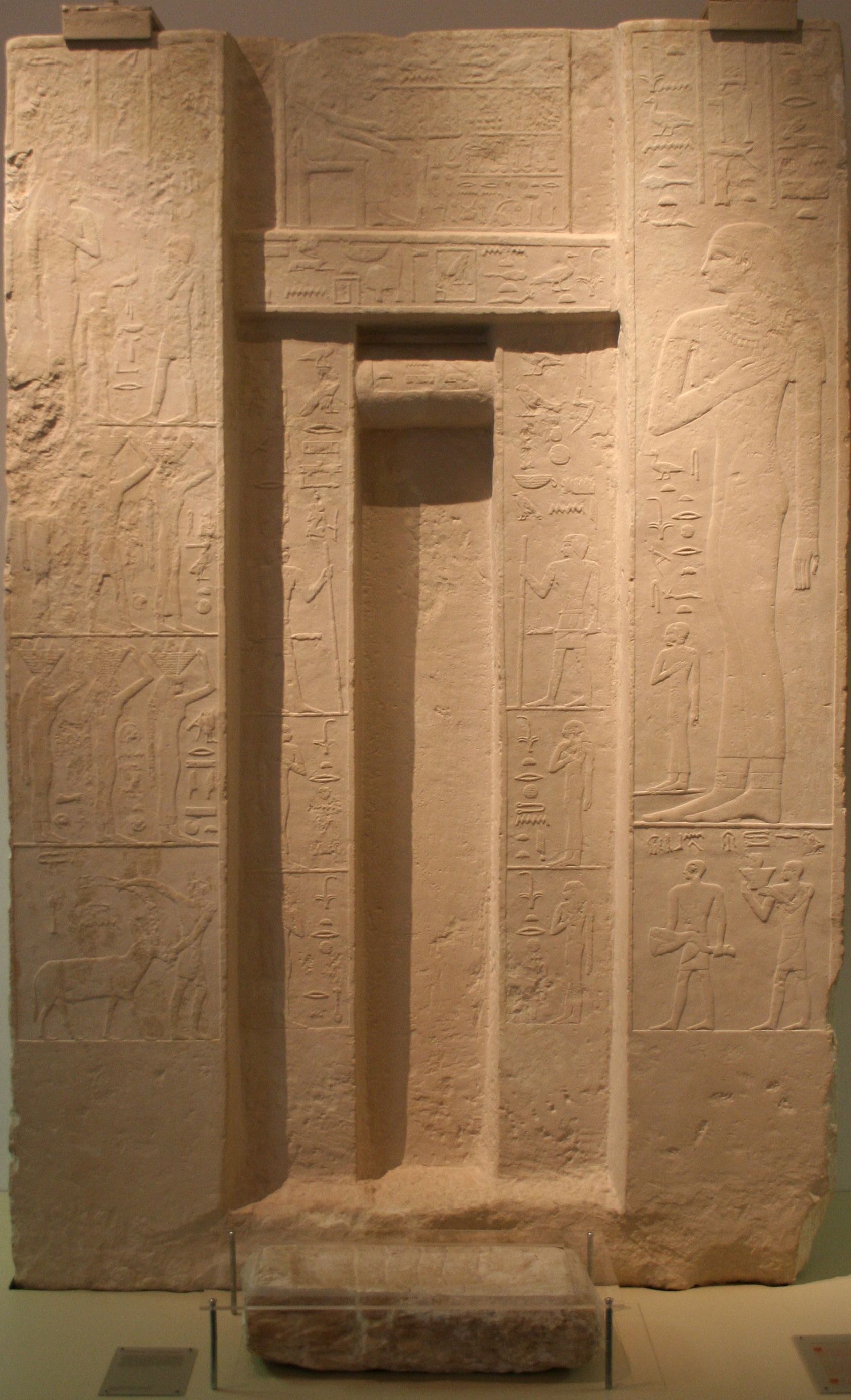
False door of the tomb of Wenshet

Wenshet, alternatively spelled Weneshet, was an ancient Egyptian princess who lived around 2500 BCE, probably after the reign of Khufu in the 4th Dynasty, though likely prior to the 5th dynasty. Wenshet is buried within the Giza Necropolis at tomb G 4840, a mastaba with one burial shaft and two chapels. The burial shaft, which was 2.1 by 2.1 metres [m] (6.9 ft × 6.9 ft) large, included a reserve head that was modeled in mud, whereas most examples of these heads were crafted from limestone. According to the art historian William Stevenson Smith, the reserve head has a projection at the back of the skull and another "bust-like" projection at the back of the base of the neck. The brows of the face were modeled, though they were never drawn. If this head belongs to Wenshet, then the tomb would constitute one of only three known instances in which a mastaba preserved both a reserve head and a stela.

The southern chapel consists of a singular white limestone room sized at around 5 by 1.5 metres [m] (16.4 ft × 4.9 ft) in area, with only 1 metre (3.3 ft) of its height surviving. Unusually, the northern chapel—which is marked by a fully decorated false door—seemingly bears a greater prominence than the southern chapel, which contains an undecorated false door situated within a chamber that is entered from the east. The false door, which was discovered on March 21, 1914, by Hermann Junker, currently resides in the Roemer- und Pelizaeus-Museum Hildesheim. According to the Egyptologist Peter Der Manuelian, it is possible that that the unusual location of the decorated false door may indicate that its position was altered at a later date. The decorations themselves depict various individuals, including her relatives, bringing offerings.

According to a limestone inscription by her tomb, she was the daughter of the king, the priestess of Hathor and Neith, and also the "mistress of the sycamore." The inscription by her tomb was adorned with a mortar composed of gypsum and calcium sulfite—it had acquired a pinkish color as a result of iron oxide exposure. The mortar has obscured certain hieroglyphs, rendering part of the text illegible. According to the Egyptologist Richard Newman, it is possible that the gypsum was intentionally utilized to remove part of the text, though gypsum was also a common material used as a mortar in ancient Egypt. The identification of this inscription is uncertain: Its characters are atypically large for a slab stela, yet they are also excessively small for the architrave of a false door, leaving either explanation unsatisfactory. Manuelian argues that the artifact is best categorized as a stela, noting that size of the inscription—which is 11–12 centimetres (4.3–4.7 in) tall—is comparable to other stelae, which often measure around 7–10 centimetres (2.8–3.9 in) in height. Moreover, Manuelian notes the lack of corresponding architrave fragments, which—according to Manuelian—casts doubt the identification of the artifact as such. If the object is designated as a stela, then the tomb serves one of the few known examples in which a stela and decorative walls—both of which belong to the same individual—were successfully preserved.
