= Amenemope (author) =

Ancient Egyptian writer

Amenemope (also Amen-em-ope), the son of Kanakht, is the ostensible author of the Instruction of Amenemope, an Egyptian wisdom text written in the Ramesside Period. He is portrayed as a scribe and sage who lived in Egypt during the 20th Dynasty of the New Kingdom and resided in Akhmim (ancient Egyptian Ipu, Greek Panopolis), the capital of the ninth nome of Upper Egypt. His discourses are presented in the traditional form of instructions from father to son on how to live a good and moral life, but (unlike most such texts) they are explicitly organized into 30 numbered chapters.

Although once thought to be unique, the Instruction is now seen to share common themes with the wisdom literature of other ancient Near Eastern cultures, including Babylonia and Israel, most notably the biblical books of Proverbs, Ecclesiastes, and Sirach, for which a Hebrew translation of the Instruction served as a source. Within the Book of Proverbs, verses Proverbs 22:17–23:11 closely parallel Amenemope's Instruction. The date of 1100 BCE places the authorship of the Instruction earlier than any part of the Bible, and egyptologists such as James Henry Breasted credit Amenemope with having a profound influence on Western ethical and religious development due to his Instruction being read by the Hebrews and portions of it being included, sometimes verbatim, in various books of the Bible. "It is likewise obvious that in numerous other places in the Old Testament, not only in the Book of Proverbs, but also the Hebrew law, in Job, ... in Samuel and Jeremiah, Amenemope's wisdom is the source of ideas, figures, moral standards, and especially of a certain warm and humane spirit of kindness." Amenemope, in turn, was drawing on a much older text, The Maxims of Ptahhotep.

== See also ==
- List of ancient Egyptian scribes
- Ancient Egyptian literature
- Wisdom literature
