= Chair of Reniseneb =

Egyptian wooden chair

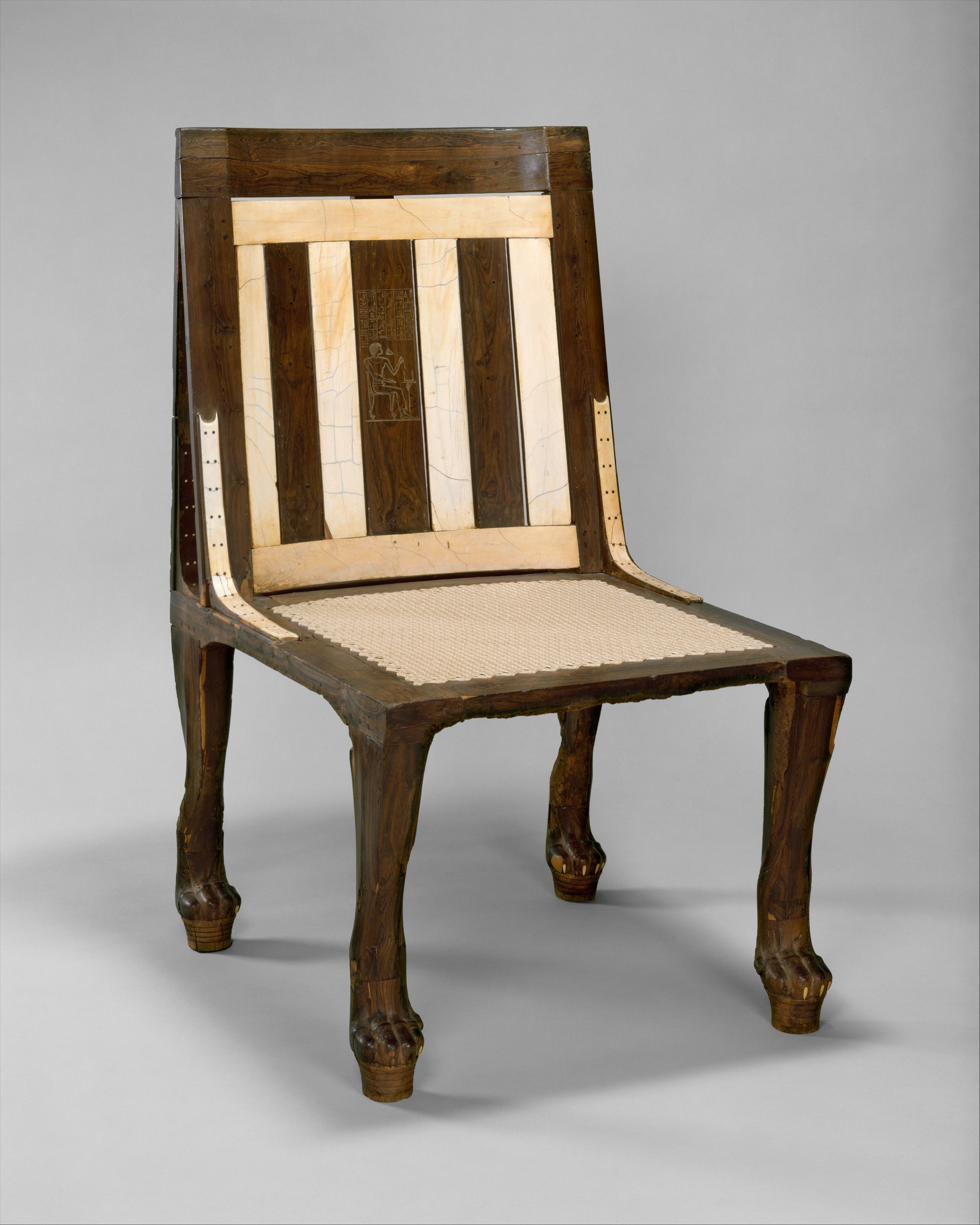
- Artist: Unknown
- Year: c. B.C 1450
- Medium: Wood, ebony and ivory
- Dimensions: 86.2 cm (33.9 in)
- Location: Metropolitan Museum of Art

The Chair of Reniseneb is an Egyptian wooden chair dated to the 15th century BC. The chair, currently on display at the Metropolitan Museum of Art, belonged to the Egyptian scribe Reniseneb.

== Description ==
The Chair was crafted circa 1450 BC during the reign of Thutmose III, sixth Pharaoh of the Eighteenth Dynasty of Egypt. Inscriptions on the chair indicate it belonged to the scribe Reniseneb (also referred to as Reni-seneb or Renyseneb). The chair is made from ebony and carved ivory. It is believed that the chair was originally less detailed than it currently is, and that additional inscriptions were added to the chair when Reniseneb died. The chair is notably the oldest (excluding royal chairs) surviving chair of its style from Egypt.

The seat of the chair is a reproduction made from woven reeds, as the original seat has long since decayed. An image of Reniseneb seated in a similar chair is carved into the backrest of the chair, and its feet take the form of carved lion claws. Lotus flowers are also depicted on the chair's carved ivory, possibly due to Egyptian's association of lotus flowers with rebirth and healing.

== Usage ==
The Metropolitan Museum of Art theorizes that the image and inscription might have been added after the death of Reniseneb so that it could be used in funeral rituals.
