= Kaaper =

Ancient Egyptian official depicted in wooden statue

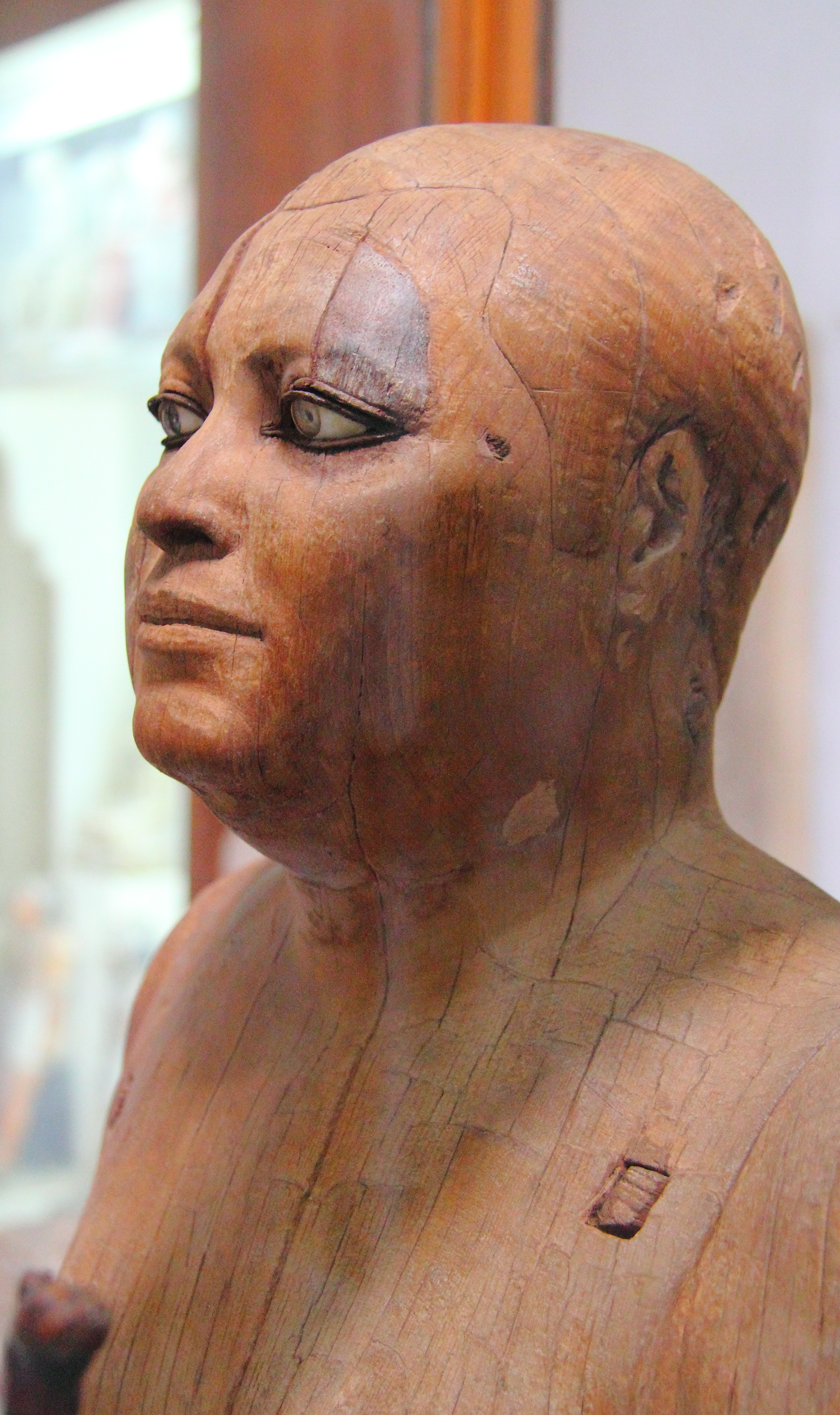
Closeup of Kaaper's statue CG 34

Kaaper or Ka’aper, (fl. c. 2500 BC) also commonly known as Sheikh el-Beled, was an ancient Egyptian scribe and priest who lived between the late 4th Dynasty and the early 5th Dynasty. Despite his rank not being among the highest, he is well-known due to his famously fine wooden statue.

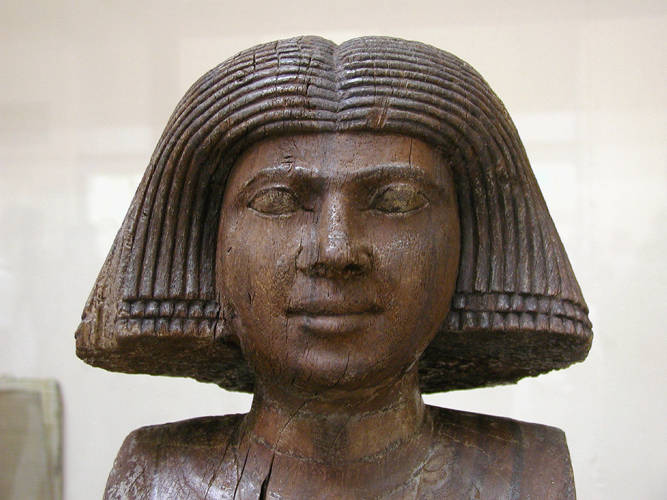
Statue of Kaaper's wife CG 33

== Career and life ==
Little is known of Kaaper's life. His titles were lector priest and army scribe of the King, the latter possibly linked to some military campaigns in the Southern Levant.

== Discovery ==
His mastaba, a flat-roofed tomb (named "Saqqara C8") was discovered in 1860 by Auguste Mariette in the Saqqara necropolis, just north of the Step Pyramid of Djoser. During the excavation, the Egyptian diggers unearthed the statue and, apparently impressed by its exceptional realism, they called it Sheikh el-Beled (Arabic for "Headman of the village") likely because of a certain similarity between the statue and their local elder.

== Description ==
The statue – located in the Cairo Egyptian Museum, CG 34 – is 112 centimetres (3.67 ft) tall and carved from sycamore wood, and in six or more sections depicts the corpulent Kaaper while walking with a staff. The statue's round, peaceful face is almost lifelike thanks to the eyes, which were made using rock crystal and small copper plates; it is often cited as an example of the remarkable level of craftmanship and realism achieved during the late 4th Dynasty. From the same mastaba also came a wooden statue of a woman, commonly considered to be Kaaper's wife (CG 33).

== In popular culture ==
In April 2025, Cypriot melodic death metal band "Ka'aper" (which is named after the ancient Egyptian priest) released the song "Eyes of Ka'aper".

== See also ==
- List of ancient Egyptian scribes
- Art of ancient Egypt
