= Ken-Amun =

- Royal Overseer
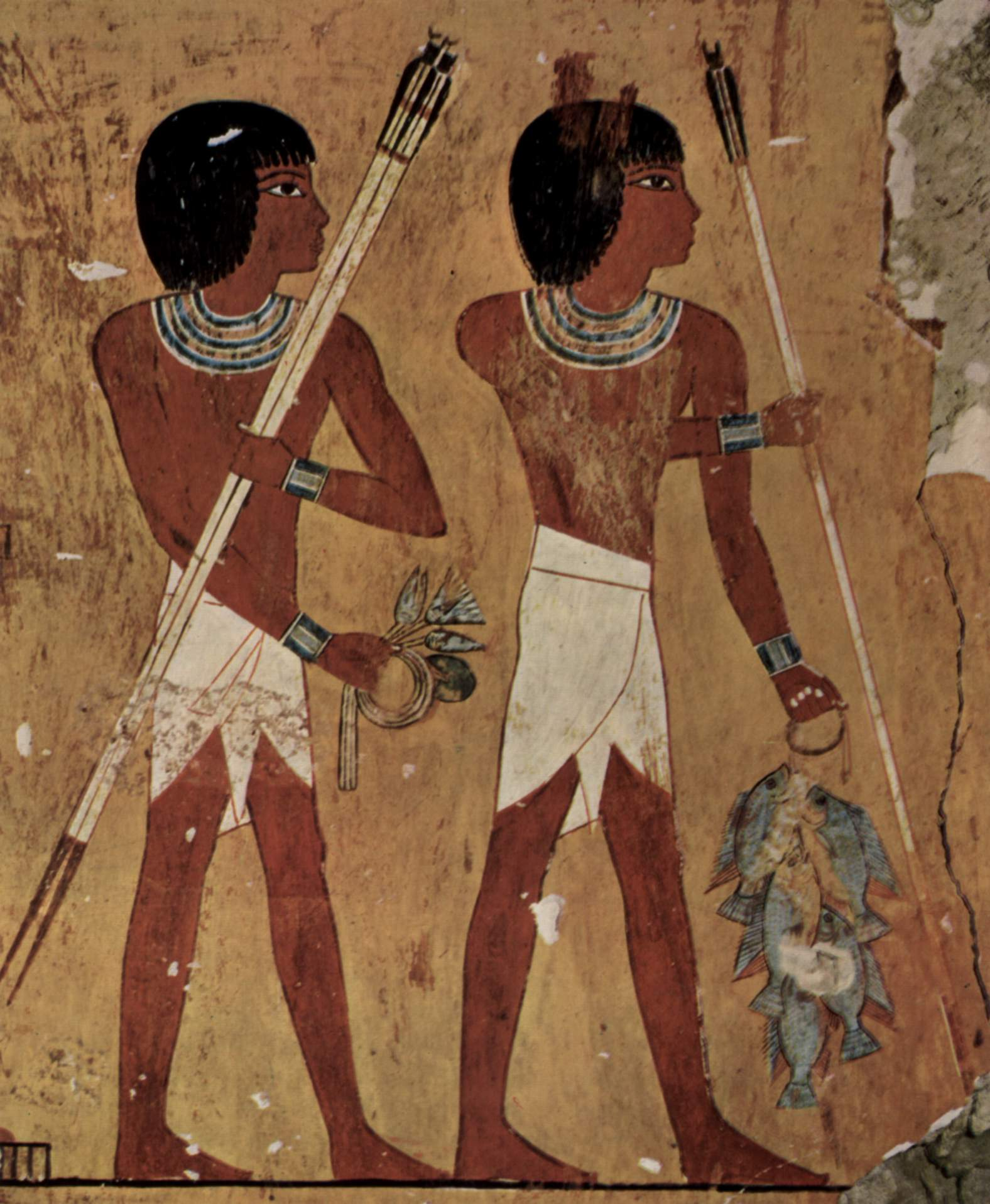
- Tomb of Ken-Amun
- Dynasty: 19th Dynasty
- Burial: Tell el-Maskhuta
- Spouse: Isis

Ken-Amun was overseer of the royal records during the 19th Dynasty of ancient Egypt. He was married to a woman named Isis, who was a singer of the god Atum. His tomb, discovered by Zahi Hawass in 2010 was found in Tell el-Maskhuta, near Ismailia, 75 miles (120 kilometers) east of Cairo.
