= TT255 =

Theban tomb

Coordinates: 25.7375°N 32.6245°E

Theban tomb TT255
- Burial site of Roy
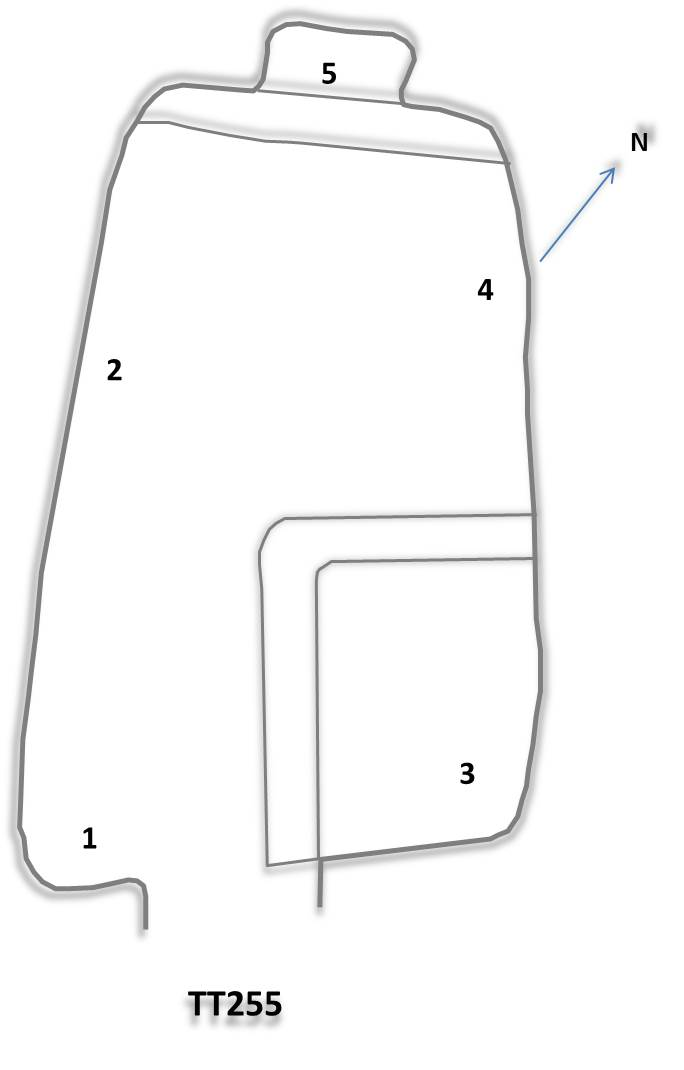
- Floor plan of TT255

- Location within Egypt
- Location: Dra' Abu el-Naga', Theban Necropolis
- ← Previous; TT254 Next → TT256

r Z1 i i and nb t N16 N16 N21 N21
Roy and Nebtawy
in hieroglyphs
Era: New Kingdom
(1550–1069 BC)

The Theban Tomb TT255 is located in Dra' Abu el-Naga', part of the Theban Necropolis, situated on the west bank of the Nile opposite Luxor. The sepulchre is the burial place of Roy, a royal scribe, and his wife Nebtawy (nicknamed Tawy), who lived at the end of the 18th Dynasty, during the reign of Horemheb. In addition to being a scribe, Roy was an overseer of the estates of both Horemheb and the god Amun.

The tomb is small, consisting of only one chamber with a stele niche and burial shaft, but it is well decorated. It is one of two tombs in Dra' Abu el-Naga' that is open to the public. The tomb is reached via a single ornamented chamber measuring only 4 by 1.85 metres that is carved out of the rock and has a funerary stela in a niche at the far end. The real burial chamber is reached via a funeral tomb-shaft that extends into the deep (to the right of the entryway). The tomb faces south-east and its corners are rounded and none of the walls are flat. The wall immediately to the left-hand side of the entrance is divided into four registers. Roy and his wife are seen before a man who is bringing a calf, and there are scenes of ploughing and pulling flax. Around the tops of the walls a frieze of Hathor heads, Anubis jackals and the titles of Roy and his wife can be seen. The ceiling of Roy's T255 tomb is painted in bright bold colours which remain vivid despite the passage of 3,200 years.

== Gallery ==
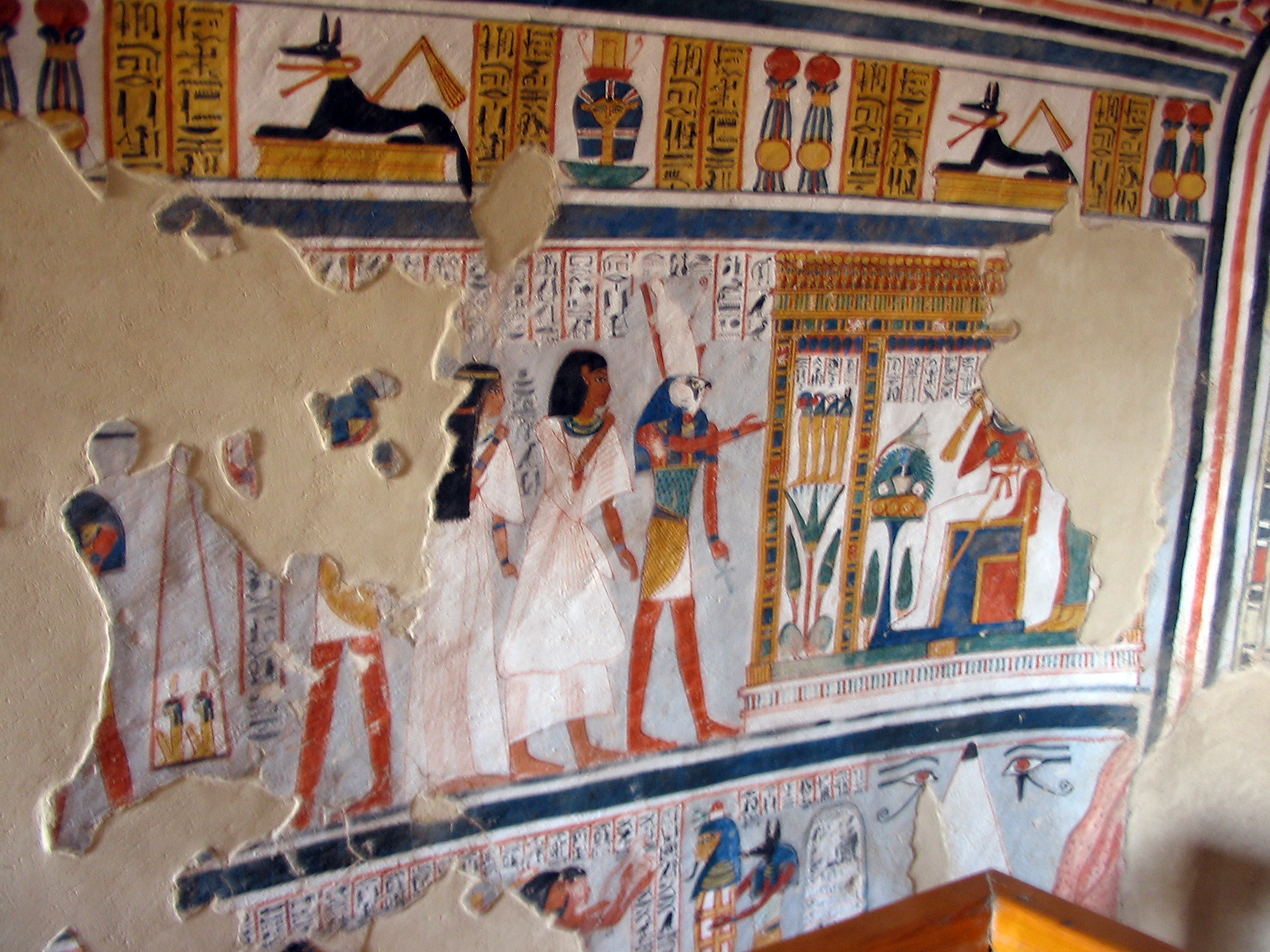
A vivid relief of TT255 depicting Roy and his wife in the afterlife.

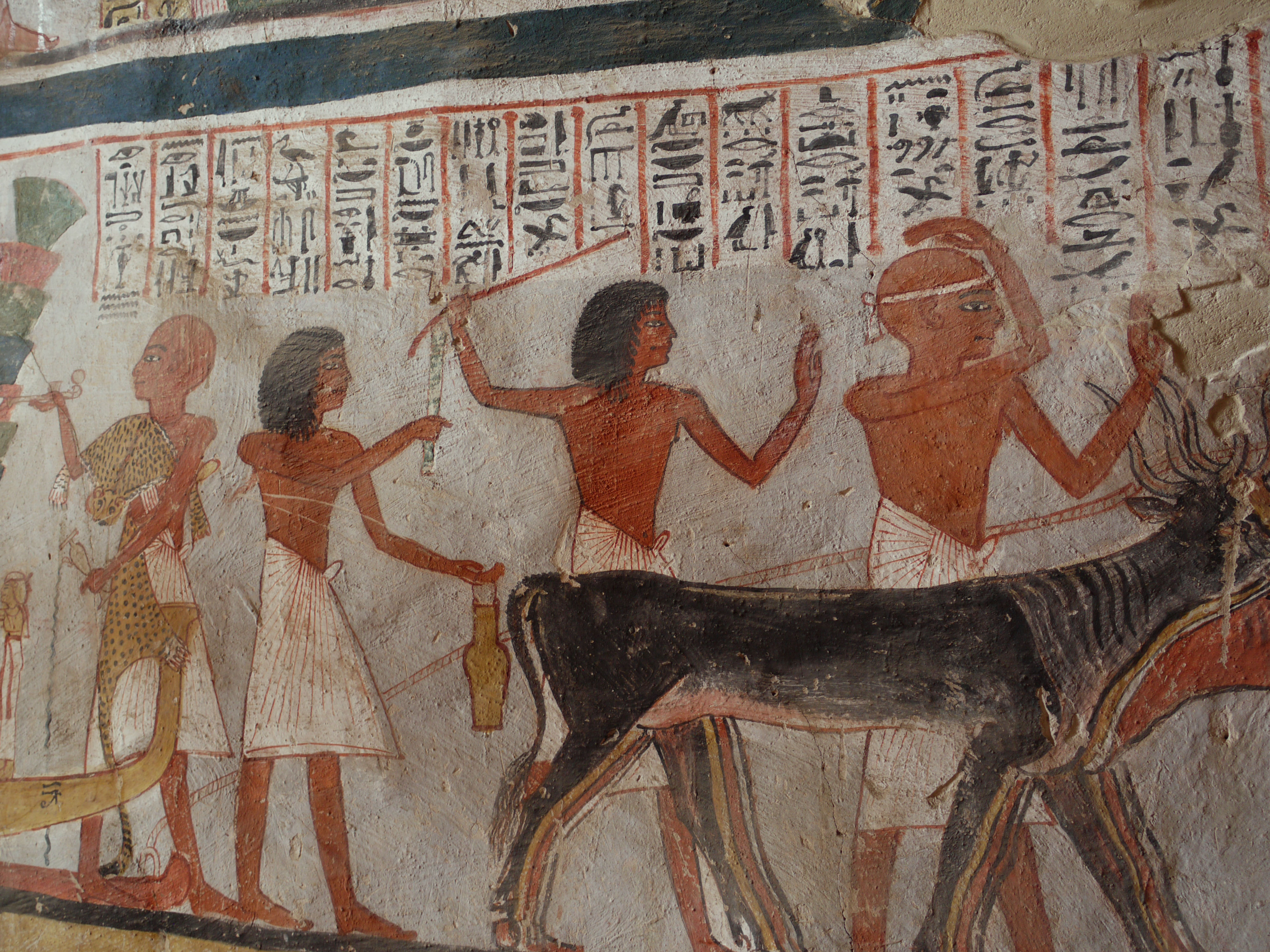
A relief scene of cattle being brought before Roy in TT255

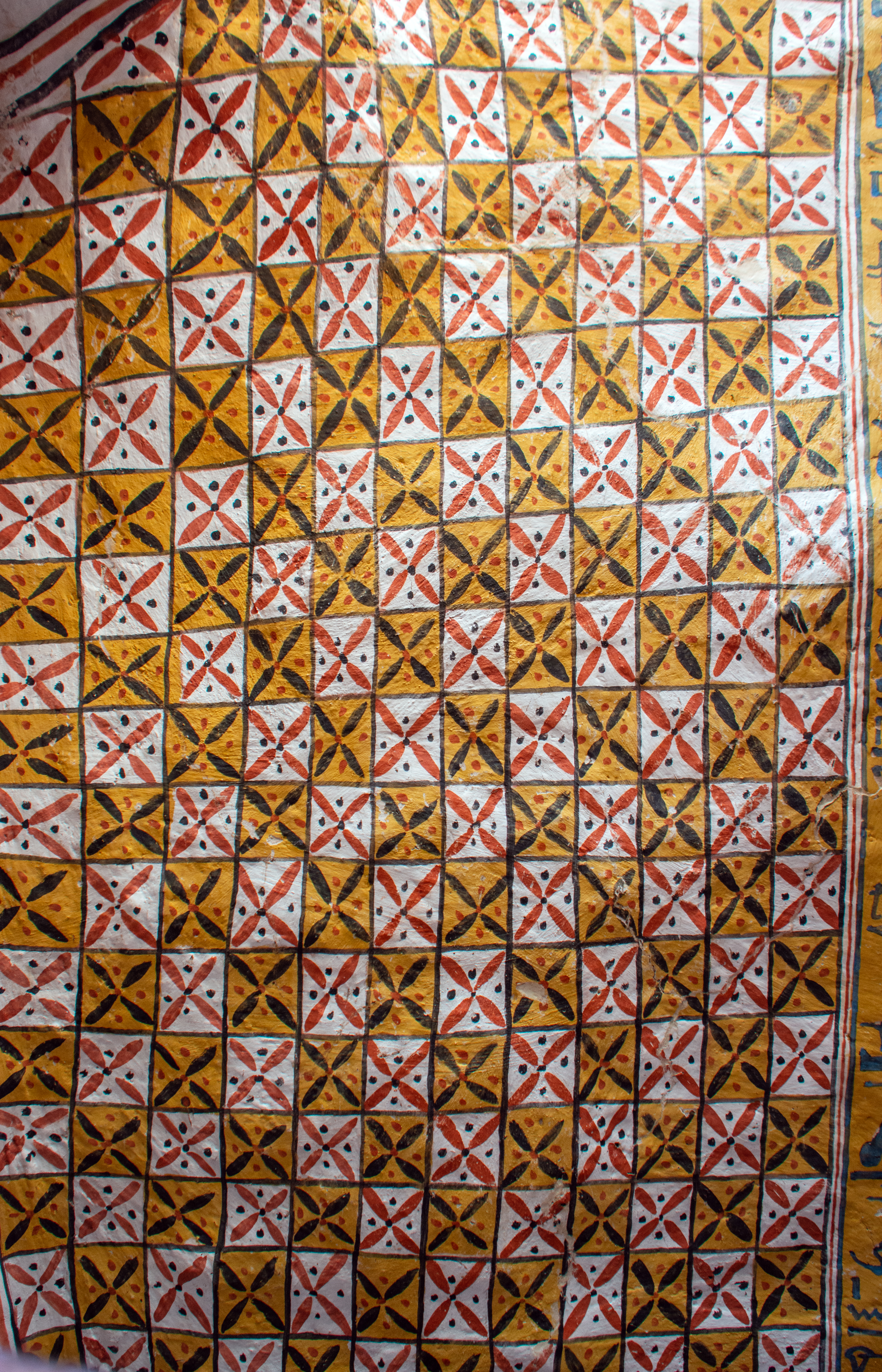
The painted ceiling of Tomb TT255

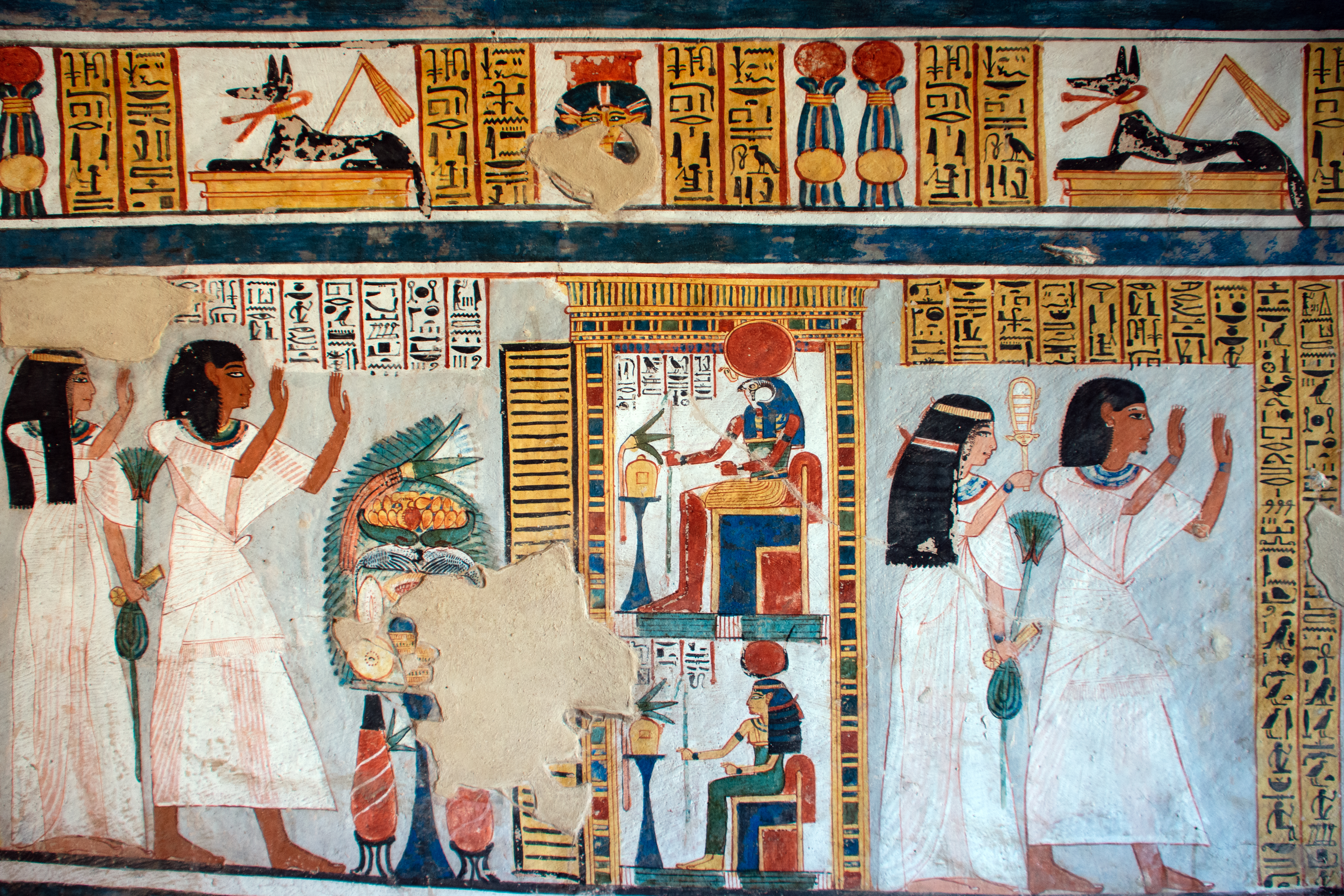
A vivid relief of Roy and his wife before Horus and Hathor

== See also ==
- List of Theban tombs
