= May (noble) =

Royal chancellor and fan-bearer of Akhet-Aten

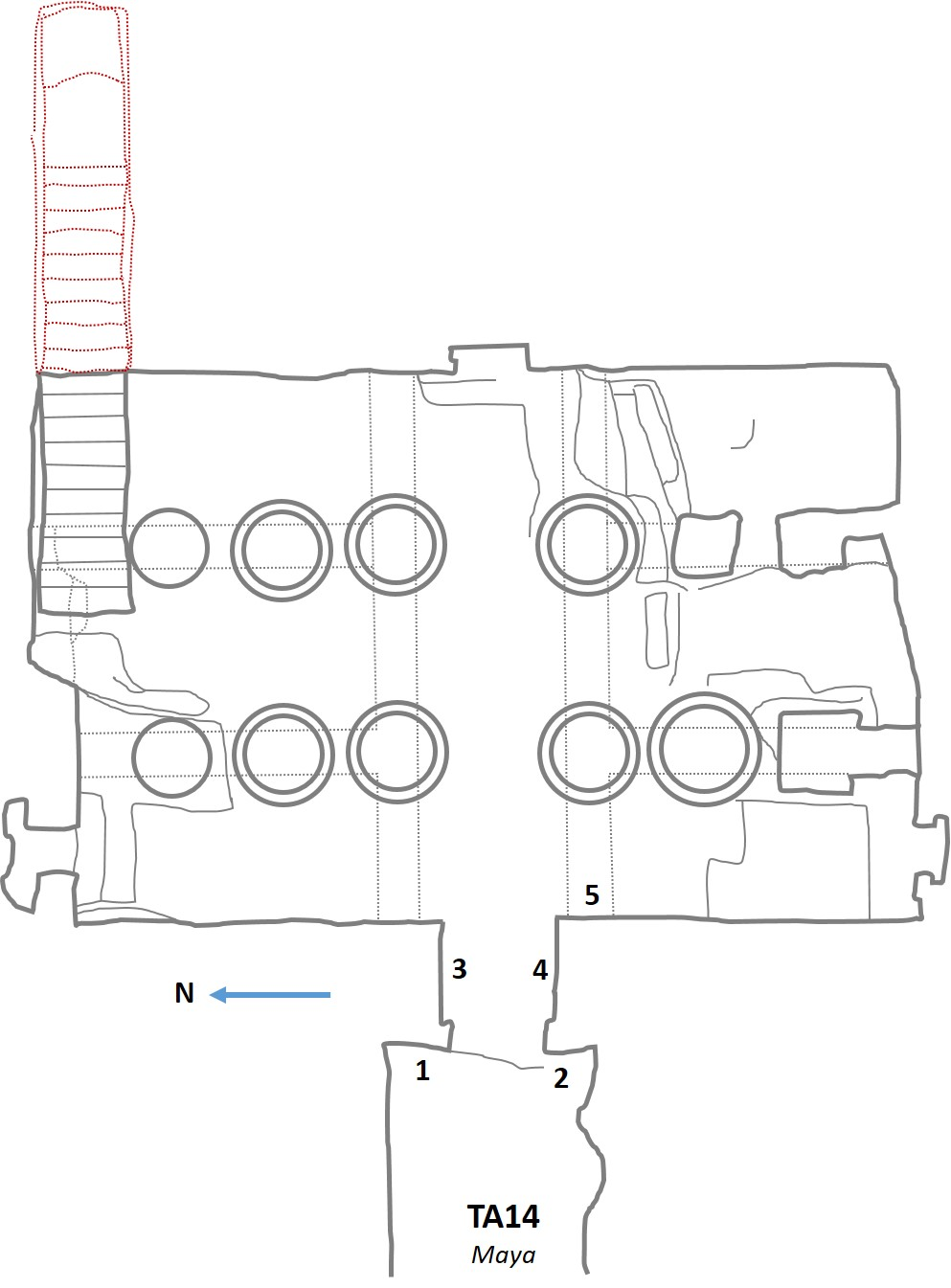
Plan of May's tomb EA14 at Amarna

May was an ancient Egyptian official during the reign of Pharaoh Akhenaten. He was Royal chancellor and fan-bearer at Akhet-Aten, the pharaoh's new capital. He was buried in Tomb EA14 in the southern group of the Amarna rock tombs. Norman de Garis Davies originally published details of the Tomb in 1908 in the Rock Tombs of El Amarna, Part V – Smaller Tombs and Boundary Stelae. The tomb dates to the late 18th Dynasty.

== Biography ==
May declared that the king was the one who raised him up from humble beginnings: "I was a poor man on both my father's and my mother's side; but the ruler built me up, he developed me, he fed me by means of his spirit (ka) says the king's fan-bearer, May."

May held a variety of titles. He held the title of iry-pat (prince), and he was a royal sealer, a sole companion, scribe of the King and the Overseer of all the works of the King. His military titles include Overseer of the soldiery of the Lord of the Two lands and scribe of recruits. He was also the Overseer of the house of Sehetep-Aten. This title also appears on ostraca found in Amarna and may refer to a royal person or a temple. May was also the Overseer of the House of Waenra in Heliopolis, and the Overseer of the cattle of the temple of Ra in Heliopolis. These positions would have made him responsible for some of the aspects of temple life in Heliopolis.

May may be the same person as the treasurer named Maya, who served Tutankhamen. May shares some of the titles with Maya, but he was not a treasurer.

== Tomb ==
This large tomb was filled with sand and initially not excavated by Bouriant in 1883. The tomb was later excavated by Barsanti and the texts were published by Daressy.

The entrance of the tomb leads to a pillared hall. Only the pillars in the center have been completed. The space is much damaged by both bats and a possible fire. The entrance of the tomb provides a scene where Akhenaten and Nefertiti are presenting a censer and libations to the Aten. The royal couple are followed by three of their daughters and the Queen's sister Mutbenret. The latter is accompanied by two dwarfs who are named Para and Re-neheh. In other scenes May is shown praying. Davies mentions that May's name has been excised and his image destroyed.

The west wall of the hall contains an interesting scene. It was started in ink and not finished, but appears to show the reward of May at the balcony of the palace. The scene includes a building and what appears to be a Window of Appearance. Below that we see vegetation and the river's edge. Men are shown working with oars and fisher nets. Landings are depicted with at one landing the barge of the King, and at the other the barge of the Queen. These barges are distinguished by both their size and the heads of the royals. The barge of Akhenaten shows his head wearing an Atef crown on top of the steering paddle. The barge of Nefertiti is decorated with her head wearing the double plumes.
