= Anonymous Tombs in Amarna =

Archaeological site in Egypt

Coordinates: 27.6617°N 30.9056°E

The Anonymous Tombs in Amarna are ancient Tombs of Nobles at the Royal Wadi in Amarna, Upper Egypt. They consist of both sepulchres and burial pits in varying stages of construction.

== Amarna Tombs 7–a, b, c ==
Amarna Tombs 7–a, b, c are small unfinished tombs located near Tomb 7 (The tomb of Parennefer). Tombs 7a and 7b are very small. Tomb 7c had some columns completed, but no inscriptions were evident.

== Amarna Tombs 9–a, b, c ==
Small unfinished tombs located near Tomb 9 (The tomb of Mahu). All three tombs are very simple in construction.

== Amarna Tomb 16 ==
The tomb owner's name has not been preserved. The owner is shown kneeling in adoration before the sun. Contrary to most tombs the owner faces northeast in this tomb. The tomb was said to have contained "burials in palm-sticks, coffins, etc."

== Amarna Tomb 17 ==
Davies describes this tomb as having no interesting features. Some pottery was found in the excavations, including a small pot with a foot and some saucers.

== Amarna Tomb 18 ==
Only the facade of the tomb was completed. The tomb is of the corridor type. A hieroglyphic inscription was written on the left jamb of the outer door. The lower part of the inscription is too damaged to read the name of the tomb owner.

== Amarna Tomb 20 ==
The lintel shows the royal family adoring the deity Aten. We see the same scene on the left and the right but in mirror image. Akhenaten is shown on both sides wearing the khepresh crown. Nefertiti and her daughters were never carved. The inscriptions show that Nefertiti was supposed to follow her husband, followed by Meritaten, Meketaten and Ankhesenpaaten. Behind the princesses the Queen's sister Mutnodjemet is depicted.

== Amarna Tomb 21 ==
While cutting the entranceway, the workers cut column bases from the existing stone.

== Amarna Tomb 22 ==
The lintel shows the royal family adoring the Aten. Akhenaten is shown wearing the Khepresh crown. Nefertiti, wearing her blue crown, followed her husband, followed by three princesses, probably Meritaten, Meketaten and Ankhesenpaaten. Behind the princesses the Queen's sister Mutnodjemet is depicted.
