= Tombs of the Nobles (Amarna) =

Archaeological site in Amarna, Egypt

Coordinates: 27.6617°N 30.9056°E

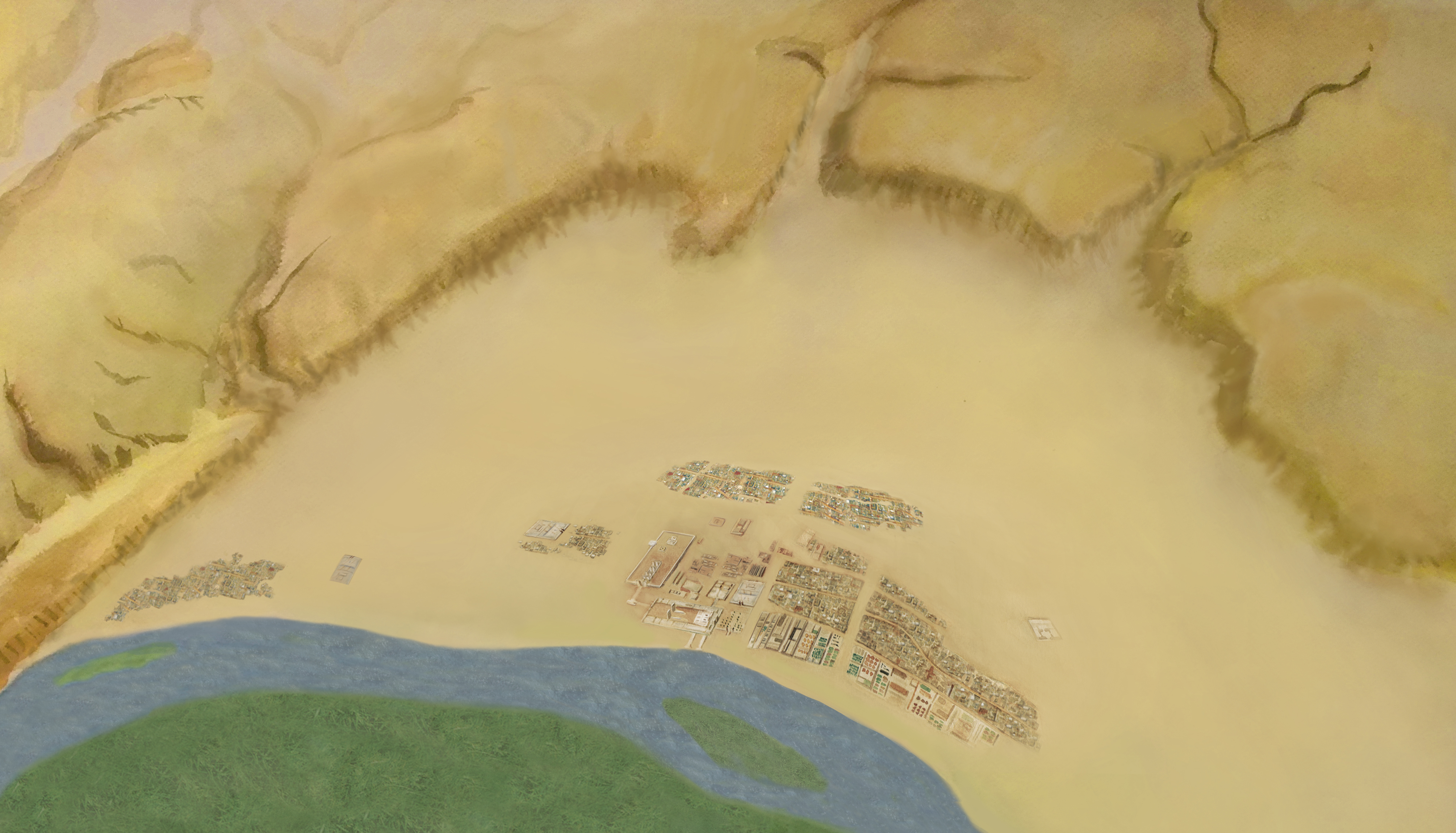

Located in Middle Egypt, the Tombs of the Nobles at Amarna are the burial places of some of the powerful courtiers and persons of the city of Akhetaten.

The tombs are in two groups, cut into the cliffs and bluffs in the east of the dry bay of Akhetaten. There are 25 major tombs, many of them decorated and with their owner's name, some are small and unfinished, others modest and unassuming. Each seems to reflect the personality and patronage of the tomb's original owner.

== Northern tombs ==
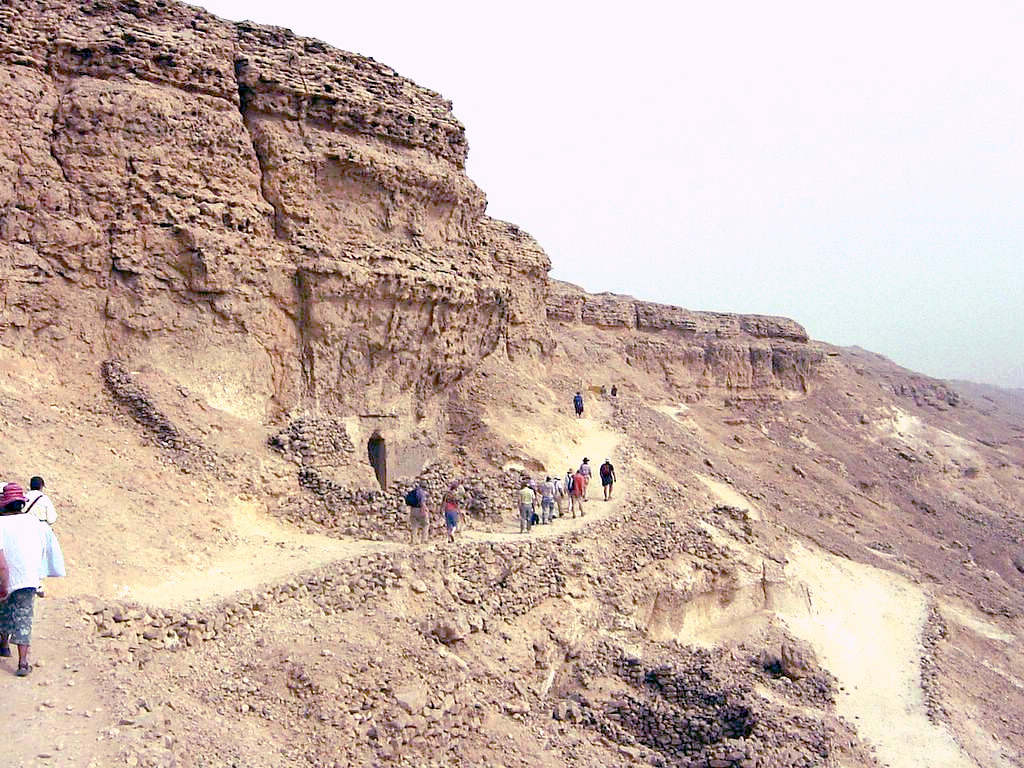
Northern Tombs at Amarna, looking south along the cliffs

These tombs are located in two groups in the cliffs overlooking the city of Akhetaten, to the North and East of the city. They are split into two groups by a wadi, and are near one of the Boundary Stelae (Stela V).

Tomb number	Owner	Title	Comments
Amarna Tomb 1	Huya	Steward of Queen Tiye	
Amarna Tomb 2	Meryre II	Overseer of the houses in the royal quarters of the Great Royal Wife Neferneferuaten-Nefertiti	
Amarna Tomb 3	Ahmes	Sealbearer of the King of Lower Egypt, Steward in the house of Akhenaten	
Amarna Tomb 4	Meryra (also called Meryre I)	Greatest of seers of the Aten in Akhetaten	Incomplete. Had it been completed, it would have been the largest of the noble's tombs.
Amarna Tomb 5	Penthu	First servant of the Aten in the mansion of the Aten in Akhetaten, Chief of physicians, chamberlain	The tomb was cross-shaped, containing a long outer hall, and a long transverse hall, containing the burial shaft and a now destroyed shrine to Penthu. Only the outer hall is decorated.
Amarna Tomb 6	Panehsy	First servant of the Aten in the house of Aten in Akhetaten	This was originally a two-roomed tomb; each of the rooms had four columns. Later reuse as a Coptic church has changed the layout and damaged the original decoration.

=== Desert altars ===
At a short distance to the west and north of the Northern Tombs lie the remains of three large mud-brick solar altars in the form of platforms with ramps. The reason for their location is not clear. Their connection with an ancient road leading to the Northern Tombs would seem to be a sign that they were for the benefit of those buried in them.

== Southern tombs ==
The southern tombs are located in a series of low bluffs south and east of the main city. Associated with these tombs, a recently discovered workers cemetery has been found.

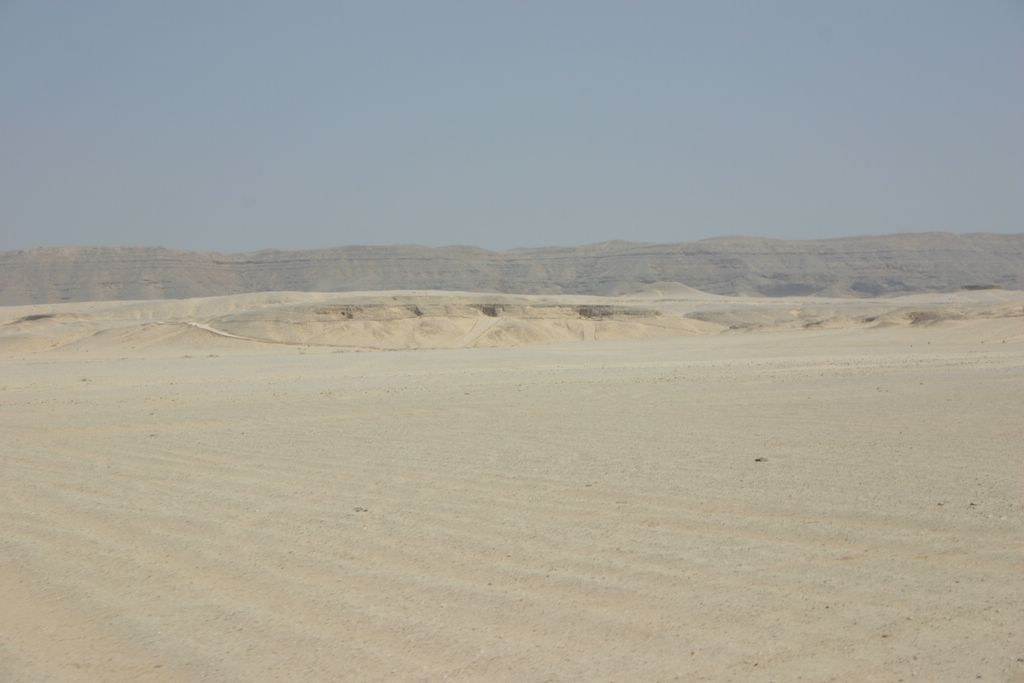
Southern Tombs at Amarna, showing cliffs behind

Tomb number	Owner	Title	Comments
Amarna Tomb 7	Parennefer	Cupbearer of the king's Person	Parennefer had another tomb in Thebes, TT188
Amarna Tomb 7a,b,c	Unknown		Small unfinished tombs located near Tomb 7.
Amarna Tomb 8	Tutu	Chamberlain of the Lord of the Two Lands, etc.	
Amarna Tomb 9	Mahu	Chief of the Medjay (police) of Akhetaten	
Amarna Tomb 9a,b,c	Unknown		Small unfinished tombs located near Tomb 9.
Amarna Tomb 10	Ipy	King's scribe, the overseer of the large inner palace of the pharaoh	
Amarna Tomb 11	Ramose	Scribe of Recruits, General of the Lord of the Two Lands	
Amarna Tomb 12	Nakhtpaaten	Hereditary prince, count, sealbearer, overseer of the city and vizier, etc.	
Amarna Tomb 13	Neferkheperuhesekheper	Mayor of Akhetaten	
Amarna Tomb 14	May	General of the Lord of the Two Lands, etc.	
Amarna Tomb 15	Suti	Standard-bearer of the company of Neferkheprure-Waenre (Akhenaten)	
Amarna Tomb 16	unknown		
Amarna Tomb 17	unknown		
Amarna Tomb 18	unknown		Only the facade of the tomb was completed
Amarna Tomb 19	Satau	Treasurer of the Lord of the Two Lands	
Amarna Tomb 20	unknown		The lintel shows the royal family adoring the Aten
Amarna Tomb 21	unknown		
Amarna Tomb 22	unknown		The lintel shows the royal family adoring the Aten
Amarna Tomb 23	Any	Scribe of the offering table of the Lord of the Two Lands, Steward of the House of Aakheprure (Amenhotep II), etc.	
Amarna Tomb 24	Paatenemheb	General of the Lord of the Two Lands, Steward of the Lord of the Two Lands	
Amarna Tomb 25	Ay	Fanbearer on the right of the King, God's Father, The commander of all the horses of his Person	Ay was a future pharaoh of Ancient Egypt
Southern Tomb 25a	Ia (?)		

== Rediscovery and excavation ==
Some of the tombs have obviously been open since antiquity, and have been used variously as burial places in the Ptolemaic times, storehouses, houses and as Coptic churches.

== See also ==
- Anonymous Tombs in Amarna

== Notes and references ==
=== Further reading ===
- N. de G. Davis – The Rock Cut Tombs of El Amarna. Society for the Study of Egyptian Antiquities, 2004 (ISBN 0856981605). Facsimils in Internet Archive: Part I. The Tomb of Meryre, 1903; Part II. The Tombs of Panehesy and Meryra II, 1905; Part III. The Tombs of Huya and Ahmes, 1905; Part IV. The Tombs of Penthu, Mahu and Others, 1906; Part V. Smaller Tombs and Boundary Stelae, 1908 y Part VI. Tombs of Parennefer, Tutu and Ay, 1908.
- Owen, Gwil – The Amarna courtiers' tombs. Egyptian Archaeology Autumn 2000
