= Southern Tomb 23 =

Ancient Egyptian tomb

Coordinates: 27.6617°N 30.9056°E

- Burial site of Any
- Location within Egypt
- ← Previous; Amarna Tomb 22 Next → Amarna Tomb 24

Southern Tomb 23 is a sepulchre in Amarna, Egypt. It was used for the burial of Any, whose titles included, Royal scribe, Scribe of the offering-table of the Aten, Steward of the estate of Aakheperura (Amenhotep II).

== Architectural features ==
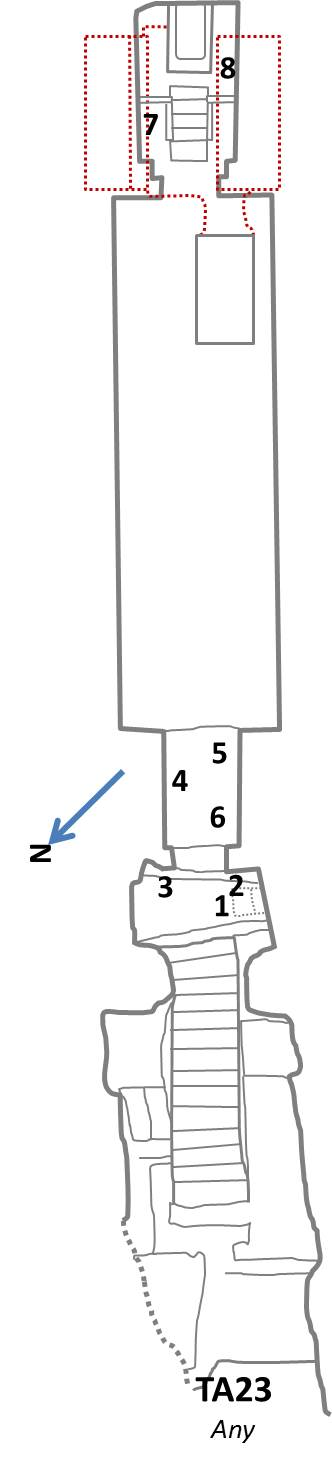
Plan of the tomb of Any

The entrance is not completed, but the design was meant to include a portico. This feature was meant to be executed as two separate porches on either side of the colonnaded entryway. The portal shows customary scenes showing the King and the Queen. In this case they are accompanied by three daughters. The later form of the cartouches is found on the door jambs indicating that the tomb was inscribed after year 9 of Akhenaten.

The shorter version of the Great Hymn to the Aten appears in the entrance way. The hymn is followed by the name and titles of Any. He is said to be

The intimate of the King, whom the lord loves, the favorite whom the Lord of the Two Lands created by his bounty, who has reached the blessed reward by the favor of the King, the acting scribe of the King, beloved by him. Scribe of the Altar of the Lord of the Two Lands, Scribe of the Offering Table of the Aten in Akhetaten, Steward if the house of King Aa-kheperur-ra, Any.

The tomb's corridor design resembles some of the northern group of tombs. It has 2 unfinished porches on either side of the door and is only basically decorated. The walls are not decorated but a colored corniche runs along the top of the wall.

The burial shaft was cut into the floor of the corridor. A door on the wall of the shaft gives access to a room that extends underneath the shrine in the tomb. The shrine contains a statue of the deceased seated on a chair. He is seated on a platform and there is a set of chairs leading up to the platform. In this case it is clearly the deceased who is venerated and not the King or some god.

== Votive stelae ==
When the tomb was first cleared by Barsanti in 1891 six stele donated by officials and a brother of Any for the burial were discovered.

Votive stelae from the tomb of Any
Name of donor	Title	Description	Notes
Pakha	Overseer of the Works	Pakha presents Any with a bouquet of lotus flowers	Steindorff reads the names as Pa-kharu "the Syrian"
Nebwawi	Scribe	The stele shows two registers. At the top Nebwawi is shown before Any. At the bottom Nebwawi offers an ox.	
Any-men	Servant	Any is seated on a chair in front of a latticed door which leads to the shrine. Any-men present him with a large jar of wine.	
Thay	Charioteer of the royal scribe Any	The stela depicts Any in a chariot with Thay.	The only stele not to provide for the Ka of Any.
[Ptah?]May	His brother	[Ptah]May stands before a seated Any.	The signs before "May" have been erased. Davies mentions the reading "the Scribe May" is also possible.
Ay	Servant	Ay presents Any with a bouquet of lotus flowers	

== See also ==
- Southern Tombs Cemetery
