= Amarna Tomb 8 =

- Burial site of Tutu
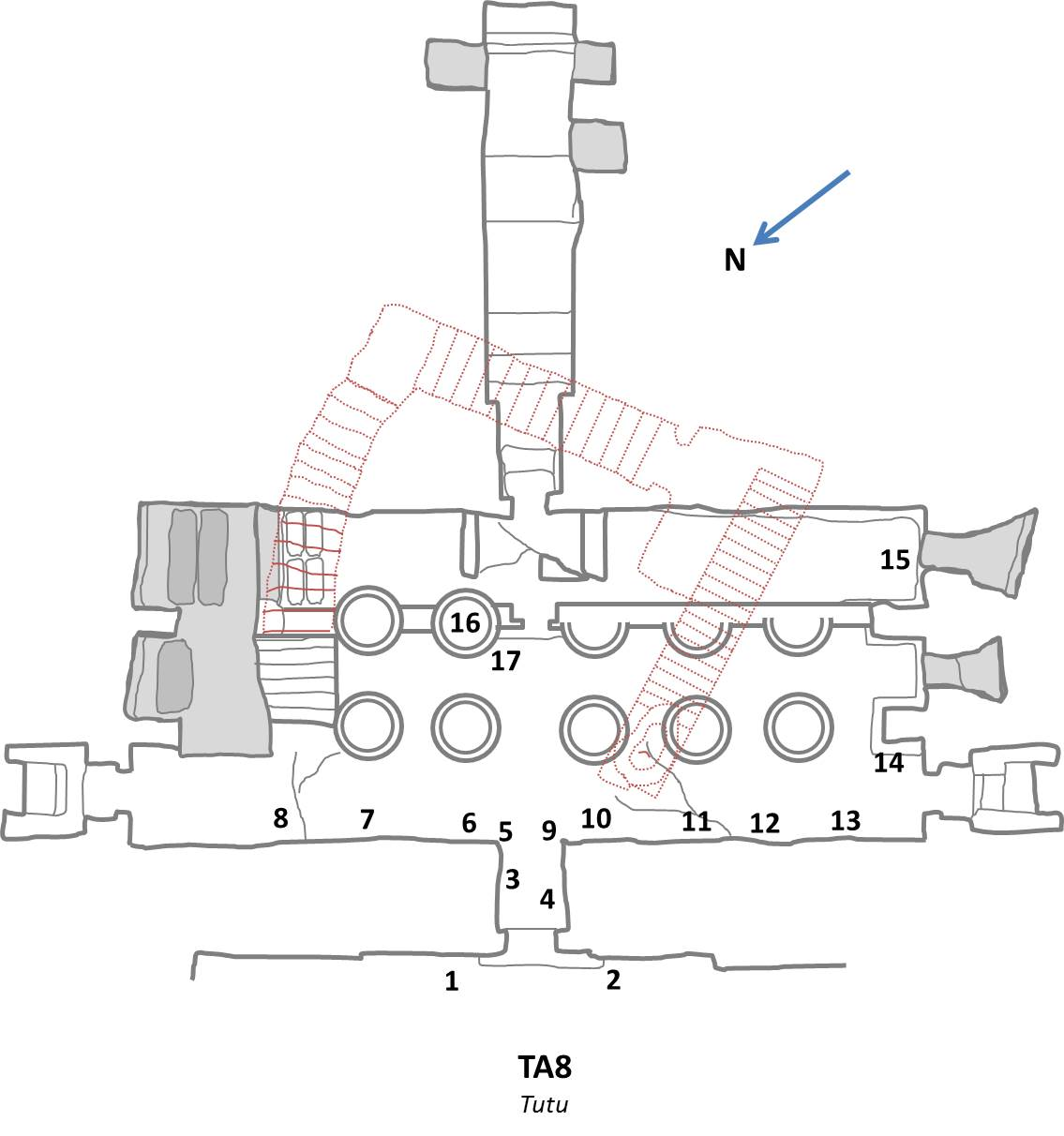
- Plan of the tomb of Tutu
- Location: Amarna
- ← Previous; Amarna Tomb 7 Next → Amarna Tomb 9

Amarna Tomb 8 or TA8 was one of the Tombs of the Nobles located in the area of ancient Akhetaten, today known as Amarna, the capital desired and built by the pharaoh Akhenaten of the 18th dynasty. The city was abandoned about 30 years after its foundation; the tombs were abandoned and partly reused in modern times as hermitages of Coptic monks. The millenary abandonment and the damage caused by human presence have often made the original structures unrecognizable and heavily damaged, if not made illegible, and the same scenario occurred to the tomb pictorial scenes and wall reliefs.

== The Tomb Owner ==
TA8 belonged to a certain Tutu who held the title of Chamberlain; Chief servant of Neferkheperura-waenra Akhenaten in the house of Aten in Akhetaten; Chief servant of Akhenaten on the boat wia; Overseer of all the craftsmen of the Lord of the Two Lands; Overseer of all the works of His Majesty; Overseer of the silver and gold of the Lord of the Two Lands; Overseer of the treasury of Aten in Akhetaten and Chief of the spokesmen.

== The Tomb ==
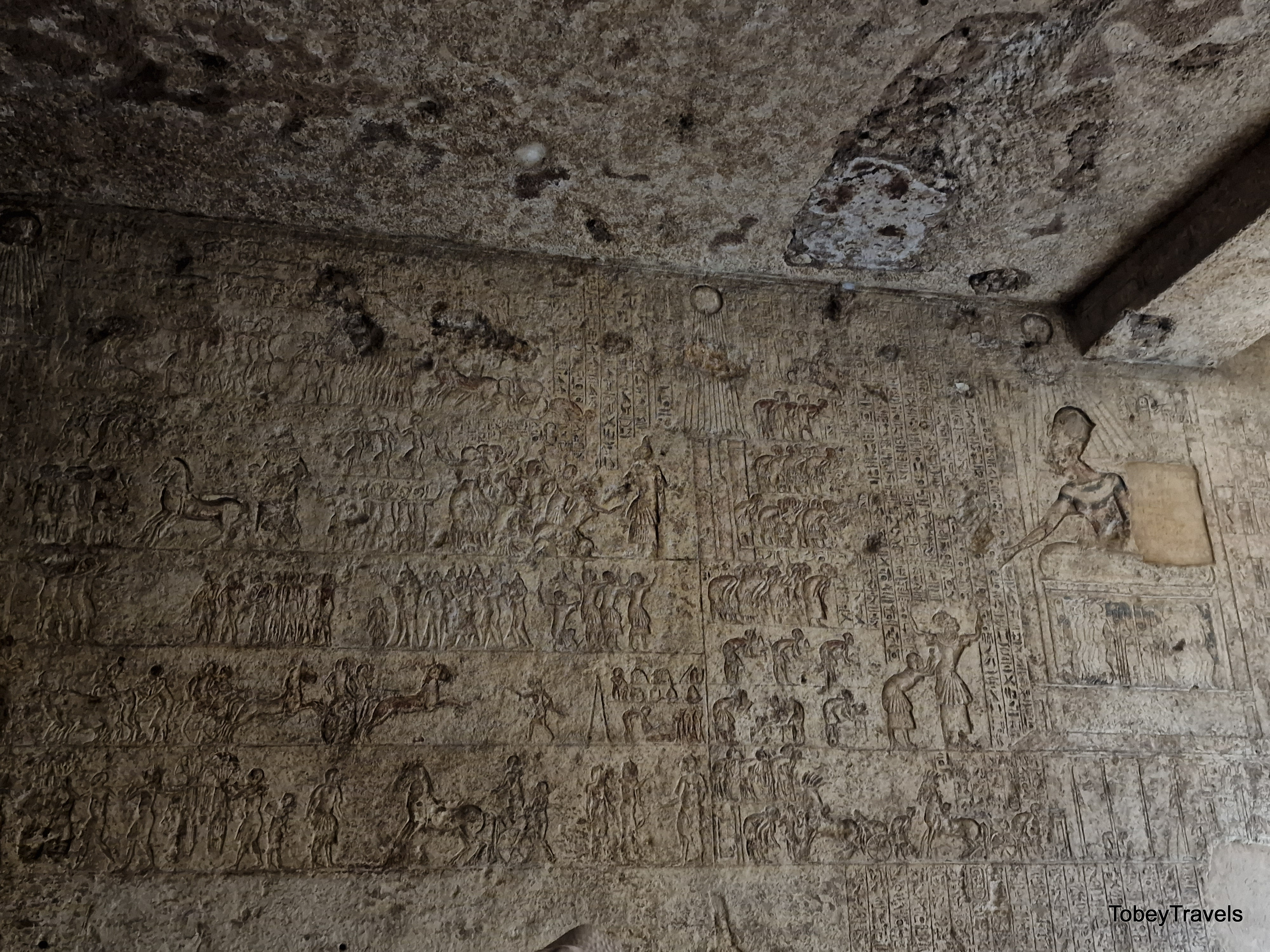
The large hypostyle hall of Amarna Tomb 8 featuring Akhenaten and Mahu at a Window of Appearances scene.

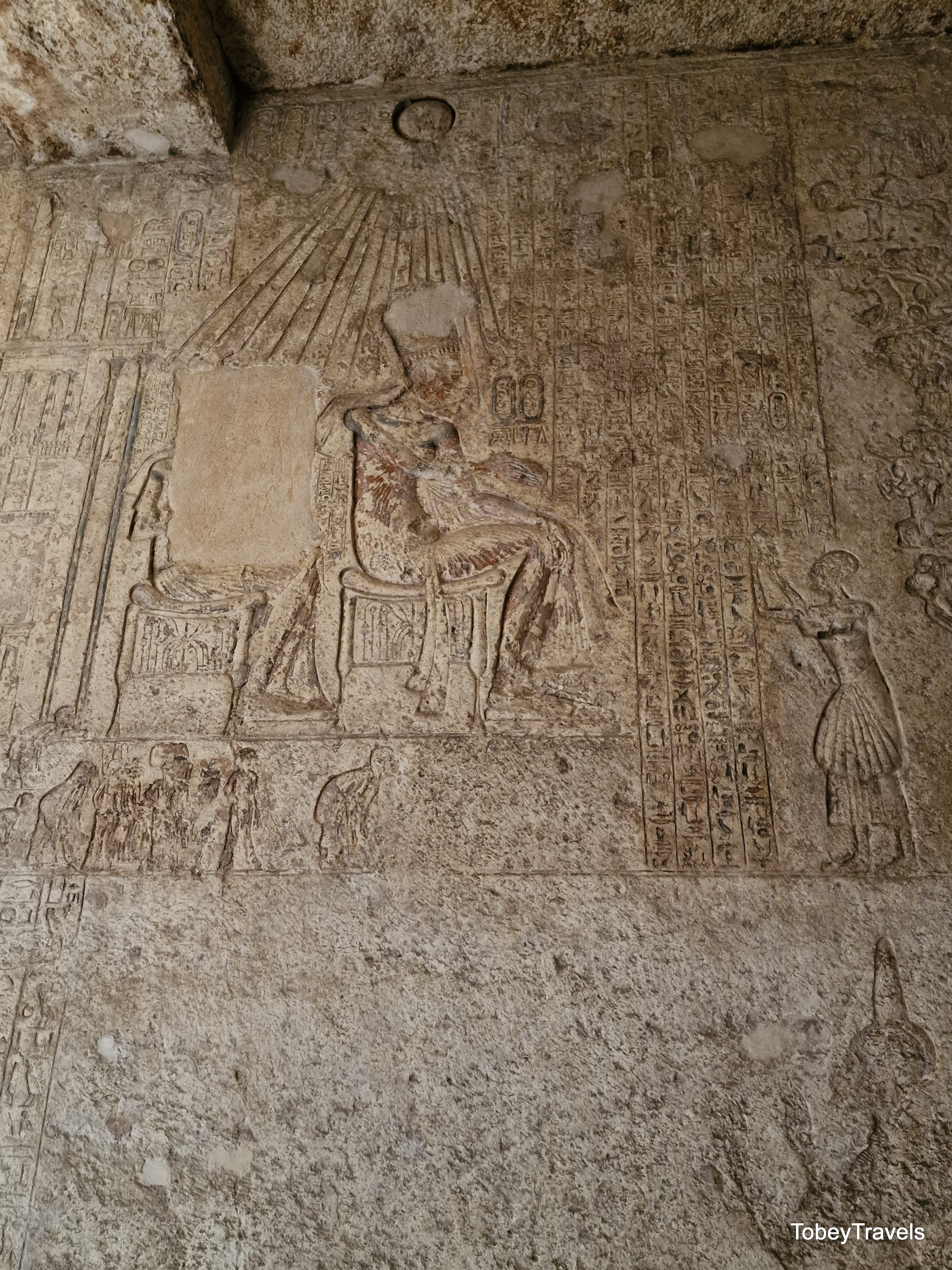
Akhenaten prepares to reward Mahu (right) in the afterlife.

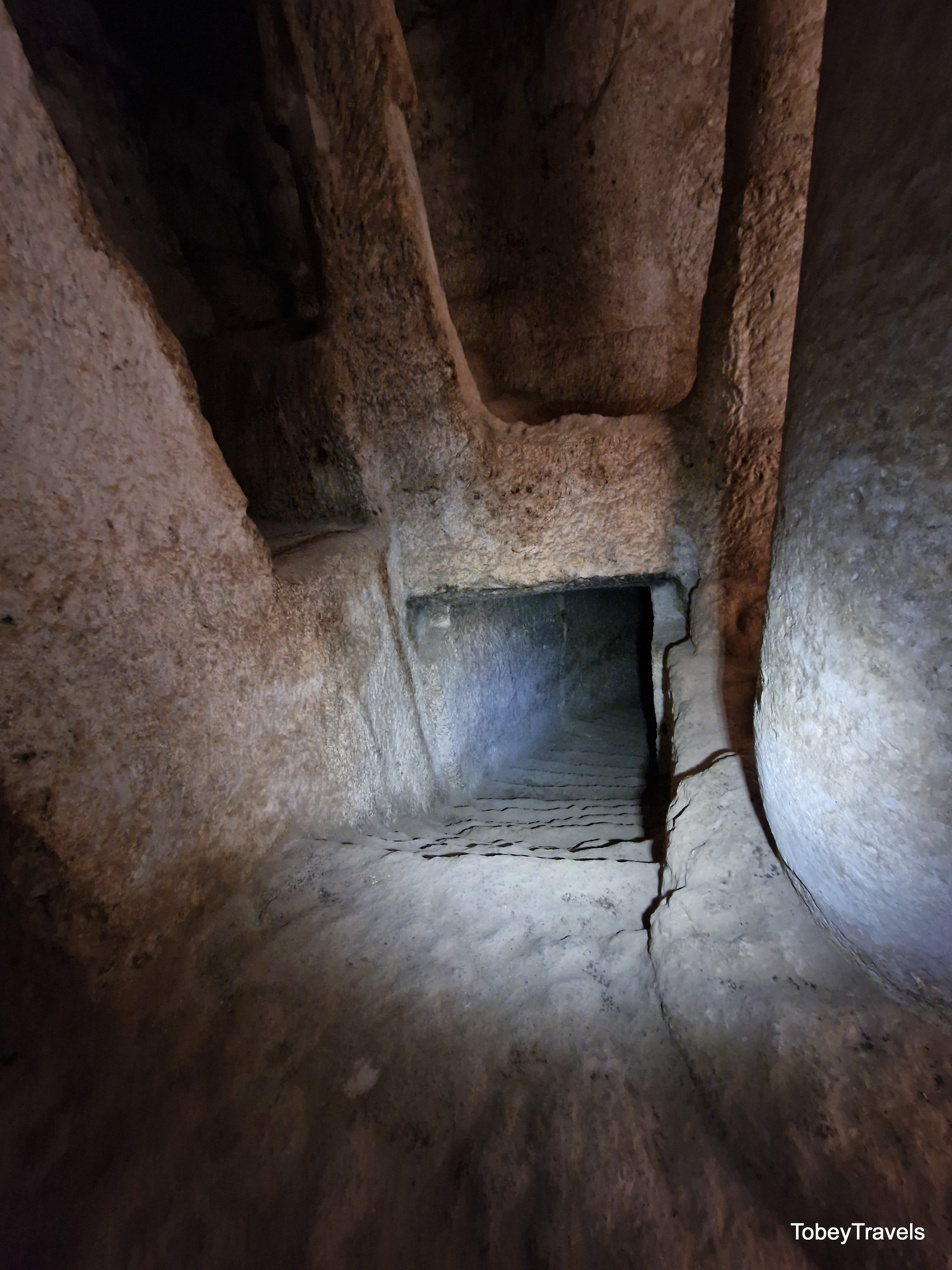
The uncut burial chamber of Mahu in Amarna Tomb 8.

The architectural plan of TA8 presents a short corridor that, starting from the external façade, leads into a transversal colonnaded room (6 columns and 6 pilasters of columns) in which some lateral rooms open (some unfinished). In the centre of the eastern wall, there is a corridor perpendicular to the previous room, while in the eastern corner of the transversal room, a staircase leads to the underground apartment. Tomb TA8 has a façade that recalls the entrance of a mastaba; the low height of the cliff in which the tomb is dug was compensated by digging the pavement to a level lower than the surrounding walking surface. The façade has, on the sides of the entrance, the peculiarity of having (nos. 1 and 2 in the plan) twelve columns of text (7 on the left and 5 on the right) which are heavily damaged; three princesses with sistrums, wet nurses, flabellum bearers and scribes are also represented here, accompanying King Akhenaten and Queen Nefertiti and, perhaps, the latter's sister Mutnodjemet. A series of hieroglyphics converge towards the centre of the entrance from which a corridor, on whose walls (3–4) the royal family is represented in adoration of the Aten and the deceased on his knees, leads into a colonnaded room with six columns and a wall, parallel to the series of columns, from which an equal number of pilasters of columns protrude. On the walls: in the upper part (5–7) the deceased in the presence of the images of the king and queen (destroyed) seated in front of an entrance to the Royal Palace, in the presence of officials and courtiers. In the lower part (6–7) the deceased and some people praying; followed (8) by the representation of the deceased, officials and servants, outside the Palace. Likewise on another wall (9–11), in the upper part the deceased is awarded by the king and queen who look out from a balcony in the presence of strangers, officials, servants, while below some chariots are shown waiting. Followed, in the lower part (10–11), the deceased and some people praying; a little further on (12–13) in the upper part the deceased is escorted home by some friends. On the architraves of two lateral rooms (14–15) the deceased is shown kneeling in adoration of the cartouche of Aten On one of the columns (16) and on the corresponding architrave (17) scenes of the royal family in adoration of Aten and of the deceased on his knees appear.

== Bibliography ==
- Flinders Petrie (1892). David Nutt (ed.). Medum. London.
- Karl Richard Lepsius (1849–1859). Denkmäler aus Aegypten und Aethiopien, in 12 voll (in German).
- Gardiner, Alan; Weigall, Arthur E.P. (1913). Bernard Quaritch (ed.). Topographical Catalogue of the Private Tombs of Thebes. London.
- N. de Garis Davies (1903). The Rock Tombs of Amarna. London: Offices of the Egypt Exploration Fund.
- Seton Lloyd (1933). Model of a Tell el-'Amarnah House, in The Journal of Egyptian Archaeology, Vol. XIX, pp. 1-7. Sage Publications Ltd.
- Reeves, Nicholas (2019) [2001]. Akhenaten: Egypt's False Prophet (Electronic ed.). London; New York: Thames & Hudson. ISBN 978-0-500-29469-7. LCCN 00108868.
- Porter, Bertha; Moss, Rosalind L.B. (1968). Topographical Bibliography of Ancient Egyptian hieroglyphic texts, reliefs, and paintings. Vol. IV Lower and Middle Egypt. Oxford: Oxford at the Clarendon Press.
- Anna K. Hodgkinson (2018). Technology and Urbanism in Late Bronze Age Egypt. Oxford: Oxford University Press. ISBN 978-0-19-880359-1.
- Frederic Louis Norden (1755). Voyage d'Egypte et de Nubie (in French). Copenhagen: Imprimerie de la Maison Royale des Orphelines.
- Marc Gabolde (2009). La redécouverte de la nécropole royale de Tell el-Amarna, in Égypte Afrique & Orient: La redécouverte d'Amarna, n. 52 (in French).
- Aidan Dodson & Dyan Hilton (2004). The complete Royal families of Ancient Egypt. London: Thames & Hudson.
- Franco Cimmino (2003). Dizionario delle Dinastie faraoniche (in Italian). Bompiani. ISBN 9-788845-255311.
- Leonore O. Congdon (2000). A rare solar display depicted in the tomb of Meryre I at El Amarna, in Amarna Letters: Essays on Ancient Egypt ca. 1390-1310 B.C.
