= Mutnedjmet (disambiguation) =

Mutnedjmet was the wife of Pharaoh Horemheb from the Eighteenth Dynasty of ancient Egypt.

Mutnedjemet may also refer to:

- Mutnedjmet (21st dynasty), wife of Psusennes I and mother of Pharaoh Amenemope
- Mutbenret or Mutnodjemet, sister of Queen Nefertiti
