= Neferkheperu-her-sekheper =

Ancient Egyptian official

Coordinates: 27.6617°N 30.9056°E

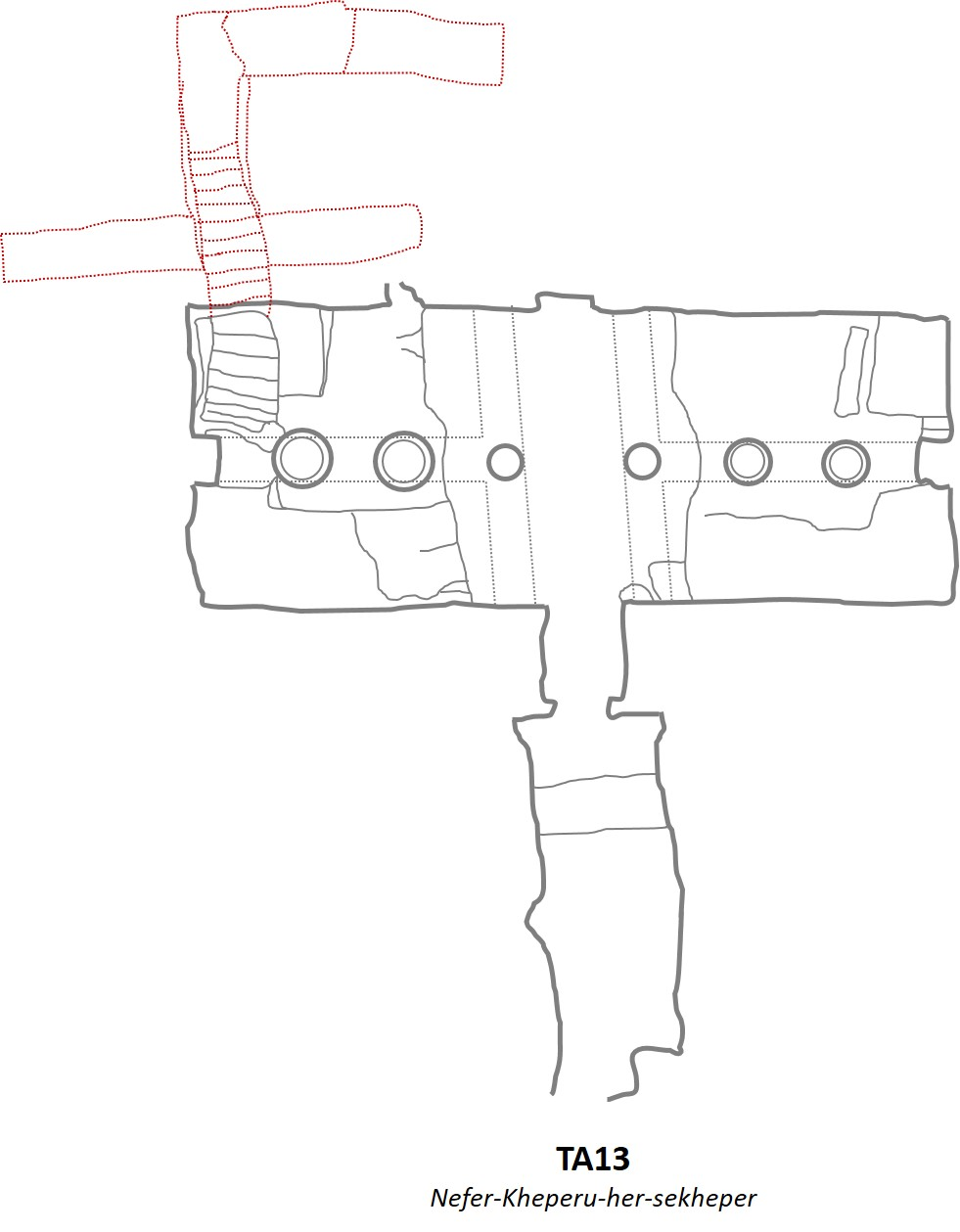
TA13 NeferKheperu.

nfr xpr Z2 Hr Z1 z xpr r
Neferkheperu-her-sekheper
in hieroglyphs
Era: New Kingdom
(1550–1069 BC)

Neferkheperu-her-sekheper was an ancient Egyptian official during the reign of Pharaoh Akhenaten. He was the mayor of Akhet-Aten, the pharaoh's new capital. He was buried in Tomb EA13 in the southern group of the Amarna rock tombs. His name, "Neferkheperu causes me to live", is a basilophoric name (one that contains the name of a king, usually to glorify him), since "Neferkheperu" is an element of Akhenaten's throne name.

== Tomb ==
Neferkheperu-her-sekheper's tomb was officially opened by Bouriant in 1883 and excavated by Daressy in 1893, but it had been entered before, as inscriptions on the ceiling included modern-era names and dates.

The tomb is unfinished and in a good state. Its layout is similar to that of other Amarna tombs. It consists of one room, with six white columns in one row perpendicular to the entry; the distance between the two middle ones is slightly more than between the others. Work has been started on the back wall of the room, there would have been another room or possibly a shrine there. Decoration below the ceiling is complete, only the colours and the inscriptions are missing. Decoration lower on the wall is completely missing; on the south side even the columns haven't been carved completely. By the time the burial took place it must have been evident that the tomb wouldn't be finished; after finishing the room and most of the columns the workers began to work in the northeastern corner, the usual place of the stairs leading to the burial chamber. The chamber itself was just large enough to contain the sarcophagus. Two corridors leading from it are either contemporary or were carved later.
