= TT188 =

Theban tomb

Theban tomb TT188
- Burial site of Parennefer
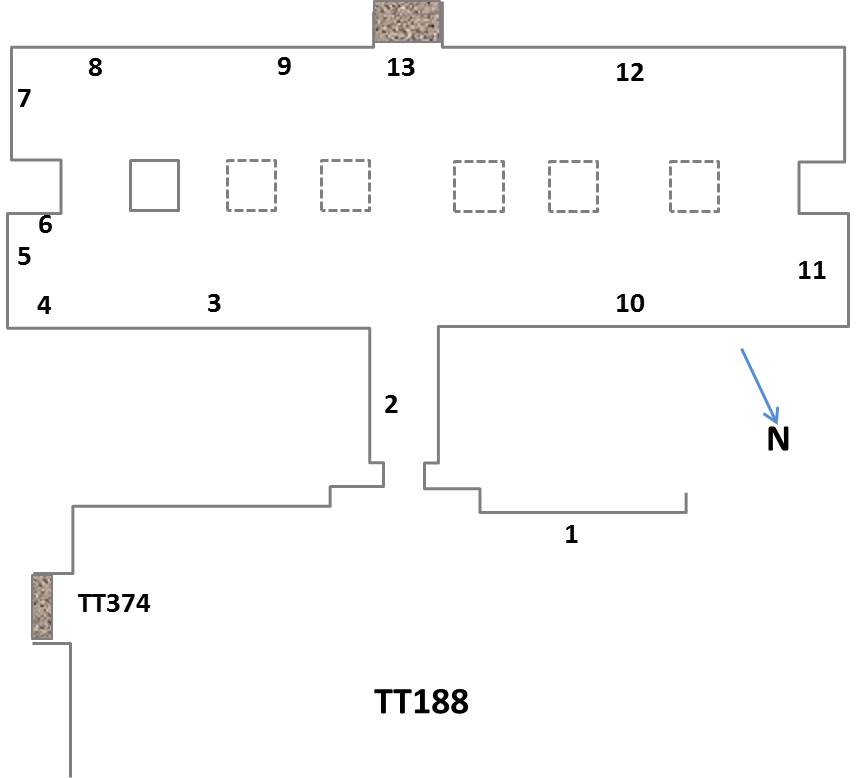

- Location within Egypt
- Location: El-Assasif, Theban Necropolis
- ← Previous; TT187 Next → TT189

Tomb TT188, located in the necropolis of El-Assasif in Thebes in Egypt, is the tomb of the Steward and King's Cupbearer Parennefer. It has been excavated by the Akhenaten Temple Project. The work has been thoroughly published by Susan Redford with architectural study and drawings by Keith Meikle.

It is one of the few tombs in the Theban Necropolis that was carved and decorated solely during the early years of the rule of Akhenaten. The tomb is decorated with sculpted scenes, some of which were painted. The scenes were all badly damaged and the name of Parennefer was carefully removed. The decoration includes harvest scenes, the presentation of temple-staves at the inauguration of Akhenaten, and an award scene showing Parennefer before the royal couple. In the tomb Akhenaten goes by his initial name Amenhotep (IV).

The scenes in the tomb of Parennefer may be the first to show Queen Nefertiti. An unnamed royal woman accompanies Akhenaten as he worships the Aten and sits besides the king in a scene showing Parennefer before his king and queen. The queen is thought to be Nefertiti. The scenes show some of the earliest examples of Amarna style depictions. The figures show the rounded form that will become typical in Amarna art, and courtiers are shown bending from the waist with their arms hanging down.

Parennefer was never buried in the tomb as he later built a tomb (no 7) constructed at Amarna.

Mummies, coffins and other remains show that the tomb was later reused during the 21st and 22nd dynasties, and robber tunnels have led the way to new and unrecorded tombs, whose entrances cannot be located from outside.

== Recent discoveries ==
By tracing the multiple robber tunnels that enter the tomb, other previously unknown tombs have been located close by. These include a small painted tomb from the Ramesside period, one from the 18th Dynasty, and a tomb of the 25th Dynasty. This last tomb entrance way is constructed of mud-brick, has a large open court, and a long corridor with a series of chambers and deep shafts excavated in the bedrock.

== Other tomb ==
Parennefer also had a tomb (no 7) constructed at Amarna.

== See also ==
- List of Theban tombs
