= Tomb of Panehsy =

Ancient Egyptian tomb

Tomb of Panehesy
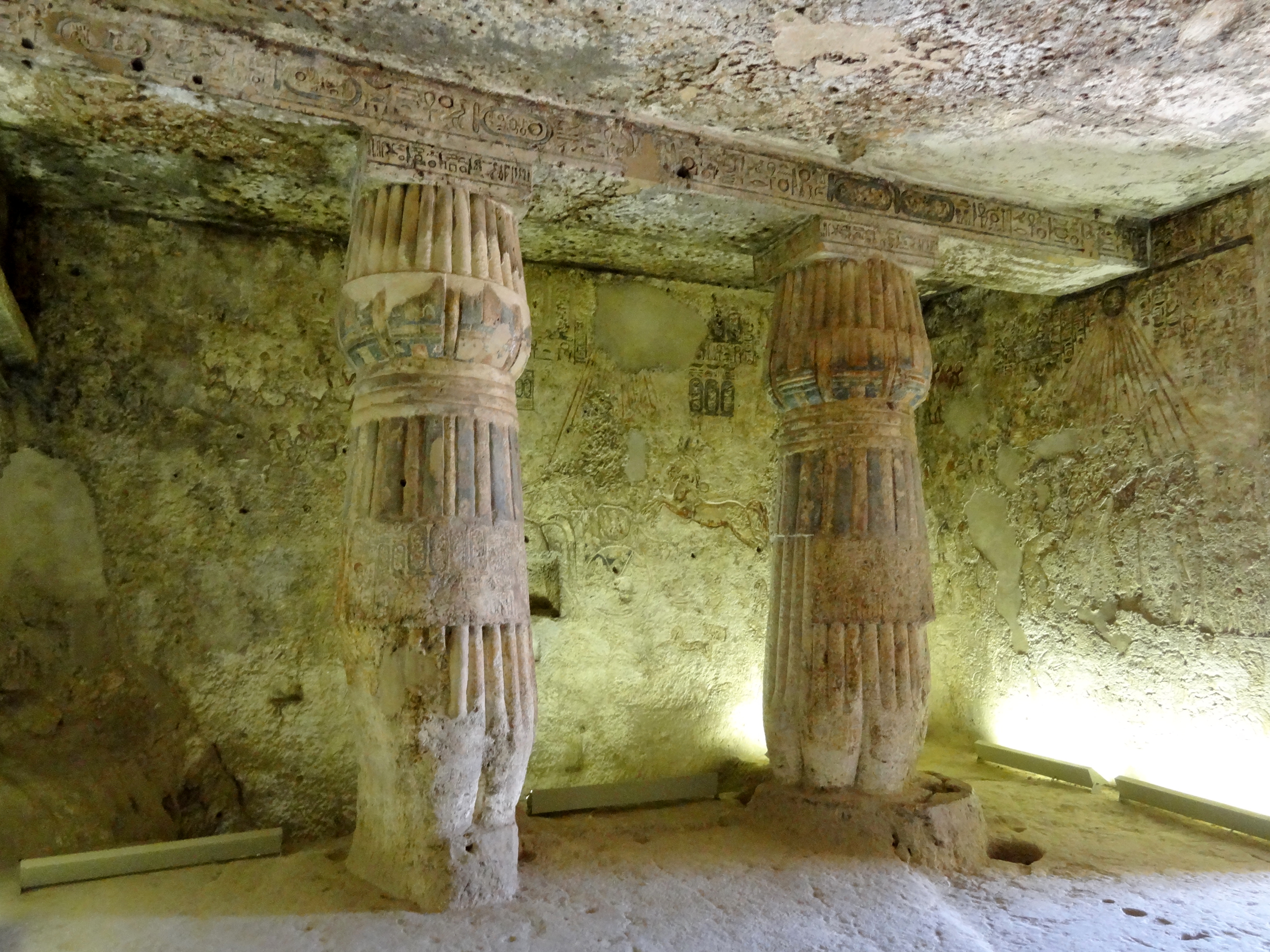
- Type: Tomb
- Location: Minya, Egypt

History
- Built: c. 1350 BC

The Tomb of Panehesy (also Panhesy) is a tomb in Amarna, Egypt. It was erected for the noble Panehesy who bore the titles the First servant of the Aten in the house of Aten in Akhet-Aten, Second prophet of the Lord of the Two Lands Neferkheprure-Waenre (Akhenaten), the sealbearer of the King of Lower Egypt, Overseer of the storehouse of the Aten in Akhetaten, Overseer of cattle of the Aten in Akhet-Aten.

== General description ==
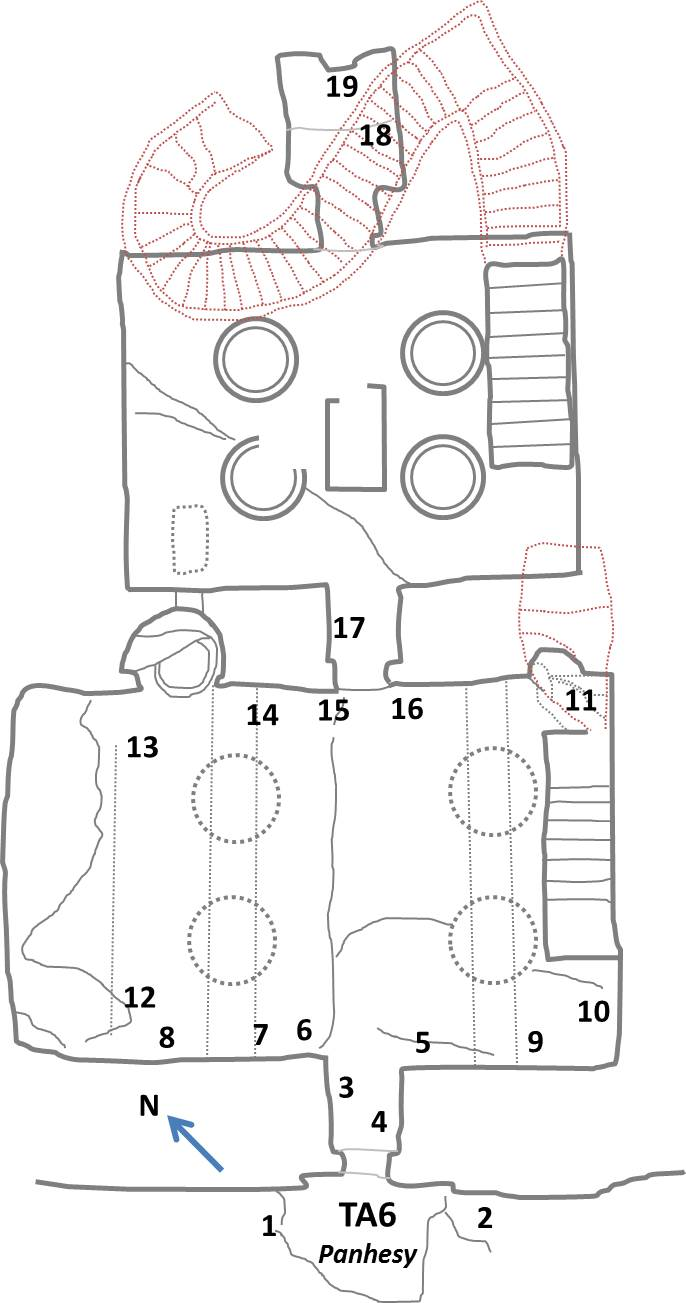
Plan of the tomb of Panhesy

The tomb of Panehesy is part of the Northern tombs. These tombs are generally larger than the tombs referred to as the Southern tombs. Panehesy's tomb, like the one belonging to Meryre, is known for the depictions of the temple of the Aten. The Tomb of Panehesy contains scenes of himself and his family and others showing the royal family, but his remains have never been identified. The tomb had suffered damage from iconoclasts. The images of Amenhotep IV and Nefertiti had been disfigured, and most of the names had been removed.

In later times, his tomb was turned into a Coptic place of worship for a while and suffered damage. A deep font for total immersion was placed before the apse.

== Tomb decoration ==
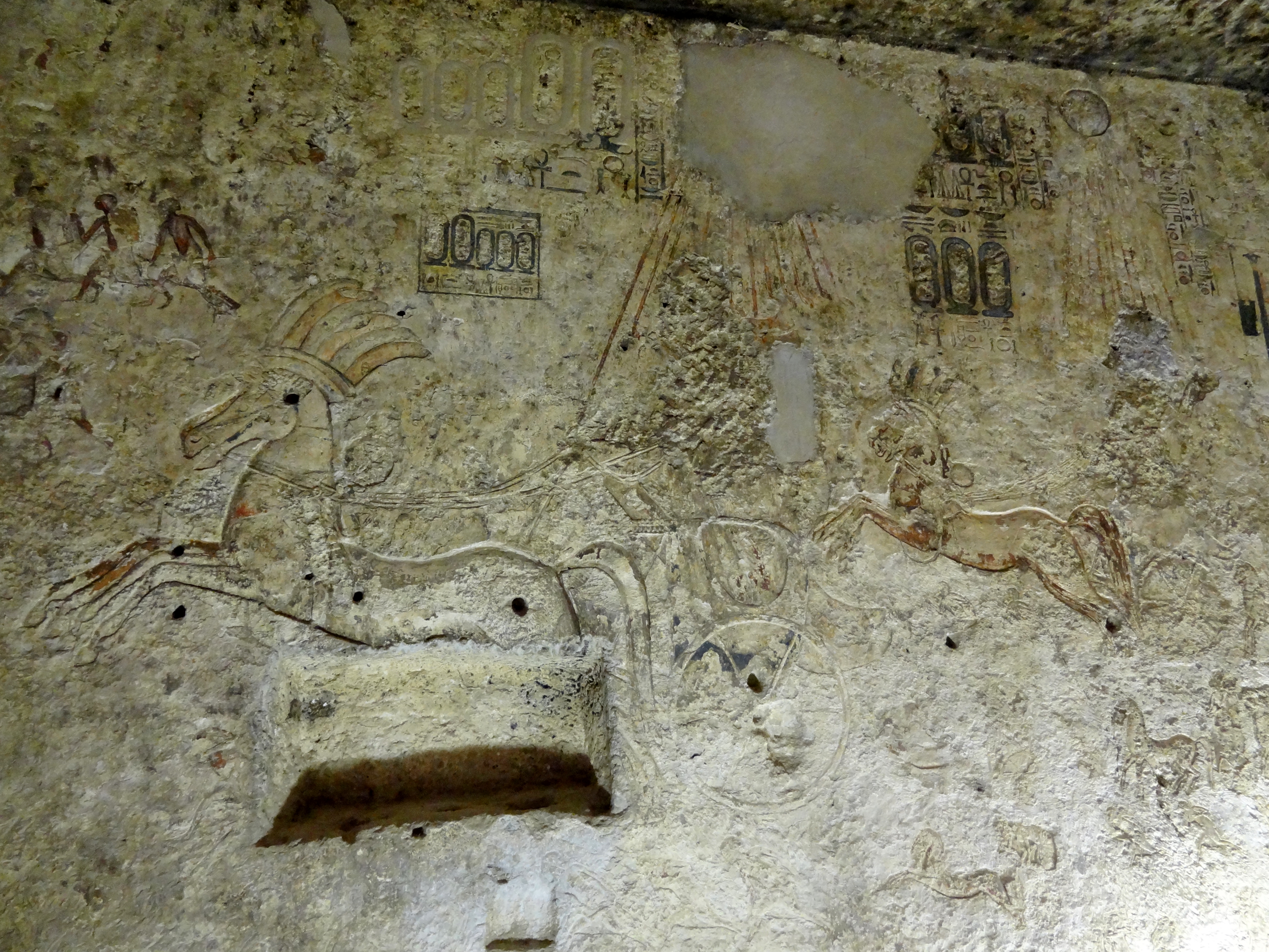
Defaced scenes of Amenhotep IV and Nefertiti in Panehesy's tomb

=== Ceiling ===
On one of the ceilings Panehesy mentions receiving gold from the king for doing a great thing for his lady, the king's daughter.

=== Jambs outer door ===
The upper panel shows the King with the crown of the North on the left and the crown of the south on the right. On the left, Amenhotep IV is followed by Nefertiti wearing a Khat headdress. Both seem to be offering loaves (?). On the right, Nefertiti wears her flat-topped blue crown. In these scenes only Meritaten seems to accompany her parents. Below these scenes we see Akhenaten wearing the Khepresh crown and Nefertiti wearing her blue crown again apparently offering food from the offering table.

=== Lintel outer door ===
Below that we have a double scene showing Akhenaten and Nefertiti with their three eldest daughters before an altar. On the left Akhenaten and Nefertiti are both shown burning incense. Nefertiti wears her flat topped blue crown while Akhenaten is shown wearing his khepresh crown. On the right hand side of the scene Akhenaten still wears the same crown, but Neefertiti is now shown wearing a close fitting cap. The king and queen are shown pouring something from a vase. The three princesses are shown shaking sistra. The presence of two dwarfs points to the presence of Nefertiti's sister Mutbenret (Mutnedjmet), who is probably depicted in the register above and to the side of the princesses.

=== Thickness of outer wall ===
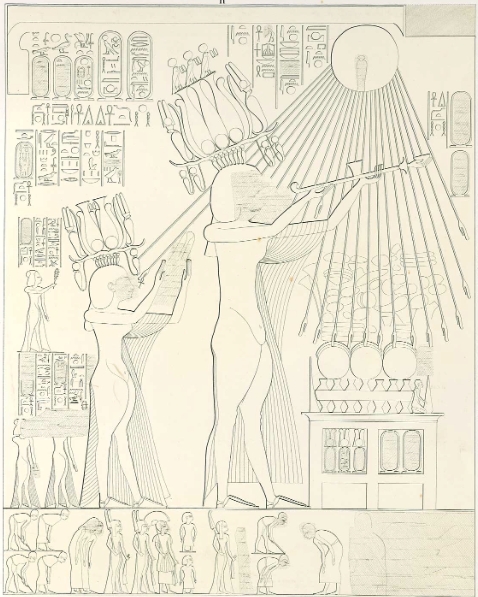
Akhenaten and Nefertiti offering to the Aten. From the tomb of Panehesy in Amarna. from Lepsius Denkmahler.

On the right hand side Akhenaten and Nefertiti raise Sekhem scepters, giving homage to the sun. They are accompanied by Meritaten, Meketaten and Ankhesenpaaten, shaking a sistrum. The king wears the Khepresh crown. Nefertiti's image is too heavily damaged to determine her headdress. The Queen's figure is accompanied by rather elaborate titulary:

The heiress, great of favor, mistress of the district of the South and the North, fair of face and gay with the two feathers, soothing the heart of the King at home (?), pleased at all that is said, the great and beloved wife of the King, Lady of the Two Lands (Nefertiti).

On the right hand side, we see the King burning spices in a hawk headed censing-spoon, while the queen presents a bouquet of lotus flowers. Both wear an elaborate Atef-crown. Akhenaten wears a triple Atef crown flanked by uraei and topped with falcons wearing a sundisk and accompanying a double cartouche. Nefertiti wears a double Atef-crown flanked by two uraei. This crown is worn on a uraeus shaped modius and on top of what looks like a khat headdress. In the register below this scene we see the Queen's sister Mutbenret (Mutnedjmet) accompanied by her two dwarves, two male attendants and four female attendants.

=== South wall, west Side: Panehesy rewarded ===
Panehesy appears before the window of appearance. Meritaten appears in the window with Akhenaten and Nefertiti. Nefertiti is shown with her arm around her daughter. Meketaten and Ankhesenpaaten are shown embracing each other in the hall behind the window of appearance. Neferneferuaten Tasherit is shown clasping Ankhesenpaaten's arm. The princesses are accompanied by two nurses.

=== South wall, east side: Royal family offering to the Aten ===
Akhenaten and Nefertiti are shown offering flowers to the Aten. Akhenaten is depicted with the red crown of the North while Nefertiti seems to be wearing a short Nubian style wig (?). Meritaten, Meketaten, Ankhesenpaaten and Neferneferuaten-tasherit are shown behind their parents. It is not clear what the older princesses are offering, but Ankhesenpaaten and Neferneferuaten-tasherit are shown carrying bouquets of flowers just like their parents.

=== East wall: royal family driving out ===
Akhenaten and Nefertiti are each shown driving their own chariot. Both seem to be wearing a blue crown. Nefertiti is shown with a whip held in her left hand. There are two chariots carrying two princesses each. Most likely Meritaten, Meketaten, Ankhesenpaaten and Neferneferuaten-tasherit. There are also three chariots carrying six female attendants.

=== West wall: royal family at the temple ===
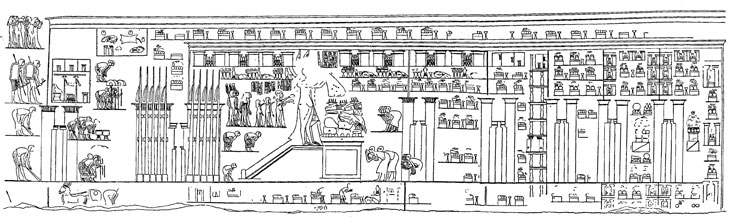
Royal visit to the temple of the Aten. West wall of the tomb of Panehesy.

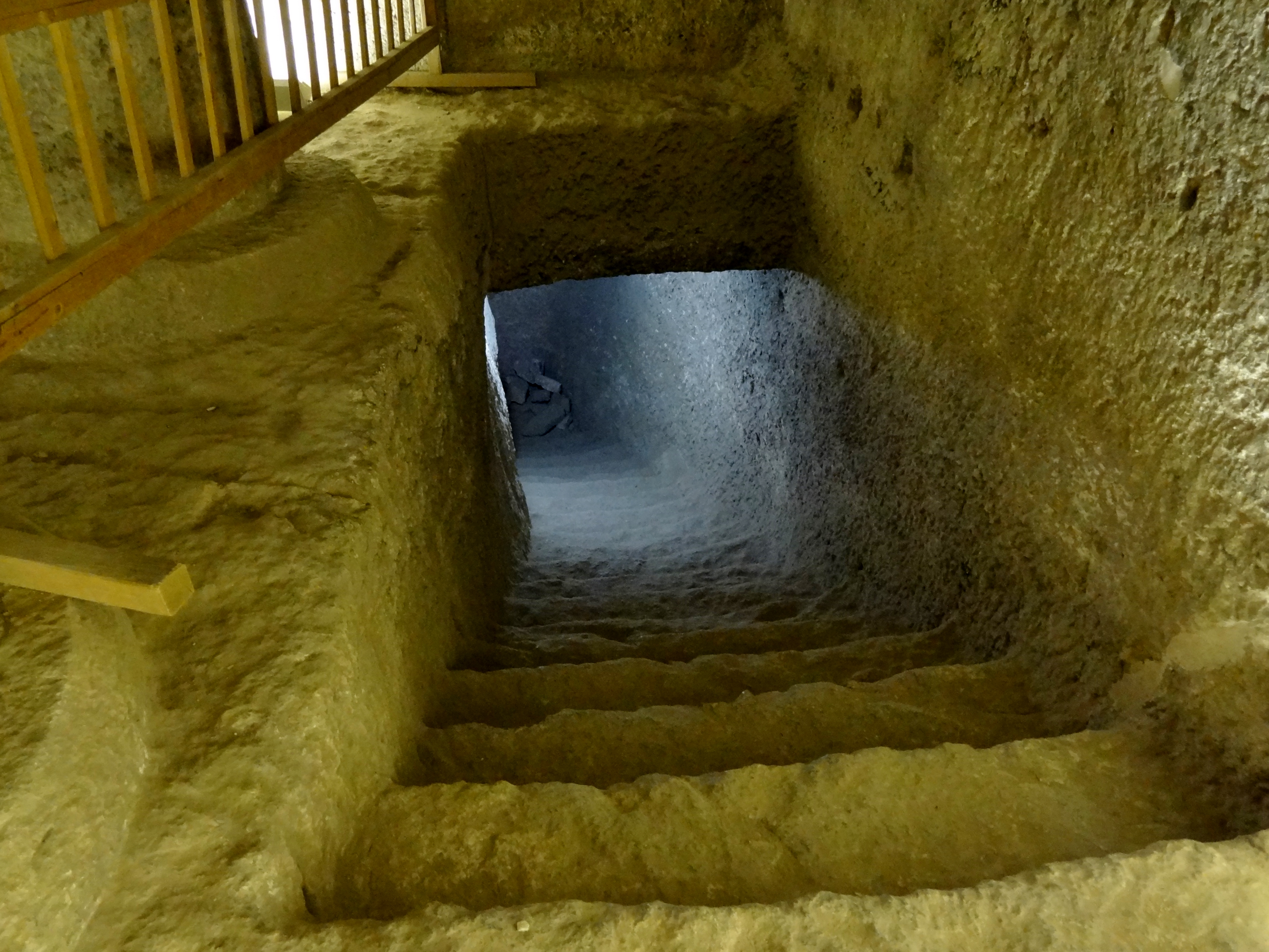
Stairs to down to a second Burial Chamber of the Tomb of Panehesy

Akhenaten and Nefertiti are shown side by side on a raised platform before an altar. Nefertiti is shown to the left of Akhenaten and is only indicated by an outline. They seem to be pouring something onto the altar. Meritaten is shown offering loaves, while Meketaten and Ankhesenpaaten shake a sitrum. The princesses are accompanied by two nurses and three attendants.

=== North wall: The king and queen worshipping ===
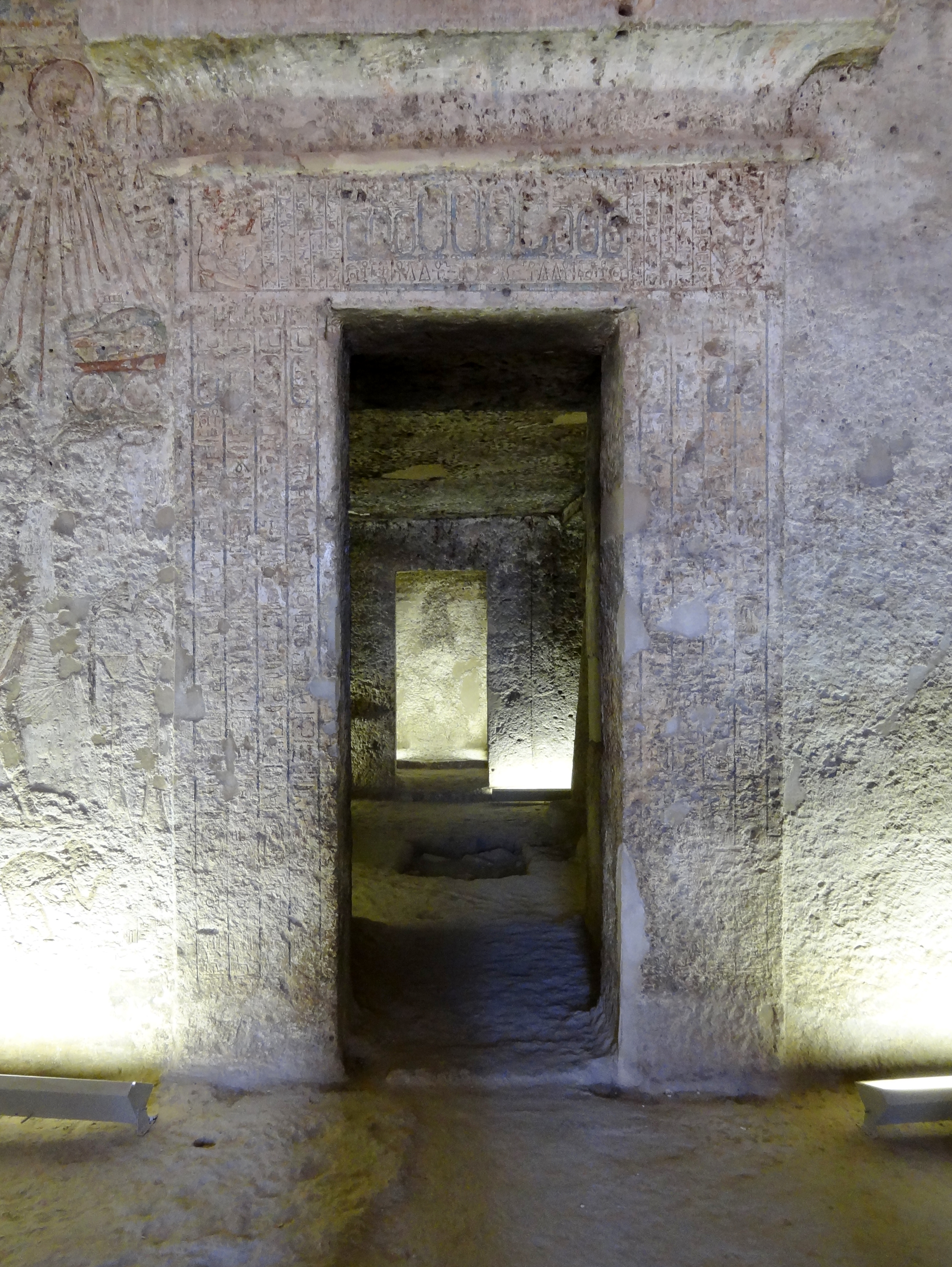
A corridor in Panehesy's tomb

This scene was much damaged during the Coptic period. Akhenaten is shown holding up a plate with food offerings. Nefertiti stands behind him either holding up her hands or possibly offering up flowers or food which can no longer be seen.
