= Nakhtpaaten =

Ancient Egyptian vizier

Nakhtpaaten (Nakht)
- Vizier of the South
Egyptian name
n xt t D40 pA i t n ra
- Predecessor: Ramose
- Successor: Usermontu?
- Dynasty: 18th Dynasty
- Pharaoh: Akhenaten
- Burial: Tomb no.12 in Amarna

Nakhtpaaten (“Strong is the Aten”) or Nakht was an ancient Egyptian vizier during the reign of Pharaoh Akhenaten of the 18th Dynasty.

== Biography ==
Nakhtpaaten seems to have succeeded the Vizier Ramose in office. Ramose was the vizier in Thebes possibly up to the time of the move to Amarna, Akhenaten's new capital. His titles as given in his house and tomb were: Hereditary prince, count, sealbearer, overseer of the city and vizier, overseer of the work projects in Akhet-Aten.

It is likely Nakhtpaaten who is depicted in the tomb of Mahu who served as the Chief of Police. Mahu is shown meeting with a vizier and a lesser official named Heqanefer in a scene related to policing the city. Mahu leads three individuals before the vizier, two of whom are bearded. These men appear to have been accused of trespassing in the desert area surrounding Amarna.

== Residence ==
Nakhtpaaten lived in the southern part of the city of Akhetaten, and his house has been found. It was located to the far southern parts of the city and quite far removed from the palace. Nakht must have traveled daily to the central part of the city to fulfill his office.

Nakhtpaaten's house was a large mansion which included reception halls, bedrooms, a bathroom, a lavatory and offices.

The house has been described extensively by, for instance, Leonard Woolley back in 1922. A flight of stairs led to a set of small entry rooms. Beyond the smaller rooms was a large room referred to as a loggia. It is a large, covered space, open on the side. The walls were whitewashed, and colors were used to accent the space. The ceiling in the loggia was painted deep blue.

The central space of the building, a pillared hall, was the main reception area of the house. It measures about 8 meters square. On one side of the room a brick divan stretched almost the entire length of the wall. The ceilings were high and indirect light was filtered into the space.

The reception area opened up into another loggia with large open windows on one side, and it may have been a space used in the winter when the sun would have warmed it. This space was decorated with a scene showing Akhenaten adoring the cartouches of the Aten. Another niche mentions the titles of Nakht and had the Hymn to the Aten inscribed on it.

Adjacent to the main hall, there was an entrance leading to another reception room, which offered a more private atmosphere compared to the larger one previously mentioned. Nearby were the bedrooms of the Vizier and his wife. These bedrooms were accompanied by a bathroom and a lavatory. The bath itself was positioned on a raised platform, with stairs constructed for the servants' convenience in pouring water over the bather.

== Tomb ==
His tomb was Tomb no. 12 of the Amarna rock tombs. Only the facade and the entrance way were completed for this tomb. There are beginnings of three columns in the main hall, but the tomb never proceeded much past this stage.
