= Panehesy =

Nobleman of Ancient Egypt

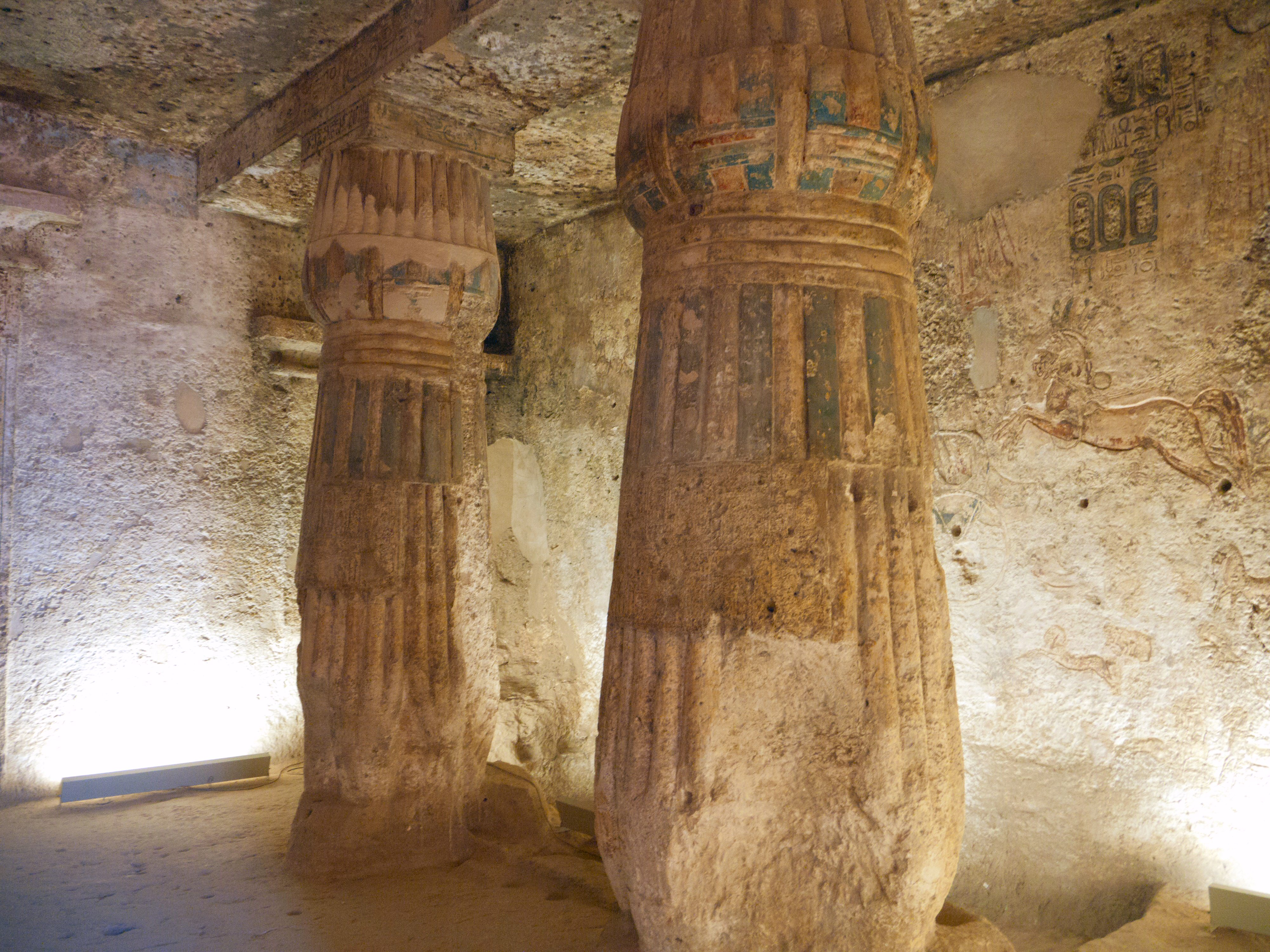
Panehesy's EA6 Amarna tomb

Panehesy (also transcribed as Pinhasy or Panehsy) was an Egyptian noble who bore the titles of 'Chief servitor of the Aten in the temple of Aten in Akhetaten' ('Second Prophet of the Lord of the Two Lands').

== Titles ==
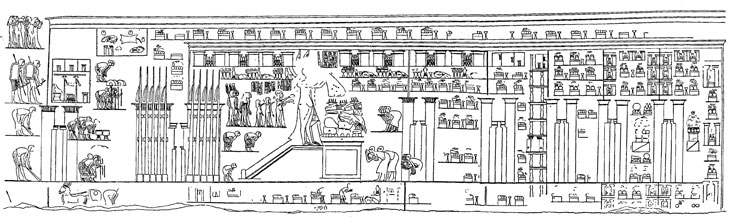
Depiction of the temple of the Aten from Panehesy's tomb

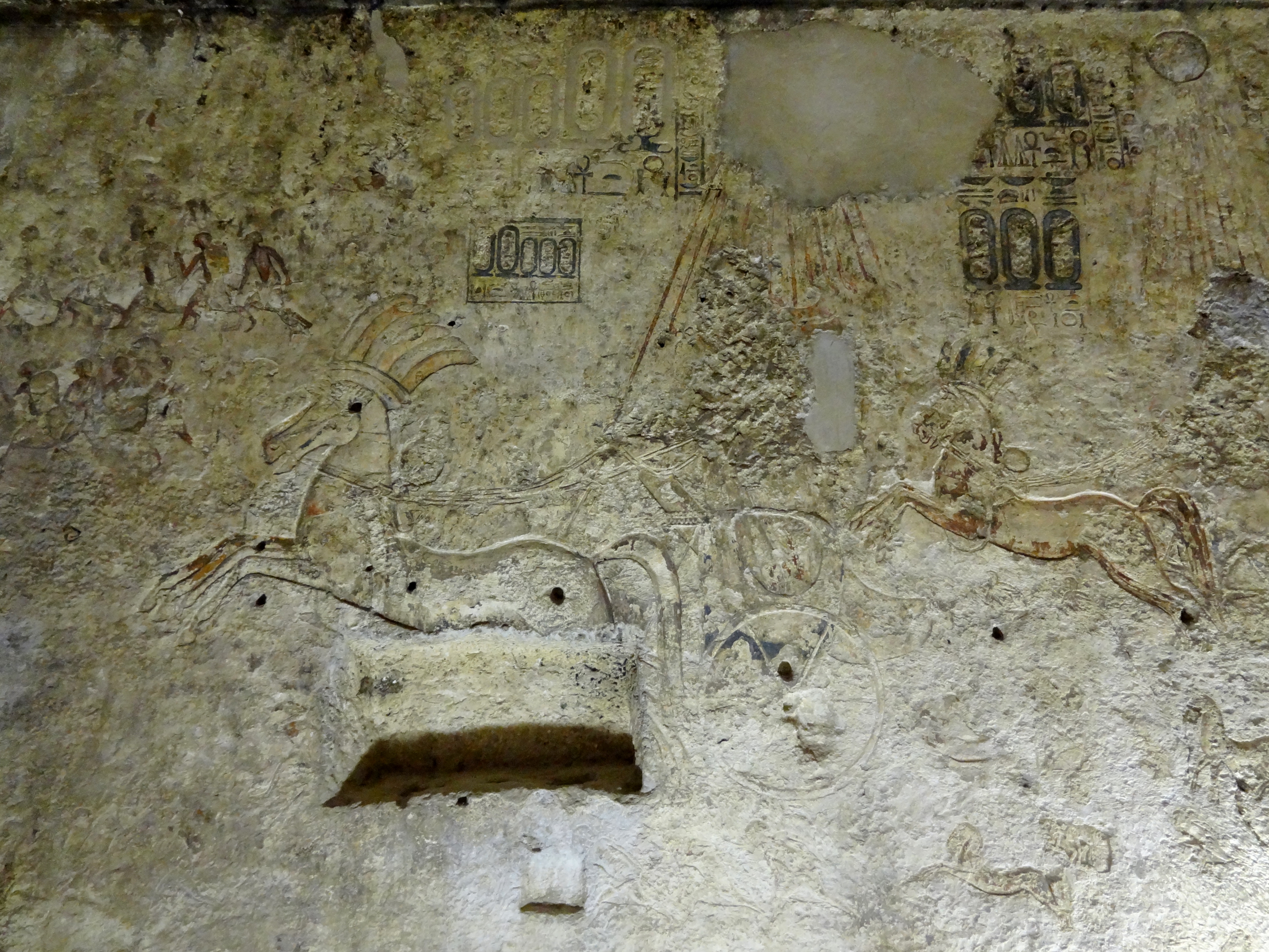
An erased figure of Akhenaten and his family in the Tomb of Panehesy

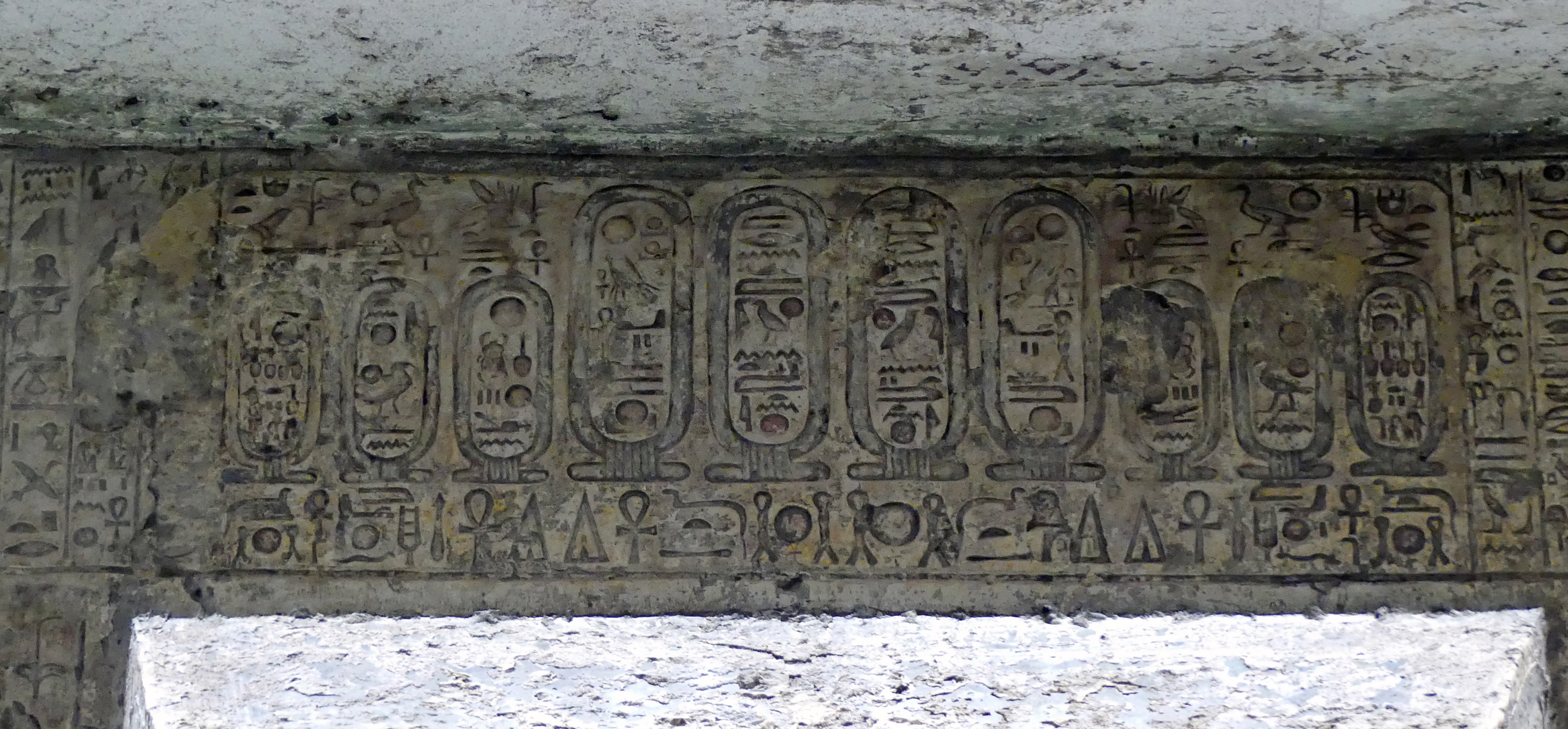
Cartouches of the Aten, Akhenaten and Nefertiti clearly seen above a door lintel in Panehesy's tomb

Panehesy held a variety of titles that show how powerful he must have been during the Amarna Period. He was the 'Chief servitor of the Aten in the temple of Aten in Akhetaten' and 'Second Prophet of the Lord of the Two Lands'. He was also the 'Seal-bearer of Lower Egypt'.

Panehsy was also the Overseer of the Cattle of the Aten in Akhetaten' and the 'Overseer of the Granary of the Aten'.

== Houses ==
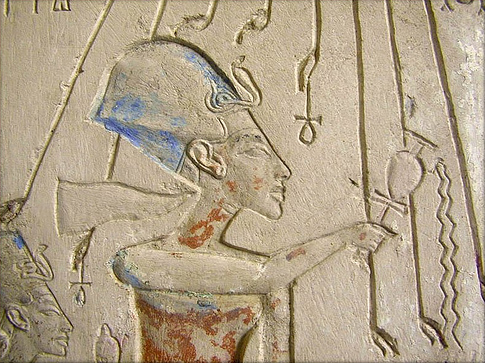
Detail of the stone shrine from the house of Panehesy adjacent to the Aten Temple

Panehesy had two houses in Amarna. One was located near the temple, while another was located in the Central City. The house near the temple was likely more of an office.

The main residence of Panehesy (R44.2) lies in the Central City of Amarna. In his main residence a large shrine was discovered which depicted Akhenaten, Nefertiti, and princess Meritaten making offerings to the Aten. This is an example of the domestic cult of the royal couple. The hypaethral chapel was located within the central hall. To the south of Panehesy's home was a small village. The total area occupied by the village is less than the area occupied by the main residence of the Priest. The village consists of some forty houses that were likely the residences of Panehesy's staff. In the vicinity of the home a stele was discovered depicting Amenhotep III and Queen Tiye.

The second residence of Panehesy near the temple of the Aten may be related to his function as the overseer of the cattle. The structure includes stone floors and brick mangers and may have served as a holding pen for the cattle. Excavations revealed remains of cattle, horn and bones. The bones were the remains of the cattle butchered for the offerings in the temple. The central hall of this house held a stone built shrine painted to look like an Amarna Temple. The structure held narrow wooden doors and likely held a statue of the King. The shrine is now at the Egyptian Museum in Cairo.

== Tomb ==
He had a tomb (TA6) constructed at Amarna, among the northern tombs among the Tombs of the Nobles. The Tomb of Panehsy (Amarna Tomb 6) contains scenes of himself and his family and others showing the royal family, but his remains have never been identified. The tomb had suffered damage from iconoclasts. The images of Akhenaten and Nefertiti had been disfigured, and most of the names had been removed. However, above the inner doorway to the outer hall of Panehesy's tomb, there are some very clear cartouches of the Aten, Akhenaten and Nefertiti, which were not defaced unlike their fate in other Amarna tombs of the nobles.

In later times, his tomb was turned into a Coptic place of worship for a while and suffered more damage. A deep font for total immersion was placed before the apse.
