= Amarna Tomb 7 =

Ancient Egyptian tomb

Coordinates: 27°39′42″N 30°54′20″E

- Burial site of Parennefer
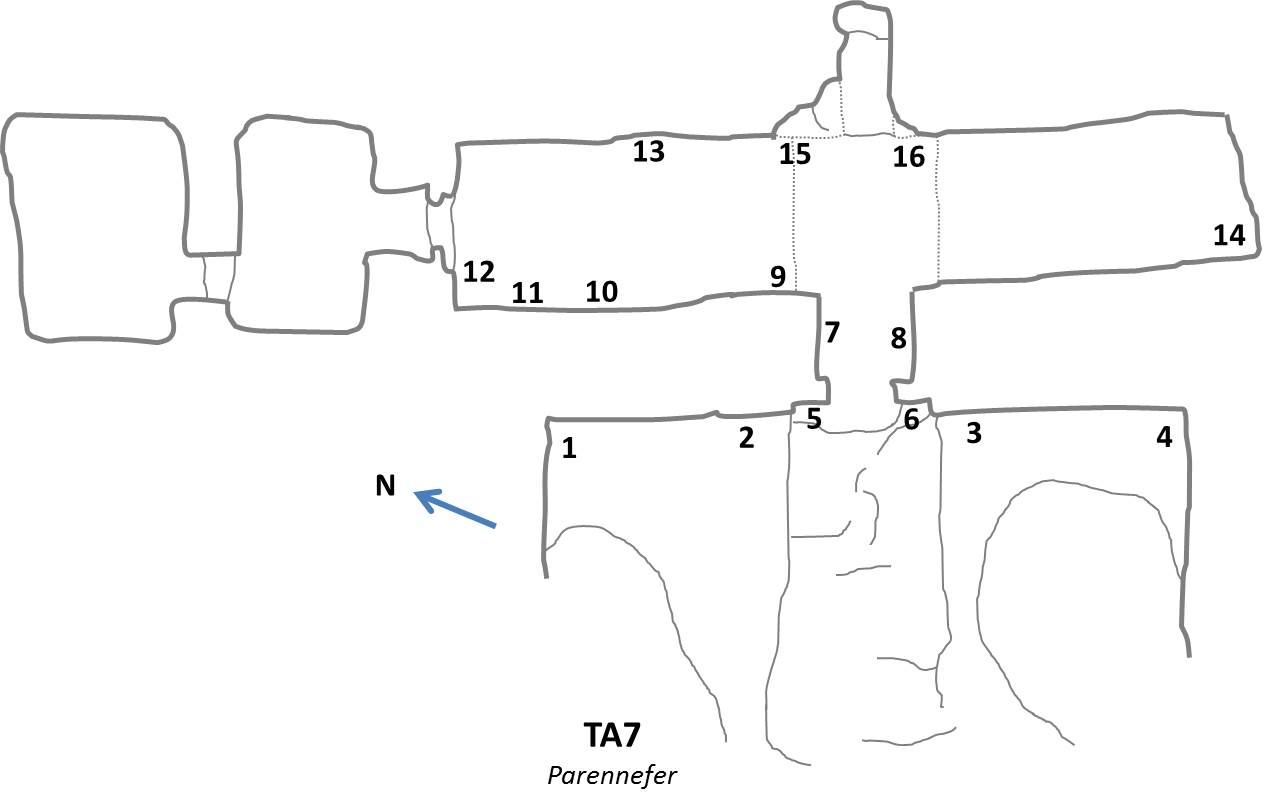
- Plan of the tomb of Parennefer

- Location: Amarna
- ← Previous; Amarna Tomb 6 Next → Amarna Tomb 8

Amarna tomb 7 was one of the Southern tombs at Amarna, Egypt. It belonged to Parennefer, who was a pure handed cupbearer of the king's Person.

The facade of the tomb depicts scenes with Akhenaten, Nefertiti, Meritaten, and Meketaten (and on the left Ankhesenpaaten) offering to the Aten. Near the entrance Akhenaten, Nefertiti and three daughters offer to the deity Aten and in a nearby scene Parennefer offers a prayer.

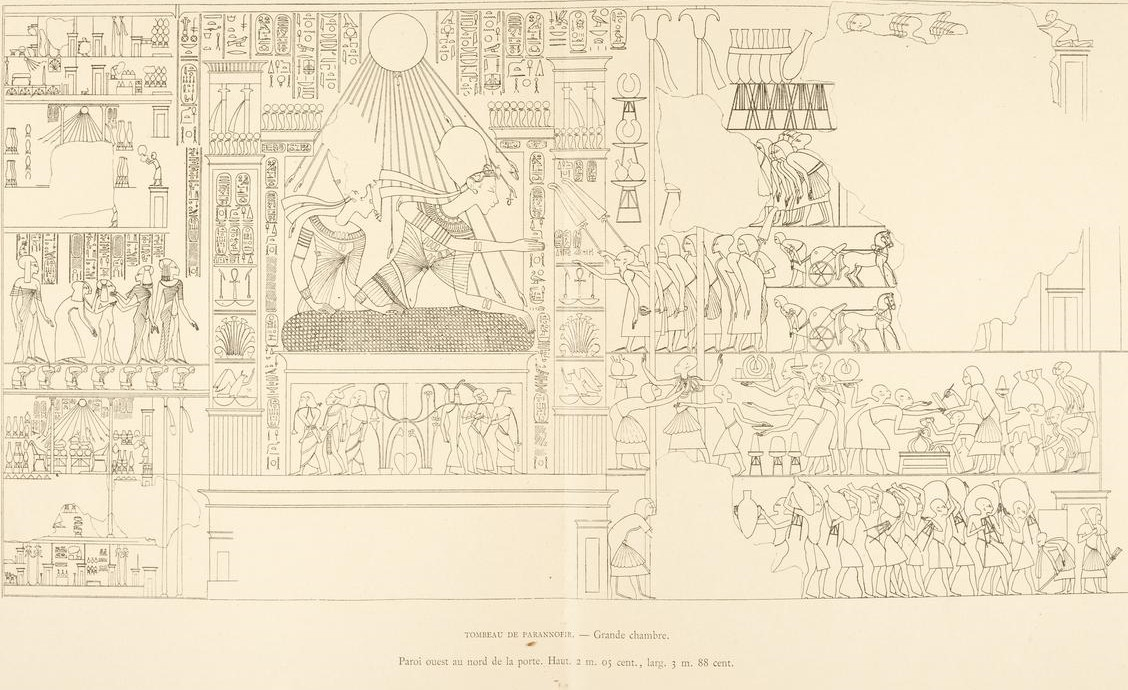
An award scene with Akhenaten and Nefertiti from the tomb of Parennefer

On the West Wall an award scene shows Akhenaten and Nefertiti in the window of Appearances. The princesses Meritaten, Meketaten, Ankhesenpaaten and the Queen's Sister Mutbenret (sometimes referred to as Mutnodjemet or Mutnedjmet) are shown in the palace in a room behind the window. Parennefer is shown receiving many gifts from the royal family, followed by a trip back to his house among celebrating crowds. He is shown being received at the gates of his own house by his wife (whose name was lost), but was said to be a favorite of the King's Chief Wife Neferneferuaten-Nefertiti.

The East Wall contains a scene where the King gives an audience to Parennefer. Akhenaten, Nefertiti and one of their daughter are shown in a kiosk, while Parennefer and a servant appear before the royal family. The servant offers ointment, while Parennefer offers a speech. Several courtiers and musicians are shown attending with several tables with food and drink presented in the scene.
