= Southern Tomb 11 =

Ancient Egyptian tomb

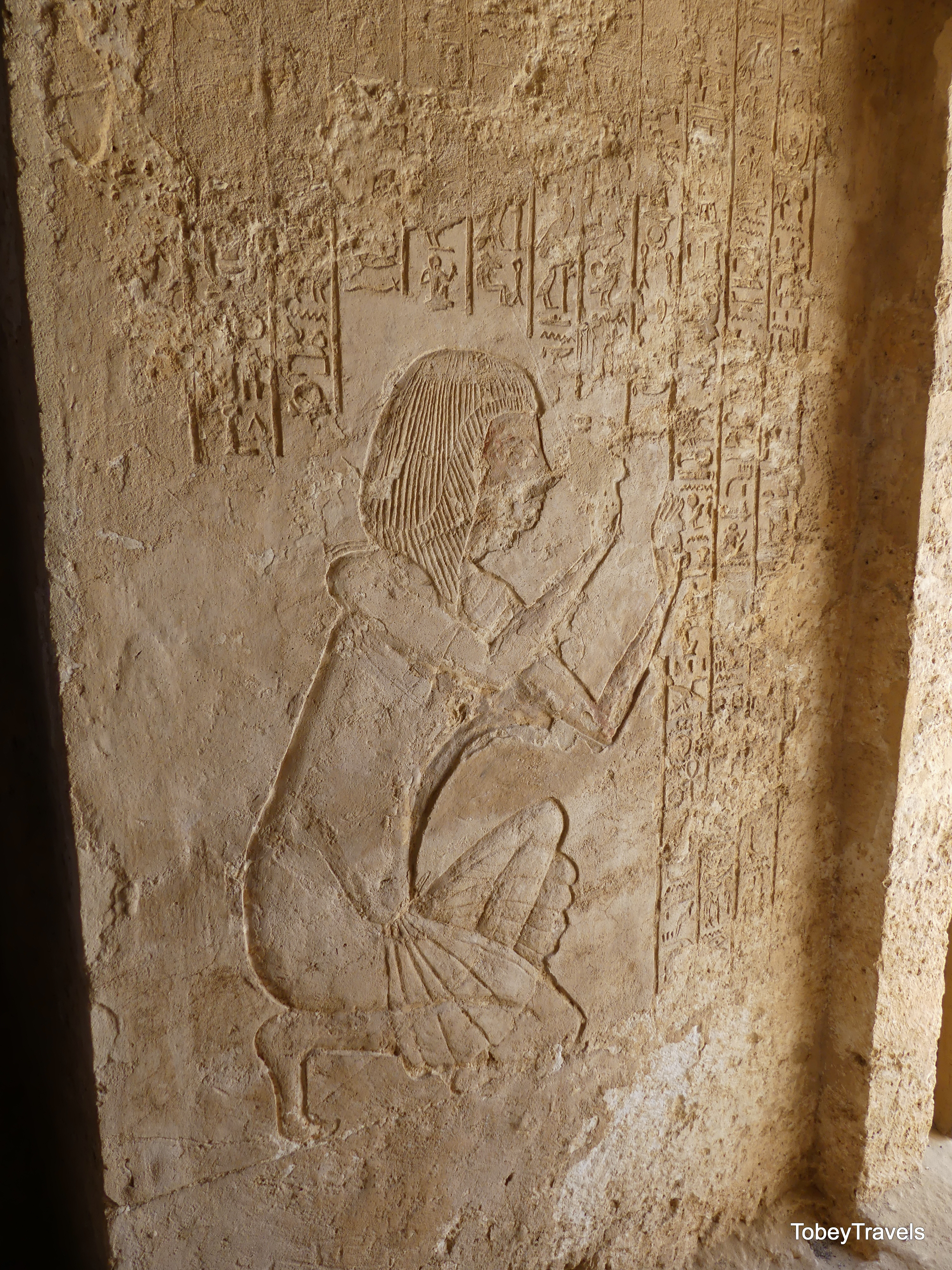
- Ramose adoring royal cartouches in his Amarna tomb doorway
- 27.6617°N 30.9056°E
- Type: Tomb
- Location: Minya, Egypt

History
- Built: c. 1350 BC

Southern Tomb 11 is an ancient sepulchre located at Amarna, Egypt. It was used for the burial of Ramose, whose titles included, "Royal scribe, Commander of troops of the Lord of the Two Lands, Steward of Nebmaatra (Amenhotep III)". This title is inscribed in Ramose's Amarna Tomb 11 where Ramose praises Amenhotep III for his wisdom and generosity. This tomb inscription establishes that Ramose began his career under Amenhotep III and continued to serve under Amenhotep IV.

It is unknown whether he was the same person as the Vizier Ramose whose Theban tomb is TT55, but it seems unlikely because they have different titles and the names of their wives do not agree.

The tomb is small and the main body is undecorated. The entrance doorway shows Ramose being rewarded by the 18th Dynasty Pharaoh Amenhotep IV, together with scenes showing Nefertiti and Meritaten. Ramose, in turn, is depicted honouring several royal cartouches. In Ramose's Amarna Tomb 11's hall, is a niche surrounded by a double frame. Inside the frame is a pair of double seated statues carved from the rock and finished in plaster which touchingly depicts Ramose and his sister Nebetiunet.

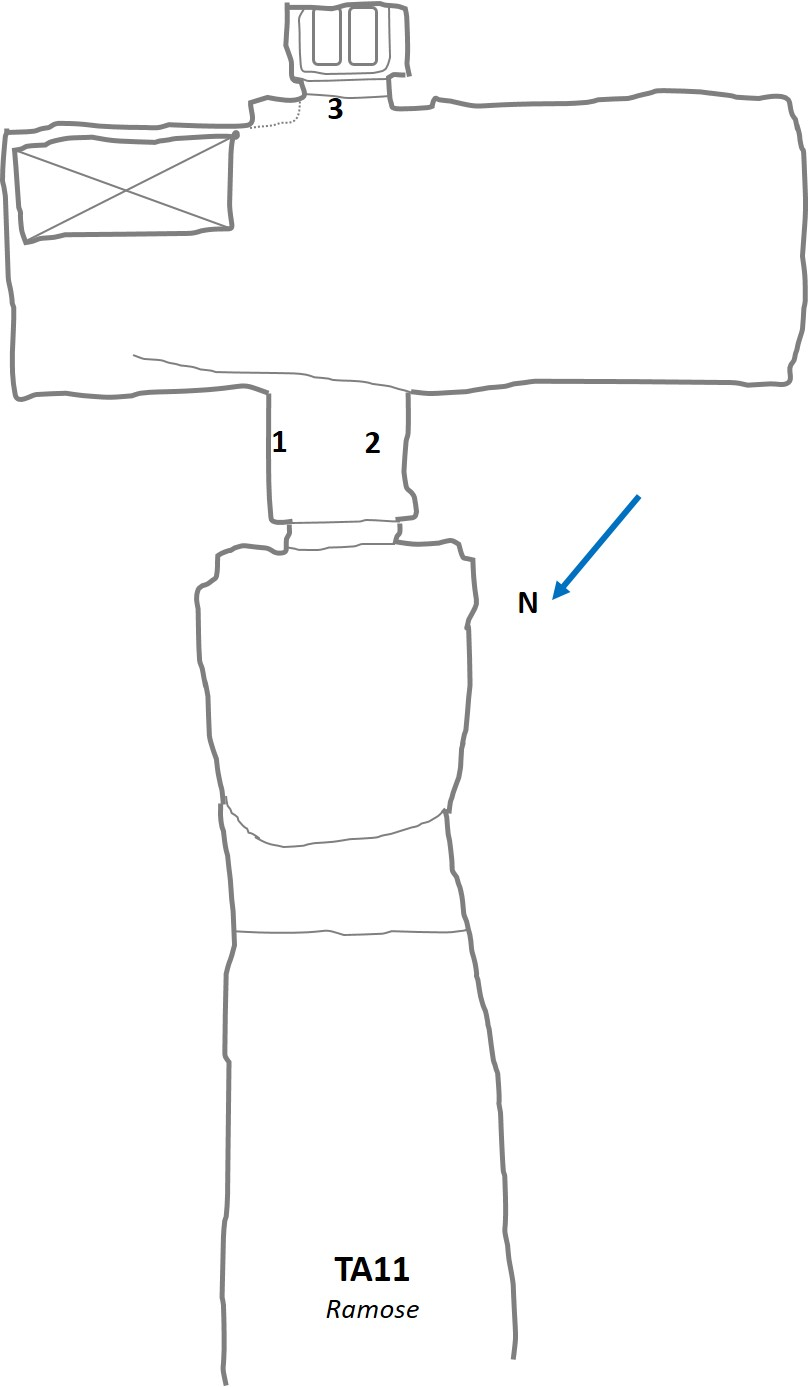
Plan of the Tomb of Ramose

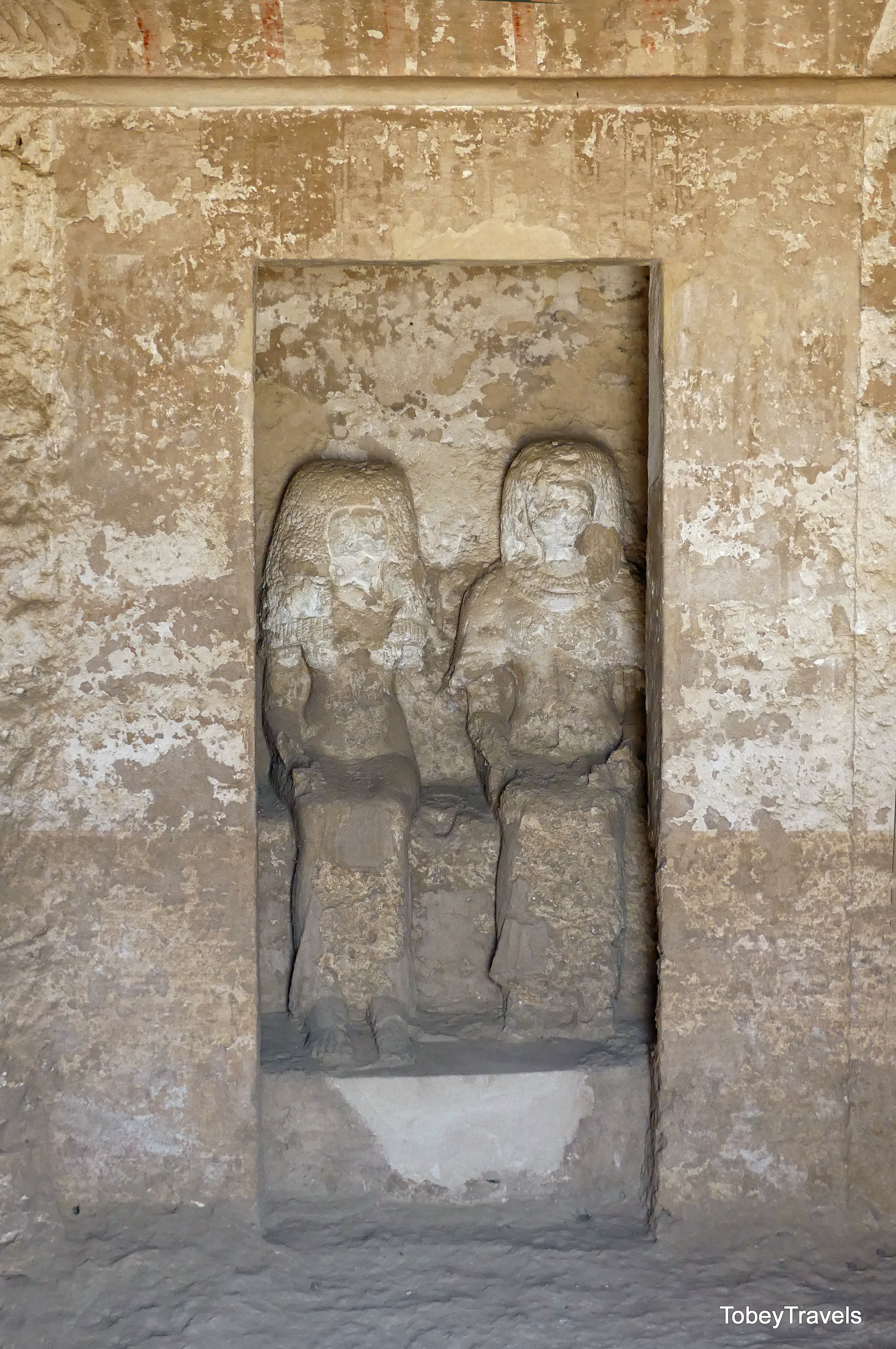
Niche containing a double statue of Ramose and his sister Nebetiunet
