= South Tombs Cemetery, Amarna =

Ancient cemetery in Egypt

The South Tombs Cemetery is an ancient Egyptian necropolis in Amarna, Upper Egypt. It was the burial place of low status individuals from the ancient city of Akhetaten. The site is located close to the Southern Tombs of the Nobles. Archaeological excavation was undertaken by the Egypt Exploration Society between 2006 and 2013, revealing that those interred in the cemetery lived short, hard lives.

== Discovery ==
This cemetery was discovered in 2003 during GPS surveying of the desert by the Egypt Exploration Society. It is situated on the east side of a narrow wadi that runs southward and to the east behind Southern Tomb 25 (Ay). It appears to have been thoroughly robbed and partially washed away by floods, leaving a scatter of human bone on the floor of the valley and across the plain. It was the subject of a systematic survey in 2005.

== Investigation and findings ==
Excavation commenced in 2006 and concluded in 2013. 381 graves were excavated across the four main areas - wadi mouth, lower, upper, and wadi end - with the aim of recovering 400 individuals. Extrapolations from this data estimate the cemetery contains 6000 individuals. The burials of men, women, children, and infants occur in the proportions expected for the time period, with high levels of infant and childhood mortality. The deceased were interred wrapped in fabric or matting, and placed in coffins made of tamarisk stems, palm mid-rib, or more rarely a coffin made of wood, pottery, or mud. In one instance a wooden coffin was found inside a mud-brick vault. No evidence of artificial mummification was found, although the body could be wrapped in linen strips. Grave goods as a whole are uncommon; when present they consist most frequently of pottery vessels, sometimes containing food offerings - in one instance pomegranates were found interred with a baby. Other grave goods found include kohl tubes and applicators, bronze tweezers, a mirror wrapped in fabric, a model oar, and an adze. Amulets or other items of jewelry are rare but when they do occur take the form of protective deities such as Taweret, necklaces of faience beads, scarabs, including ones inscribed for Thutmose III or Amenhotep III, copper toe rings, or more unusually, a gold bracelet on the wrist of a baby.

The graves were covered by a cairn of stones, now mostly destroyed, and some were topped with a grave marker; the occasional scatter of mud brick may indicate some tombs had a brick superstructure. Two limestone pyramidions were recovered, along with 15 stelae which mostly had a pointed, triangular shape. Those with a carved scene show the deceased receiving offerings; the more common type features a rectangular depression where a scene, of which no trace remains, would be painted or inserted.

=== Layout ===
The layout of the cemetery appears organic, and reflects what is most likely family-level organisation of plots. Despite areas of crowding, the graves never encroach on each other. All are well cut, with vertical walls, and closely match the size and shape of the coffin, indicating that, while the grave was likely not pre-cut, it was the work of professionals and not of the family.

=== Decorated coffins ===
40 wooden coffins were uncovered, accounting for about 10% of burials at South Tombs Cemetery. Half of these were simple undecorated boxes; the remaining 20 coffins had surviving painted decoration. Of these, only eight were complete enough for their decorative scheme to be studied. The simplest decoration belonged to a child's box-shaped coffin. It consists of yellow text bands framed by black lines; no text or images were added. The seven remaining decorated coffins appear to be anthropoid though many are in a fragile condition due to the disintegration of the wood, either through rotting or by termites.

The colour scheme is black-based, with yellow bands imitating the straps seen on mummy wrappings. The decorative themes can be divided into two types: those that preserve the pre-Amarna Osiride decoration, and a new 'godless' type, not attested outside Amarna, featuring offering bearers in place of the usual funerary gods. Three coffins of each decoration type were found; one was undetermined. The text found on this new type features prayers for offerings and other benefits, rather than the traditional recitations derived from Chapter 151 of the Book of the Dead. However, even where they are well preserved, the inscriptions are not always legible. The text preserved on one coffin contains recognisable groups of hieroglyphs but they do not form coherent sentences, suggesting that although written with a practiced hand, the writer was not literate.

Names are present on coffins with legible inscriptions. One is a woman named Maia, who died at 40–45 years old. Her disturbed remains were found inside a badly termite-eaten coffin made of sycamore fig, tamarisk, and Mimusops sp. wood. Horizontal bands give short prayers and she asks to receive offerings; the side panels preserve mourning figures. There is no sign or mention of the Aten or royal family. Another coffin of the same godless type bears the names Hesy(t)en-Ra and Hesy(t)en-Aten. The name Tiy is preserved on a coffin with traditional decoration; inside was the partial skeleton of a woman aged 40–45 years.

=== Hairstyles ===
Though the human remains were usually entirely skeletonised, desiccated skin and preserved hair was encountered. A variety of hairstyles were found preserved on skulls, with some in more brittle condition than others. The hair types range from very curly black hair to straight brown hair, probably indicating ethnic variation. Hair was generally parted in the centre. The styles consisted of three-strand braids approximately 1-2 centimetres wide and commonly not more than 20 centimetres (7.9 in) long; in one instance the braids were 30 centimetres (12 in) long. Fat was used to secure the hairstyles and no pins or other means of fastening were found. Coils or ringlets were found around the ears, otherwise there is no clear pattern to the hairstyles. Hair extensions were used, often braided into very short hair (10 centimetres long) and the joins were covered by the individual's own hair. One very complex hairstyle consisted of 70 extensions placed in differed layers on the head. Generally, more extensions were found in brown hair than in black hair. The colours of extensions varied from grey to dark black on one individual which suggests hair had been obtained from many different donors. The grey hair of one woman was dyed orange-red, probably with henna.

Evidence of a sidelock of youth of fine braids 8-10 centimetres long was found on at least three children but was most clear on two: on the left side of the head on one child, and on the back right side of other. Loose hair was found on the top of the heads.

=== Head cone ===
A significant find from the South Tombs Cemetery was the first extant 'incense cone' on the head of an adult woman in an undisturbed grave. Another cone was excavated from the North Tombs Cemetery. The cone was originally a low dome; it is hollow, now brittle, and has a silky feel. Chemical analysis has revealed they are composed of natural wax. No evidence of any perfume was found, although it may have evaporated over time. The hollow shell may have been filled with a soft perfume, or have been made intentionally hollow for burial. The cones may have been shaped around, or filled with, a textile, as impressions of fabric are present on the inner surface. The purpose of the cones is not known for certain. They may have served to purify the deceased, or were perhaps associated with rebirth - the princess Meketaten is depicted wearing such a cone while she is mourned by her family.

There were likely other incense cones present at the South Tombs Cemetery, as smaller fragments were found, or their presence may be indicated by the discolouration of hair or bone. In some instances, a fabric covering was present on the head, indicating the cone may have been wrapped separately. There is also evidence of braids being styled into a platform, possibly to support a cone.

=== Health ===
Analysis of the skeletal remains revealed that those who lived and died at Amarna lived short, hard lives. 26.1% of examined individuals died before the age of seven. Mortality increased throughout childhood and early adulthood, peaking between the ages of 15–25, when it would normally be expected to be lowest. Nutritional deficiencies were common, with 36.4% of subadults and 12.7% of adults exhibiting cribra orbitalia; there is also some evidence of scurvy. Analysis of microwear on the teeth of these individuals indicates a diet that was made up primarily of grain. The lack of butchered animal remains from the city suggests meat was not commonly eaten by the general populace. Almost half of the adults examined have evidence of osteophytes and two-thirds of adults have some form of trauma, usually related to the spine, such as compression fractures of the vertebrae, Schmorl's nodes, and spondylosis. Such injuries are thought to be the result of carrying heavy loads such as water from wells, or talatat blocks for the construction of the city. Fractures of arms or legs are less common and probably represent accidents; only four individuals show evidence of wounds caused by weapons. One of these individuals is thought to have been a soldier, based on his multiple traumatic injuries that include a fractured sternum, healed and healing rib fractures, a "parry" fracture to the left arm, and two stab wounds to the pelvis, the first of which healed, the second became infected and likely contributed to his death. He also had a different diet with better nutrition than others buried at Amarna as he does not show signs of cribra orbitalia, and has extensive dental caries and abscesses. As a result of chronic physical stresses and poor diets, Amarna adults are, on average, the shortest in all of ancient Egypt. Cranio-morphological study of the skeletal remains reveals a highly diverse population, likely originating from across Egypt, and including people of foreign descent.

Plague has been suggested as the cause of the high mortality in young adults. Amarna letters EA 11, 35, 96, 244, and 362 mention plague both within Egypt and in neighbouring countries, while the Plague Prayers of Mursili II mention plague breaking out among Egyptian prisoners of war captured in the aftermath of the Zannanza affair, in the reign of his father Suppiluliuma I. A high frequency of fleas and bed bugs were encountered in samples from the Workmen's Village on the edge of the city; this finding implies that ectoparasite levels were high in the population and the conditions were perfect for the spread of an epidemic.
