= Parennefer =

Ancient Egyptian official

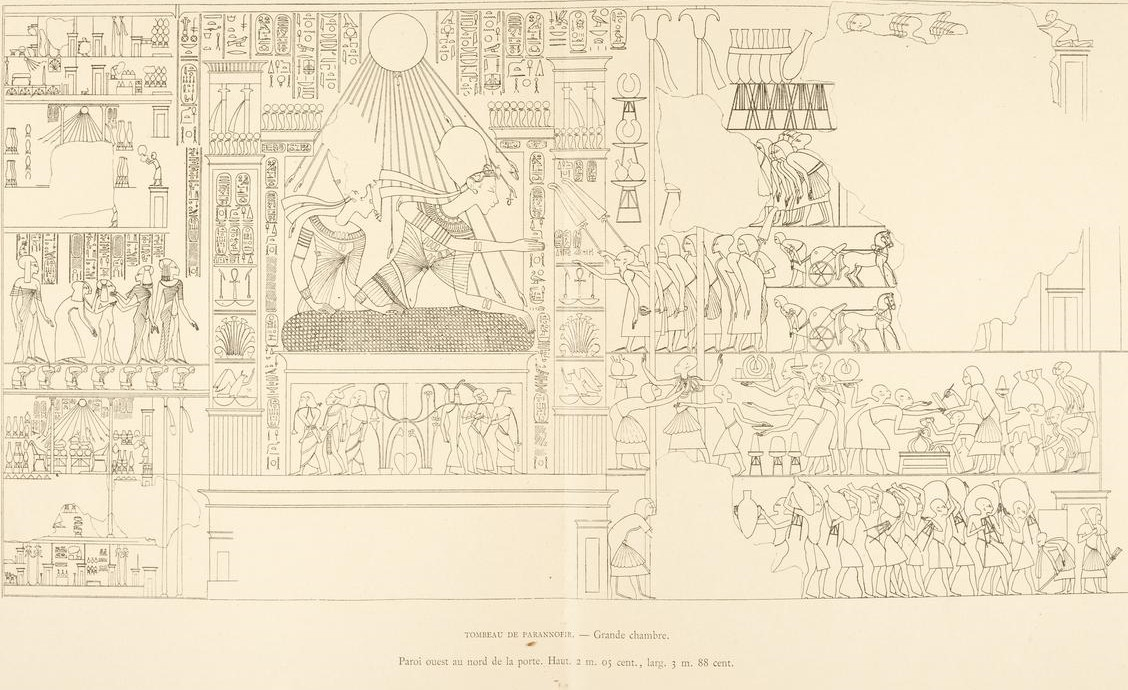
Akhenaten rewarding Parennefer, from the latter tomb at Amarna

The ancient Egyptian noble Parennefer was Akhenaten's close advisor before the latter came to the throne, and in later times Parennefer served as his Royal Butler, an office which brought him into intimate contact with the king. His titles include "The King's Cup Bearer," "Washer of the King's Hands," "Chief Craftsman," and "Overseer of All the Works in the Mansion of Aten." He was instrumental in imposing the "Amarna style" in architecture.

== Tombs ==
Parennefer had two tombs constructed for him, an unfinished one in Thebes, (TT188), which was a precursor of the Amarna rock tombs. An inscription in this tomb stresses that one had to pay one's due to all the gods, although the Aten was to be treated preferentially. The tomb also witnesses some of the changes in the world view occurring under Amenhotep III and Akhenaten, e.g. the royal ka, which had been anthropomorphic became more abstract, a development culminating in the complete abandonment of anthropomorphic depictions of the ka at Akhetaten.

He built a second tomb (Amarna Tomb 7) at Akhetaten, in the Southern group of tombs, where he is shown being rewarded by Akhenaten with many gold collars.
