= Mutbenret =

Ancient Egyptian noblewoman

G15 t M30 t Aa29 B1
Mutbenret
in hieroglyphs
Era: New Kingdom
(1550–1069 BC)

Mutbenret (older reading "Benretmut") or Mutnodjmet was an Egyptian noblewoman, and said to be the sister of the King's Great Wife Nefertiti.

== Name ==
The reading of the name is disputed, as the hieroglyphs for "nedjem" (nḏm) and "bener" (bnr) are similar in appearance and both signify "sweet." While some scholars prefer the form Mutbenret, others prefer Mutnodjmet. Likely relevant, the name of Queen Tanodjmy is written with the "bener" sign followed by a phonetic complement m, indicating that the ostensible "bener" in that instance is to be read as "nedjem" and that the two signs may have functioned interchangeably in such names; the same might be true for Mutbenret/Mutnodjmet, in which case the latter form would be correct. It is hypothesized that Nefertiti and her sister Mutbenret/Mutnodjmet might have been daughters of the future king Ay, Nefertiti by a wife different from his future Queen Tey (who is attested as Nefertiti's "nurse"); Mutbenret/Mutnodjmet could have been born by any of Ay's wives.

== Career ==
Mutbenret/Mutnodjmet appears in a number of scenes at Amarna as a member of the royal court of Akhenaten and Nefertiti. According to some scholars, Mutbenret/Mutnodjmet was the same person as Mutnodjmet, the wife of Horemheb, the last ruler of the Eighteenth Dynasty. However, there is no conclusive evidence for or against this theory, and some scholars are skeptical.

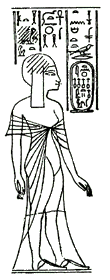
Mutbenret/Mutnodjmet in Parennefer's Tomb 7 in Amarna.

== Appearances in Art ==
Mutbenret/Mutnodjmet appears in several of the Tombs of the Nobles at Amarna:

- In the tomb of Panehesy (Tomb 6) the presence of two dwarfs on a lintel in a register associated with an offering scene indicate that Mutbenret/Mutnodjmet was depicted nearby (probably in a register next to the royal princesses).

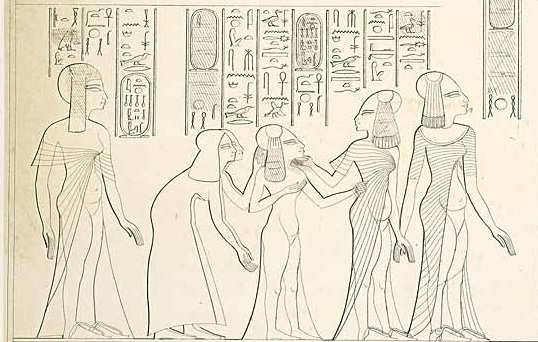
Mutbenret/Mutnodjmet behind Meritaten, Meketaten and Ankhesenpaaten and their nurse. Award scene of Parennefer. (From Lepsius 1900: 109.)

- Mutbenret/Mutnodjmet is depicted behind the royal princesses in the award scene for Parennefer in Tomb 7.

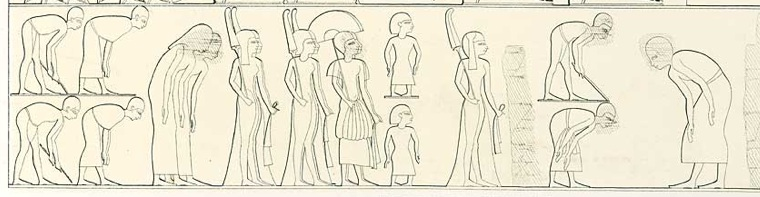
Mutbenret/Mutnodjmet behind two bowing courtiers. Accompanied by two dwarfs. (Lepsius 1900: 91.)

- Mutbenret/Mutnodjmet is depicted in the award scene for Tutu in Tomb 8. In the register below the King and Queen we see the Queen's Sister Mutbenret/Mutnodjmet with her two dwarfs, several fan bearers and the nurses of the Princesses.
- In the tomb of May (Tomb 14) the royal family is shown worshiping the Aten. Akhenaten and Nefertiti are accompanied by three princesses. Meritaten and Meketaten are named as the two princesses in the lower register; the third princess depicted above them is most likely Ankhesenpaaten. Each is shown shaking a sistrum. Above the princesses we see the Queen's sister Mutbenret/Mutnodjmet accompanied by her two dwarfs.
- The lintel in anonymous Tomb 20 shows the royal family adoring the Aten. We see the same scene on the left and the right but in mirror image. Akhenaten is shown on both sides wearing the Khepresh crown. Nefertiti and her daughters were never carved. The inscriptions show that Nefertiti was supposed to follow her husband, followed by Meritaten, Meketaten and Ankhesenpaaten. Behind the princesses we see the Queen's sister Mutbenret/Mutnodjmet.
- In anonymous Tomb 22, the lintel shows the royal family adoring the Aten. Akhenaten is shown wearing the Khepresh crown. Nefertiti, wearing her blue crown, followed her husband, followed by three princesses, probably Meritaten, Meketaten and Ankhesenpaaten. Behind the princesses we see the Queen's sister Mutbenret/Mutnodjmet.
- Mutbenret/Mutnodjmet is depicted in the tomb of Ay (Southern Tomb 25), where she is shown as a young girl. Her formal titles include "Sister of the King's Great Wife" (indicating a direct relationship with Nefertiti). Mutbenret/Mutnodjmet is depicted in a scene on the thickness of an outer wall. She is accompanied by her two dwarfs Hemetniswerneheh and Mutef-Pre.

It is speculated that an alabaster piece found in Tutankhamun's tomb of a boat carrying a lady with a dwarf represents Mutbenret/Mutnodjmet with one of these men.

== Bibliography ==
- Davies, Norman De Garis, The rock tombs of el-Amarna, Part 2: The Tombs of Panehesy and Meryra II, London, 1905.
- Davies, Norman De Garis, The rock tombs of el-Amarna. Part 6: Tombs of Parennefer, Tutu and Ay, London, 1908.
- Dodson, Aidan, and Dyan Hilton, The Complete Royal Families of Ancient Egypt, Thames & Hudson, 2004 ISBN 0-500-05128-3
- Dodson, Aidan, Nefertiti, Queen and Pharaoh of Egypt: Her Life and Afterlife, Cairo, 2020.
- Freed, R. E., Y. J. Markowitz, et al. (eds.), Pharaohs of the Sun: Akhenaten: Nefertiti: Tutankhamen, Boston: Museum Fine Arts/Bulfinch Press/Little, Brown and Company, 1999.
- Lepsius, Carl Richard, Denkmäler aus Aegypten und Aethiopien Abtheilung 3, Leipzig, 1900 (published posthumously).
- Martin, G. T., "Queen Mutnedjmet at Memphis and el-Amarna," L'Égyptologie en 1979: Axes prioritaires de recherches, vol. 2, Paris: Colloques internationaux du Centre national de la Recerche Scientifique, 1982: 275-278.
- Mladjov, Ian, "Rediscovering Queen Tanodjmy: A probable link between Dynasties 18 and 19," Göttinger Miszellen 242 (2014) 57-70. online
- Murnane, W.J., Texts from the Amarna Period in Egypt, Atlanta, 1995.
