= Overseer of cattle =

Ancient Egyptian official position

m r E1 Z2
imi-r jḥw
in hieroglyphs
Era: New Kingdom
(1550–1069 BC)

The Overseer of cattle (Ancient Egyptian: jmy-r jḥw) was an Ancient Egyptian official position, during the New Kingdom.

== Role ==
The Onomasticon of Amenope, which lays out the arrangement of Egypt's administration in the Ramesside period, lists the overseer of cattle as one of the members of the "high council" (qnbt ꜥꜢt), led by the vizier, which was responsible for civil administration. Within this council, the overseer of cattle belonged to the branch of the administration tasked with the administration of resources, which was headed by overseer of the treasuries. The primary responsibility of the position was the maintenance of an inventory of all cattle in the country and the collection of their hides.

Inscriptions indicate that in year 3 of Ramesses IV (1152 BC), the overseer of cattle was one of several other high-ranking civil and military officials sent with over 7,000 workers on a quarrying expedition to Wadi Hammamat. The overseer's role on this expedition was to secure supplies of cattle hides, which were then handed over to the army scribes to distribute to the workers. This expedition is an example of the way in which different branches of Egyptian administration were able to collaborate effectively in the Nineteenth dynasty. By contrast, in the Eighteenth dynasty decree of Horemheb, army regiments are reprimanded for requisitioning cattle hides from local people, something that only the overseer of cattle was allowed to do.

In the Wilbour Papyrus probably from year 4 of Ramesses V (1146 BC), the overseer of cattle has ultimate control over some plots of royal land (khato) and land belonging to the Pharaoh's harem, which were then placed under the administration of two layers of subordinate officials and worked collectively by local labourers.

A separate overseer of cattle for the properties belonging to the Precinct of Amun-Re at Thebes existed by the reign of Thutmose II. There was another overseer of cattle in the provincial administration of Nubia under the authority of the Viceroy of Kush, during the reign of Tutankhamun.

== Bibliography ==
- Gnirs, Andrea M. (2013). "Coping with the Army: The Military and the State in the New Kingdom". In Moreno Garcia, Juan Carlos (ed.). Ancient Egyptian administration. Leiden, The Netherlands. pp. 639–718. ISBN 9789004250086.
- Grandet, Pierre (2013). "The Ramesside State". In Moreno Garcia, Juan Carlos (ed.). Ancient Egyptian administration. Leiden, The Netherlands. pp. 831–900. ISBN 9789004250086.
- Katary, Sally L. D. (2013). "The Administration of Institutional Agriculture in the New Kingdom". In Moreno Garcia, Juan Carlos (ed.). Ancient Egyptian administration. Leiden, The Netherlands. pp. 719–784. ISBN 9789004250086.
- Morkot, Robert (2013). "From Conquered to Conqueror: The Organization of Nubia in the New Kingdom and the Kushite Administration of Egypt". In Moreno Garcia, Juan Carlos (ed.). Ancient Egyptian administration. Leiden, The Netherlands. pp. 911–964. ISBN 9789004250086.
- Shirley, JJ (2013). "Crisis and Restructuring of the State: From the Second Intermediate Period to the Advent of the Ramesses". In Moreno Garcia, Juan Carlos (ed.). Ancient Egyptian administration. Leiden, The Netherlands. pp. 521–606. ISBN 9789004250086.
