= Tomb of Kha and Merit =

Ancient Egyptian tomb

Theban tomb TT8
- Burial site of Kha and Merit
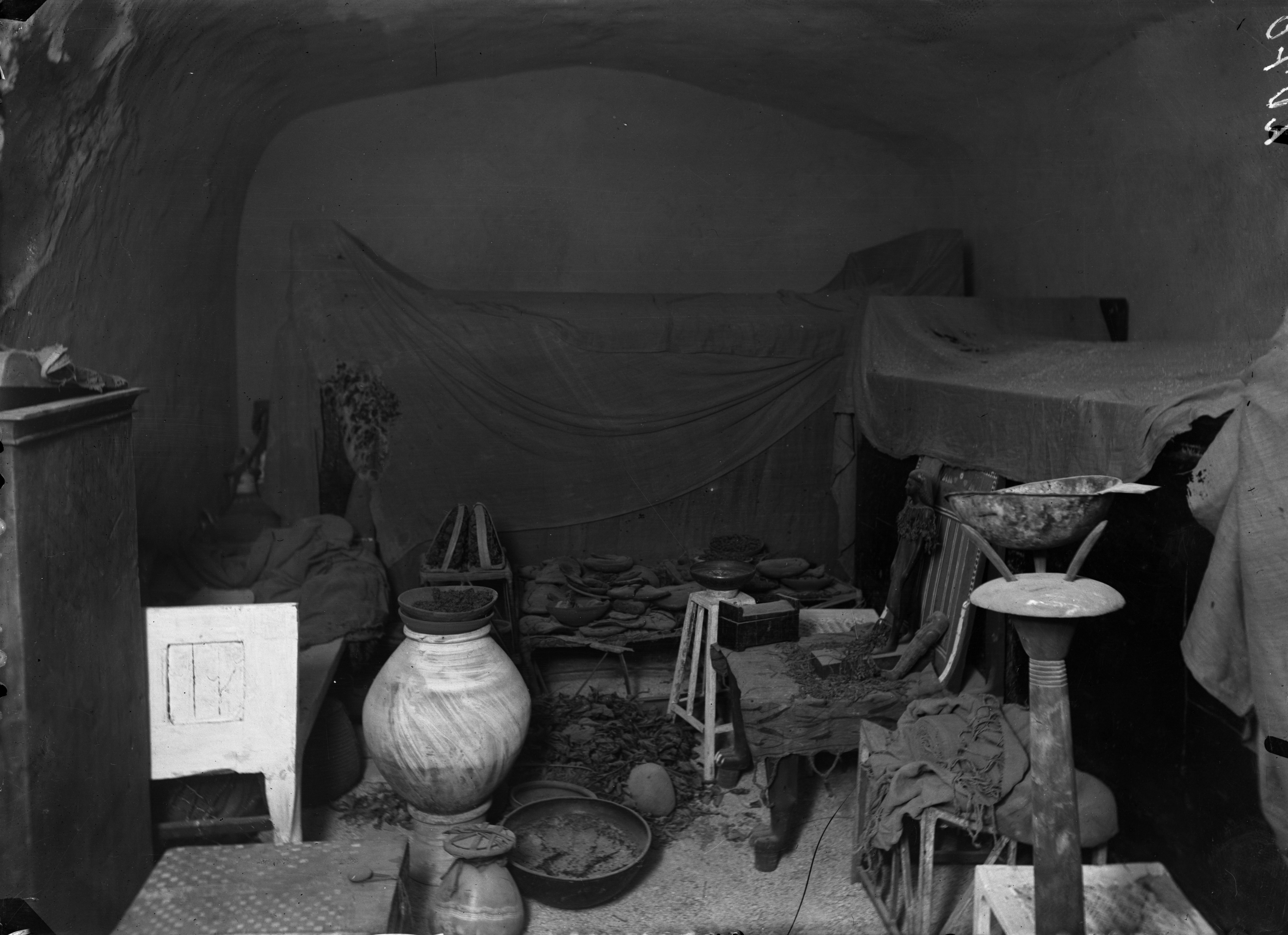
- The burial chamber of Kha and Merit as discovered in 1906

- Location within Egypt
- Coordinates: 25°43′44.54″N 32°36′2.3″E
- Location: Deir el-Medina, Theban Necropolis
- Discovered: Before 1818 (chapel); 15 February 1906 (tomb)
- Excavated by: Ernesto Schiaparelli (1906); Bernard Bruyère (1924)
- Decoration: Offering and feasting scenes (chapel); Undecorated (tomb)
- Layout: Straight axis
- ← Previous; TT7 Next → TT9

The tomb of Kha and Merit, also known by its tomb number Theban Tomb 8 or TT8, is the funerary chapel and burial place of the ancient Egyptian foreman Kha and his wife Merit, in the northern cemetery of the workmen's village of Deir el-Medina. Kha supervised the workforce who constructed royal tombs during the reigns of the pharaohs Amenhotep II, Thutmose IV and Amenhotep III (r. 1425 – 1353 BC) in the mid-Eighteenth Dynasty of the early New Kingdom of Egypt. Of unknown background, he probably rose to his position through skill and was rewarded by at least one king. He and his wife Merit had three known children. Kha died in his 60s, while Merit died before him, seemingly unexpectedly, in her 20s or 30s.

The couple's pyramid-shaped chapel has been known since at least 1818 when one of their funerary stele was purchased by the antiquarian Bernardino Drovetti. Scenes from the chapel were first copied in the 19th century by early Egyptologists including John Gardiner Wilkinson and Karl Lepsius. The paintings show Kha and Merit receiving offerings from their children and appearing before Osiris, god of the dead. The decoration has been damaged over the millennia, deteriorating due to structural decay and human actions.

Kha and Merit's tomb was cut into the base of the cliffs opposite their chapel. This position allowed the entrance to be quickly buried by debris deposited by landslides and later tomb construction, hiding its location from ancient robbers. The undisturbed tomb was discovered in February 1906 in excavations led by the Egyptologist Ernesto Schiaparelli on behalf of the Italian Archaeological Mission. The burial chamber contained over 400 items including carefully arranged stools and beds, neatly stacked storage chests of personal belongings, clothing and tools, tables piled with foods such as bread, meats and fruit, and the couple's two large wooden sarcophagi housing their coffined mummies. Merit's body was fitted with a funerary mask; Kha was provided with one of the earliest known copies of the Book of the Dead. Their mummies have never been unwrapped. X-rays, CT scanning and chemical analyses have revealed neither were embalmed in the typical fashion but that both bodies are well preserved. Both wear metal jewellery beneath their bandages, although only Kha has funerary amulets.

Almost all of the contents of the tomb were awarded to the excavators and were shipped to Italy soon after the discovery. They have been displayed in the Museo Egizio in Turin since their arrival, and an entire gallery is devoted to them. This has been redesigned several times.

== Kha's career and family ==
N28 a Y1 and mr i i t B1
Kha and Merit
in hieroglyphs
Era: New Kingdom
(1550–1069 BC)

Kha (Note: His name is also rendered as KhaꜤ (with an Egyptological ayin) or Khai.) (transliterated as ḪꜤi or ḪꜤ) was an official in the workmen's village known today as Deir el-Medina during the mid-Eighteenth Dynasty of the New Kingdom. Often referred to as an architect or foreman in modern publications, (Note: Beginning with the title of Ernesto Schiaparelli's 1927 publication, Kha has been commonly referred to as an "architect". His role is otherwise equated to a "foreman".) he directed the workmen who cut and decorated royal tombs in the Valley of the Kings ("the Great Place") in the reigns of three successive pharaohs: Amenhotep II, Thutmose IV, and Amenhotep III (r. 1425 – 1353 BC). Kha's origins are unknown. His only attested parent is his father, Iuy, who bears no titles and about whom nothing is known. Therefore, Kha is assumed to have attained his position through skill. Kha had a close relationship with an official named Neferhebef, suggested to be his mentor or tutor, who directed the construction of the tomb of Amenhotep II. Neferhebef is depicted with his wife in a place of honour in Kha's funerary chapel, and his name appears on items in Kha's tomb.

Kha likely began his career in the reign of Amenhotep II, possibly working on the royal tomb under the supervision of Neferhebef. (Note: Ernesto Schiaparelli considered Kha to have spent the bulk of his career under the preceding king, Thutmose III, based on seals bearing his throne name within the tomb, and the lack of a royal gift from that ruler. Schiaparelli suggested Kha was born late in the reign of Thutmose I, and placed his death in the reign of Amenhotep III, making him over 100 years old at death. From examination of his mummy, it is estimated Kha died in middle age, making it is unlikely that he was a mature professional over 60 years earlier during the rule of Thutmose III. It may instead reflect the use of this king's name long after his reign.) The Egyptologist Barbara Russo proposes that Kha attained the role of "chief of the Great Place" (ḥry m st Ꜥꜣ(t)) during the reign of Thutmose IV and reached the peak of his career during the reign of Amenhotep III, when he was given the title of "overseer of works in the Great Place" (imy-r kꜣ(w)t m st Ꜥꜣ(t)). He also bore the titles "overseer of the works of the central administration" (imy-r kꜣ(w)t pr-Ꜥꜣ) and "royal scribe" (sš nswt). (Note: Russo suggests Kha entered the bureaucracy at the end of his career based on these two titles. Eleni Vassilika suggests "royal scribe" was an early position he held, while Russo considers it was late in his career based on the style and intricacy of the two staffs the title appears on. The Egyptologist Dimitri Laboury doubts the title referred to Kha at all as the texts in both the chapel and tomb have many grammatical errors. He posits the sticks were gifts from a colleague who bore the title.)

Kha received several royal gifts over his career. The first was a gilded cubit rod given by Amenhotep II, and he later received a bronze bowl from Amenhotep III. His most significant award was a "gold of honour" or "gold of favour" (nbw n ḥswt), a reward given by the king to officials in recognition of their service, although which ruler it was given by is debated. Thutmose IV or Amenhotep III are considered the most likely candidates based on the style of the jewellery worn by the mummies of Kha and Merit. Preparations for his tomb likely began in the reign of Thutmose IV whose name occurs most frequently as a seal on vessels. Based on the style of his coffins and the art style seen on painted funerary chests in the tomb, Kha probably died in the third decade of Amenhotep III's reign.

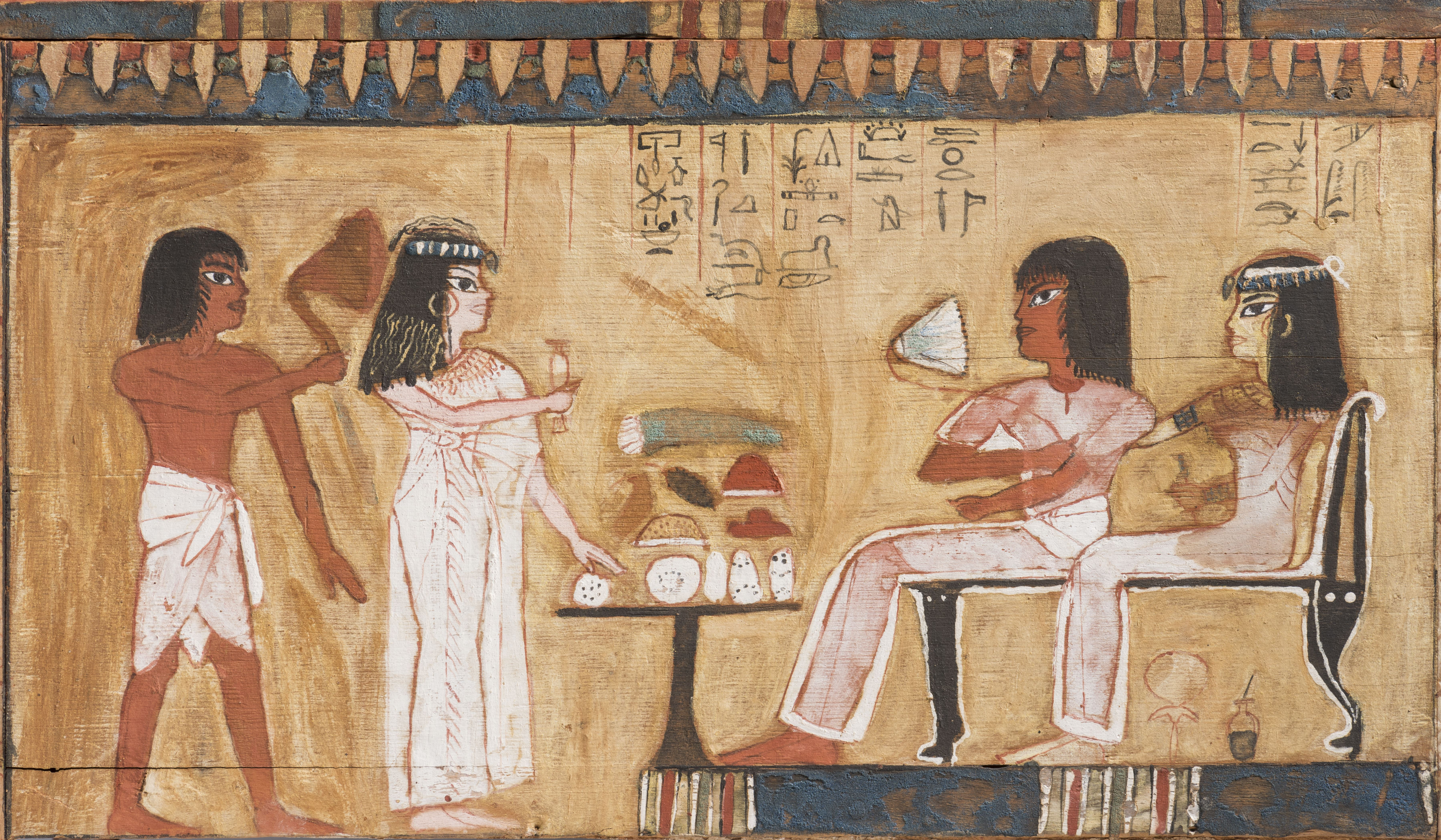
Kha and Merit receive offerings from two of their children, as depicted on a painted chest.

Merit (Mryt) also transcribed as Meryt, was Kha's wife. She was titled "lady of the house" (nbt pr), a common title given to married women. She seems to have unexpectedly predeceased Kha, as she was buried in a coffin intended for him. They had three known children: two sons named Amenemopet and Nakhteftaneb, and a daughter named Merit. Amenemopet also worked in Deir el-Medina and was titled "servant in the royal necropolis". No title is known for Nakhteftaneb; he seems to have been in charge of the funerary cult of his parents. Merit became a singer of Amun. All the children outlived their mother but Amenemopet may have died before his father.

== Chapel ==
=== Location and description ===
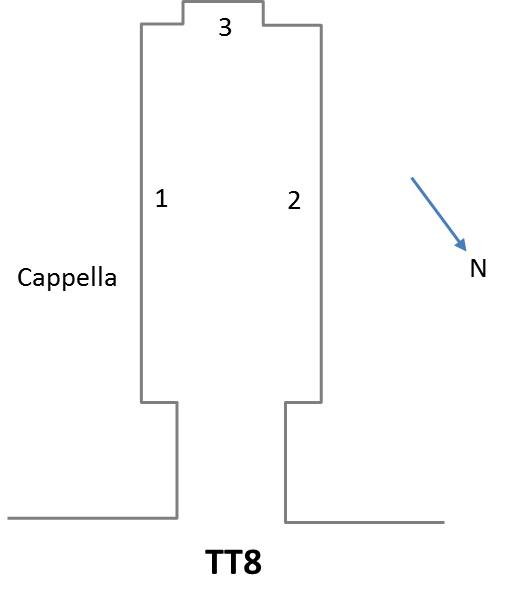
Plan of the interior of the chapel of TT8 labelled "chapel" in Italian 1: Left wall with banquet scene 2: Right wall with Osiris 3: Rear wall with central stele niche

The funerary chapel of Kha and Merit, numbered TT8, (Note: The standard numbering system for private tombs in the Theban necropolis was implemented by the Antiquities Service in the early 1900s and published by the Egyptologists Alan Gardiner and Arthur Weigall in 1913. Tombs and chapels discovered later were added in sequence. Kha and Merit's burial chamber, separated from their chapel, was initially given the tomb number 269 before being connected with the existing chapel number.) stands on a terrace at the northern end of the Deir el-Medina necropolis. It is a small pyramid, whose sides measure 4.66 by 4.72 metres (15.3 ft × 15.5 ft) with an incline of 75 degrees, giving the structure a projected total height of 9.32 metres (30.6 ft). Constructed of mudbrick, the exterior was plastered and painted white. It is an early example of the pyramid form at Deir el-Medina, derived from the tombs of contemporary nobility; this shape became typical in the workmen's village in later dynasties. Kha and his workmen would have built their own chapels in their down time between work on royal construction projects. The chapel would be the focus of the owner's cult after death, the place where visitors gave offerings to sustain the deceased in the afterlife.

The chapel faces northeast and has a single doorway with large doorposts. Nothing remains of the lintel and cornice they supported. Like other pyramid-chapels in the necropolis, there was probably a niche in the face of the pyramid, above the door, which held a small stele. The interior of the chapel is a single room, longer than it is wide, measuring 3 by 1.6 metres (9.8 ft × 5.2 ft) with a vaulted ceiling 2.15 metres (7.1 ft) high. A niche in the back wall housed a stele now in the Museo Egizio in Turin, Italy.

The pyramid-chapel was capped by a pyramidion of whitewashed sandstone. It is decorated on all sides with sunk bas-reliefs of Kha worshipping the sun god Ra and inscribed with hymns to the god at the stages of his journey: the east and damaged north faces adore Ra at sunrise, the south face praises him as he crosses the sky, and the west face worships Ra as he sets. The pyramidion was rediscovered on 8 February 1923 by the Egyptologist Bernard Bruyère in the courtyard of the tomb of Pashed (TT326), a few metres south-east of TT8. (Note: The pyramidion was previously described as coming from the courtyard of a tomb west of TT290.) It is now housed in the Louvre in Paris, France.

A rectangular walled enclosure surrounds the chapel, cut back into the rocky hillside at its rear. In front of the chapel is a rectangular courtyard, measuring approximately 8 by 8 metres (26 ft × 26 ft), which was probably entered through a small pylon-shaped gateway. Typically in Deir el-Medina, the tomb shaft was cut within this courtyard. In this case, it was instead cut into the base of the cliffs opposite. In 1924, Bernard Bruyère excavated the courtyard to see if an existing burial shaft close to the area was the reason for the separation. On the right side of the courtyard, 3 metres (9.8 ft) from the entrance of the chapel, in the expected location of a shaft, he found a pit 0.75 metres (2.5 ft) deep and 1 metre (3.3 ft) wide lined with mudbrick. Schiaparelli suggested that this pit was where some of the couple's funerary items, known before the discovery of the tomb, were originally deposited. Bruyère suggested the separation of chapel and tomb was instead because of the very poor quality rock beneath the courtyard.

The chapel was in a ruined state by the 19th and 20th centuries; the exterior was partially restored by the Institut Français d'Archéologie Orientale (IFAO). It is not open to tourists.

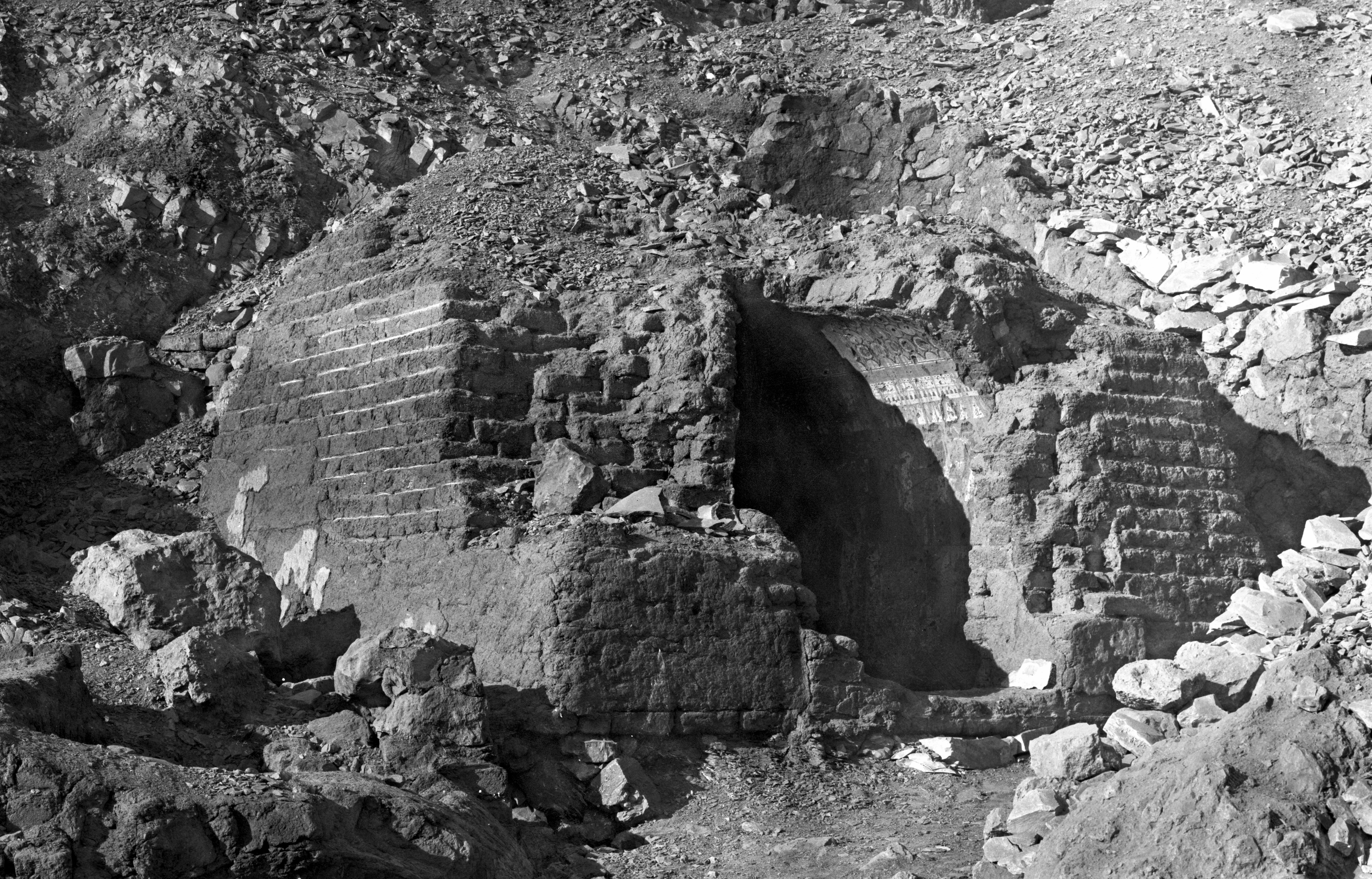
The chapel during Schiaparelli's 1906 excavations

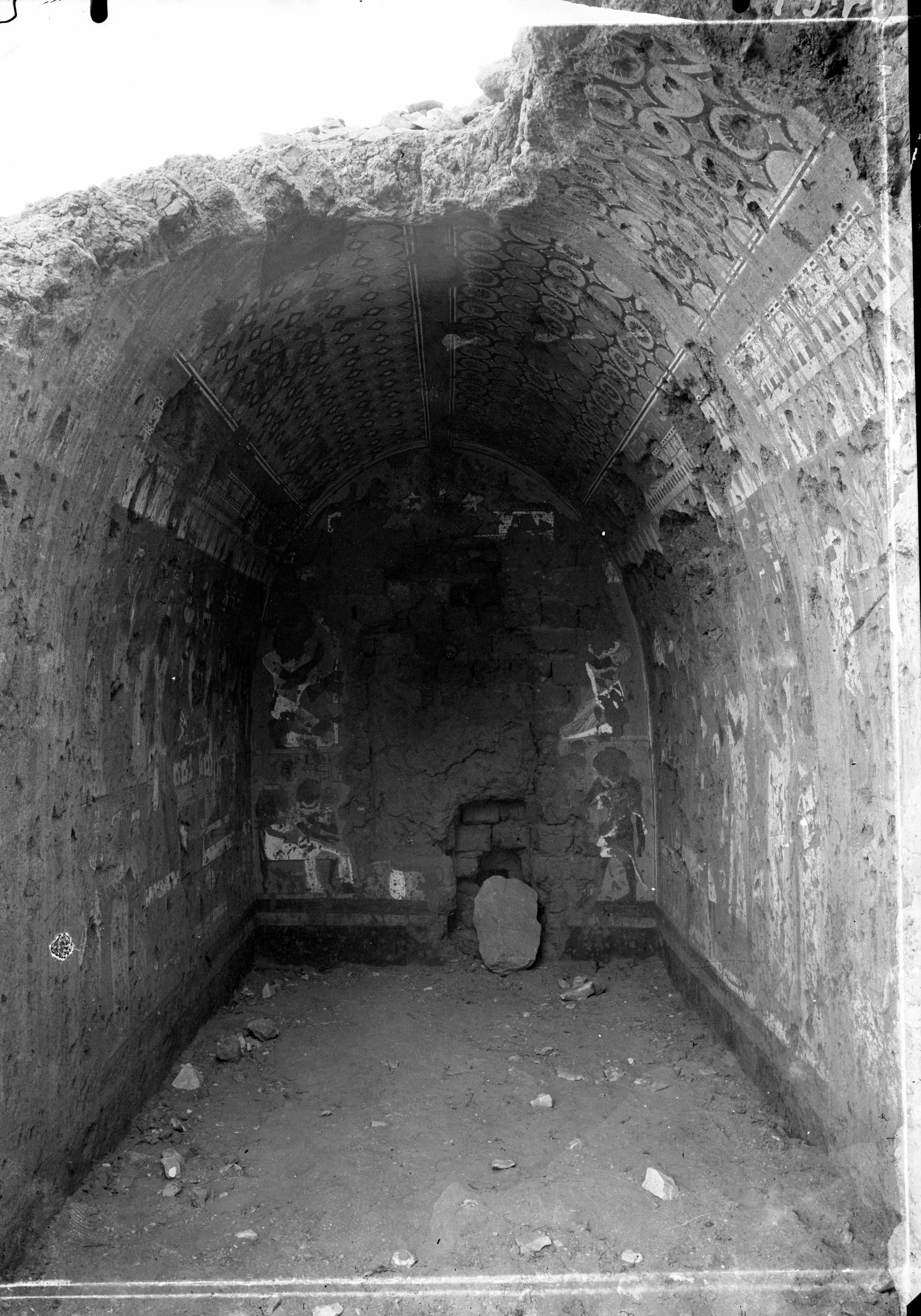
The interior of Kha and Merit's funerary chapel in 1906

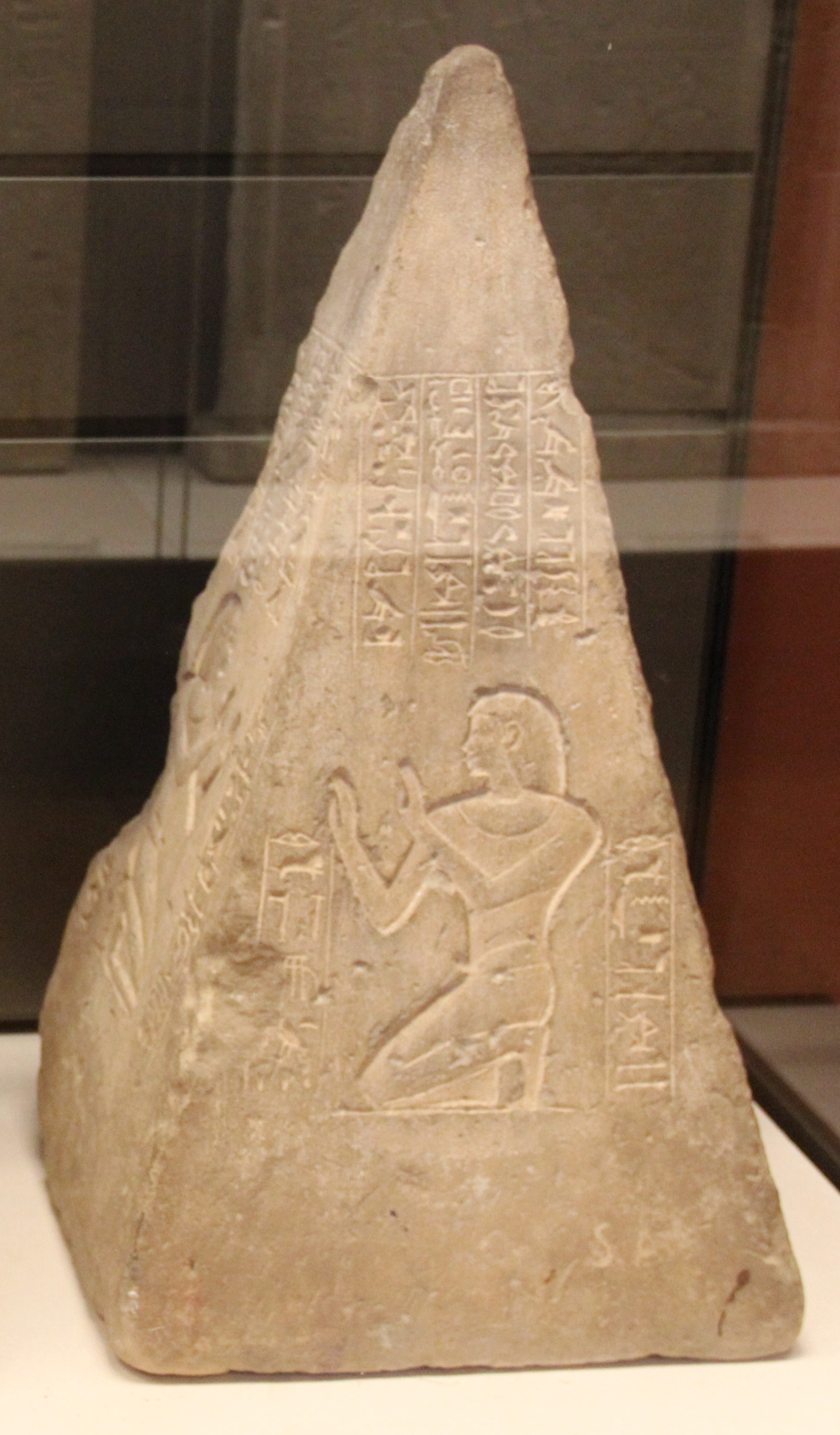
Pyramidion of Kha's chapel, now in the Louvre

=== Decoration ===
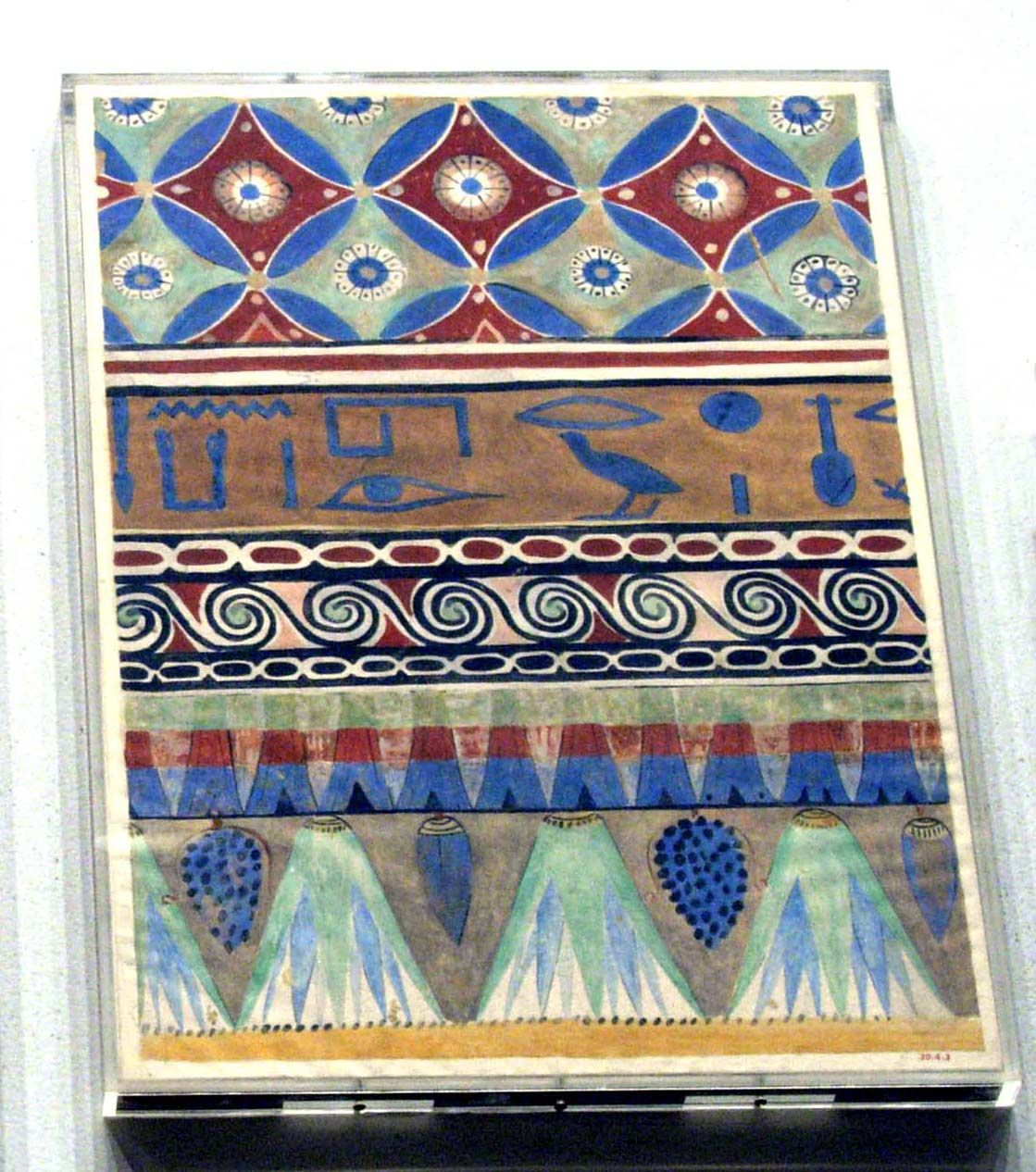
Facsimile by Charles K. Wilkinson of the painted motifs on the upper walls and ceiling of TT8's chapel, Metropolitan Museum of Art

The interior of the chapel was plastered and fully decorated. On stylistic grounds, it was completed in the reigns of Thutmose IV or Amenhotep III. As with the exterior, the decorative scheme mimics the types of scenes and layouts seen in the chapels of the elite. Kha presumably employed his own skilled workmen to execute the decoration. Unlike the tombs of nobles, the texts have errors such as unconventional hieroglyph groupings and omitted signs, indicating that the artists had limited literacy.

The ceiling is covered with two different geometric and floral patterns separated by a central inscription that runs the length of the room. The vault is bordered on each side by another band of text and an upper frieze of alternating lotus flowers, buds, and grapes separates the inscriptions from the wall scenes proper.

The left wall depicts a banquet scene. Kha and Merit are depicted on the far right, seated before an offering table; their daughter adjusts her father's collar and one of their sons presents them with offerings. Below this scene, a narrow register depicts an additional offering of four amphorae garlanded with flowers and fruit and attended by a servant. The rest of the wall depicts guests and musicians. In a lower register, offering bearers advance in the opposite direction, towards a seated couple who are now mostly obliterated by damage.

The right wall has the same layout as the left. The large scene depicts the god Osiris seated in a raised kiosk (canopy supported by columns); he receives offerings from Kha and Merit, who are accompanied by their children. In the two smaller registers, servants approach with offerings of a goat or gazelle and a white ox wearing a floral garland.

The back wall is divided into three registers around the central stele niche. A pair of Anubis-jackals lying on rectangular tomb-shrines face each other across a large bouquet in the uppermost, semi-circular register; unlike the rest of the decoration, which has a yellow background, this is executed on a light grey background. In the second register, Kha is depicted twice, once on the left and once on the right, kneeling and offering a bouquet. The left side of the lowest register shows Neferhebef and Taiunes seated with offerings before them and receiving ministrations from a man, on the right side of the register, dressed in the leopard skin of a sem-priest (one who conducted funerary rituals). He may be their son but his identity is unknown as the inscription is badly damaged.

The chapel was damaged only a decade or so after it went into use during the reign of Amenhotep III's successor, Akhenaten. The name of the god Amun was erased wherever it occurred as part of Akhenaten's iconoclasm against the deity. It was later restored but in a way that does not match the original text. Later, all the faces of the figures were hammered out, possibly by Copts. The decoration near the door deteriorated further after the partial collapse of the ceiling in this area. The back wall was damaged in the 19th century during the removal of the stele, and a graffito in hieratic, mentioned by Karl Lepsius in the 1840s, was destroyed sometime after his publication.

In the 19th century, the paintings were copied by several early Egyptologists including John Gardiner Wilkinson and Lepsius. Ernesto Schiaparelli briefly described the chapel in his 1927 publication of the burial chamber; a full study of the decoration was made in the 1930s by Jeanne Marie Thérèse Vandier d'Abbadie during the IFAO's excavations of the village.

=== Steles ===
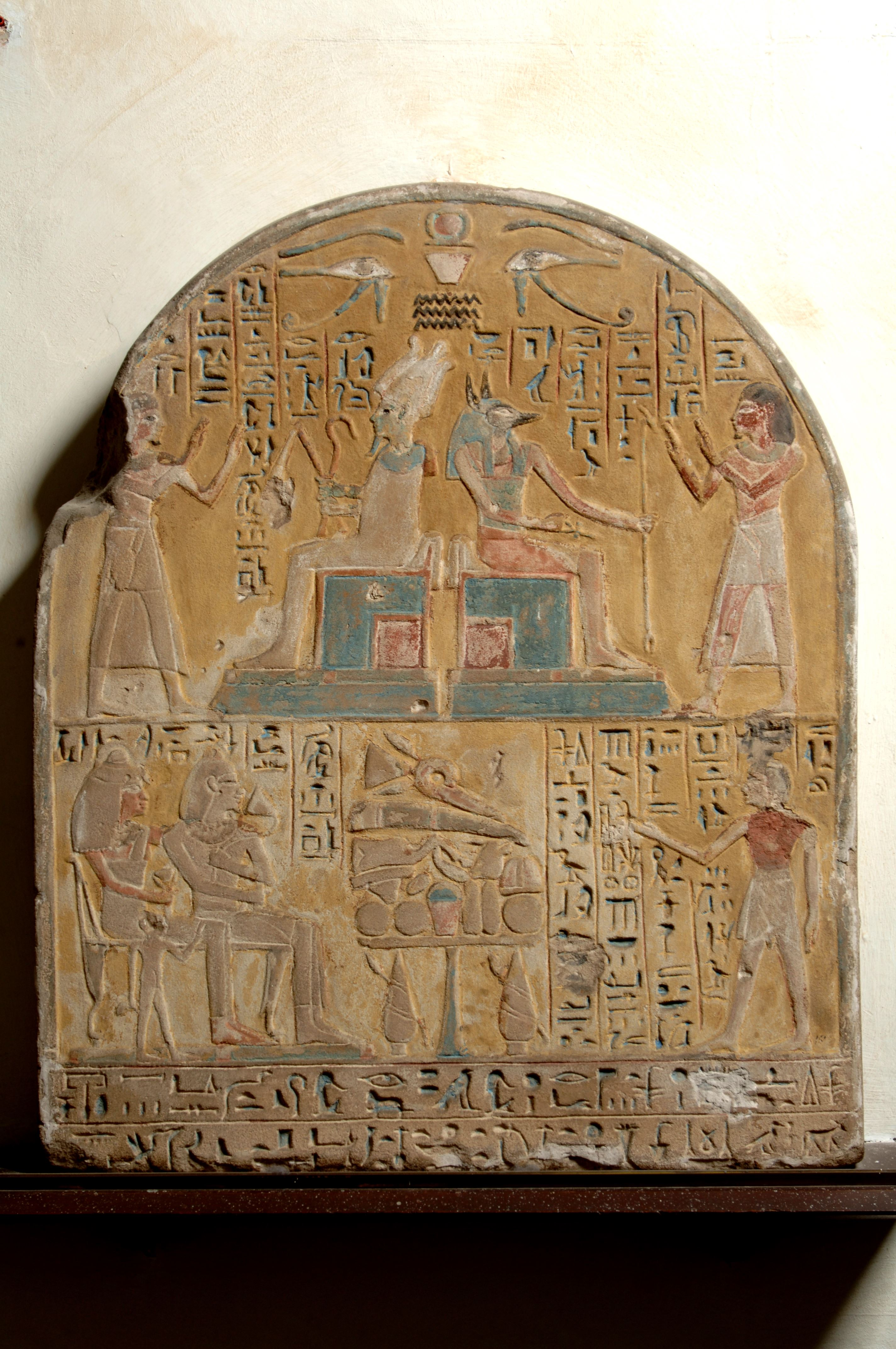
Funerary stele of Kha, now in the Museo Egizio, Turin

A painted stone stele dedicated to Kha and Merit stood in the niche in the back wall of the chapel. Around 1818 it was removed from the chapel and purchased by agents of the Italian antiquarian Bernardino Drovetti. In 1824 it was donated to the Museo Egizio as part of the Drovetti collection. The first register depicts Kha adoring Osiris and Anubis, who sit back to back. In the second register, Kha and Merit, accompanied by a young child, sit before a table of offerings; their son Amenemopet stands on the far side officiating. The two lines of text at the bottom of the stele give offerings to the gods Amun, Ra, Ra-Horakhty, and Osiris, and ask for funerary offerings to be given.

A second stele associated with Kha is housed in the British Museum, London but its attribution is disputed. The upper register depicts Thutmose IV offering floral bouquets and incense to an enthroned Amun and the deified Ahmose-Nefertari while a man named Kha kneels in adoration in the second register. Egyptologist Marianne Eaton-Krauss suggests the stele was originally made for the Kha of TT8 and later restored and adapted by another Deir el-Medina foreman, Inherkau (whose name can be abbreviated to Kha), owner of TT299. The image of Amun, hacked out during Akhenaten's reign, was restored, and the name and titles of Inherkau's wife Henutdjuu were added in ink.

== Tomb ==
=== Discovery and clearance ===
The tomb was discovered on 15 February 1906 during excavations by the Italian Archaeological Mission headed by the Egyptologist Ernesto Schiaparelli, director of Museo Egizio. The Mission began investigating the village of Deir el-Medina in 1905 and their 1906 excavation season focused on the village necropolis. Knowing that Kha and Merit's chapel in the northern cemetery was older than the visible Twentieth Dynasty tombs in the area, Schiaparelli reasoned that Eighteenth Dynasty tombs were likely present at the base of the nearby cliffs, buried by debris from their own and later tomb construction.

He began excavations at the mouth of the valley and proceeded towards the end. More than 250 workers, divided into several gangs, excavated for four weeks, uncovering only opened and robbed tombs. In February 1906, after clearing debris along two-thirds of the valley's length, they encountered an area of clean white limestone chip 25 metres (82 ft) north of Kha and Merit's chapel. Two further days of digging uncovered an irregular opening with a set of roughly-cut descending stairs. The doorway at the base of the staircase was sealed by a plastered wall of stacked stones. The excavators suspected the burial was unrobbed as the blocking showed no evidence of resealing; a hole was made to admit the foreman Khalifa, who confirmed the tomb beyond was unviolated. Two members of Schiaparelli's team, the supervisor Benvenuto Savina and Alessandro Casati, guarded the entrance overnight.

The following morning, with the Inspector of Antiquities of Upper Egypt, Arthur Weigall, in attendance, the first wall was demolished, revealing the first of two horizontal corridors separated by a blocking wall. The second corridor contained overflow from the burial chamber, including Kha's bed with bundles of persea branches underneath, a large lamp stand, baskets, jars, baskets of fruit, a wooden stool, and a whip with Kha's name written on it. At the end of passage was a locked wooden door which Weigall recalled "seemed so modern that Professor Schiaparelli called to his servant for the key, who quite seriously replied 'I don't know where it is, sir.'" A thin saw was inserted between the two planks of wood to cut the crossbars on the back of the door, allowing entry into the burial chamber while preserving the lock.

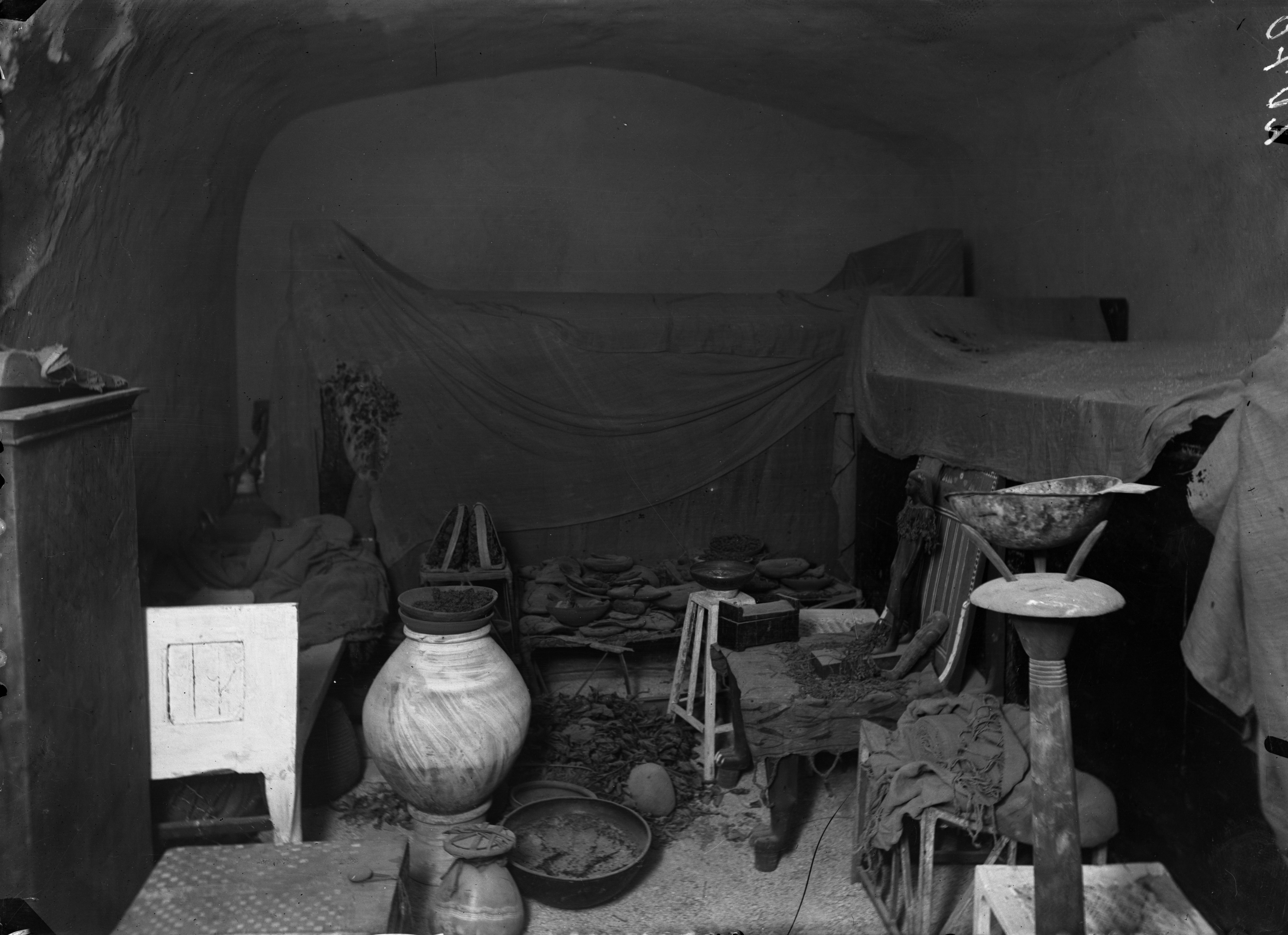
The burial chamber as discovered in February 1906

Weigall entered the burial chamber first, followed by Schiaparelli and members of his team. The room was packed with objects, carefully ordered and arranged by members of the funeral party over 3000 years earlier. The excavators were struck by how fresh and undecayed the contents looked after three millennia; Weigall in particular commented that, from the state of the items, the tomb seemed to have been closed only months before.

The tomb and its contents were recorded, photographed, and cleared in only three days, possibly due to fear of theft. A single plan drawing was made which noted the locations of 18 key objects, and several photos of the interior with artefacts in situ were taken. Schiaparelli's brother, Cesare, was a photographer and Schiaparelli's use of photography to record TT8 was not typical at the time; usually, the arrangement of the contents would be recorded in a hand-drawn plan and items would be individually photographed (if at all) only once removed from the tomb. On 18 February 1906 the contents were transferred to the tomb of Amun-her-khepeshef (QV55) in the Valley of the Queens before being shipped to Cairo and ultimately to Italy.

TT8 received limited attention until 1927, when Schiaparelli published a full account of the discovery of the tomb and a description of its contents, a year before his death. (Note: Brief descriptions of the find were published as early as March 1906. A description of the contents appeared in 1908 when the gallery displaying the objects opened. Schiaparelli himself authored two brief letters in 1906, and a very brief, partial description of the goods and their owner, Kha, in 1920.) In his 1928 review of the publication for the Journal of Egyptian Archaeology, Egyptologist Henry Hall praised the large volume for its readability and inclusion of many photographs of the artefacts, but also characterised it as "not scientifically precise". He criticised its lack of detail expected for an Egyptological publication, such as the absence of scale bars in the photos, no or poor reproduction of the hieroglyphic text, and no inventory listing all the objects. Such critiques have been echoed by modern authors. In her 2010 book on the tomb, then-director of Museo Egizio Eleni Vassilika calls Schiaparelli's treatment "uneven" and criticises the narrative's many tangents and mistakes. Among its omissions and mistakes are neglecting to mention the date of the discovery or give the dimensions of the tomb, stating that many of Kha's possessions were in a box too small for them, and that Merit's toilet box was unsealed. The publication used a blank floor plan and only three photos of the burial chamber, leading to ongoing confusion regarding the positioning of objects which are not included in the unpublished plan or seen in photographs, such as the slatted table and senet game board.

=== Architecture ===
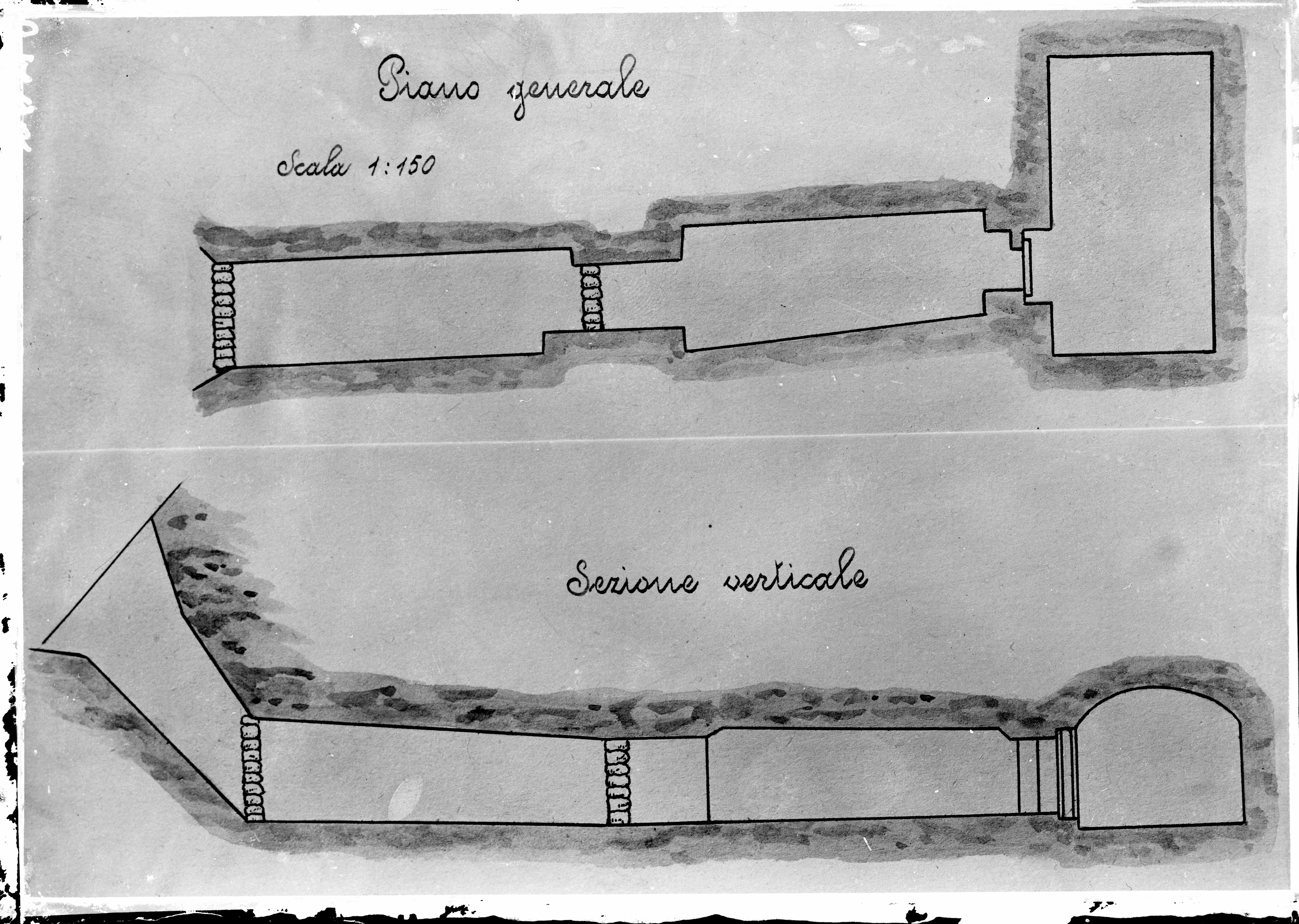
Plan and section views of the tomb of Kha and Merit, in an excavation drawing by Francesco Ballerini.

Kha and Merit's tomb was not dug in the forecourt of their funerary chapel but cut into the base of the cliffs 25 metres (82 ft) away. It is one of only a few tombs in Deir el-Medina to exhibit this separation. It likely contributed to the tomb escaping the attention of robbers, as did its position at the base of the cliffs, which allowed the entrance to be covered by debris from landslides and later tombs cut above.

The tomb is entered via a 4 m (13 ft) deep shaft and a staircase that descends to a depth of 8.50 m (27.9 ft), followed by two straight corridors with a total length of 13.40 m (44.0 ft). Walls of stacked stones divided the corridor from the stairs and the corridors from each other. The first corridor is long, low and roughly cut. The second is shorter but higher and wider; this part is sometimes referred to as the antechamber because it stored objects that did not fit in the burial chamber. At the end is a single burial chamber set at a right angle to the axis. The room measures 5.6 m × 3.4 m (18 ft × 11 ft) with a 2.9 m (9.5 ft) high barrel-vaulted ceiling. The walls were smoothed, plastered, and painted yellow but otherwise undecorated.

=== Contents ===
The tomb of Kha and Merit was discovered entirely unrobbed, with a funerary assemblage of over 500 objects. (Note: The number of items in the tomb is variously given as over 460, 500 or over 500. This discrepancy is due to the find being registered on 460 accession numbers with instances of more than one object being assigned to one number.) It is a rare example of an intact non-noble burial from the height of the Eighteenth Dynasty, and is the best provisioned of any similar tomb known from Egypt. The majority of the objects were used by Kha and Merit in life, such as clothing and furniture. Clothing was laundered and neatly folded in baskets or chests, and some furniture was given a fresh coat of paint. Other pieces were made to be placed in the tomb, having painted decoration in imitation of expensive inlay work and hieroglyphic texts that are often full of grammatical errors. The various boxes and chests were labelled for the use of either Kha or Merit with brief inscriptions in ink. Different kinds of breads, meats, vegetables, fruits and wine were provided for the deceased to eat in the afterlife. Despite the large number of items within the tomb, they were carefully laid out in an orderly fashion. The quality and quantity of objects is assumed to be typical of an upper-middle-class burial. Although less richly outfitted than noble or royal burials, it provides a more complete picture of the variety of food, clothing, and personal objects expected in burials during the mid-Eighteenth Dynasty. Since 2017, the tomb's contents have been the subject of the "TT8 Project", a multidisciplinary and non-invasive study of the objects.

==== Personal possessions ====
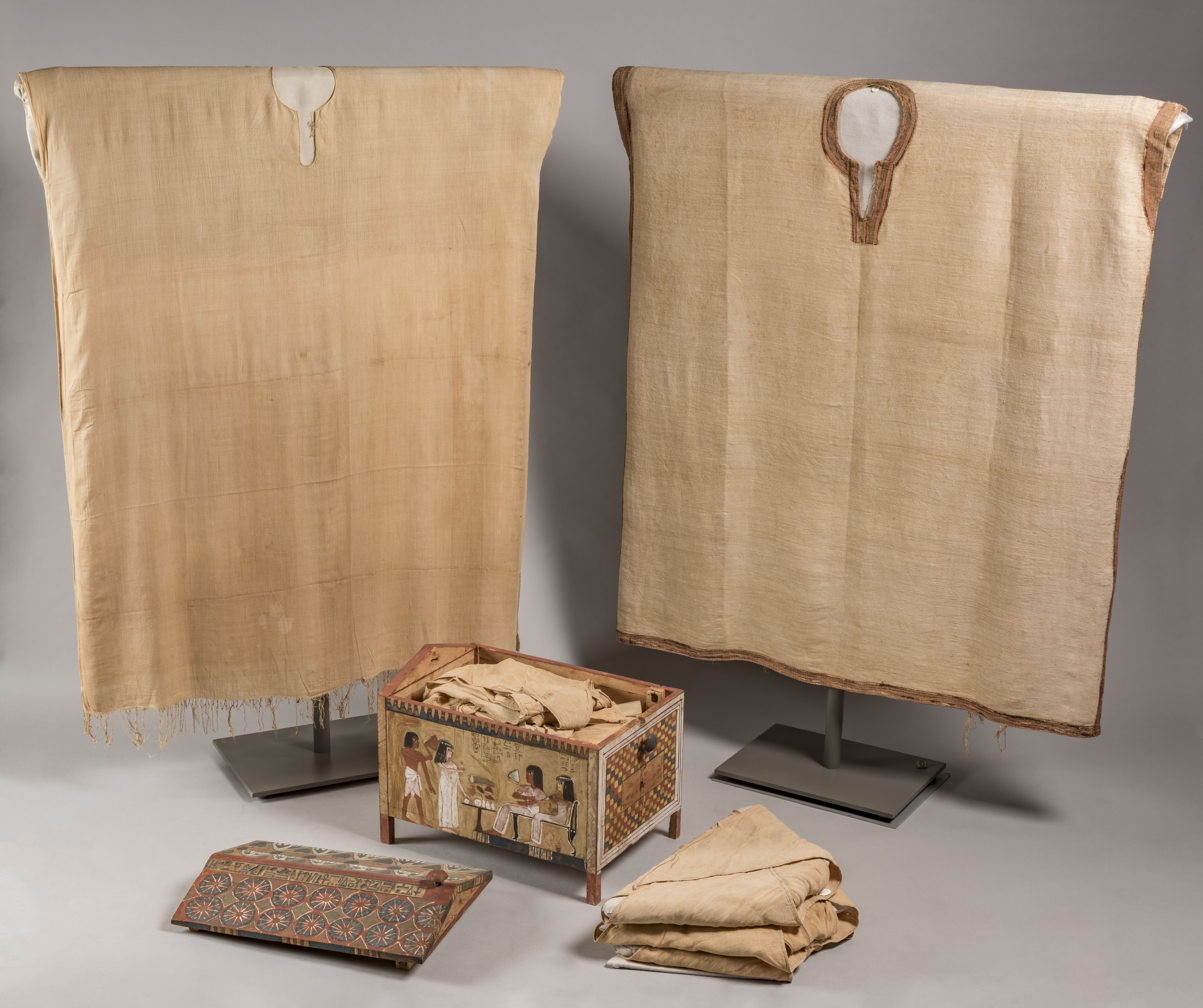
Tunics and a clothing chest of Kha

The personal items belonging to the couple were found neatly stored in various boxes, chests, and baskets. Kha's personal possessions make up the bulk of the objects, with some 196 items inscribed for him. These included work tools such as a rare folding wooden cubit rod which is 527.6 millimetres (20.77 in) long when extended and kept in its own leather pouch, scribal palettes, a drill, chisel, an adze, and an empty case designed to hold the bar and pans of a weighing scale. Among his cosmetics were bronze razors in a leather bag, a comb, and tubes of kohl. Also present were items for preparing and serving drinks, including a funnel, two metal strainers, a silver jar, and faience bowls. His clothing, marked with his monogram, was stored in several boxes and a bag. All were made of linen and consisted of 59 loincloths and 19 tunics, and further rectangular pieces of fabric, identified by Schiaparelli as four shawls and 26 sashes or kilts; seven of these were knotted together with loincloths to form sets of clothing. Other objects belonging to Kha were distributed around the tomb, such as four sticks (two with decorative bark inlay), and a traveling mat, folded on a net of doum palm nuts.

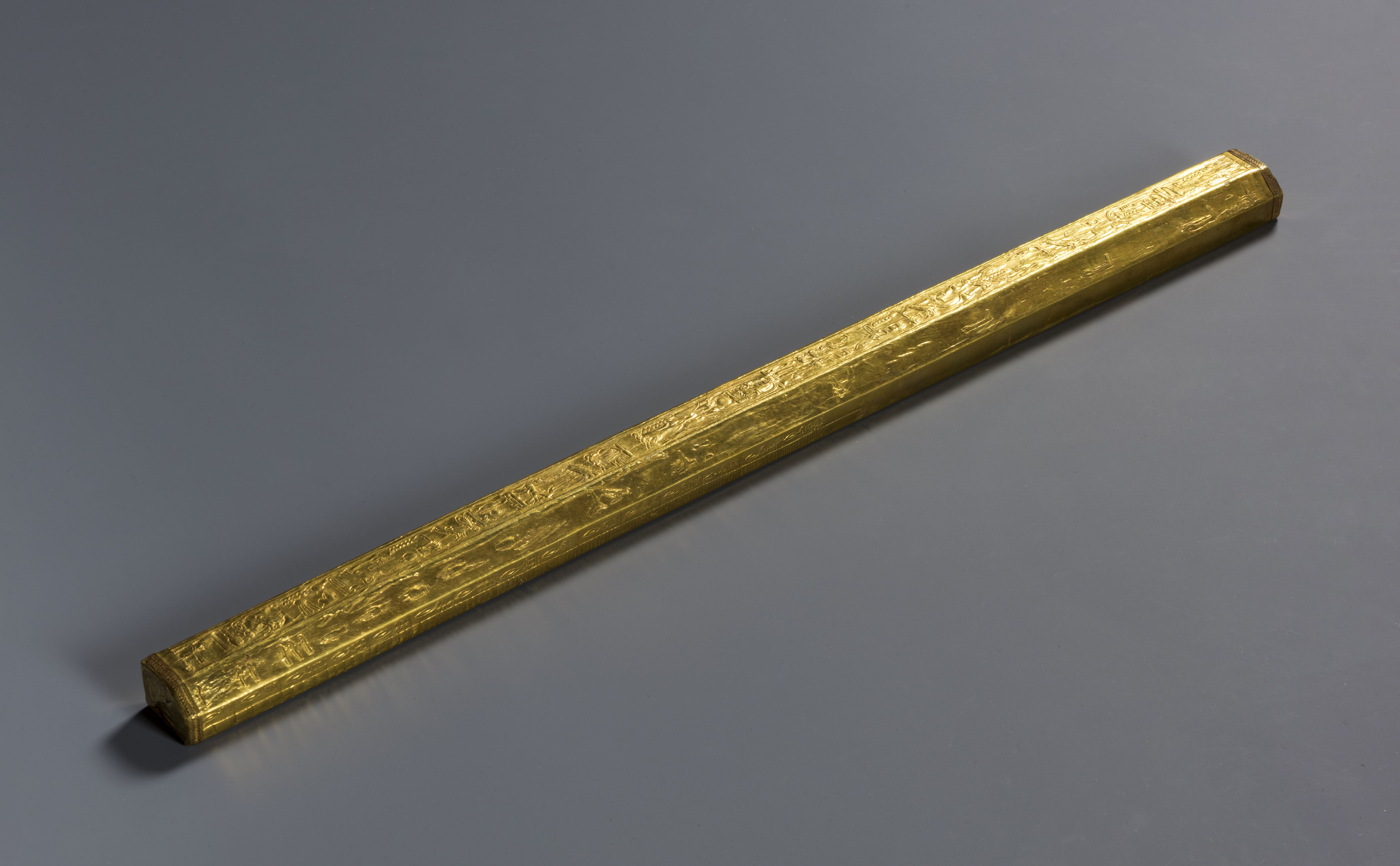
Royal cubit rod of Kha, bearing the names of Amenhotep II, wood covered in gold leaf

Several items within the tomb were gifts to Kha from others. A cubit rod covered entirely in gold leaf and bearing the cartouches of Amenhotep II was an award from that king, although Kha's name does not appear on it. Another royal gift was a large dish with the throne name of Amenhotep III inscribed on the handle. Likely produced in the royal workshops, it was given to Kha as part of a royal award. A large metal situla bears the name and titles of Userhat, a priest of the royal funerary cults of Mutnofret, a wife of Thutmose I, and Sitamun, in this case most likely referring to the daughter of Ahmose I. He worked on the western bank of Thebes, presumably the Deir el-Medina area, and the gift was in recognition of Kha's high status at the height of his career. One of Kha's two scribal palettes belonged to Amenmes, a high official of the reign of Thutmose IV who was buried in TT118. He was "overseer of all of the construction works of the king", meaning he possibly worked with Kha. One stick was a gift from Neferhebef, with a dedicatory inscription recording that it was made by him, presumably for Kha, but the space where Kha's name would be inserted was left blank. Another stick belonged to Khaemwaset, who probably worked alongside Kha as he too bears the title "chief of the Great Place". Kha's senet board belonged to Benermeret, a member of the cult of Amun at Karnak temple, who had it inscribed and decorated for his parents Neferhebef and Taiunes. The board is double-sided, with grids for senet and the Game of Twenty, and has a locking drawer for storing the gaming pieces and knucklebone-shaped dice (astragals).

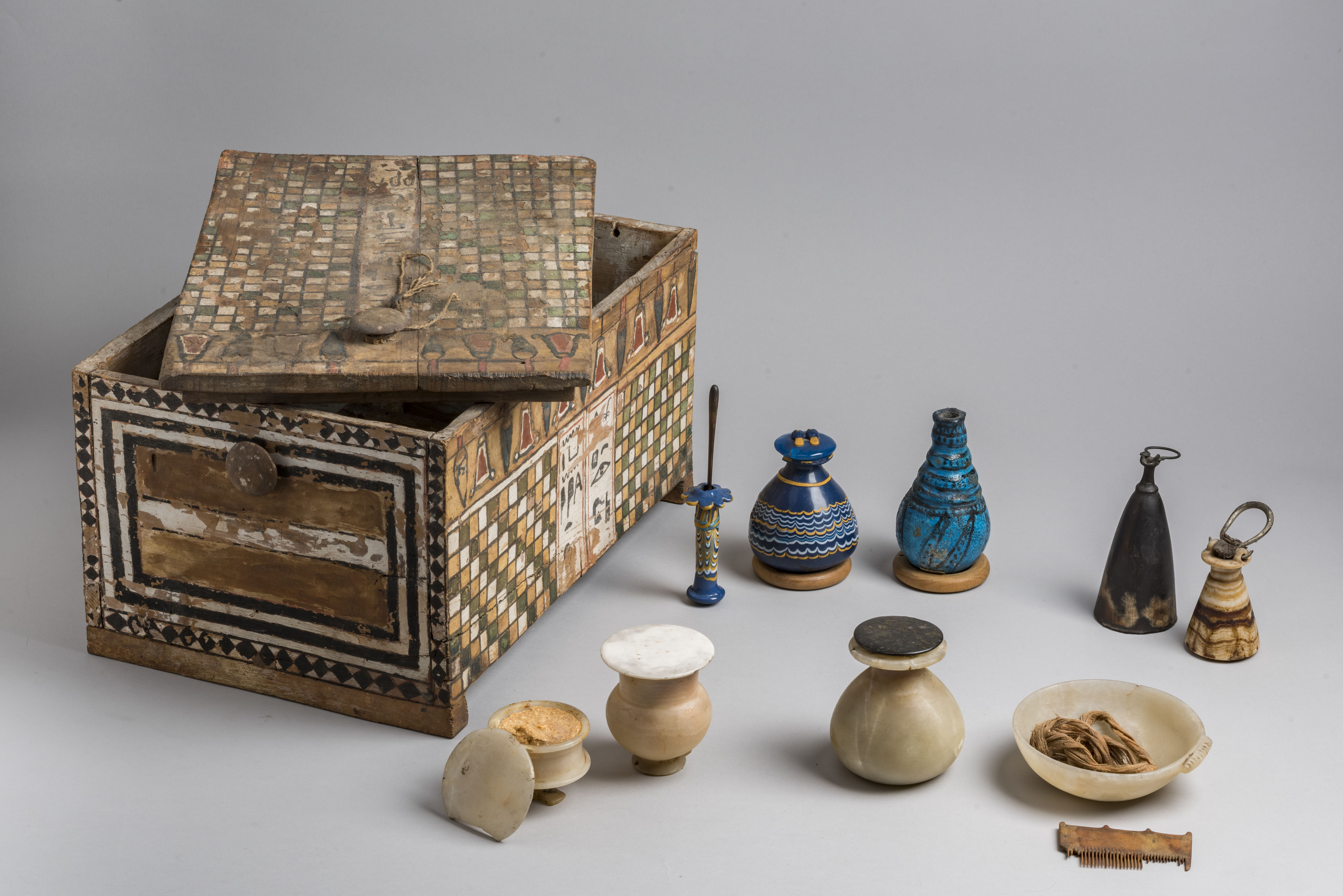
Merit's toilet box and vessels containing various cosmetics

Merit's personal possessions were much fewer than Kha's, and were placed beside her bed, near the door. Egyptologist Lynn Meskell considers this difference in the quantity of items to be a reflection of the inequality between the sexes at the elite level of ancient Egyptian society. A large wooden cabinet, 1.10 metres (3.6 ft) tall, contained her wig which Schiaparelli said "still shines with the perfumed oils that were applied to it". It is one of the best surviving examples from ancient Egypt and represents the "enveloping" style of wig common during the Eighteenth and early Nineteenth Dynasties. It is made of locks of human hair styled into tight waves ending in tiny ringlets. At the back, the wig forms three large plaits. It would not have been thick enough to entirely cover Merit's own hair when worn and would have been an addition to her own styled hair. Investigation using gas chromatography-mass spectrometry indicated the presence of plant oils and "balsam". As no fixative such as resin is present on the wig, it is suggested it was styled by braiding when wet to give a crimped effect, and that the oils mentioned by Schiaparelli were meant to keep the hair soft. Two smaller baskets contained personal effects such as needles, a razor, bone hairpins, combs, spare braids of hair, a tool possibly used to curl hair or wigs, and dried raisins. Schiaparelli considered a large sheet, stained with oil but carefully stored, to be Merit's dressing gown. Merit's cosmetics were stored inside a box with funerary inscriptions and decorated in imitation of inlay, likely painted especially for the funeral. They consisted of a wooden comb and vessels of alabaster and faience holding ointments and oils; two objects, a small jar for oils and a kohl tube, were made of multi-coloured glass, a relatively rare material at the time.

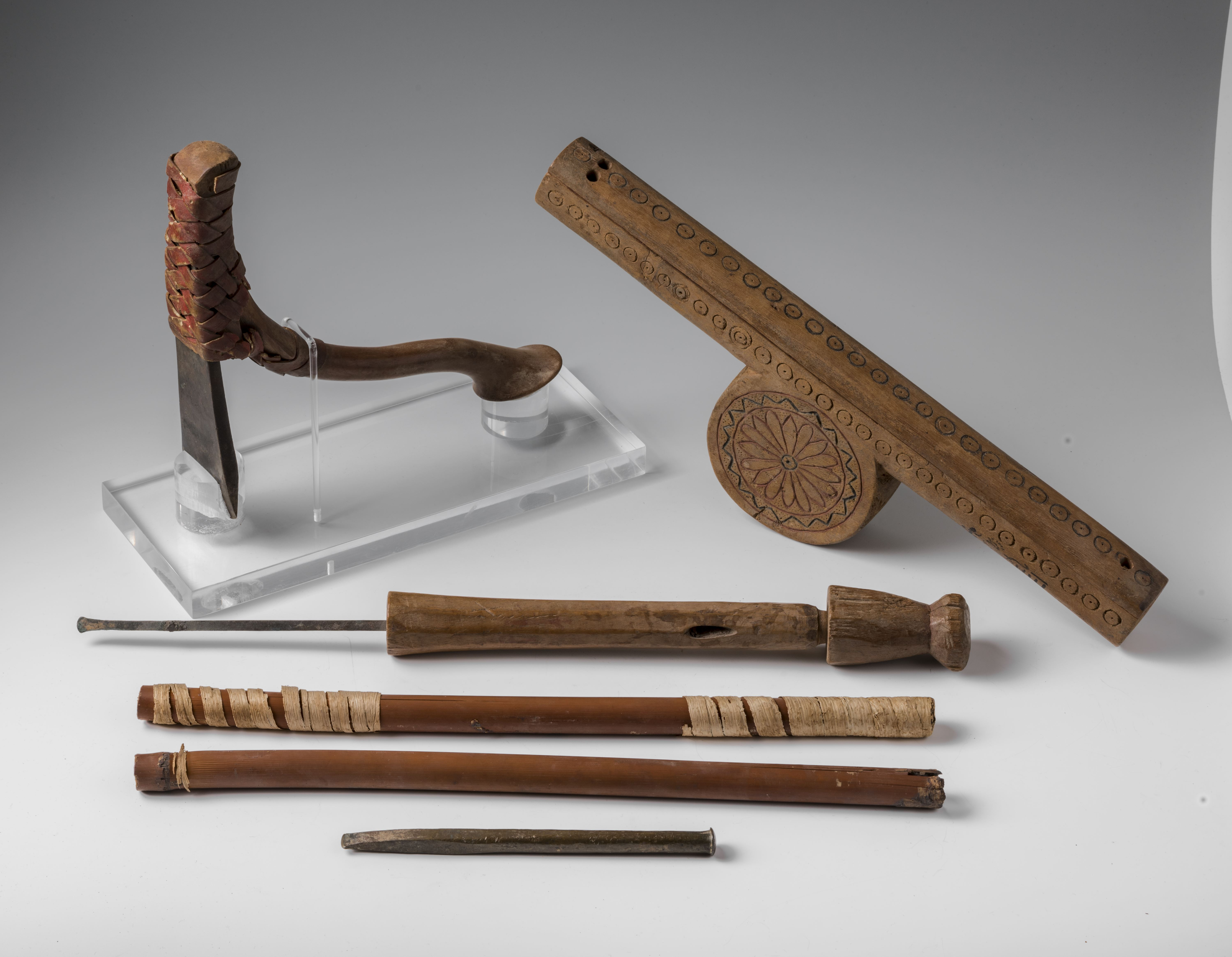
A selection of Kha's work tools, including an adze with his monogram incised on the blade, a chisel, and a wooden case for a scale

Kha's folding cubit rod with leather case

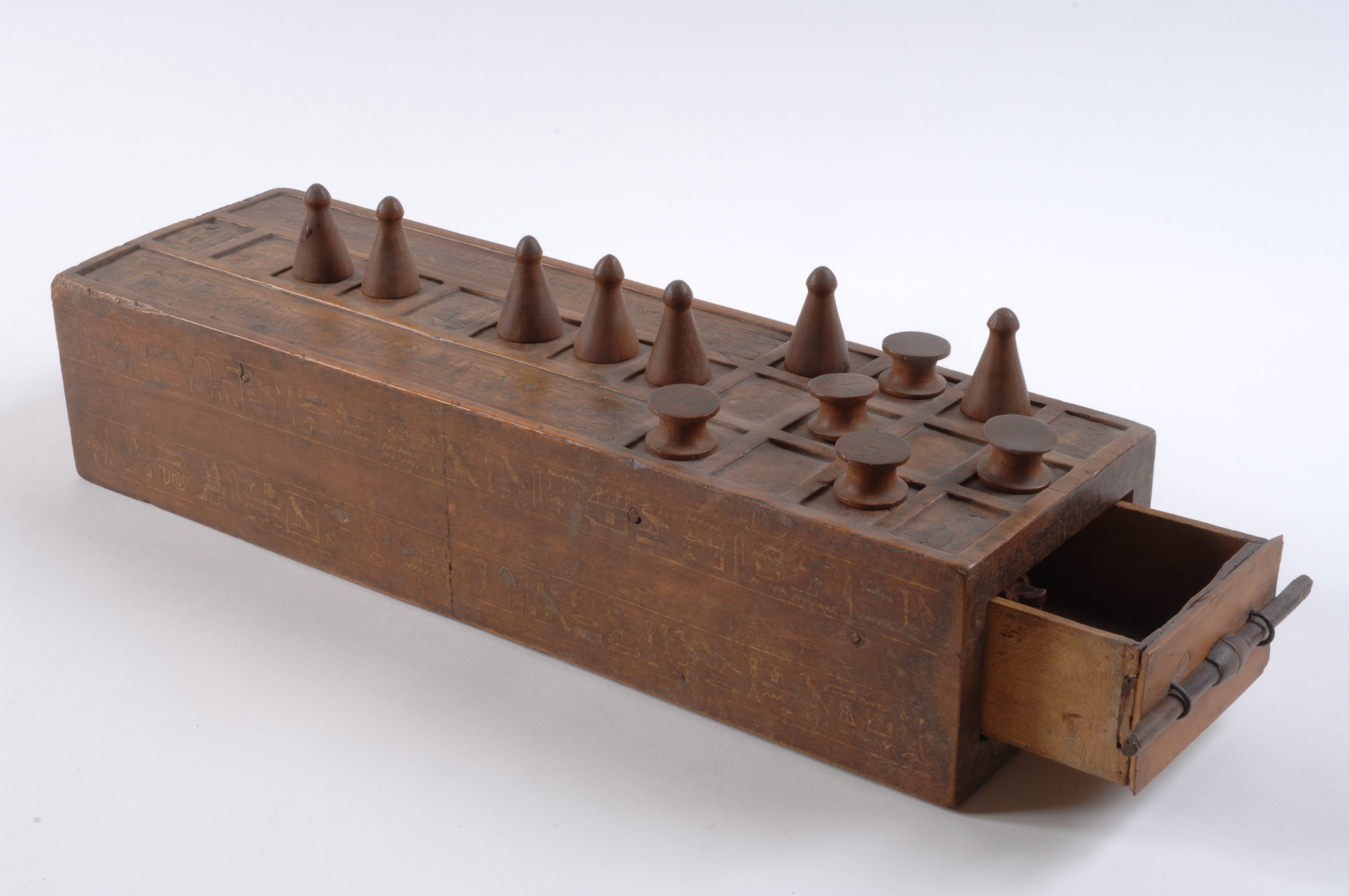
Kha's senet board, originally made for Neferhebef

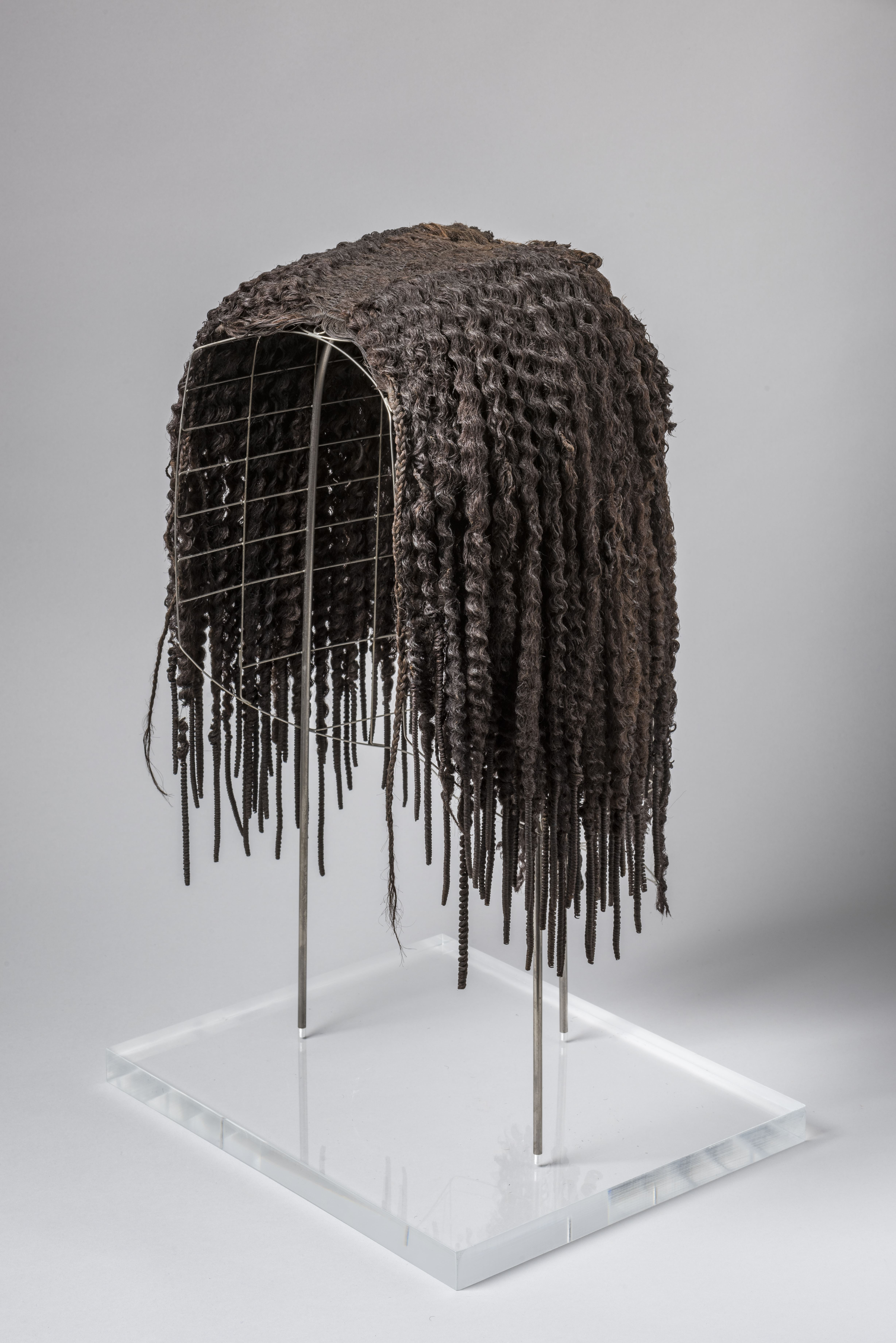
Merit's wig

==== Furniture and furnishings ====
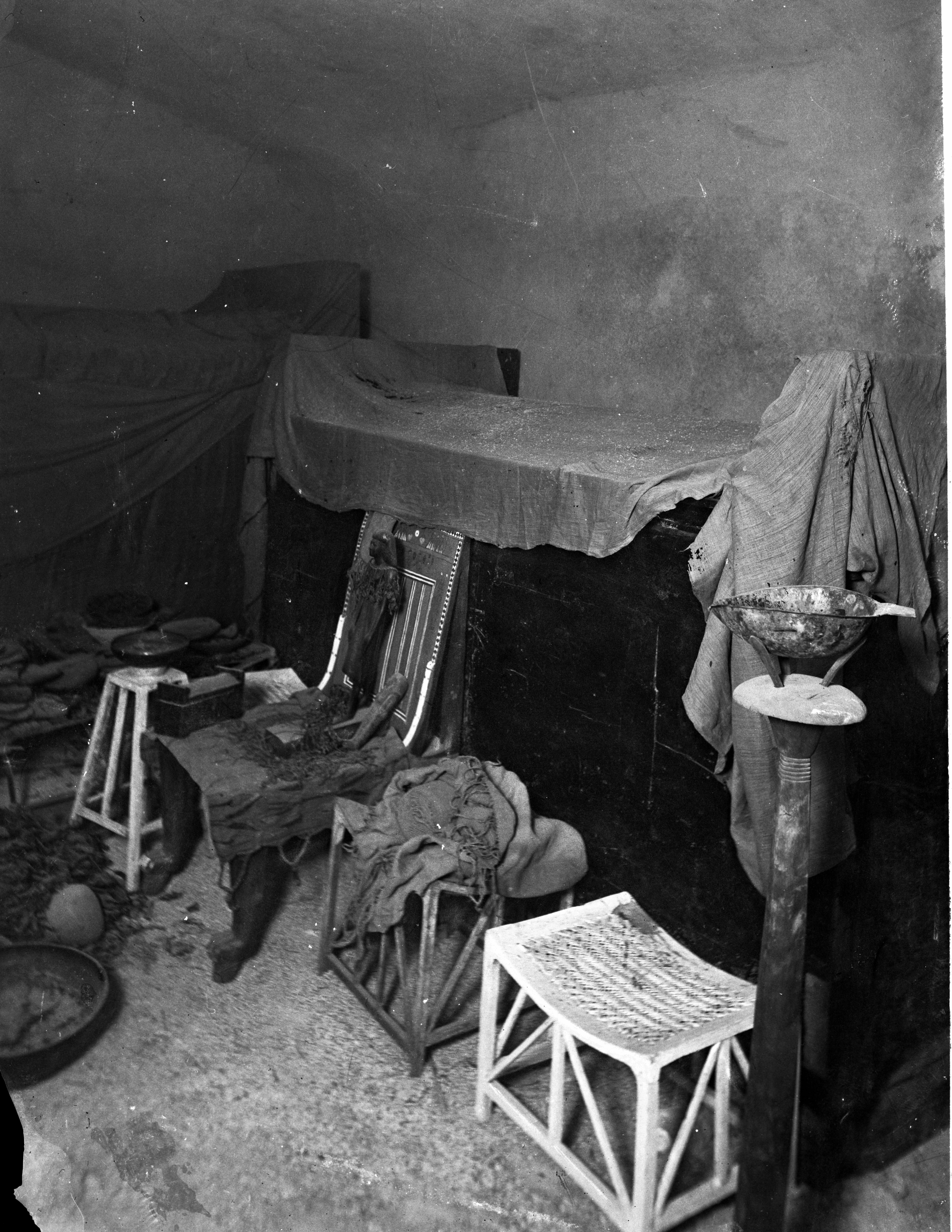
View of the burial chamber showing the carefully arranged contents, including the chair, stools, and lampstand in front of the sarcophagi. Photo by Francesco Ballerini, 1906.

The tomb contained many items of everyday furniture sourced from Kha and Merit's house in Deir el-Medina. (Note: Kha and Merit are presumed to have lived in Deir el-Medina. No house can be definitely assigned to them. Vassilika and Russo consider the possibility that they lived temporarily in the village during work periods and had a separate residence elsewhere, based on the large quantity of furniture and the small house sizes in the workmen's village.) The largest pieces of furniture belonging to the couple were their beds, each with a strung cord mattress. Kha's bed was placed in the corridor outside the burial chamber owing to lack of space within the room. Merit's was made up with sheets, blankets, and two headrests, one of which was entirely wrapped in fabric. A footrest inscribed for Kha was associated with her bed.

At least ten wooden stools of various forms were placed in the burial chamber; the majority were painted white and most had woven seats. The most unusual example was a folding stool with a leather seat and legs ending in duck heads inlaid with ivory. A further wooden stool with a central cut-out was found in the antechamber; it is thought to be a toilet seat or commode, the only example of its type known from ancient Egypt. There was only a single high-backed chair, on which was placed a statuette of Kha. It may have been a purely funerary piece, as it lacks wear on the strung seat and uses paint instead of costly inlay; alternatively, it may have been used plain and decorated for the tomb.

The tables were largely simple constructions, with three specifically funerary examples made of cane or reed and papyrus. A single small table had more elaborate construction, being made of wooden slats in imitation of canework; it held Kha's senet box when found, which may have been its usual purpose. Thirteen chests of varying sizes and styles made up the rest of the furniture placed within the tomb. All were of wood, and largely plain or white-washed. Five were probably made especially for the tomb, painted in imitation of inlay; of these, three bore scenes of Kha and Merit receiving offerings from their children. The two wooden lamp stands are the only examples of their kind from ancient Egypt. They are made in the shape of papyrus stalks with open umbels and approximately 1.5 metres (4.9 ft) tall. Only the example found inside the burial chamber had a bronze lamp, variously identified as having the shape of a leaf, bird, or bulti-fish; it was found half-full of fat with a burnt wick.

Folding stool with leather seat and legs ending in carved duck heads

Merit's bed, around which many of her personal belongings were found

One of the wooden boxes with painted decoration in imitation of inlay

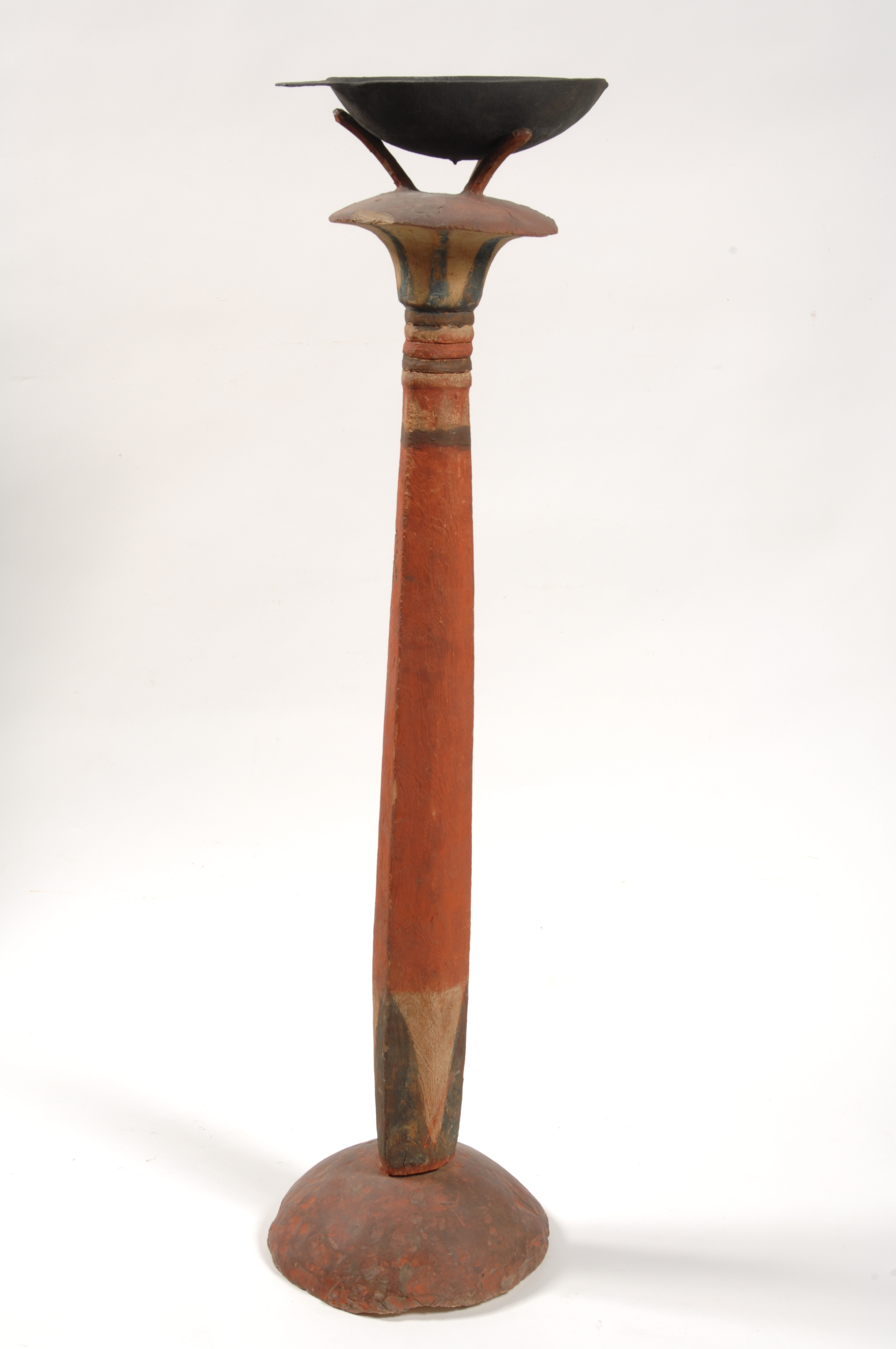
Replica of the papyrus-shaped lampstand and lamp from the burial chamber

==== Food and drink ====
Baskets of herbs such as cumin were found alongside doum palm fruit and loaves of flatbread

The tomb was stocked with numerous foodstuffs which were piled on tables and in bowls, packed in amphorae, and stored in baskets. The most numerous category was bread which Schiaparelli said was of "a more varied and plentiful assortment than has been discovered in any other tomb or exists in any museum". The bulk of the loaves were arranged on the low tables or packed within a large ceramic vessel. Most were of the standard round flat form but others were made into various shapes such as triangles, jars or trussed animals. Some have grooves or holes that may suggest fertility.

Wine was also well represented, the containers for which were labelled with their year and place of origin. Most were sealed but those that were open evaporated over the millennia, leaving only a residue. Chunks of meat and roasted birds were stored salted in amphorae while salted fish were placed in bowls among the bread. Vegetable dishes consisted of minced and seasoned greens in bowls and jars accompanied by bundles of garlic and onions, and baskets of cumin seeds. Fruits included grapes, dates, figs, and nets of doum palm nuts. Imported species were represented by a box of almonds (mixed with domestically-grown tiger nuts) and a basket of juniper berries. Thirteen sealed alabaster vessels contained oils, seven of which Schiaparelli identified as the "seven sacred oils" used in funerary ritual. Also included was oil and salt for cooking and the fuel needed for the kitchen fire, in the form of dried cow dung.

Few of the sealed vessels were opened by Schiaparelli so the contents of over 40 sealed (and unsealed) containers have been investigated using non-invasive techniques such as X-ray fluorescence (XRF), transmission electron microscopy (TEM), energy-dispersive X-ray spectroscopy (EDS), types of mass spectrometry (MS), and neutron and gamma imaging techniques including neutron imaging which identified the presence of plant oils, animal fats, beeswax, flour, and other organic compounds.

Carob fruit secured to a tall stand with papyrus strips

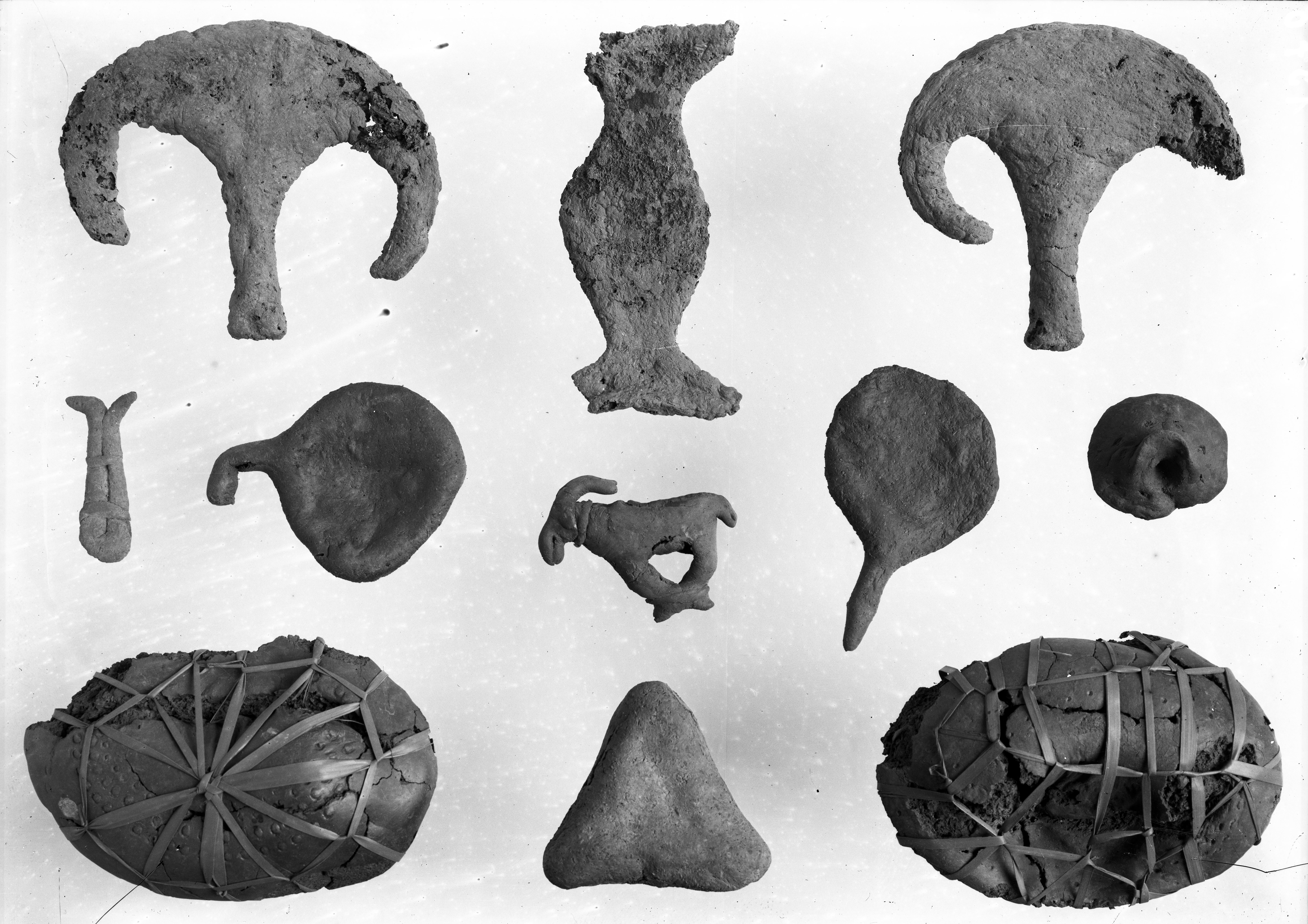
Various forms of bread, including one shaped like a trussed gazelle

An opened and broken amphora containing salted birds

Sealed and unsealed painted amphorae and jugs that contained liquids

=== Sarcophagi and coffins ===
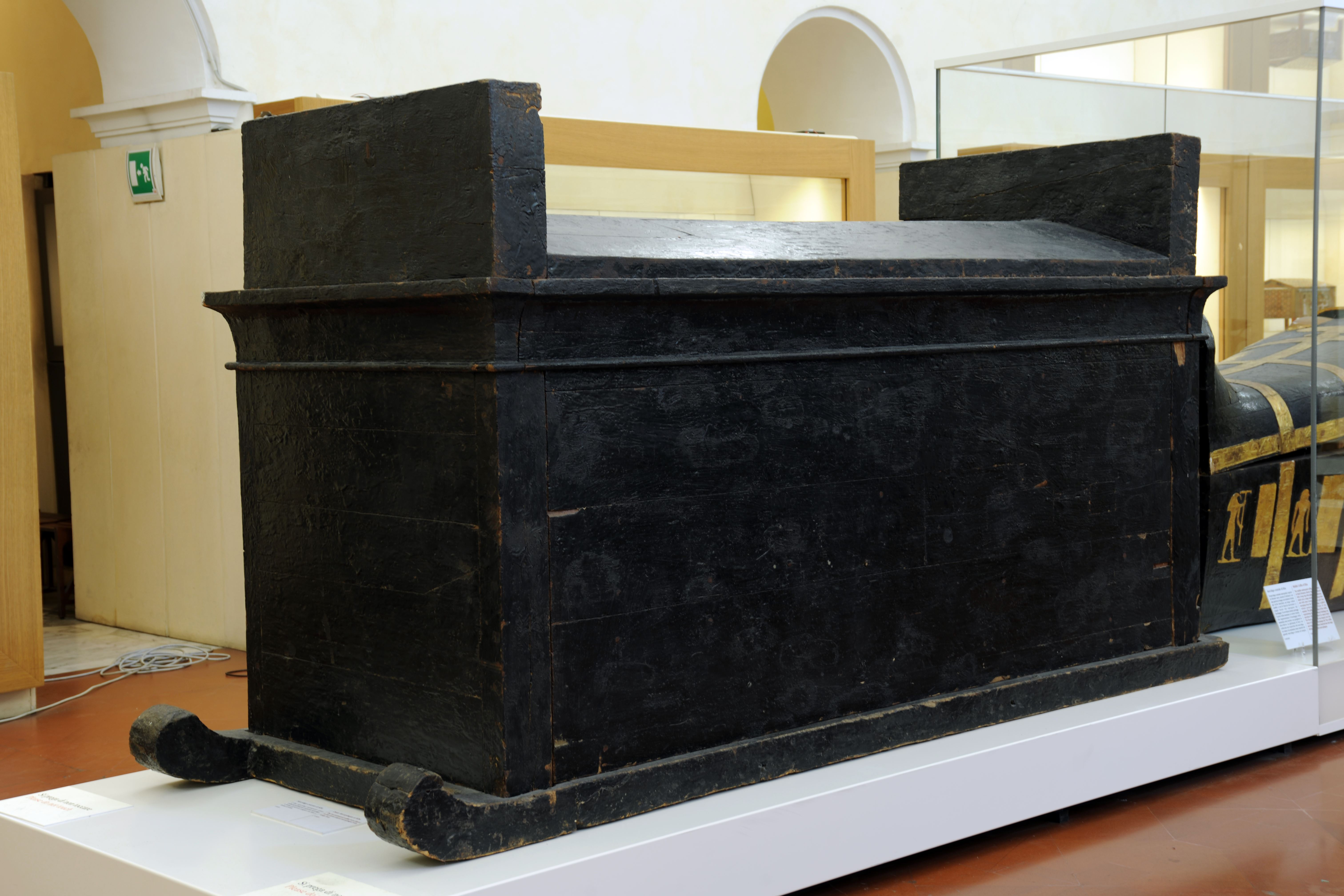
The large sarcophagus or outer coffin of Kha

The largest items within the tomb were the two outer coffins or sarcophagi containing the coffins and mummies of Kha and Merit. Kha's was placed against the far wall, with Merit's positioned at a right angle to it against the long wall. Both were covered by large linen sheets, with the fabric covering Kha's being approximately 15 metres (49 ft) long and 2 metres (6.6 ft) wide. The two sarcophagi are nearly identical in form, both being shaped like the shrine of Lower Egypt, with cavetto cornices and vaulted lids with uprights at each end. They differ in size, with Kha's being larger at 300 centimetres (9.8 ft) long, to Merit's 228.5 centimetres (7.50 ft), and base style as Kha's has sledge runners and Merit's does not. Both are made of black-painted sycamore wood without any additional decoration. Referred to as "bitumen" in Schiaparelli's publication, the black coating is made mainly of Pistacia resin and small amounts of other plant-derived products. Similar sarcophagi with gilded or painted text and figures were used by contemporary nobles and royalty, as evidenced from the tombs of nobles in the Valley of the Kings and Schiaparelli's excavations in the Valley of the Queens. Due to their large size, they were brought into the tomb in sections and reassembled; marks made on the edges of each piece assisted in this task.

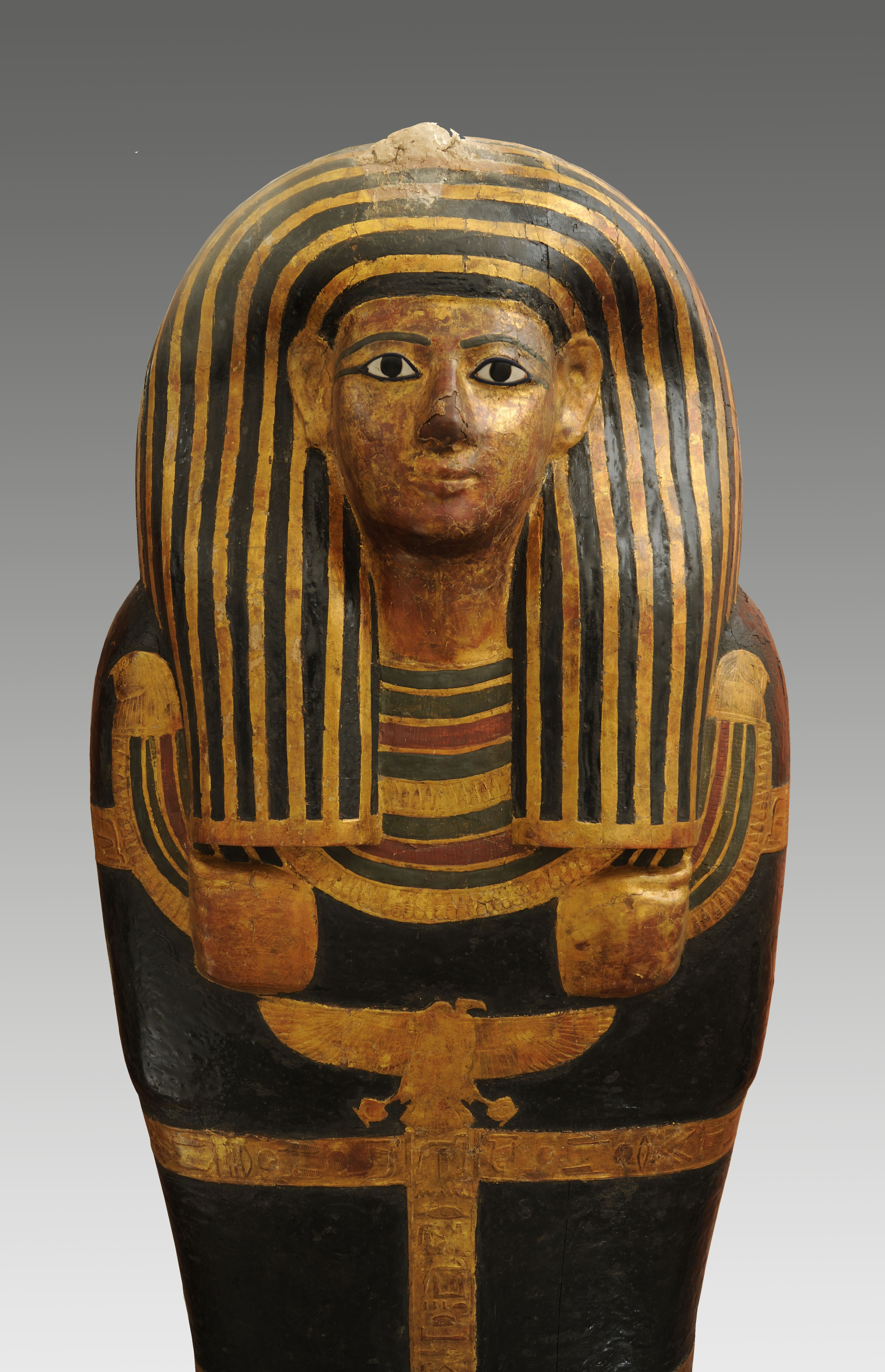
Portrait of the middle or outer mummiform coffin of Kha

Kha's sarcophagus contained a further set of two nested coffins. Both are mummiform, depicting the deceased as a wrapped mummy wearing a long wig and broad collar with the arms crossed on the chest and the hands in fists. Below the collar and hands, a vulture goddess (identified as Nekhbet or Nut) spreads her wings over the torso. The coffin has vertical and horizontal bands of text whose positions, at centre front and sides, bicep, hip, knee, and ankle, are similar to those of the plain fabric bindings on mummy wrappings. The outer coffin has a black-based design, with the striped wig, face and hands, collar, bands of text and figures of gods picked out in gilding; the eyes are inlaid in coloured glass. The goddess Nephthys is depicted on top of the head of the coffin and Isis is depicted under the feet. A small mound of wax, possibly beeswax, was placed on the crown of the head. When revealed, the coffin was covered almost entirely by Kha's copy of the Book of the Dead. Underneath, the neck of the coffin was draped with two garlands made of melilot leaves, cornflowers, and lotus petals.

The innermost coffin has a similar design to the outer but is entirely gilded. Both the eyes and eyebrows are inlaid with stone or glass, with blue glass for the eyebrows and cosmetic lines, set in bronze or copper sockets. The interior is painted black. Another floral garland was placed across the chest of this coffin. The red-dyed flax ropes used to lower the inner coffin into the outer were still in place around the ankles and neck. Additionally, the inner coffin sat on a layer of natron inside the outer coffin. The lids of the coffins were closed with small wooden dowels. Egyptologist Arielle Kozloff considers Kha's coffins to be "superb examples" of the wealth and craftsmanship seen during the reign of Amenhotep III. Their style and workmanship suggests they were made in a royal workshop.

Side view of the coffin of Merit showing the gilded lid and black-based trough

Merit's sarcophagus contained only a single coffin wrapped in a linen shroud. The coffin was not made for her; it is much too large for her mummy and the inscriptions only name Kha. Merit's coffin combines features of Kha's outer and inner coffins, with the lid being entirely gilded and the trough having a black-based design. The discrepancy in design represents a merging of the typical two-coffin set into one. Her coffin is of lesser quality than Kha's and is less costly; the sculpting of the face is rougher, the figures of deities are roughly rendered, and the text is incised instead of being modelled in plaster. The difference in quality may be due to this coffin being commissioned by Kha earlier in his career, before he could afford a more expensive two-coffin set. A large figure of the goddess Nut is painted on the interior of the coffin trough. Merit probably died unexpectedly, resulting in a coffin made for her husband being used for her burial.

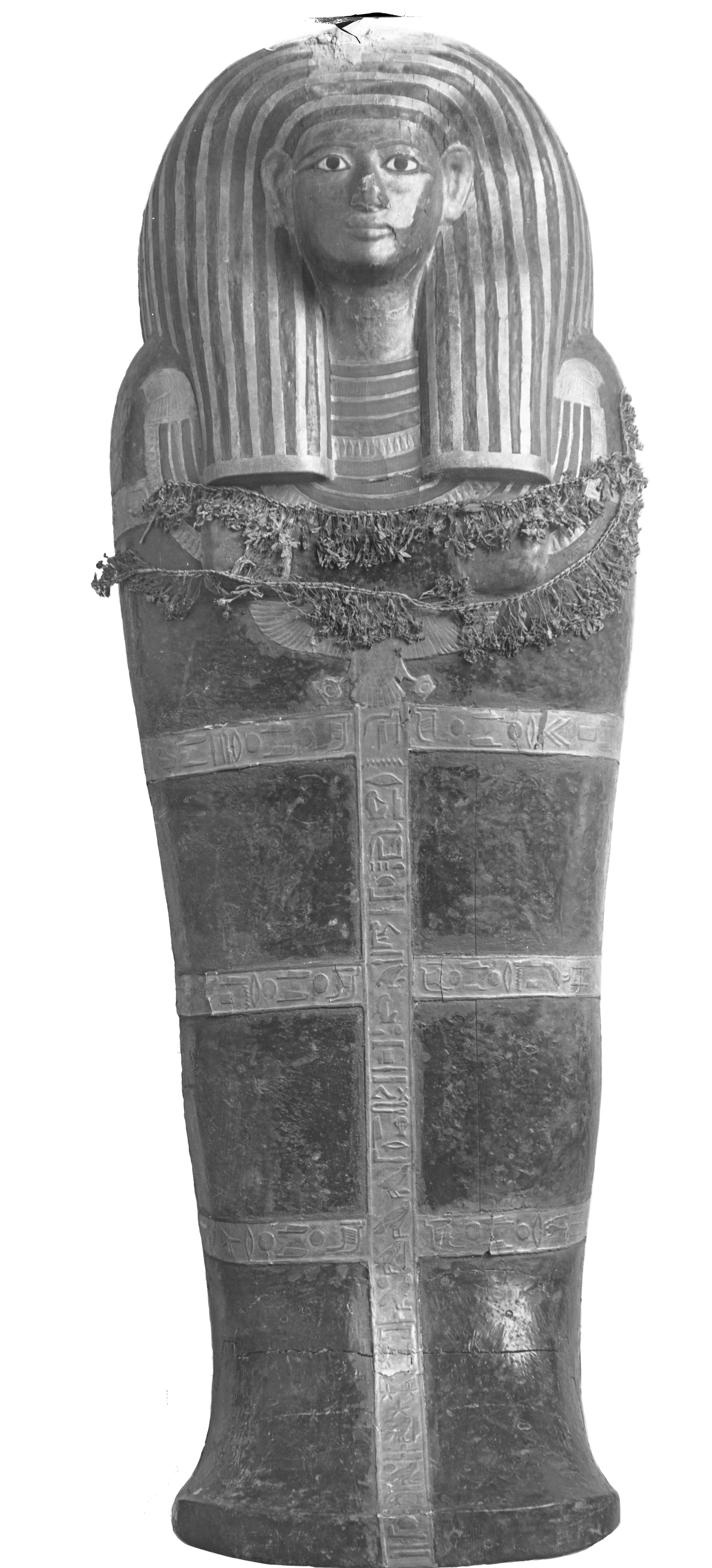
The outer mummiform or middle coffin of Kha with floral garlands across the chest

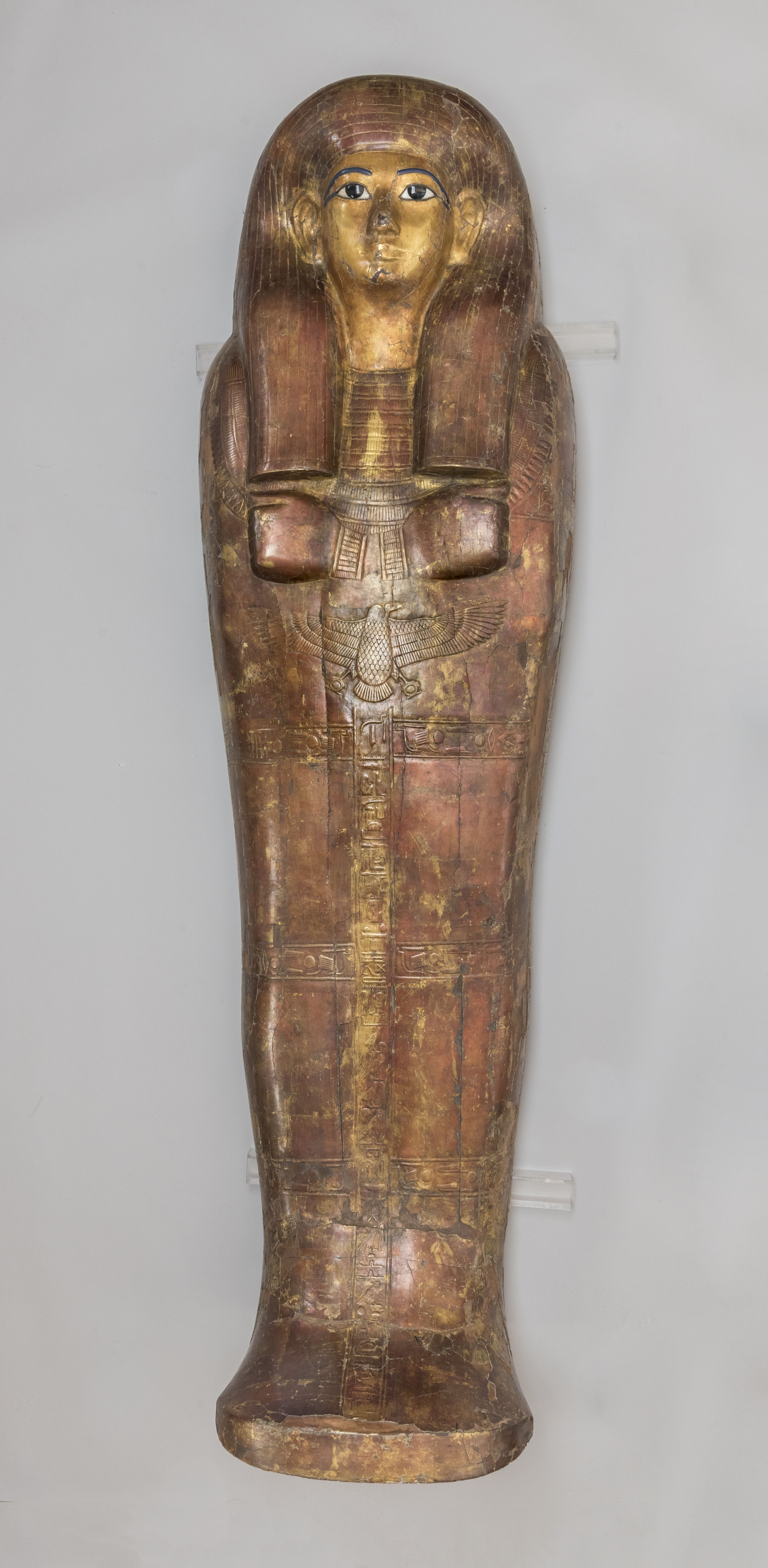
Inner coffin of Kha

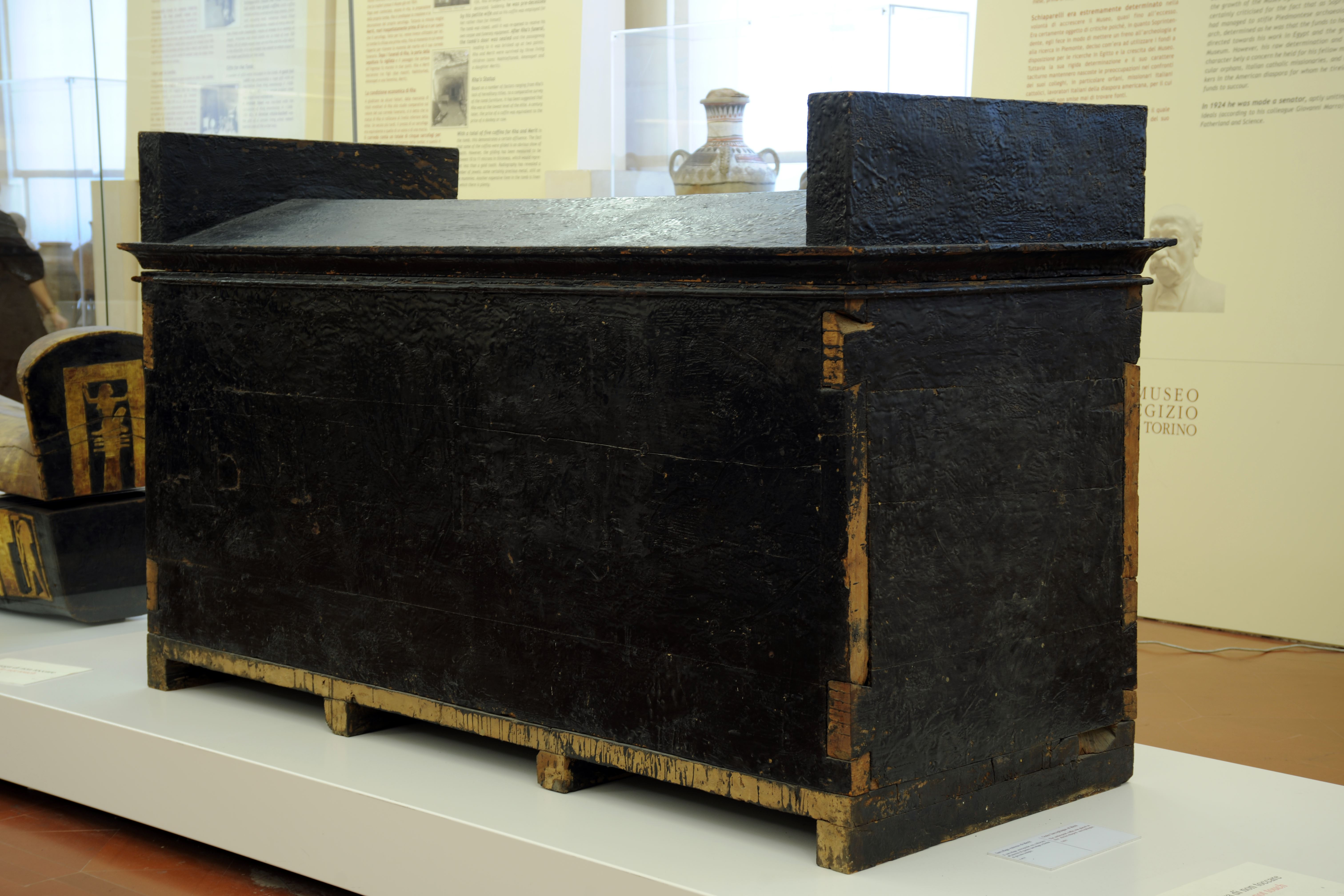
Outer coffin or sarcophagus of Merit

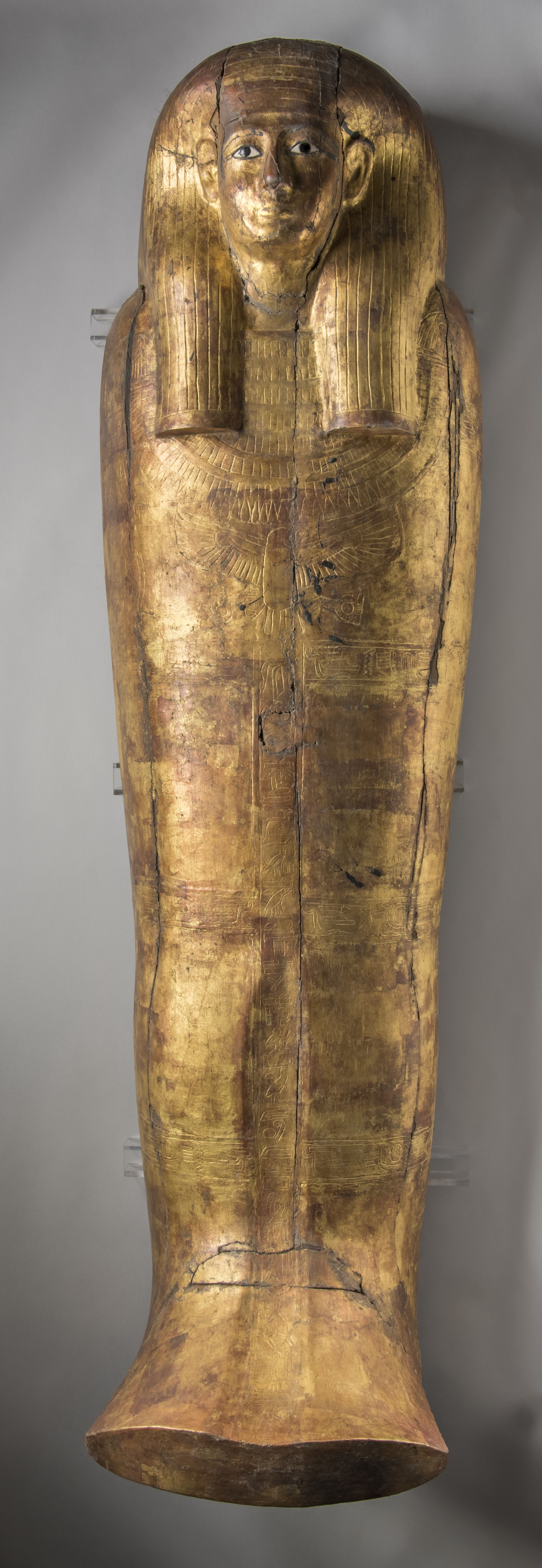
Merit's inner coffin has similar decoration to Kha's but lacks hands

=== Mummies ===
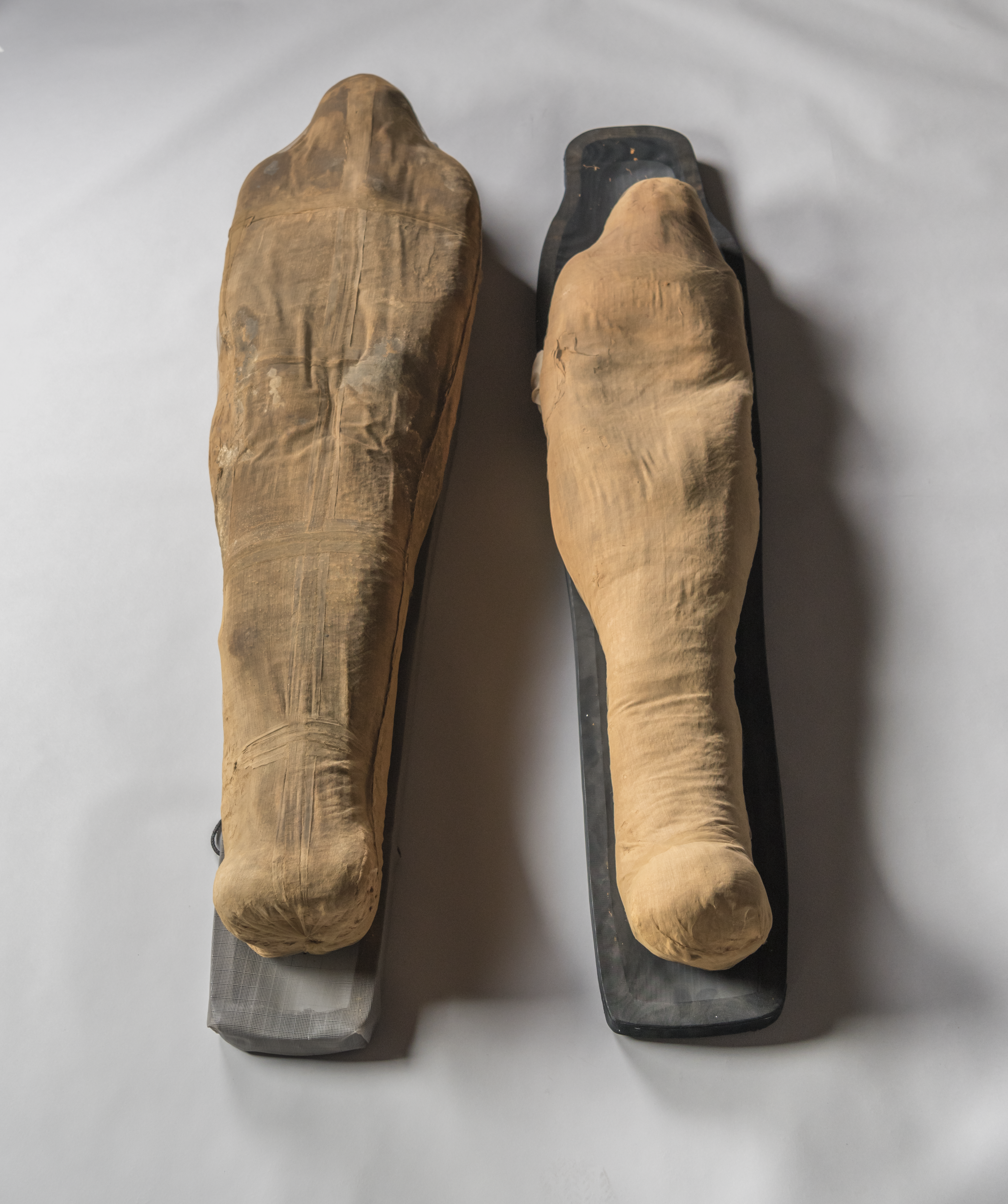
The wrapped mummies of Kha (left) and Merit (right)

The wrapped mummies of Kha and Merit were found undisturbed within their coffins. Schiaparelli decided against unwrapping them, so the pair have been investigated with non-invasive methods. They were X-rayed in 1966 and 2014, and CT scanned in 2002 at the Institute of Radiology in Turin and again in 2016. Neither had undergone a mummification procedure typical for the Eighteenth Dynasty; their internal organs were not removed, explaining the absence of canopic jars. The lack of organ removal has led to suggestions that the bodies were treated using a shorter procedure, with little care, or that they were not embalmed at all despite their status. However, their organs, including their eyes and optic nerves, are excellently preserved. Chemical analysis of samples of their mummy wrappings indicate that they were both treated with an embalming recipe. Kha's consists of a mix of animal fat or plant oil and plant-derived extracts, gums, and conifer resin. Merit's is different, consisting of fish oil mixed with plant extracts, gums, resin, and beeswax; similar results, with the addition of Pistacia resin, were obtained from a sample of the red shroud that covered her mummy within the coffin. Both of these embalming recipes were made of costly ingredients that were hard to obtain, some of which were imported into Egypt, and would have had effective anti-bacterial and insecticidal properties. Natron, the main desiccating agent used in mummification, was also used within Kha's coffin and appears as white spots on the surface of Merit's wrappings. This study indicates that, contrary to previous opinions, their bodies were indeed embalmed, at significant effort and cost. That the methods used for them differ from the royal mummification method is not surprising, given the difference in status and the economics of Deir el-Medina; Bianucci and co-authors suggest that few in Deir el-Medina would have been mummified in the typical (royal) fashion.

==== Kha ====
The mummy of Kha is wrapped in many layers of linen and covered with a linen shroud. The shroud is secured by a double layer of linen bandages running down the centre of the body. This is crossed by four narrow bands at the shoulders, hips, knees, and ankles. Restoration work carried out in the 2000s used a nylon net to consolidate the outer layers of linen, weakened by a previous fungal attack. Kha's mummy was not fitted with a funerary mask. It is thought he donated his mask to Merit but the reason that he did not have another made for his own burial is unknown. His wrapped mummy is 168 centimetres (5.51 ft) tall. He lies on his back with his arms extended; his hands are placed over the pubic area.

Kha likely died in his 60s, with an estimated height in life of 171 or 172 centimetres (5.64 ft) and a robust build. His health is consistent with his age at the time of his death. His teeth were in poor condition, with many tooth losses and much wear to the remaining dentition. He had arthritis in his knees and lower back, and many arteries show signs of calcification. His gallbladder contained fourteen gallstones, most probably pigment stones. His right elbow joint had a calcified inflammation (enthesopathy), which may have been caused by repetitive chopping motions. The 2005 CT examination showed that the first lumbar vertebra was fractured, which left it flattened. X-ray analysis in 2014 suggested this damage occurred after his death. His cause of death is unknown. No attempt was made to remove his organs, which are still in place and well preserved. There is a large air-filled gap between Kha's torso and the bandage layers, suggesting his body was not fully dried before wrapping. Despite his sarcophagus being placed in the furthest corner of the tomb, Kha is thought to have died after his wife, as some of his objects were placed in the corridor because of the lack of space.

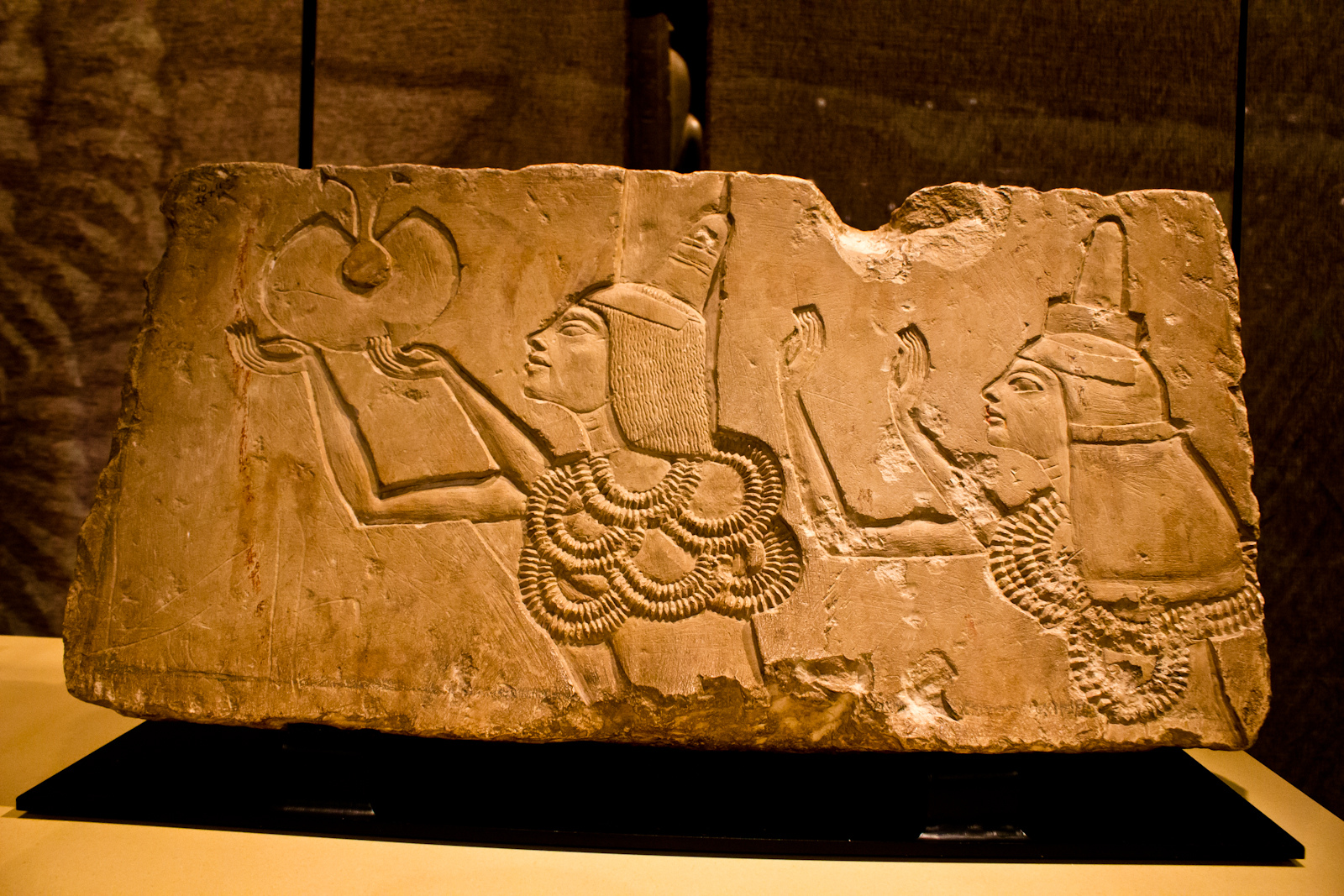
Relief of Ay and his wife Tey receiving the "gold of honour" from Akhenaten. Multiple double-stranded shebyu collars are draped around their necks.

Kha's body is equipped with metal jewellery, likely of gold. Around his neck is a necklace of large gold disc beads known as a shebyu collar. This item of jewellery was given by the king as part of the "gold of honour", a reward for service. These necklaces are well known from the Eighteenth Dynasty, being depicted in many statues and tombs of nobility including those of Sennefer, Ay and Horemheb. Kha's collar has only a single strand of beads instead of the usual minimum of two, leading to the suggestion by Egyptologist Susanne Binder that this may be the longest, outermost strand of a multi-stranded shebyu collar. He wears a pair of large earrings, one of the earliest known ancient Egyptian men to do so. These may also have been part of his royal reward, as similar earrings are depicted, albeit more rarely, in "gold of honour" reward scenes. Kha wears six finger rings; three have fixed oval bezels, one has a fixed rectangular bezel, and two have swivelling bezels of faience or stone. Further jewellery is purely funerary in nature. These consist of a stone heart scarab on a gold wire or chain, a stone or faience tyet amulet, and a gold foil bracelet around each upper arm. On his forehead is a stone snake head amulet, typically made of carnelian or jasper. The usual location of this amulet is around the neck, where it assists in the deceased's ability to breathe in the afterlife. Its placement on his forehead is possibly in imitation of the royal uraeus (rearing cobra) worn by kings.

==== Merit ====
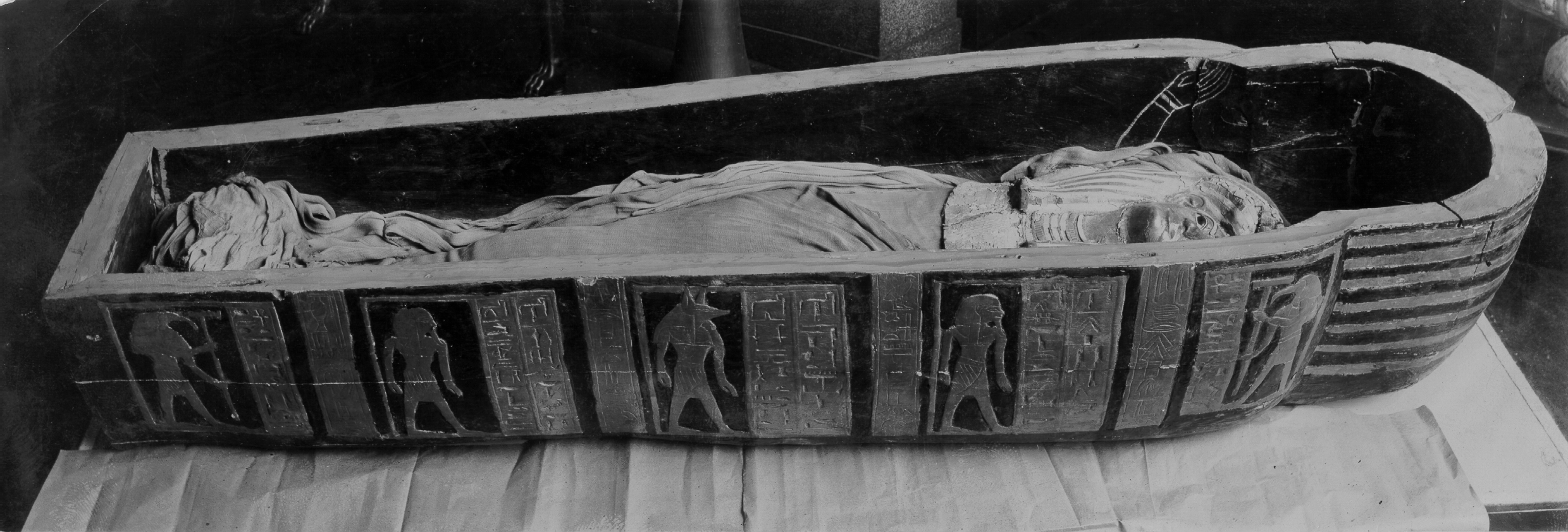
Merit's masked and partially shrouded mummy lying in her coffin trough

The space around Merit's body was packed with fabric bearing her husband's monogram. A sheet of linen was folded into a pad placed under the mummy and the space under her feet and around her body was filled with eight rolls of bandages. The mummy was wrapped in a further sheet of linen over the top of the shroud, the end of which was tucked under her gilded mummy mask. Her white shroud is stitched up the back with a whip stitch using a thick cord. In 2002 her mummy was sewed into a custom-dyed nylon net to consolidate the fabric.

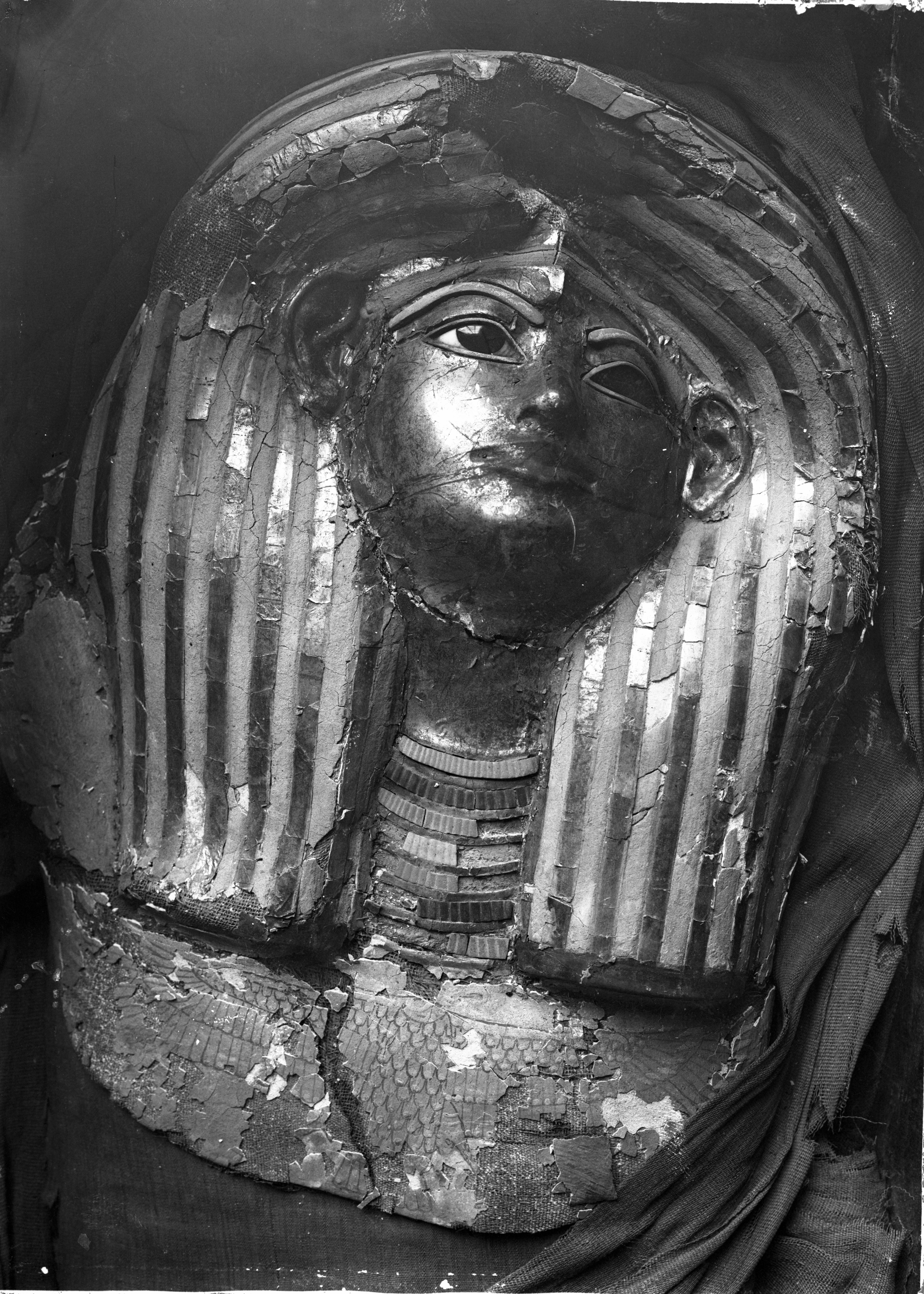
The collapsed and damaged mask of Merit in place on her body in 1906

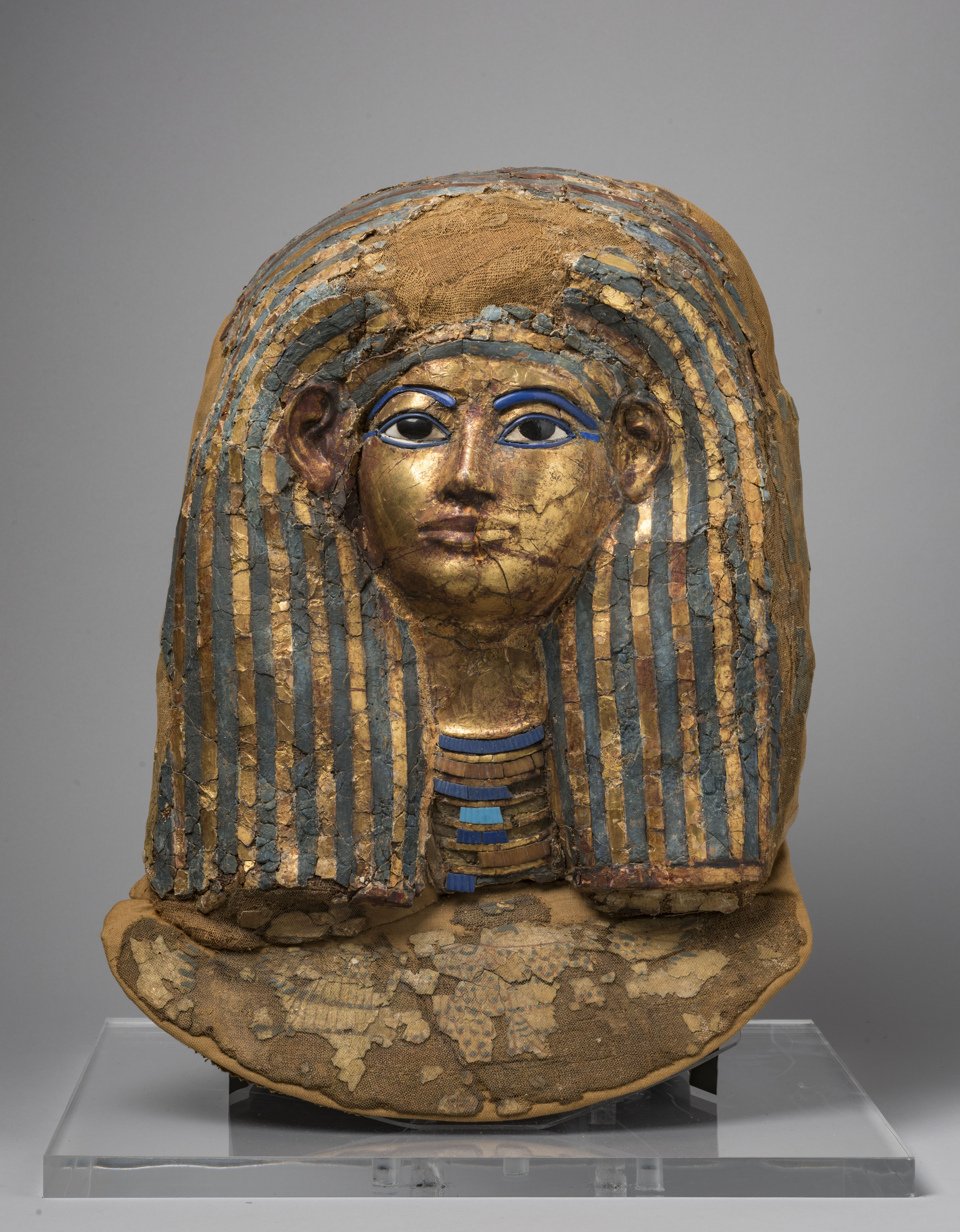
Restored mummy mask of Merit

Merit's mummy is fitted with a mask made of cartonnage, a papier-mâché-like material made from linen and plaster. It has inlaid eyes, of which only one original remains, made of alabaster and obsidian with cosmetic lines and eyebrows of blue paste. The surface is covered in gold leaf, now tarnished to a reddish colour, and the striped wig is coloured with Egyptian blue. The broad collar is composed of alternating bands of carnelian, dark blue paste imitating lapis lazuli, and turquoise. The pectoral necklace below the collar is decorated with a blue and red vulture painted on a yellow background. The mask was probably intended for Kha and was donated for his wife's burial. By the time of discovery the mask had sustained some damage, particularly to the back and sides, and one of the inlaid eyes was missing. This may be a result of the mask being much too big for Merit's head, leading to collapse once placed in the coffin. Alternatively, the damage and the missing eye have been attributed to rough handling by Schiaparelli's workmen. The mask was restored in 1967 but degraded quickly and further restoration was carried out in 2002. It was placed on a new padded mount in 2004. The back of the mask could not be restored as it was found detached underneath the mummy, soaked in oils and resins and flattened by weight; it is now stored separately.

The wrapped mummy of Merit is 147 centimetres (4.82 ft) tall. She is positioned on her back with her arms extended and hands nearly crossed over the pubis. Her age at death is estimated to be between 25 and 35 years. Estimates for her height in life vary between 148 centimetres (4.86 ft) and 160 centimetres (5.2 ft). She wears a long, crimped wig on her head, which is turned slightly to the right. Given her age at death, her teeth have little wear but some teeth have been lost and others have cavities. She is less well-preserved than her husband, with many of her ribs and vertebrae broken and displaced by postmortem damage to the torso. No attempt was made to remove her brain or other internal organs. Given that she was buried in a coffin intended for Kha, her death was probably unexpected but her cause of death is unknown.

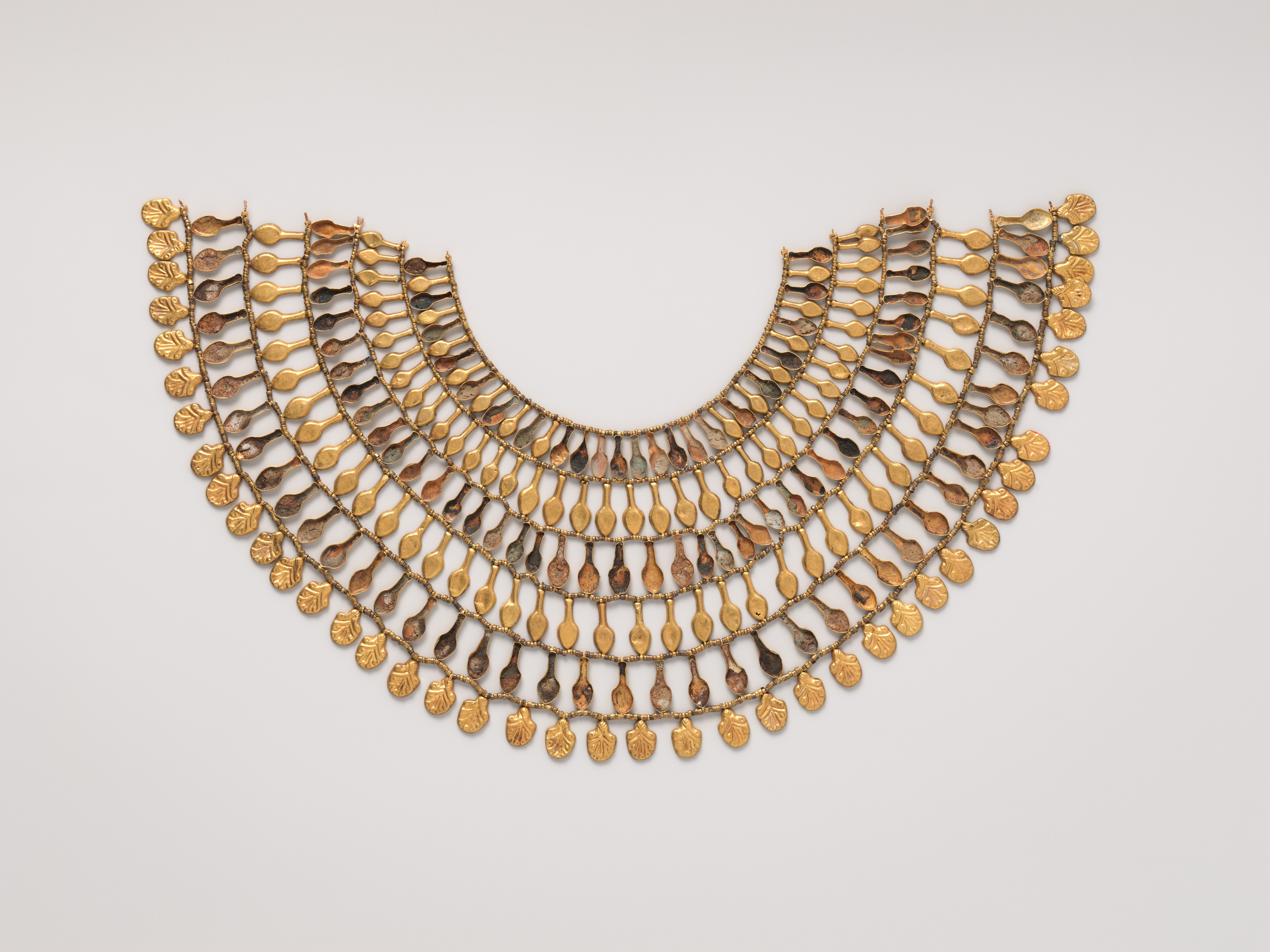
Merit's broad collar is similar to this example composed of nefer and palmette-shaped beads from the burial of three foreign wives of Thutmose III

Like Kha, her body wears metal jewellery. Around her neck is a triple-strand necklace of fine gold beads; the strings have broken and the beads have scattered, with some being seen by her ankles. Across her chest and shoulders is a gold and stone broad collar similar in design to one from the burial of three foreign wives of Thutmose III and the collars seen on the coffins and mask of Thuya, the mother-in-law of Amenhotep III. Her ears are double pierced and she wears two pairs of ribbed hoop earrings. She wears four gold rings on her left hand; a further ring is seen behind her shoulder in X-ray and CT images. This ring was either displaced from her finger by postmortem damage or was intended for her right hand and forgotten during the wrapping process, being slipped into the shroud before burial. A second gold ring was found during conservation work, stuck to the back of her mask in the embalming resins. The bezel is incised with an image of the goddess Hathor as a cow, wearing a menat-necklace, standing on a boat. This design is similar to a ring found on the body of Nefertity in tomb DM1159a. Around her hips is a beaded girdle of metal cowrie shell-shaped beads interspersed with strings of small non-metal beads. Similar girdles are known from the burials of the Middle Kingdom princess Sithathoriunet and three of Thutmose III's foreign wives. On each wrist are ten-stranded bracelets of metal and non-metal beads with a sliding catch. They appear to have the same design as the necklace and girdle and probably formed part of a set. Merit was not equipped with any funerary amulets, possibly because of her unexpected death.

=== Other funerary equipment ===
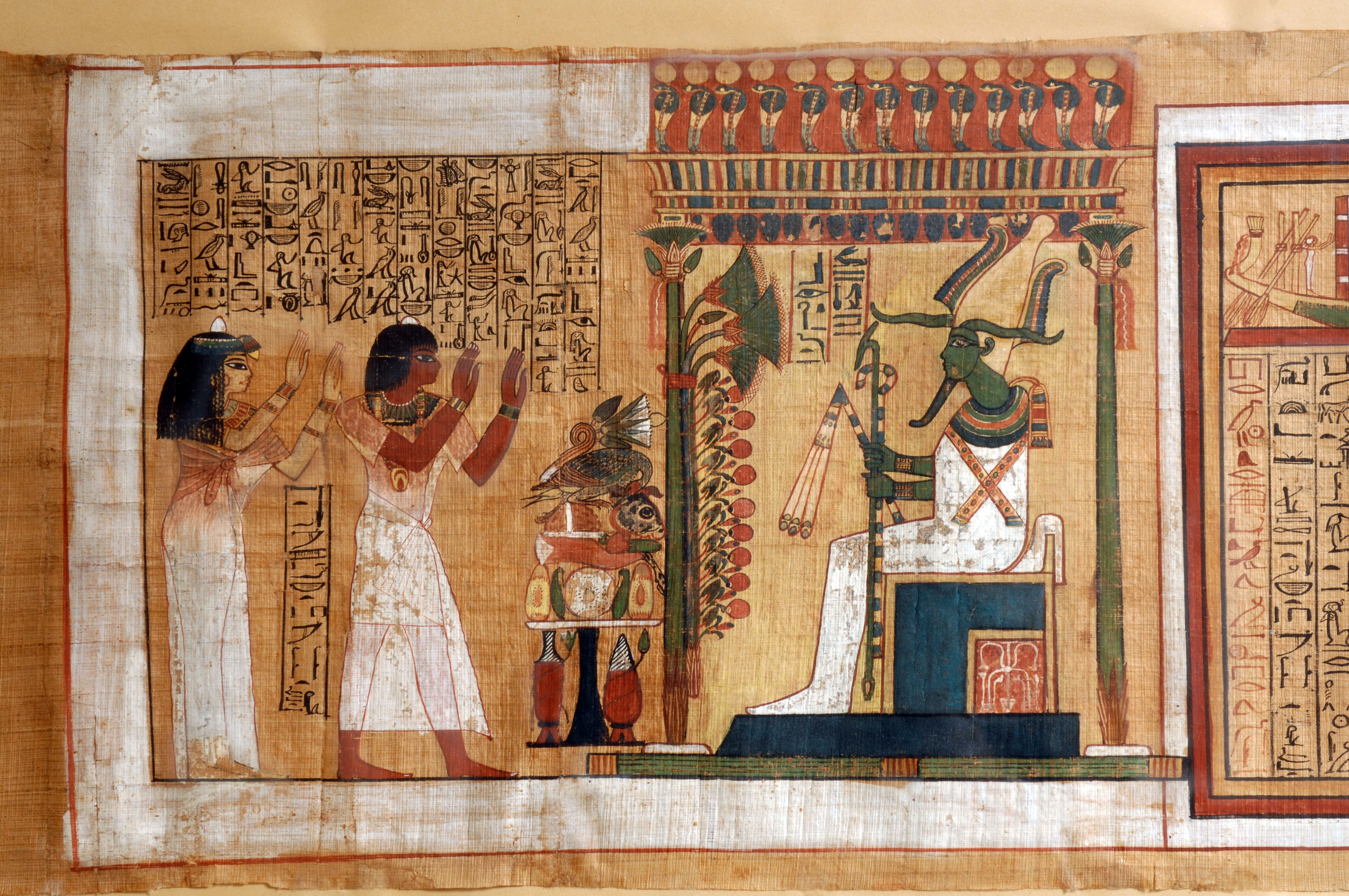
Kha and Merit before Osiris in a vignette from Kha's Book of the Dead

Kha's copy of the Book of the Dead was found laid out atop his outer mummiform coffin. Schiaparelli noted that at the time of its discovery the papyrus was "perfectly conserved and as supple as if recently made". It is 13.8 metres (45 ft) long and contains 33 chapters. It is one of the earliest-known copies of the Book of the Dead and is similar to the copies of the near-contemporary nobles Maiherpri and Yuya. The text is written in cursive hieroglyphs like Maiherpri's but the sequence of chapters is more similar to Yuya's copy. Additionally, like Yuya, Kha is depicted wearing a heart amulet. The colourful vignettes depict Kha generically, showing less customisation than either noble's books. As was typical, Kha and Merit's names and titles were inserted into gaps left in the pre-written text.

In her 2019 study of the document, the Egyptologist Susanne Töpfer suggested that the papyrus may have been commissioned for someone else, as there is an instance where a name has been erased and overwritten, and the attire of the god Osiris was changed from a feathered shroud to a plain white one.

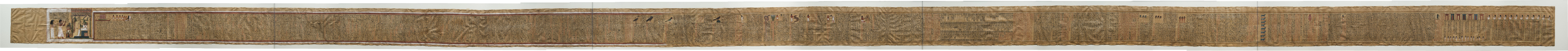
Book of the Dead of Kha (S. 8438), Museo Egizio, Turin

A second copy of the Book of the Dead naming the couple is now in the Bibliothèque nationale de France in Paris. Its provenance is unknown. It may originally have come from the pit Bruyère found in front of their chapel. It was among the antiquities donated to the Bibliothèque nationale in 1862 by Honoré Théodoric d'Albert de Luynes. The papyrus is incomplete, being only 197 centimetres (78 in) long with 13 chapters; it was probably cut up for easier sale on the antiquities market. This copy was likely intended for Merit as her name appears more often than Kha's, a unique instance in the Eighteenth Dynasty of a woman being provided with her own copy. Alternatively, it could be a separate copy that ultimately went unused and was put aside for reuse.

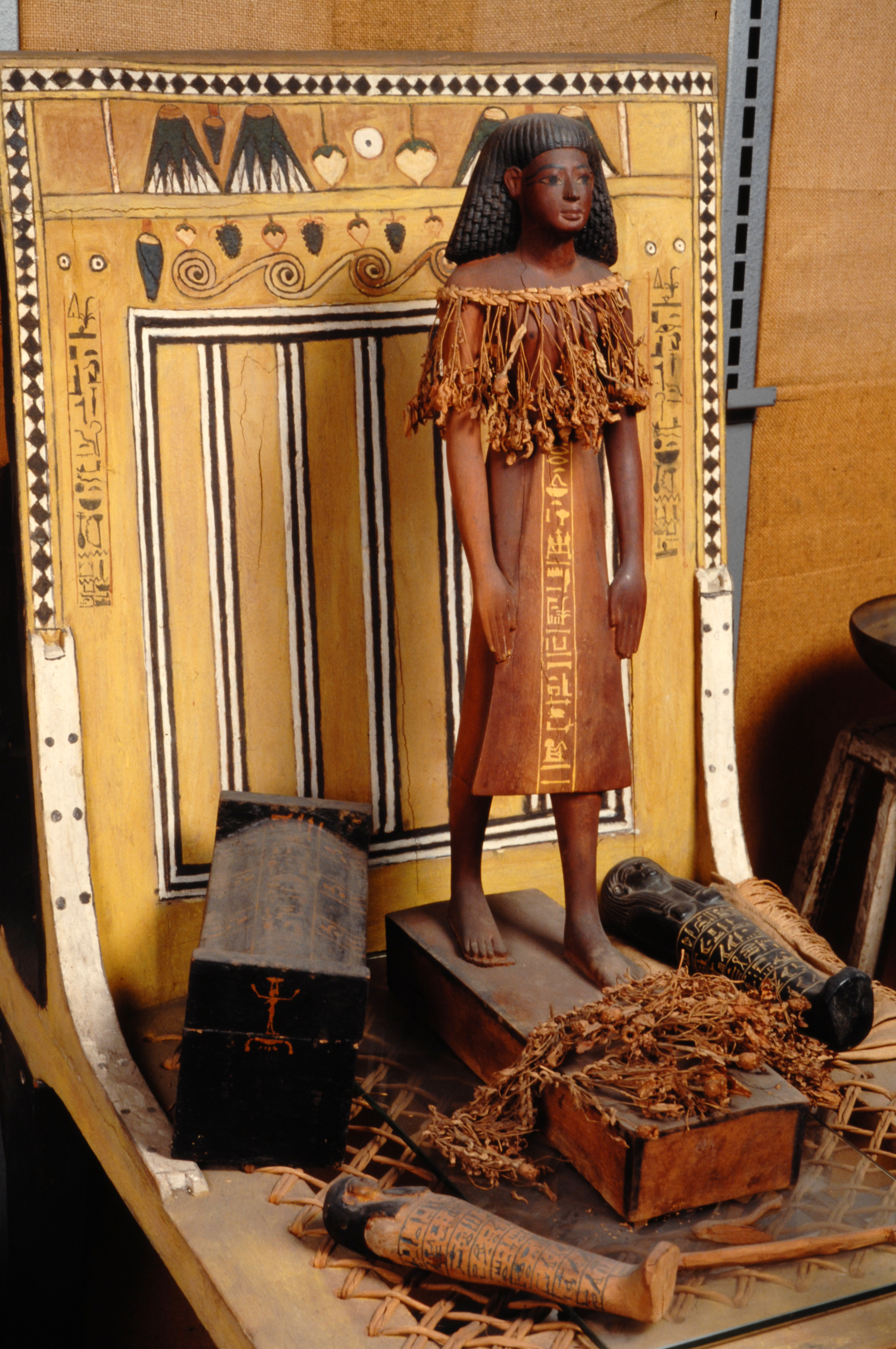
Wooden statuette of Kha displayed as found in the tomb

A wooden funerary statuette was placed in the tomb, standing on a chair. The 43 cm (17 in) tall figure depicts a youthful Kha wearing a kilt, striding forward. Around the shoulders was a garland of melilot leaves; another was folded at its feet. The eyes and wig are painted and the column of text down the front of his kilt is filled with yellow pigment but the surface is otherwise plain. The inscription asks that his ka (soul) may receive "all that appears on the table of offerings to Amun, king of the gods". The rectangular base is inscribed with an offering formula ensuring Kha received the standard bread, beer, ox and fowl with the additional alabaster, linen, wine, and milk. There are occasional examples of such figures from other contemporary non-noble Theban tombs; their inclusion may have been more common than these finds suggest, as many unprovenanced statuettes are known from museum collections. These figures are generally absent from contemporary elite (robbed) burials, possibly indicating they were made of valuable metal and looted by ancient robbers. Kha was provided with two ushabti figures for his use in the afterlife. One is made of stone and the other is wooden and was provided with its own miniature sarcophagus and agricultural tools. These were placed immediately behind and in front of the statuette. Merit was not given any ushabti. This inequality between the spouses may not have been unusual as a similar imbalance is seen in the burial of Amenhotep III's parents-in-law, Yuya and Thuya.

== Location and display of objects ==
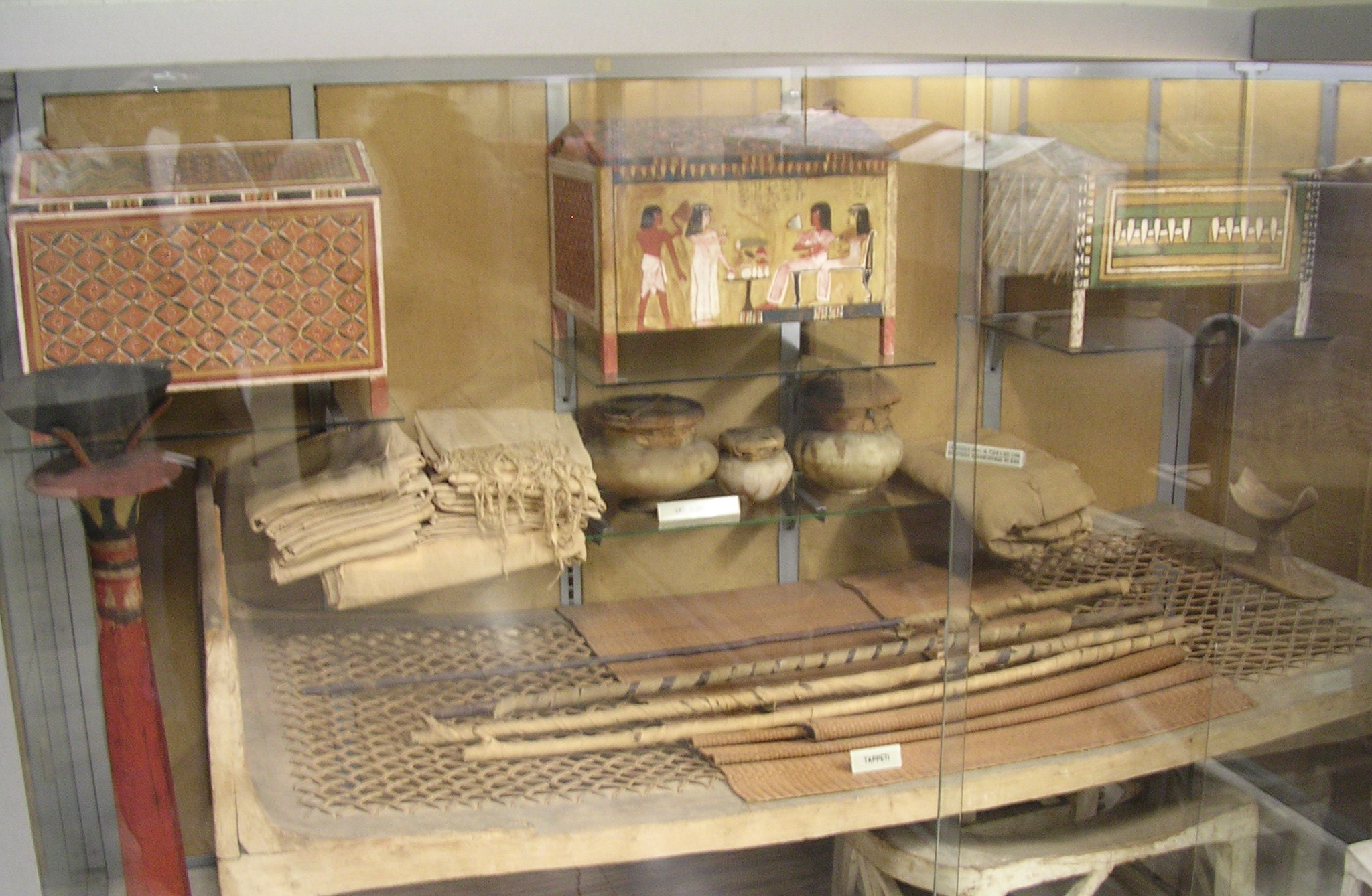
Display case in Museo Egizio, as seen in 2005

Following the discovery, Gaston Maspero, director of the Egyptian Antiquities Service, awarded the majority of the contents of TT8 to Schiaparelli. They are housed in the Museo Egizio in Turin, Italy, where Schiaparelli was appointed director in 1894. The Egyptian Museum in Cairo retained only a few objects from the tomb, keeping one of the two lamp stands, loaves of bread, three blocks of salt, and nineteen pottery vases. Other objects associated with the funerary complex are held in Paris: Merit's Book of the Dead is in the Bibliothèque nationale de France, while the pyramidion of Kha's chapel is in the Louvre.

Maspero's reasons for allowing nearly the entire contents of this intact tomb to leave Egypt are unknown. Maspero was a friend and former mentor of Schiaparelli. It is probable that Maspero considered the contents of TT8 to be duplicates or not unlike anything already in the museum's collection. Vassilika suggests that, with the discovery of the largely unrobbed noble burial of Yuya and Thuya in the previous year, 1905, the discovery of more noble burials may have been expected. The writer Dennis C. Forbes suggests space may also have been a factor, with the contents of Yuya and Thuya's tomb, and that of Maiherpri, discovered in 1899, occupying a large amount of exhibition space.

The contents of the tomb could not be displayed upon their arrival due to lack of space. Within months of arriving, the change in humidity affected the leather seats of the stools and the Book of the Dead, rendering them cracked and fragile. A former storeroom next to the gallery dedicated to Deir el-Medina was turned into a new display space for the assemblage, opening on 10 October 1908. The objects were displayed within a single small room, refurbished in the 1960s, which then-museum director Silvio Curto said gave visitors "a good idea of the place at the moment of discovery". They remained in that room until 2006, when they were moved to the ground floor, and were redisplayed again in 2015 in a more spacious first-floor gallery after the Museo Egizio underwent extensive renovations.

The room dedicated to Kha and Merit was reinstalled again on 4 December 2025. The new display hosts 460 objects, including coffins, furniture, textiles, the senet game board, and everyday items, and includes open-storage displays for textiles, a restored presentation of the tomb door, a 3D model of the tomb, and a 14-metre anoxic case for Kha's Book of the Dead. For the 120th anniversary of the discovery of the tomb, the pyramidion from the Louvre and Merit's Book of the Dead from the Bibliothèque nationale de France were displayed together in Room 7 from 14 February to 17 August 2026. The pyramidion remains on loan to the Museo Egizio until 12 February 2027.
