= Menhet, Menwi and Merti =

Three foreign-born wives of Thutmose III

- King's Wives
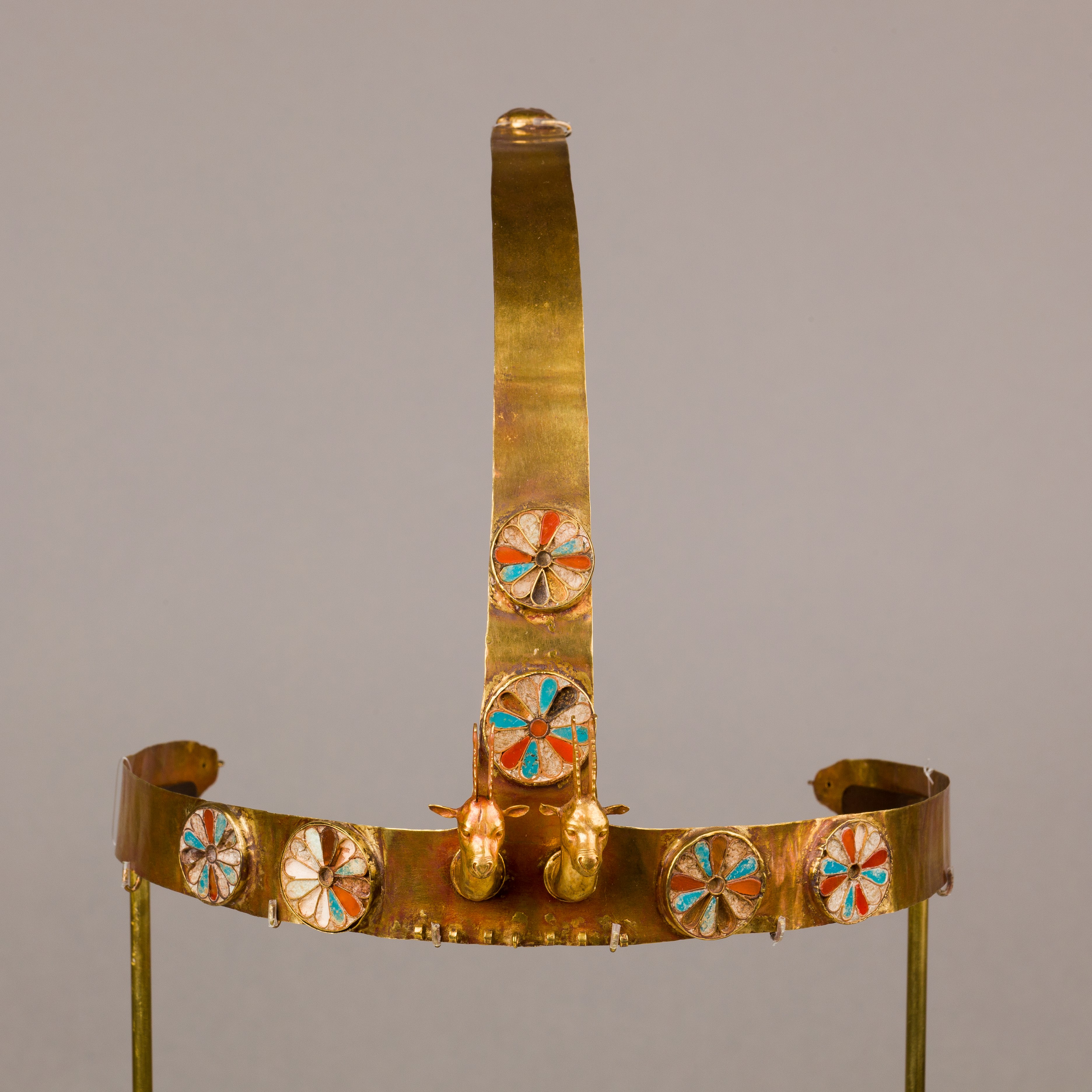
- A gazelle-headed diadem of Menhet, Menwi or Merti
- Burial: Tomb 1, Wadi D, in Wadi Gabbanat el-Qurud near Luxor, Egypt
- Spouse: Thutmose III
- Dynasty: 18th Dynasty

Menhet, Menwi and Merti, also spelled Manhata, Manuwai and Maruta, were three minor foreign-born wives of Pharaoh Thutmose III of the Eighteenth Dynasty. They are known for their lavishly furnished rock-cut tomb in Wadi Gabbanat el-Qurud near Luxor, Egypt. They are suggested to be Syrian, as the names all fit into Canaanite name forms, although their ultimate origin is unknown. A West Semitic origin is likely, but both West Semitic and Hurrian derivations have been suggested for Menwi. Each of the wives bear the title of "king's wife", and were likely only minor members of the royal harem. It is not known if the women were related as the faces on the lids of their canopic jars are all different.

Their intact tomb was discovered in 1916 by Qurnawi locals. The mummies and other organic materials, such as wood, had disintegrated due to water seeping into the tomb over the millennia, but metal and stone objects survived. Their jewelry and other burial goods were sold on the local and international antiquities market, with most items being purchased by the Metropolitan Museum of Art between 1918 and 1988.

== Lives and position ==
Menhet, Menwi and Merti in hieroglyphs
Aa15 D38 n O4 t N17 X2 B1
Menhet
m D38 W24 V4 i B1
Menwi
m D38 E23 U33 i B1
Merti

Although not attested outside of their tomb, Menhet, Menwi, and Merti are the earliest known foreign women within the royal household. Their origins are unknown, but given that their names fit into Canaanite forms, a West Semitic origin is the most likely. Both West Semitic and Hurrian derivations have been suggested for Menwi. Herbert Winlock suggested that the women were the daughters of Syrian rulers, and it has been proposed that one of these women was the "daughter of a great one" mentioned in the Annals of Thutmose III, brought back by him from Retjenu in his Year 40 campaign. However, the early style of pottery and the presence of the names of both Hatshepsut and Thutmose III on objects from their tomb, together with the mention of only a single foreign princess, makes the identification of Menhet, Menwi, or Merti with this particular foreign woman, arriving late in Thutmose's reign, unlikely. The trio likely lived in the north of Egypt, possibly at Gurob near Memphis where a royal harem residence was located. Foreign wives seem to have been treated differently to Egyptian wives, as Menhet, Menwi, and Merti are not depicted in the tomb of their husband, despite wives of the same title being depicted. However, this may be due to their deaths occurring well before the decoration of his tomb. The three were not without status, as they are given the title "king's wife" rather than simply "wife" or "noblewoman". At least one of the women had a religious position as evidenced by the gazelle-headed diadem and possible sistrum found in the tomb.

Menhet, Menwi, and Merti were buried in Wadi Gabbanat el-Qurud, an area used as the burial ground for royal women and children in the early Eighteenth Dynasty. Their tomb is located close to, and is of equal scale to, the cliff tomb intended for Hatshepsut as the chief queen of Thutmose II. They were evidently buried in Egyptian style with Egyptian burial goods. Their causes of death are unknown, as water seeping into the tomb over time caused their coffins and mummies to decay entirely.

Archaeologist Herbert E. Winlock suggests that, given the tomb's inaccessible location, the three women were buried together in a single funeral, perhaps indicating they died close together, possibly during an epidemic. However, his suggestion that they were executed as the result of a harem conspiracy is considered unlikely, as they were buried with lavish royal gifts bearing the king's name. It is now considered likely that the burials could have been made one at a time. Their funerary objects all seem to have been made at the same time. This, together with the location of their tomb and the presence of the name of Hatshepsut, places their deaths and burials in the early to mid-reign of Thutmose III, likely between Year 7 and Year 22.

== Tomb ==
=== Location and layout ===
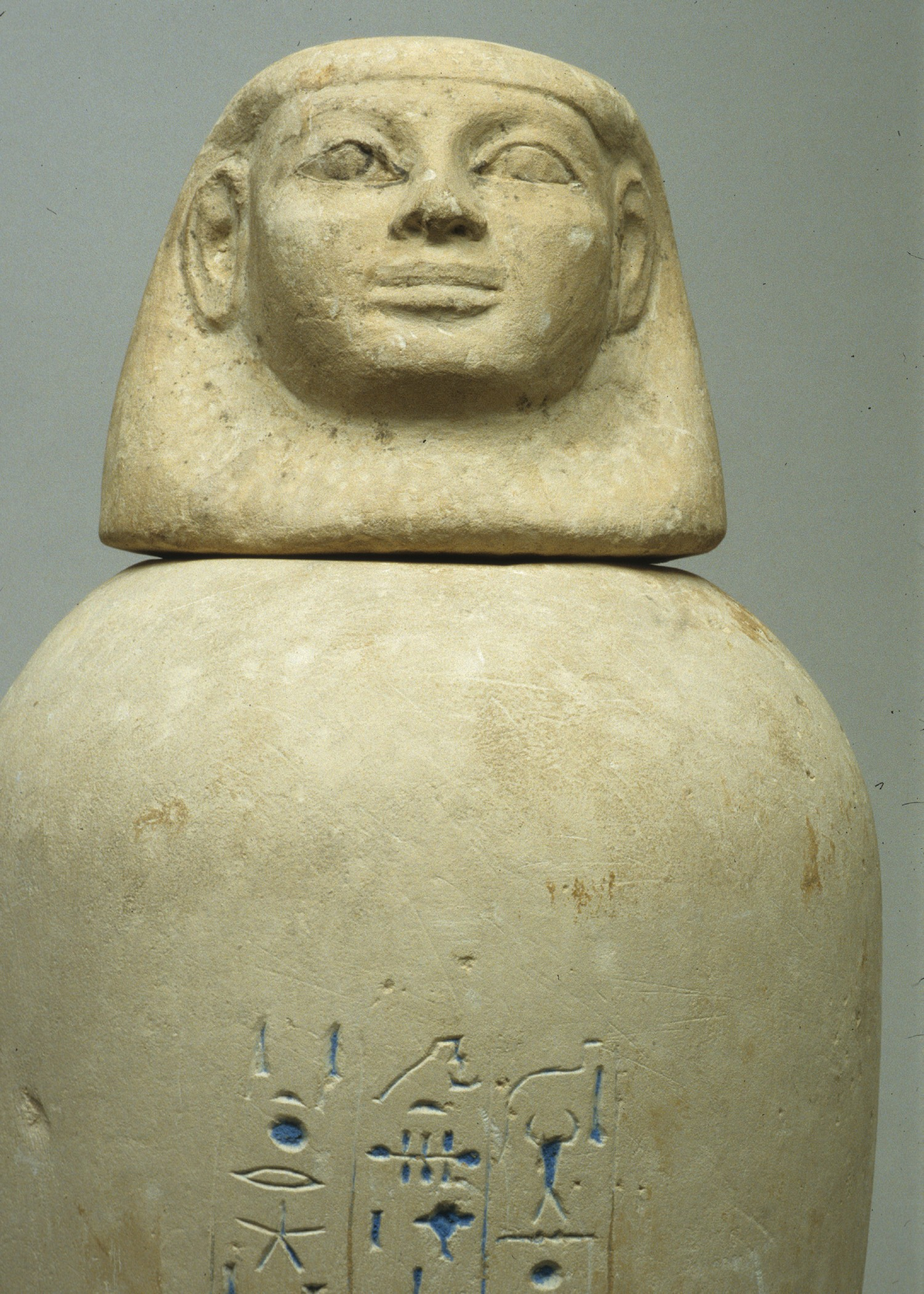
Canopic jar of Menhet

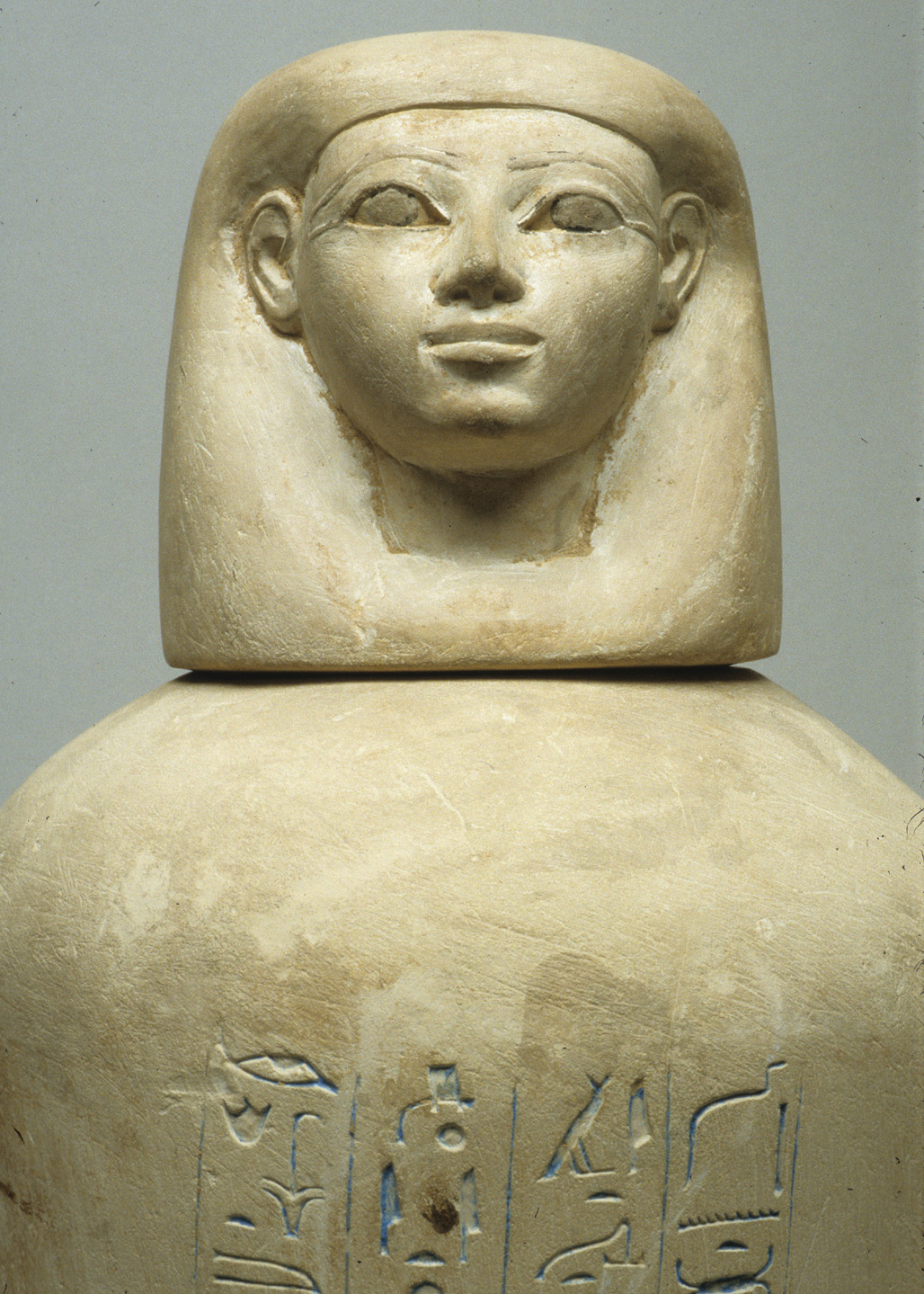
Canopic jar of Menwi

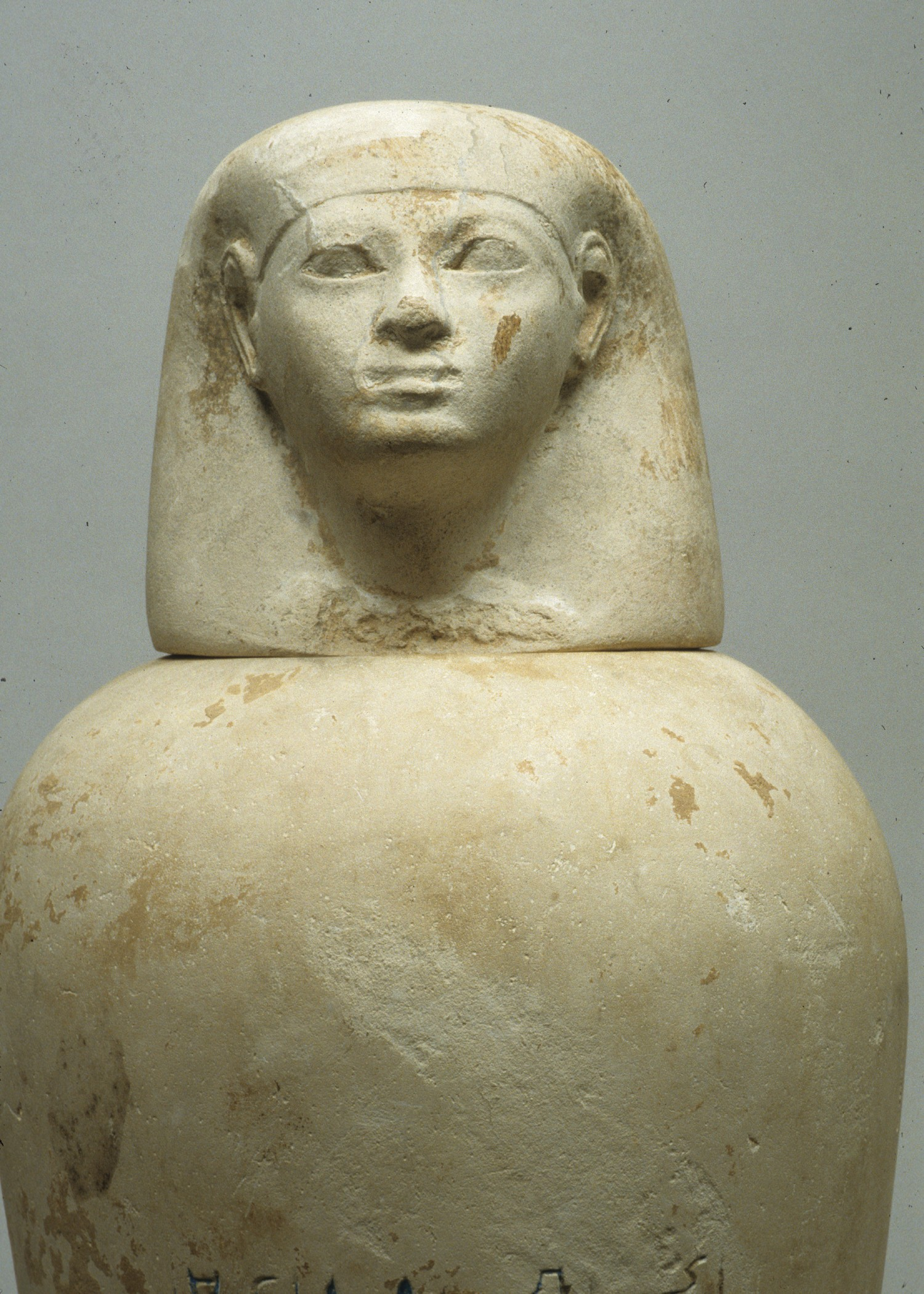
Canopic jar of Merti

The tomb, formally numbered Wadi D Tomb 1, is located at the head of Wadi D in Wadi Gabbanat el-Qurud, southwest of the Valley of the Kings. This "remote and unfrequented" area of the Theban necropolis, part of the Western Wadis near the Valley of the Queens was used as a burial ground for queens and royal children during the early Eighteenth Dynasty. The tomb is cut into the base of the vertical cliff 30 metres (98 ft) back in a narrow cleft 10 metres (33 ft) above the valley floor. The location is such that the "mouth of the cleft is totally inaccessible to anyone standing below and equally so to anyone above, unless he has come provided with a rope to lower himself over the precipitous rock." Parallels have been drawn with the tomb cut for Hatshepsut as Great Royal Wife in Wadi A, a tomb in Wadi C thought to belong to Neferure, and the tomb of Thutmose III, as all these tombs are cut high into the cliff face in narrow steep-sided valleys.

The layout is simple and consists of a short vertical shaft 1.5 metres (4.9 ft) wide and 4 metres (13 ft) deep that leads to a descending passageway 12 metres (39 ft) long. Mohammed Hammad, one of the local discoverers, recalled that there was originally intact blocking at both ends of the passage. The corridor opens to the right onto a single chamber measuring 7.5 by 5 metres (25 ft × 16 ft) with a height of 1.5–2 metres (4.9–6.6 ft). There is no well shaft. Winlock noted that by the time of his visit in the 1920s the ceiling of both the chamber and passage had fallen. The tomb is entirely undecorated.

=== Discovery and excavations ===
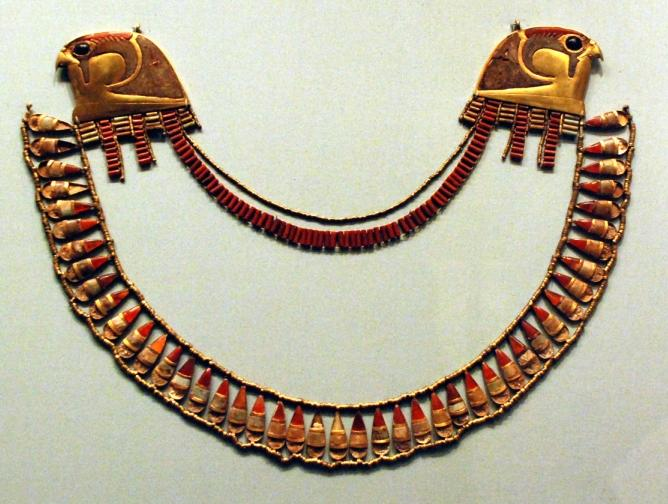
A broad collar with falcon-head terminals from the tomb of Thutmose III's three wives

The tomb was discovered by local Qurnawi villagers on approximately 7 August 1916. The archaeologist Ernest Mackay, who was surveying private tombs in the Theban area, heard rumors that an impressive find of jewelry had been made in Wadi Gabbanat el-Qurud and immediately alerted the Inspector of Antiquities, Tewfik Boutros; Mackay visited the tomb and also wrote several letters to inform the Egyptologist Alan Gardiner in England. Boutros did his best to identify the thieves and to obtain permission from the authorities to excavate. He had the accused men taken to Luxor and their houses were searched; however, no evidence was found and the charges had to be dropped. Permission was granted by 2 September and the excavation, headed by Mohammed Chaban, was conducted 14-28 September. Small finds consisting of metal, stone, and jewelry were entered into the register of the Egyptian Museum, Cairo.

In 1916-17 Howard Carter investigated the valley head and cleft for signs of further tomb cuttings during his work in the wider area. Although he deemed the boulder-filled hollow above the tomb entrance a "very likely spot" several hours of work proved there was nothing to be found there.

In October 1988 the Metropolitan Museum of Art led an excavation of the tomb and its surroundings with the aim of formally mapping the tomb and determining the accuracy of earlier accounts. Excavation focused on the tomb, its platform, and the valley head below. The tomb's roughly cut descending corridor had partially re-filled with debris over the intervening years, leaving 1 metre (3.3 ft) of crawl space. Several bats had taken up residence on the badly damaged vaulted ceiling of the burial chamber. Pharaonic remains were limited to pottery, pieces of stone vessels, beads, and glass fragments. Large quantities of pottery, making up approximately 120 vessels, were found dumped below the tomb, at the head of the Wadi; the pottery was probably originally located in the burial chamber. Evidence of modern activity was seen both on the platform and within the tomb itself, with rubbish and a graffito dated 1957 seen on the sheer cliff walls of the platform, and baskets made of rubber and straw, along with two hoes found in the corridor. Smoke spots on ceiling of the burial chamber were evidence of robber's fires. A small roughly cut pit tomb was discovered at the head of the Wadi. It contained fragmentary pieces of stone vessels and beads matching those already associated with the wives' tomb; it is suggested this represents a separate burial or simply a place that robbers had sorted through their finds.

=== Contents ===
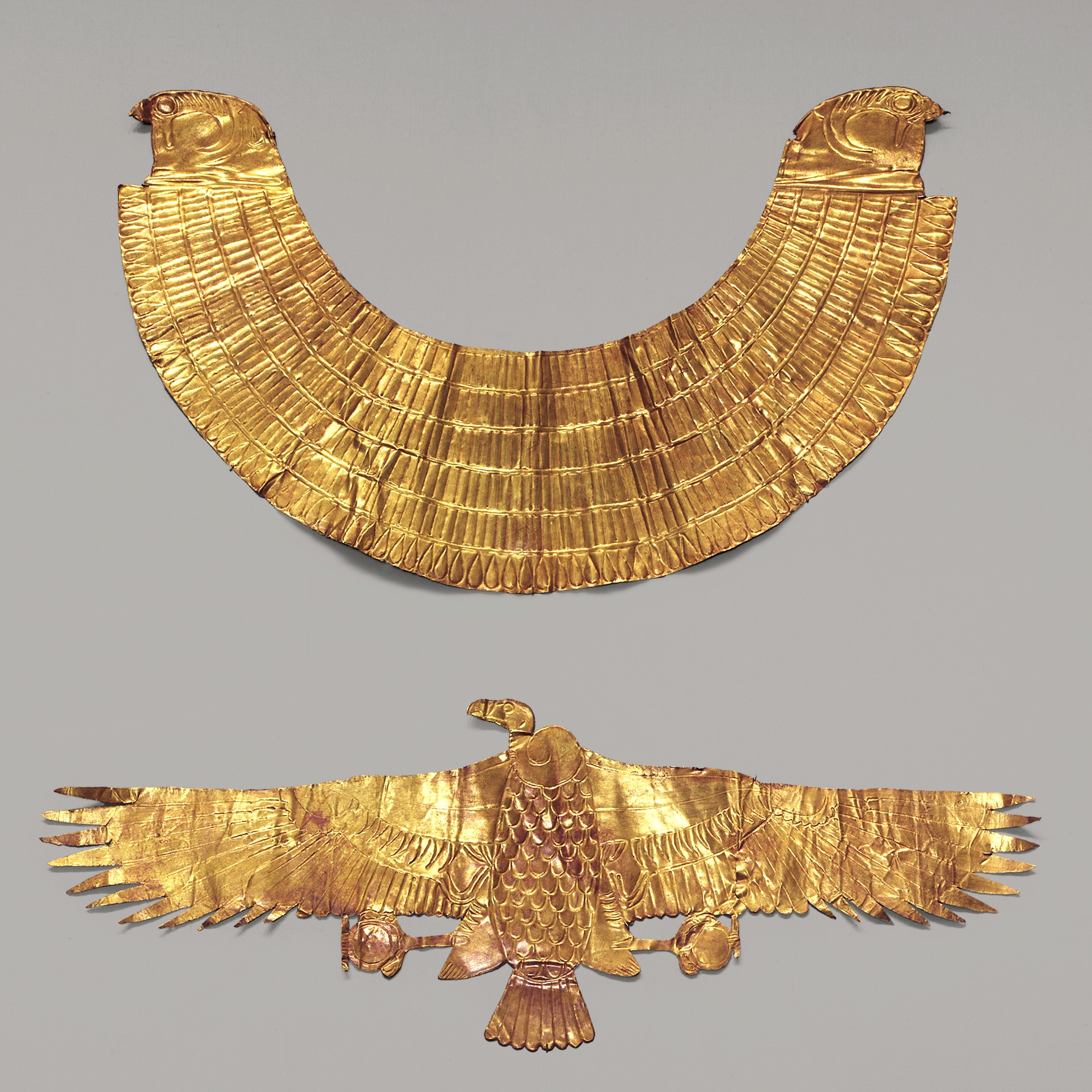
Incised sheet gold broad collar with falcon-headed terminals and vulture pectoral

Little is known of the original state of the tomb but it is thought to have contained three intact burials. Mohammed Hammad recalled that the objects were arranged in an orderly fashion on top of a layer of limestone chips, only buried by fallen pieces of ceiling. The coffins, said by Howard Carter to be sets of three nested coffins, were lying side by side, with their heads against the southern wall, "totally rotted by damp." Only the gold and stone objects had survived as the wood and mummies had disintegrated due to moisture "from water seeping through the cliffs above." However, the general appearance and nature of their burial can be reconstructed from the surviving objects.

Despite being foreign-born, all of the wives were buried in Egyptian style. Their mummies were equipped with stone heart amulets inscribed with Chapter 30B of the Book of the Dead. The inscriptions use the masculine gender, indicating they were likely stock items not custom-made for the women. At their throats would have been a single carnelian seweret-bead on a gold wire and a necklet of faience melon beads. Across their chests and torsos were a broad collar with falcon-headed terminals, a vulture breastplate, and a bandage amulet, all of incised gold foil. These would have been enclosed within the bandages of each mummy, as was seen on the mummy of Tutankhamun. Each finger and toe was fitted with a gold stall, the earliest examples found so far. On their feet were sheet gold sandals with wide straps and designs of rosettes and lozenges incised into the soles, presumably imitating leather sandals. These are unlike other New Kingdom examples, but parallel those worn by the mummy of the much later Psusennes I. Their organs were placed in a set of four limestone canopic jars with human-headed stoppers, the text on which was incised and infilled with blue pigment. Based on the presence of fragments of paint and gold leaf, the embalmed organs were likely made into the shape of mummies and fitted with cartonnage masks.

Many jars, containers, and vessels of various materials and for various purposes were present in the tomb. Each wife had a silver vessel inscribed for her; they were likely a gift from the king and used for ritual water libations. Over forty stone ointment and cosmetic jars and bowls of various shapes and sizes are known, some inscribed with the names of Thutmose III and Hatshepsut and others having gilded rims. At least one glass vessel was likely imported into Egypt. Other cosmetic items were two mirrors with handles in the shape of a composite Hathor-head and papyrus umbel. Both have handles of gold foil over (decayed) wood and mirrors of silver. The larger mirror has inlaid eyes, while the smaller has incised details and is inscribed with the name of Thutmose III. Mackay recounts that one of the women had a gold sistrum with a Hathor-headed handle and "cross-bars that jingled" instead of a mirror.

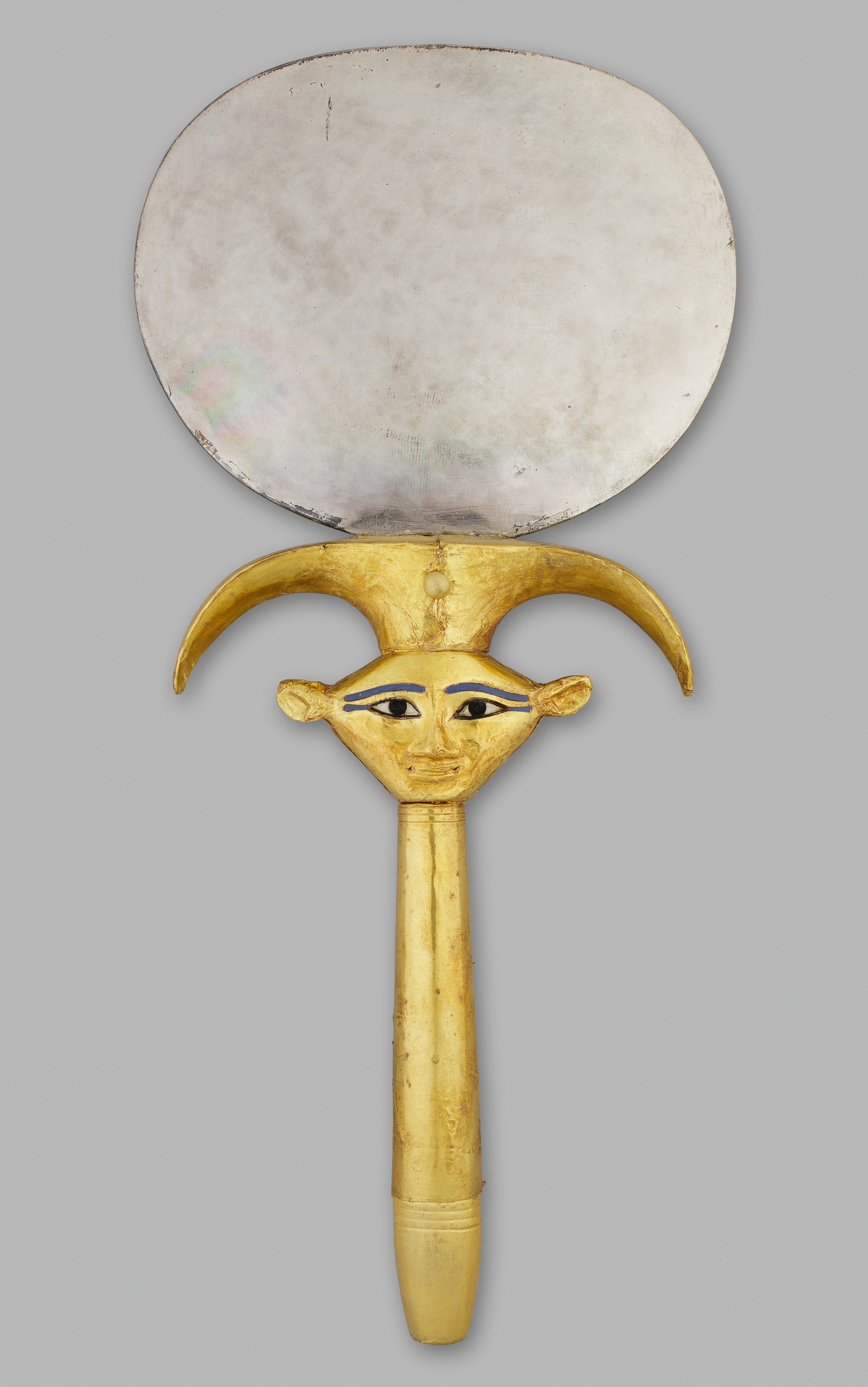
One of the mirrors with a Hathor emblem handle

There is uncertainty over the exact jewellery present in the tomb, as it was obtained on the art market, often with uncertain provenance. Most of these items were in triplicate, particularly those made especially for the funeral. Two gold headdresses are known from the tomb, the most obvious of which is a diadem with a busy design of rosettes and two gazelle heads. Wear indicates this piece was worn by one of the women in life. Gazelle diadems are depicted in art from the Eighteenth Dynasty, but no other gazelle diadem survives from ancient Egypt. It seems to have been associated with the goddess Hathor and with the women of the royal harem, as it is depicted being worn by princesses and royal ornaments. The other headdress is a large wig cover with a palmette base plate and pendant chevrons and rosettes, resulting in the appearance of a jeweled wig; such a headdress is paralleled by that of Ahmose-Meritamun on her colossal outer coffin. There are many additional inlaid rosettes whose original function is unclear but may represent an additional headdress or collar.

Each wife had at least one broad collar, of which three separate examples survive, and a pair of hinged gold bracelets inlaid with carnelian and glass and inscribed with the names of Thutmose III. There are two girdles, one featuring abstract cowrie shell-shaped beads and the other tilapia fish, both of which have connections to Hathor. A possible third girdle, also with abstracted cowrie spacers, has less secure provenance. There are also two pairs of beaded feline armlets, one pair of which feature carnelian cats and the other gold lion cubs. Smaller items of jewelry were pairs of ribbed gold penannular earrings, and seven gold finger rings with scarab-shaped bezels of gold, lapis, and steatite and inscribed with the name of Thutmose III; one example also bears the name of Hatshepsut. These rings are considered by Lilyquist to be too large in size to be worn by the women in life.

Many other beads and jewelry elements are associated with the tomb but offer no clues to what they were originally a part of, including gold beads in the shape of Taweret and Bes. The majority of the gold work in the tomb is of Egyptian manufacture, with only a select few items, including the large wig cover and the granulated gold beads possibly being made in the Near East.

=== Dispersal ===
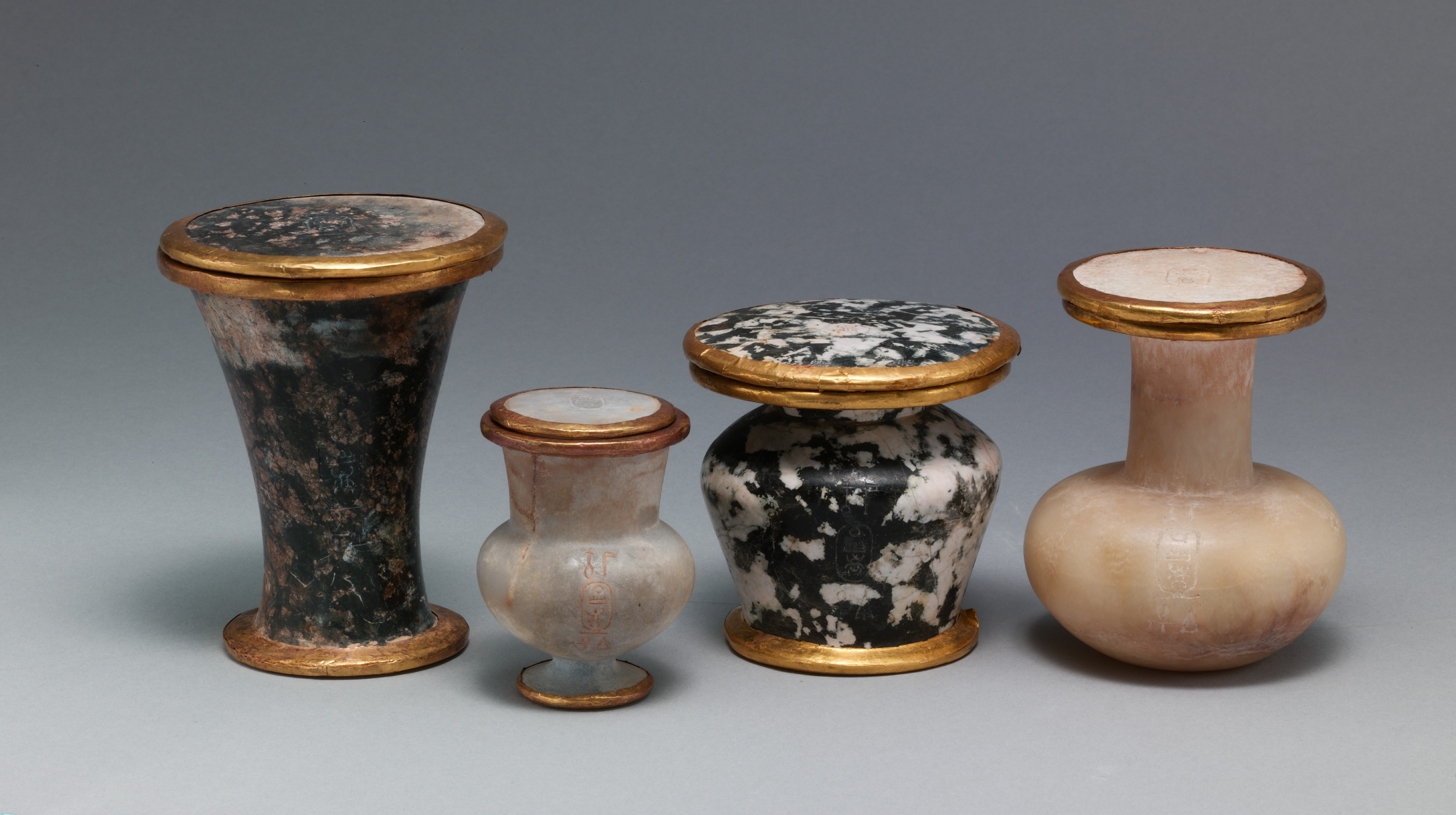
Selection of stone vessels naming Thutmose III

The tomb's contents were quickly separated by its discoverers in August 1916. According to Ernest Mackay, Muhammed Mohassib was the buyer of the gold items from the tomb although he denied all knowledge. Objects from the tomb began appearing on the local antiquities market in the following years. Cloisonné plaques from the large headdress were noted by Ambrose Lansing in a dealer's shop in December 1916. In 1917 three sets of canopic jars and seven stone vessels appeared on the market, and in 1918 five silver containers and cups appeared. Carter bought approximately twelve of the stone and silver vessels which were then sold to Lansing; he also bought the three sets of canopic jars and eight stone vessels, mostly of alabaster, on behalf of Lord Carnarvon. Winlock states that in the years following the discovery that stone vessels "obviously from this tomb could be bought almost anywhere in the town [Luxor]."

Most of their surviving funerary remains were tracked down and purchased on the antiquities market at the time and many now reside at the Metropolitan Museum in New York. The majority of their material was obtained between 1918 and 1922. Many of the stone vessels came from Lansing, while other jars and jewelry were purchased piecemeal as they appeared on the market in Europe. Approaches were made to the owners of the pieces with the monetary backing of several museum trustees including Henry Walters, George Fisher Baker, Edward Harkness, and V. Everit Macy. Other pieces were acquired from the international art market between 1957 and 1988. Some of the pieces said to originate from the tomb were found to be genuine artefacts of earlier or much later date, while others thought to be genuine are modern forgeries. These range from individual beads and amulets to headdress pieces and gold vessels. These were copied from existing objects from the tomb, or those known from other excavations, and are identified by, among other things, their production methods which utilize modern tools and methods, gold purity, and style of inscriptions.

== Gallery ==
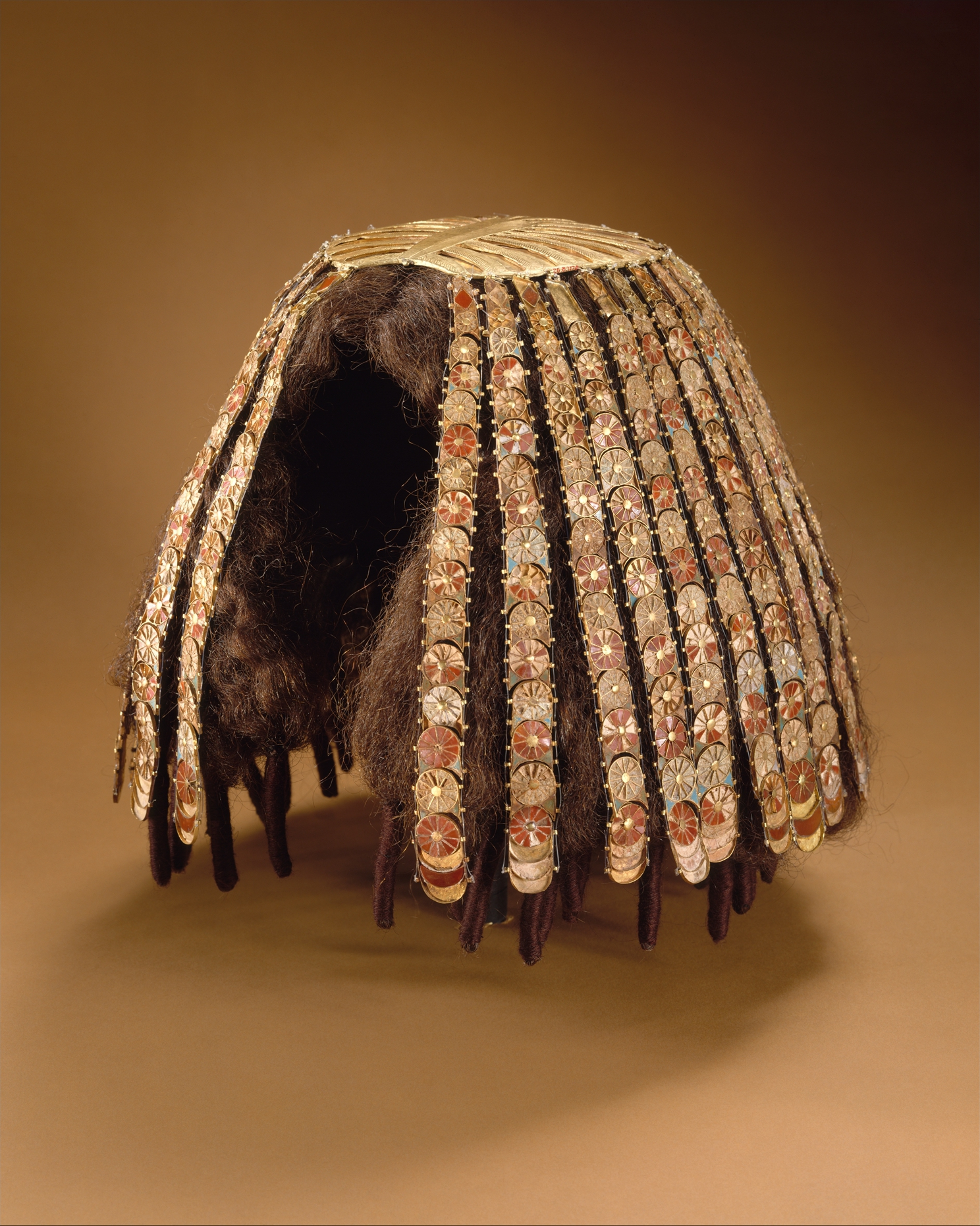
Wig cover, an approximate recreation (from original pieces). Made of gold, gesso, carnelian, glass and jasper.

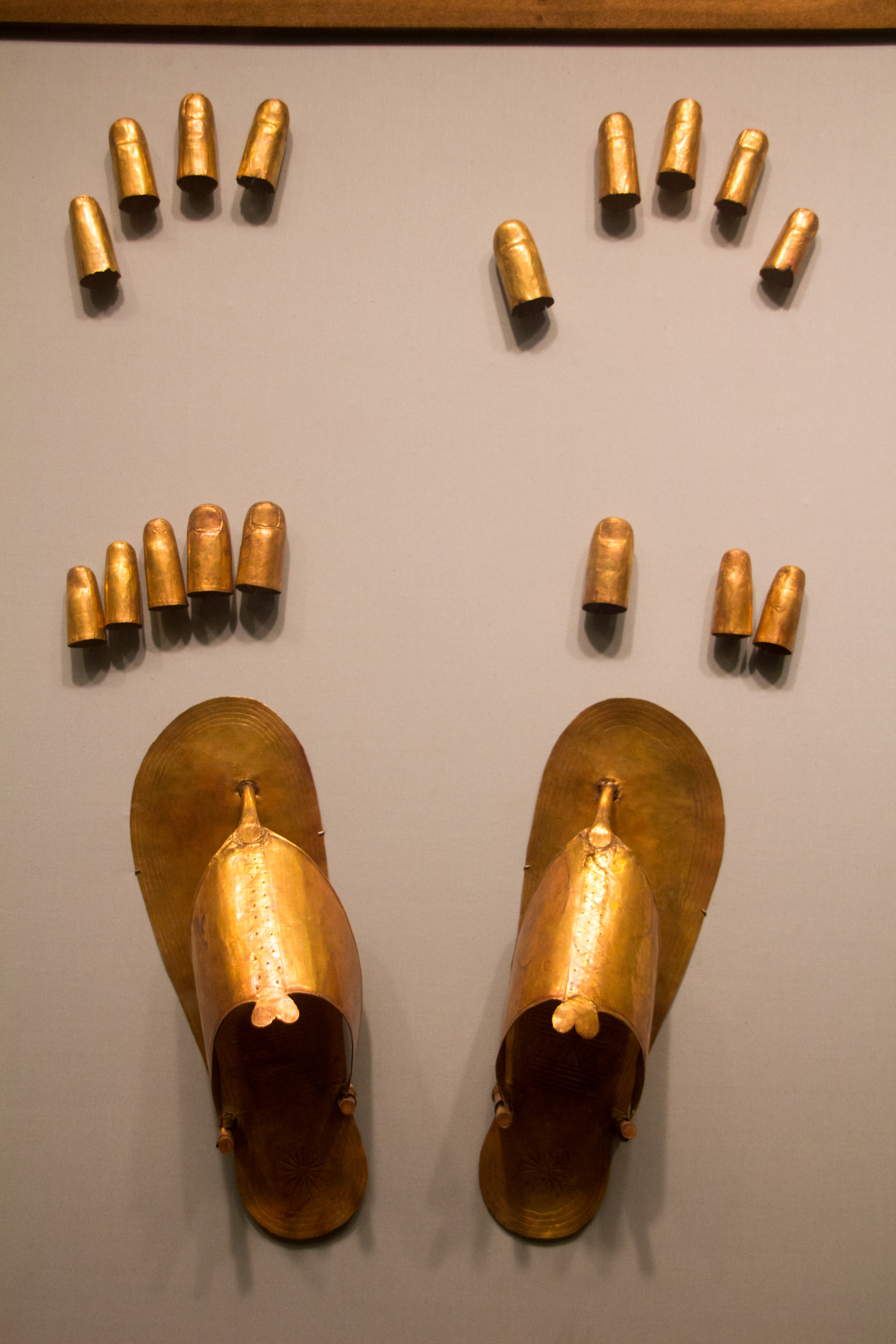
Egyptian finger and toe stalls, plus sandals, on display at the Metropolitan Museum of Art.

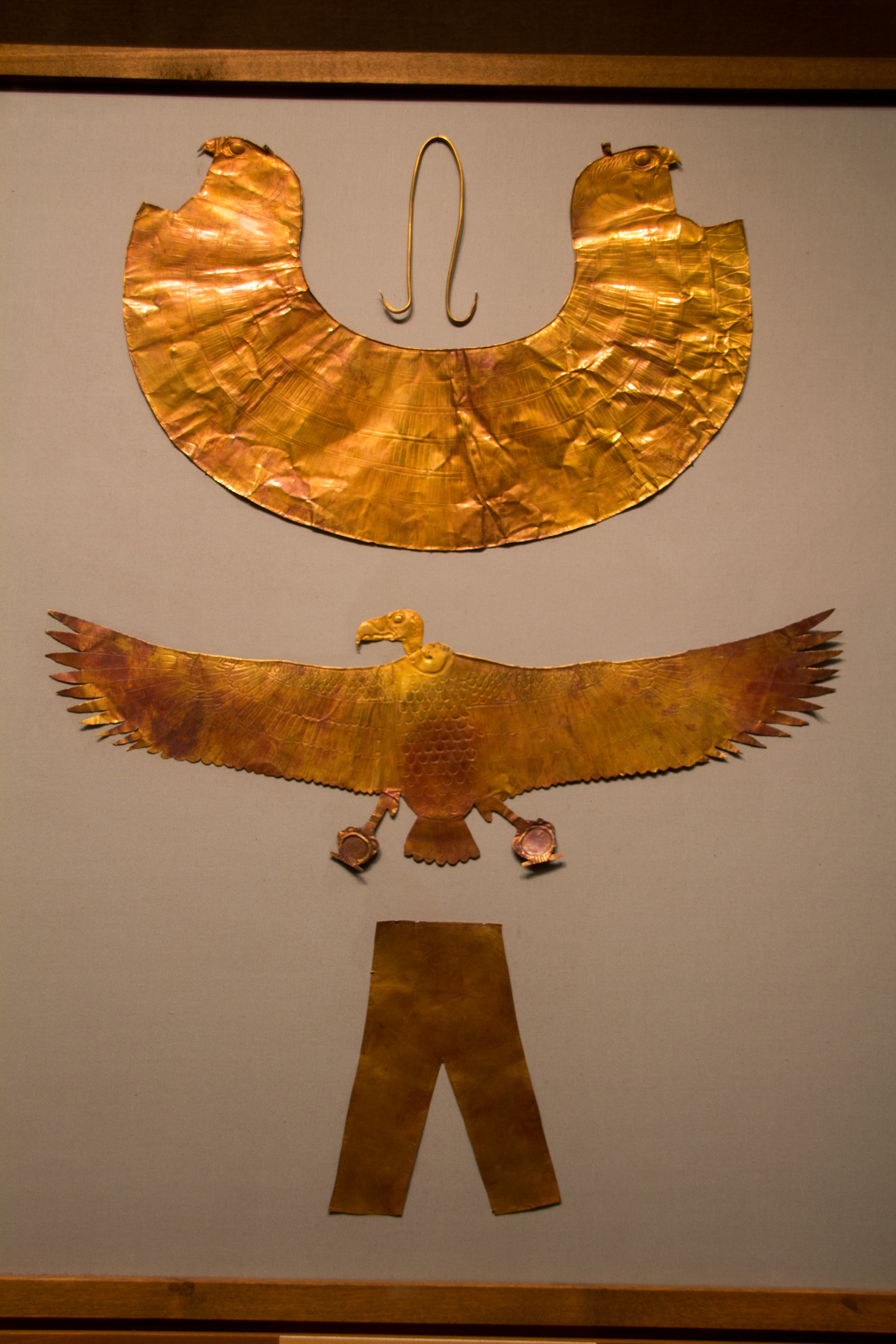
Sheet gold pectoral and other coverings.

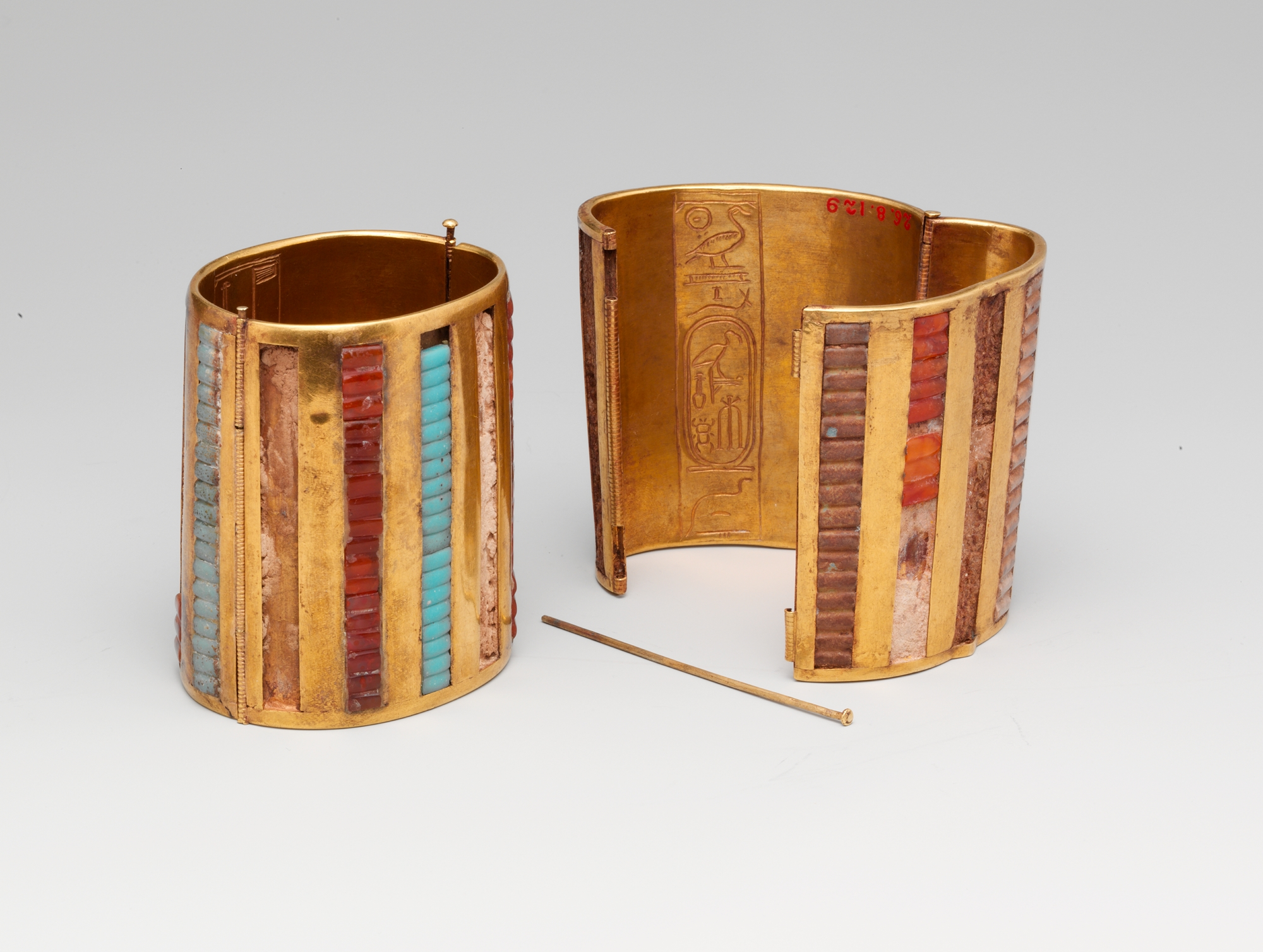
Hinged Cuff bracelet

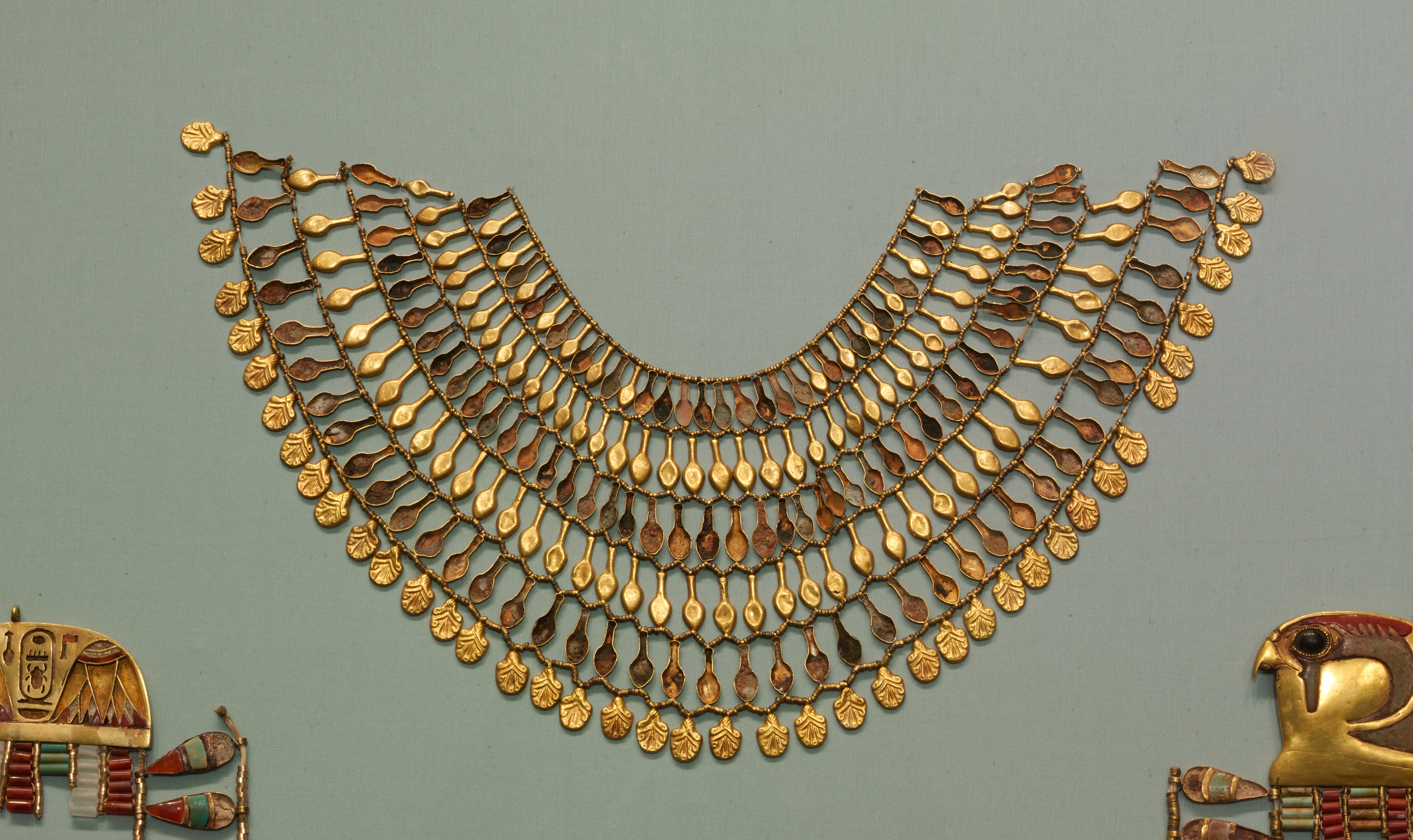
Broad Collar of Nefer Amulets
