= Tutankhamun's mummy =

Anatomical remains of the pharaoh

- The unwrapped mummy of Tutankhamun as photographed in 1926
- Location: KV62, Valley of the Kings
- Date discovered: 28 October 1925
- Excavated by: Howard Carter

The mummy of Tutankhamun was discovered by English Egyptologist Howard Carter and his team on 28 October 1925 in tomb KV62 in the Valley of the Kings. Tutankhamun was a pharaoh of the 18th Dynasty of the New Kingdom of Egypt, making his mummy over 3,300 years old. Tutankhamun's mummy is the only royal mummy to have been found entirely undisturbed.

The burial chamber was found in 1922, but was not opened until a year later. Two years passed between the discovery of the tomb and that of the mummy and its famous death mask. The discovery of the tomb was one of the most significant archaeological discoveries in modern times. There has been much speculation about the king's life and cause of death since very little about him is known.

== King Tutankhamun ==
Tutankhamun was the 13th pharaoh of the 18th Dynasty of the New Kingdom and ruled for about a decade c. 1355–1346 BCE. A majority of his reign was devoted to restoring Egyptian culture, including religious and political policies; his predecessor and father Akhenaten had altered many Egyptian cultural aspects during his reign, and one of Tutankhamun's many restoration policies included changing the political capital from Akhenaten's Amarna back to Memphis. After an initial examination of the 3,300-year-old mummy, it was estimated that Tutankhamun was a teenager of approximately 19 years of age when he died. Since it was believed that Tutankhamun became king as a child no more than ten years old, many refer to him as the "Boy-King" or "Child-King". Following the discovery of Tutankhamun's mummy, much debate has arisen as to his exact cause of death. This has led to numerous medical studies and procedures performed on his remains. As medical technology has advanced throughout the years, new techniques have been utilized on the mummy to discover the true age, genealogy, and cause of death of the young pharaoh, speculated by some to be from a blow to the head, battle wound, or a chariot accident, so that some of the mysteries surrounding the "Boy-King" might finally be resolved.

== Discovery of tomb and mummy ==
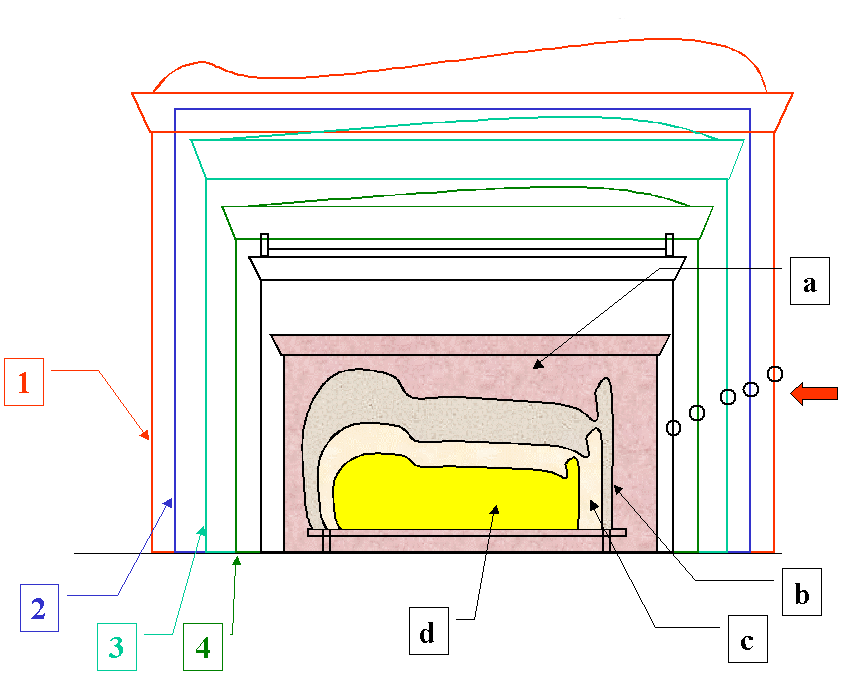
Cross-section of shrines and sarcophagi within the burial chamber

In 1914 Howard Carter and his sponsor George Herbert, 5th Earl of Carnarvon obtained the concession to excavate in the Valley of the Kings. Carter believed the Valley contained at least one more royal tomb, that of Tutankhamun. Excavators working for Theodore M. Davis, the previous holder of the concession, had discovered artefacts bearing his name clustered in the centre of the Valley, including the small pit tomb KV58, which Davis declared to be Tutankhamun's tomb. However, Carter believed that the king's tomb was still undiscovered, hidden under piles of debris from earlier excavations. Following a systematic clearance that began in 1917, Carter's team would discover the real tomb of Tutankhamun on 4 November 1922.

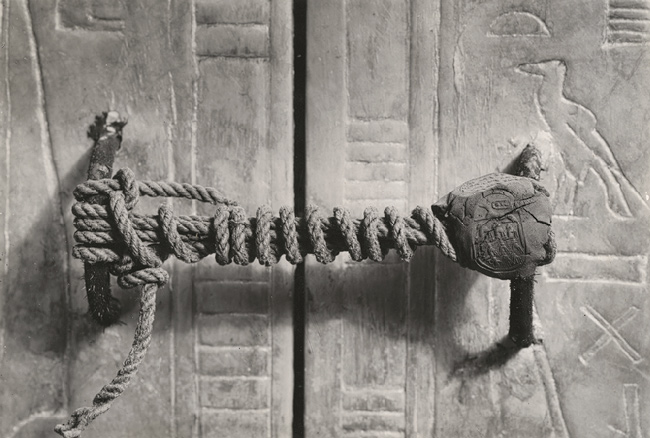
The unbroken seal securing the doors of the second or third shrine

The tomb was robbed twice in antiquity but much was left intact and some areas appeared to be unscathed. Ancient robbers had entered the burial chamber and unsealed the doors of the outermost of the series of shrines that surrounded Tutankhamun's sarcophagus. However, the doors of the second and third shrines were intact, sealed with stamped cords; the doors of the innermost shrine were left unsealed in antiquity. These unbroken seals, with no evidence of re-sealing, indicated that the 3,300 year old burial of the king was intact. Over the course of 80 days, the shrines were dismantled and removed from the chamber. On 3 January 1924, the doors of the third and fourth (innermost) shrines were opened, revealing the king's sarcophagus, of yellow quartzite with a granite lid tinted to match.

On 12 February 1924, the lid of the sarcophagus was raised in the presence of Egyptian government officials and Egyptologists. Within lay the 2.1-metre (7 ft) long outermost mummiform coffin of gilded wood, covered by linen shrouds. The shrouds were rolled back, revealing the coffin bore the portrait of the king, his face and hands of a lighter-coloured gold alloy than the rest of the coffin, said by Carter to convey "an impression of the greyness of death". Around the vulture and uraeus on his brow was a small floral wreath. The sarcophagus lid was left suspended, as a tour was scheduled for reporters the following day, along with the wives of Carter's collaborators. The visit of the wives was refused by government officials, a note from Mohammed Pasha Zaghlul informed Carter that the wives would need permission to visit. Carter and his team, citing "impossible restrictions and discourtesies" resigned in protest, closing the tomb and suspending work. Under the direction of the Egyptian government, Pierre Lacau was ordered to cut the locks on the tomb and secure the sarcophagus lid. After a series of events, including the cancellation of the excavation permit, his unsuccessfully suing of the Antiquities Service, and a lecture-tour of America, Carter would return to the excavation in late January 1925 after reaching a new agreement regarding the continued clearance of the tomb.

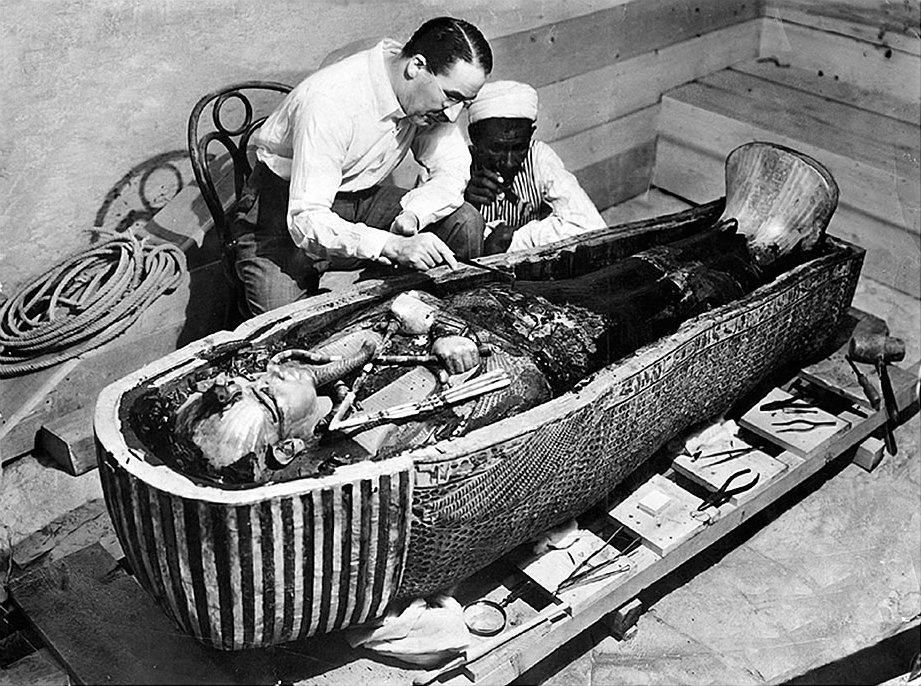
Howard Carter and one of his foremen clean the innermost coffin

The nested coffins were opened the following excavation season, in late 1925. The lid of the outermost coffin, secured by silver pins with gilded heads, was raised on its silver handles to reveal a second mummiform coffin, extensively inlaid with coloured glass, wreathed with floral garlands and shrouded in fine linen. This coffin showed signs of exposure to moisture, something that Carter found "disconcerting" as it indicated humidity within the coffins, suggesting the king's mummy would not be as well-preserved as hoped. This middle coffin fitted tightly within the outermost, lacked handles and was very heavy. The silver pins securing the lid were withdrawn as far as possible, wrapped with copper wire, and the basin of the outermost coffin was lowered back into the sarcophagus, leaving the middle coffin free, quickly being supported by a wooden tray. The pins were removed, and the lid raised by means of four metal eyelets screwed on to serve as handles. The innermost coffin, made of solid gold, was covered with a red shroud, save for the face, and wore a large floral collar. It was covered from chest to ankles with unguents, which filled the space between the two coffins and stuck them firmly together. The narrow space between the coffins meant the gold nails that secured the lid could not be withdrawn, and were instead removed in pieces with screwdrivers. On 28 October 1925, the lid was lifted, revealing the royal mummy.

=== The wrapped mummy ===
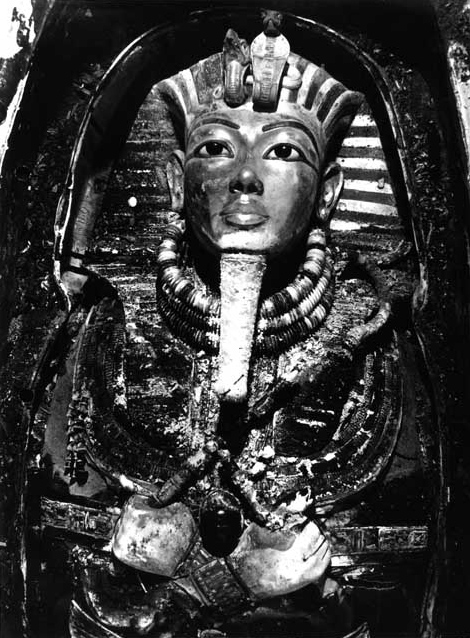
Closeup of Tutankhamun's mummy within the innermost coffin, as revealed in late October 1925

Tutankhamun's wrapped mummy, measuring 185 centimetres (6.07 ft) tall, fit exactly inside the 188 centimetres (6.17 ft) innermost coffin. The life-like curves of the body were reproduced with layers of padding beneath the tight outer shroud. Covering the head and shoulders of the mummy was a gold mask which had fallen back slightly. Characterised by Carter as a "beautiful and unique specimen of ancient portraiture" it depicts the king as the god Osiris with a curled divine beard and wearing the striped nemes-headdress with vulture and uraeus emblems at the brow. Over the shoulders, the mask takes the form of a broad collar with falcon-headed terminals. At the throat was a separate triple stranded necklace of faience, red and yellow gold disc beads. The mask is extensively inlaid with coloured glass, faience, and stones including lapis lazuli, carnelian, feldspar, and obsidian. The back of the mask is inscribed with Chapter 151b of the Book of the Dead.

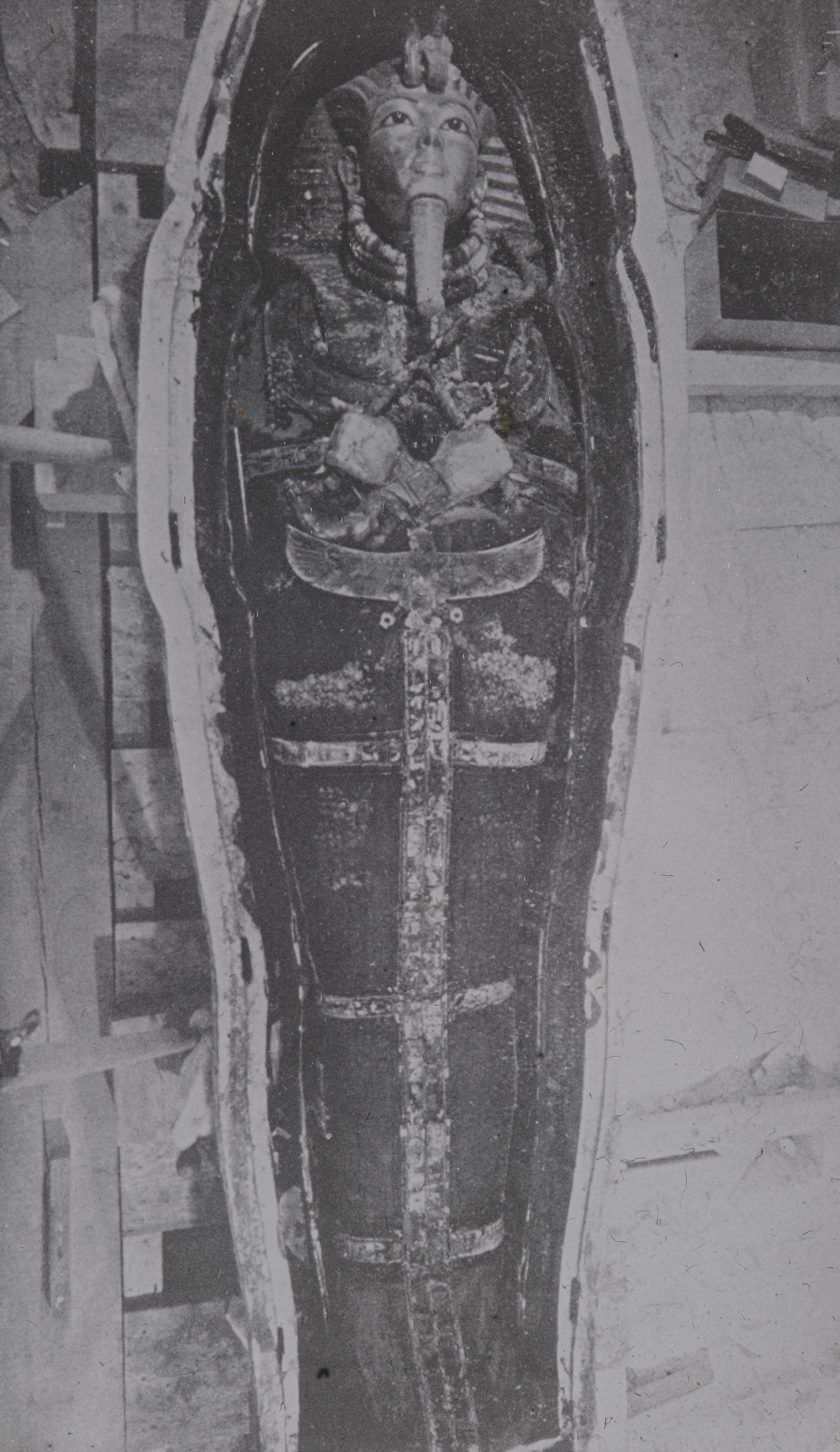
Tutankhamun's wrapped mummy in-situ

Sewn onto the shroud immediately below the mask were a pair of separate gold hands, holding a decayed crook and flail. Between the hands sat a large resin scarab, bearing the image of the Bennu-bird and inscribed with Chapter 29b of the Book of the Dead, suspended on flexible straps. Below these were gold mummy bands with inlaid text, originating from a large gold ba-bird with outstretched wings. The mummy bands were constructed of separate gold plaques linked together along the sides by strings of tiny beads. They overlaid the vertical and horizontal fabric bands that secured the shroud at the centre front, biceps, hips, knees, and ankles. The text of the single central vertical band has speeches by Nut and Geb while the four horizontal bands declare the deceased king is "honoured before" the funerary deities Anubis, Osiris, Hapi, Qebehsenuef, and Duamutef. Along the sides were ornate straps attached to the horizontal bands and made of inlaid plaques in the forms of djeds, tyets, uraei, and cartouches. The bands were originally prepared for Tutankhamun's predecessor Neferneferuaten and later altered to fit Tutankhamun.

Carter estimated that "something like two bucketsful" of unguents had been poured over the mummy; the mask and feet had been carefully avoided. The body lay at a slight angle within the coffin. The level of dark unguents differed between the right and left sides, suggesting that the coffin had tilted, presumably while being lowered into the sarcophagus. The liquids were a source of humidity within the closed coffins. Additionally, they had undergone a chemical reaction, characterised by Carter as "a kind of slow spontaneous combustion", which carbonised the linen wrappings. The combination of heat and humidity had negatively affected the trappings of the mummy too. The crook and flail had disintegrated, the resin scarab was cracked, and the threads securing the separate hands and mummy bands were decayed, rendering the whole assemblage very fragile. Furthermore, the unguents had hardened over the millennia, sticking the mummy and mask to the bottom of the coffin. Attempts were made to separate the mummy from the inner and middle coffin troughs by placing them in the midday sun for several hours, with the temperature reaching 65 °C (149 °F). However, the mummy remained stuck to the coffin so the initial examination was carried out in situ.

== Initial examination ==
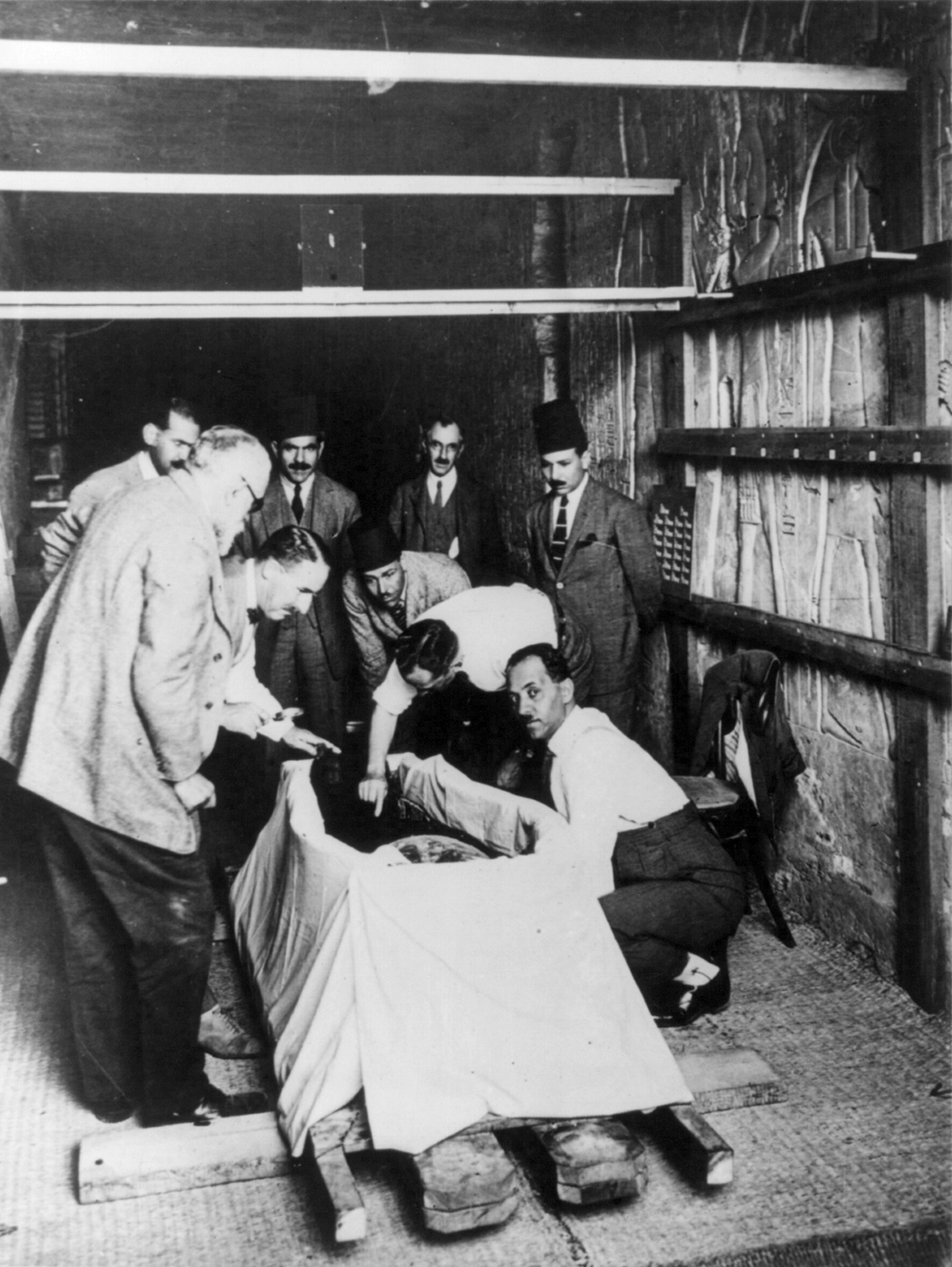
Anatomist Douglas Derry makes the first incision into the wrappings of Tutankhamun's mummy.

The unwrapping and examination of Tutankhamun's mummy began at 9:45 am on 11 November 1925 in the outer corridor of tomb KV15. Carter had intended the examination to take place at the start of the excavation season in October but it had been delayed by a month to allow Pierre Lacau to attend. It was conducted by the anatomists Douglas Derry, the professor of anatomy at Cairo's School of Medicine, and Saleh Hamdi Bey, the former head of the same school. Those present on the first day included government officials, Egyptologists, and members of Carter's team. The external ornaments of the mummy had been removed, except for the firmly-stuck mask. This examination was an unprecedented opportunity to study the methods and techniques used in the wrapping of a royal mummy. However, the outermost layers of linen were very fragile making it immediately apparent that "no orderly unwrapping was possible". Instead, the fabric was stabilised with a very thin layer of liquid paraffin wax before a central incision was made from the edge of the mask to the ankles, and the fabric was peeled back and removed in pieces.

The first part of Tutankhamun's mummy to be exposed was his lower legs and feet, with the examination being carried out from the feet upwards. The removal of the top layers of bandages exposed the first of the many objects included within the wrappings of the king's mummy. The examination slowed to allow the careful exposure, recording, and photographing of the items.

The inner bandages were in worse condition than the exterior layers, having been reduced to dust. As a result, the exact wrapping method and arrangement of the padding and sheets was for the most part "impossible to follow". In general, the wrapping techniques and methods conformed to what was seen on other noble mummies of the same era. Large quantities of folded linen pads were used over the torso and thighs to provide shape. The outermost and innermost bandages were of extremely fine linen while the middle layers of bandages were of coarser fabric. Elaborate bandaging was noted over the shoulders and chest, with bandages criss-crossed over the shoulders and around the torso; a similar arrangement was seen around the groin. The limbs were first separately wrapped, as were the fingers and toes, which were capped with gold finger and toe stalls, placed after the first layers of bandages were applied. On the feet were gold foil sandals.

It was hoped that Tutankhamun's mummy could be separated from the coffin by removing some of the outer layers of bandaging. However, the resins and unguents had penetrated the wrappings, adhering the body itself to the coffin. Ultimately, the body had to be chiseled out. The torso was cut in half at the level of the hips to remove the pelvis and legs from the coffin. The arms were disarticulated at the shoulders, elbows, and wrists in order to continue the unwrapping of the torso and to remove bracelets; each body part was treated with hot paraffin wax to stabilise it. The hands and feet were later reattached with resin. Lastly, hot knives were used to remove the head and neck from the mask. To view the condition of the teeth, Derry made an incision around the inner edge of the jaw and across the throat; this damage was repaired with resin. This thorough disarticulation of the body gave clear views of the ends of each of the relevant bones, allowing the anatomists to make an accurate estimate of the king's age. Tutankhamun was estimated to be eighteen at the time of his death and of slight build, with a projected height in life of 168 centimetres (5.51 ft).

The examination of Tutankhamun's mummy concluded on 19 November 1925. The dismembered mummy was placed on a wooden tray filled with sand, surrounded by a packing of cotton wool and fabric bandages. The beaded linen skull-cap on the head and broad collar on the chest were treated with a layer of wax and left in place. The body was returned to the outermost coffin within the sarcophagus on the morning of 23 October 1926.

=== Description of the mummy ===
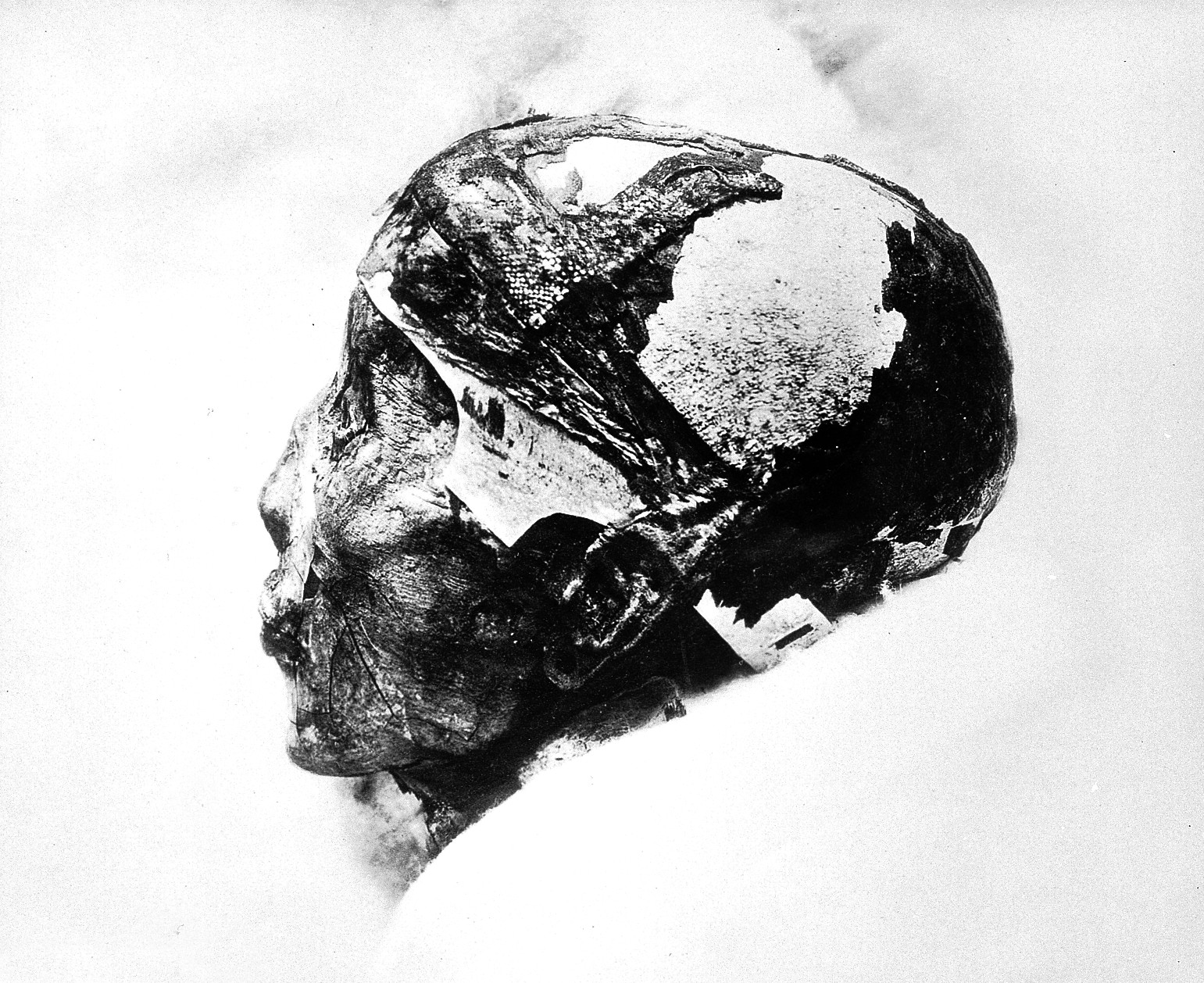
Tutankhamun's mummified head wearing a cap with beaded uraei with the names of the Aten at the centres of their hoods.

The body was in very poor condition, described by Derry as being a "greyish-white colour, very brittle and exhibiting numerous cracks". Spots of natron, the drying agent used in the mummification process, were present on the head and shoulders. Tutankhamun's face, when finally revealed, had a "serene and placid countenance", recognisable from his monuments. He was noted as bearing a close resemblance to the KV55 mummy, having the same uncommon broad and low (platycephalic) skull shape. This similarity indicated a close genetic relationship to the royal line; it was previously thought he had gained the throne only through marriage to Akhenaten's daughter Ankhesenamun. His head was shaved, and wore a tight-fitting linen cap with a gold brow-band and a beaded design of uraei. The eyes, with long eyelashes, were partly open; no padding had been placed in the orbits. The nose was flattened by the layers of bandaging and the nostrils were plugged with rolls of resin-soaked linen. The brain had been removed through the nose and resin introduced into the skull cavity. The top lip had drawn back a little to reveal large front teeth smeared with resin. The face was clean-shaven; on the left cheek near the ear was a "rounded depression...resembling a scab". His ears were pierced for earrings, the hole measuring 7.5 millimetres (0.30 in) in diameter.

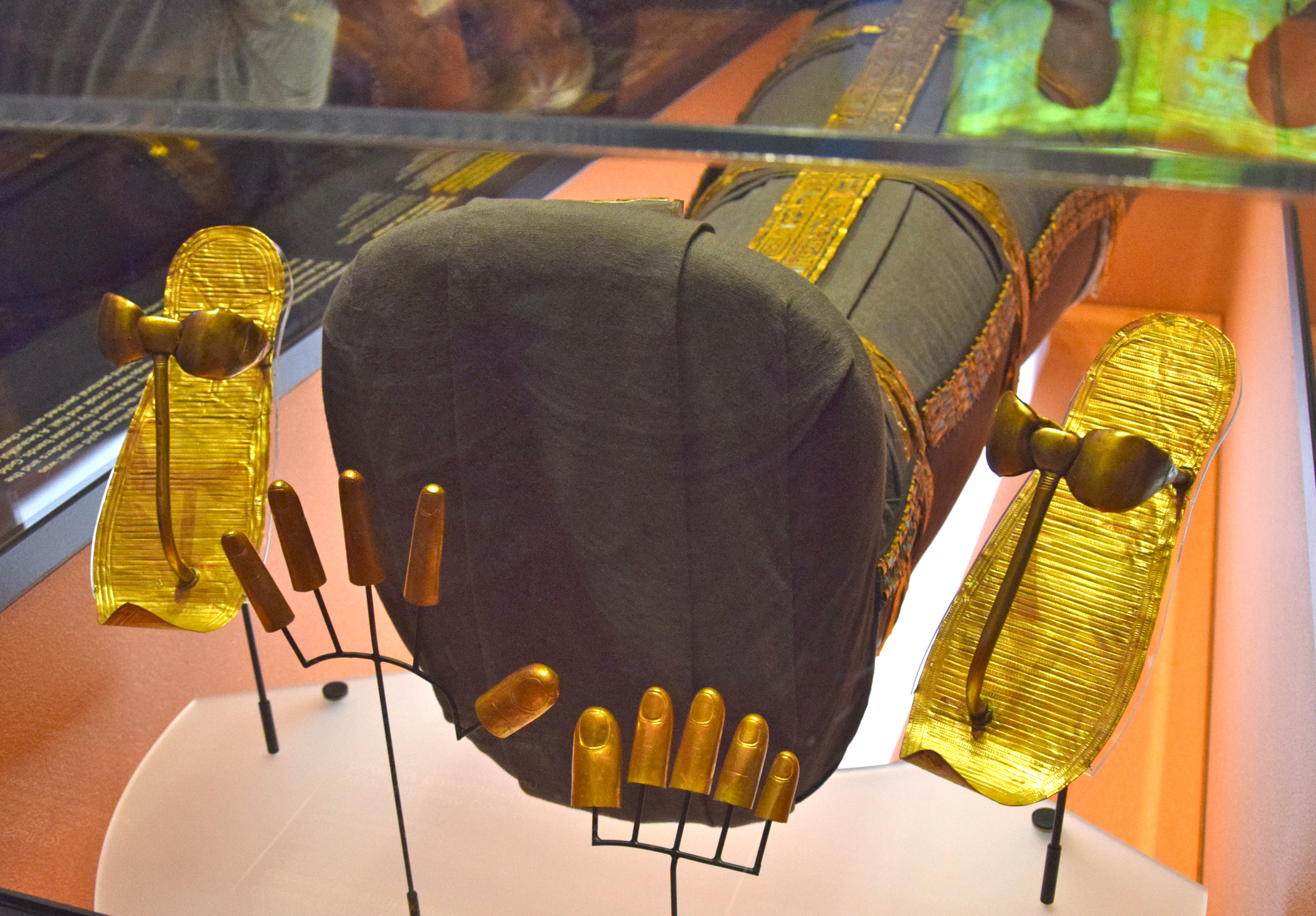
Gold foil sandals, and a half-set of finger and toe stalls

The chest was covered by a large bib-like broad collar of small blue and yellow glass beads edged with gold sequins and drop beads. The arms were bent at the elbows and the forearms positioned parallel, left over right, over the torso. The fingers were sheathed in gold stalls. The organs were removed through an embalming incision approximately 86 millimetres (3.4 in) long, running from the navel to the left hip bone. This location is different to other royal mummies of that time period, who have the incision running from hip to groin. This cut was covered by an embalming plate, although not placed directly on the skin but in the bandage layers above. The body cavity packed with resin-soaked linen. The king's penis was wrapped separately and placed into an erect (ithyphallic) position, held in place by the crossed bandages; Derry could not say if he was circumcised. No pubic hair was evident, and the scrotum was flattened against the perineum. The toes were covered by gold stalls and the feet wore gold sandals.

=== Objects within the wrappings ===
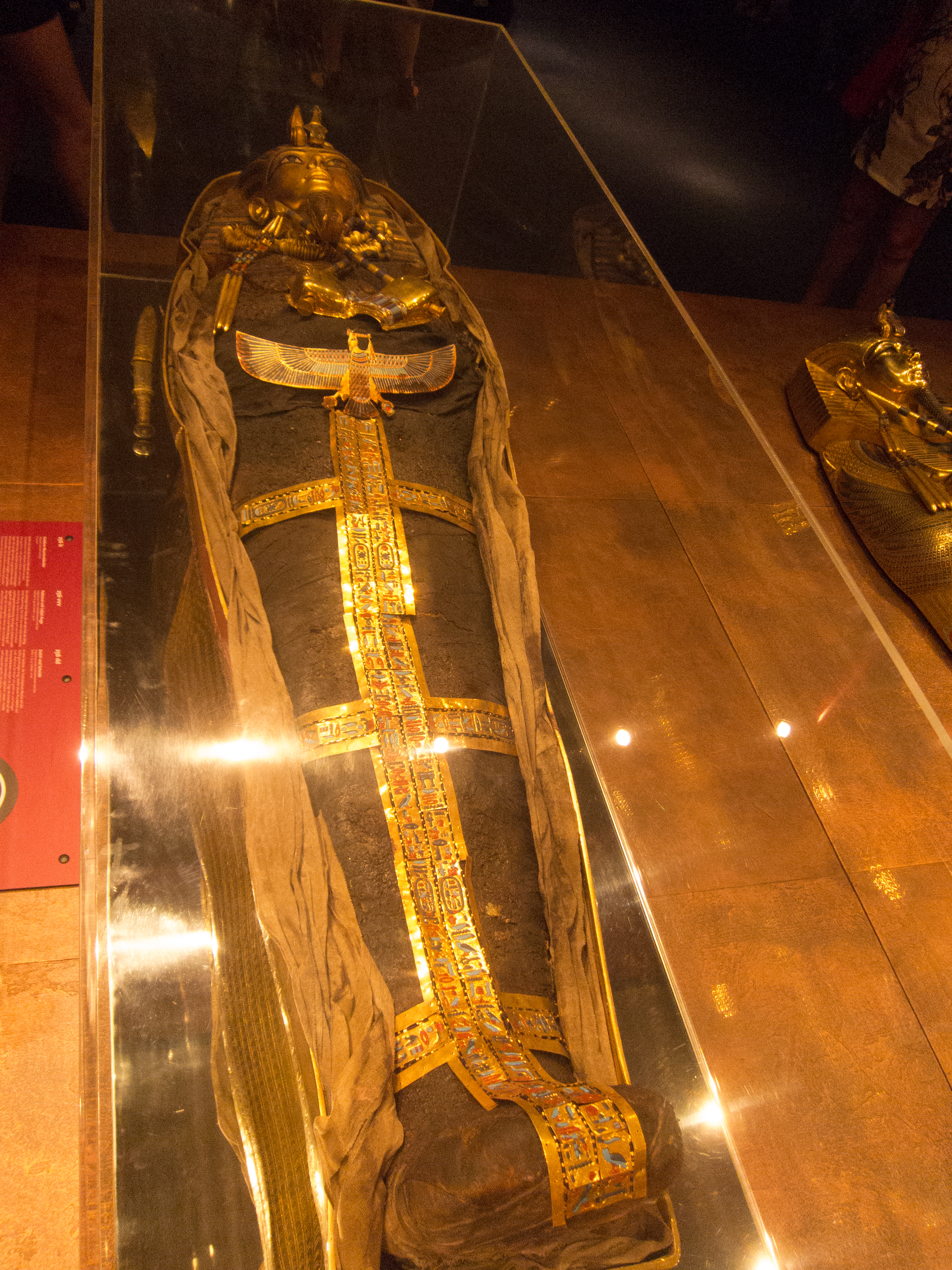
Replica of the mummy with reproduction trappings

Within the layers of bandaging on the royal mummy, 150 objects were included. They were distributed across many bandage layers and were often grouped together. They included personal jewellery worn by the king in life; ceremonial items of clothing; weapons; and funerary jewellery and amulets, the quantity, materials, and positions of which were dictated by the Book of the Dead, to protect and assist the deceased king in his journey to the afterlife.

In the bandage layers of the head, Tutankhamun wore various forms of headwear including an inlaid gold fillet and a padded khat-headdress with a gold brow band, flexible gold uraeus, and Nekhbet-vulture with open wings across the top of the head. An iron headrest amulet was found at the back of the head and a four-stranded bead necklace was across the throat.

Around his neck were twenty amulets of various forms and materials including stones such as a red jasper tyet, a green feldspar was-sceptre, and a carnelian snake head, all suspended on gold wires. Eight further amulets were of sheet gold in various forms including uraei, vultures, and a human-headed winged snake, were tied around the neck by strings. The chest and upper torso was covered in thirty-five objects such as sheet gold collars; flexible inlaid collars; a resin scarab on a long wire; bracelets; and large pectoral necklaces distributed over thirteen bandage layers.

Tutankhamun's forearms were covered from elbow to wrist with 11 bracelets (seven on the right arm and six on the left), all of which were likely worn in life, and bore devices of scarabs, eyes of Horus, and display a wide variety of techniques and materials. Rings of various materials including gold, stone, and resin were also included in the wrappings, with a group of five over the right wrist, and eight beside the left wrist. Tutankhamun wore two gold rings on the middle and ring fingers of his left hand; the bezels depict a kneeling king presenting a figure of the goddess Maat, and a lunar barque atop a lapis lazuli background respectively.

On the abdomen were Y and T-shaped sheet gold amulets; several necklaces, including a broad collar of dark blue faience beads; a bracelet or armlet; and a bead girdle. Around his waist and hips were two gold foil girdles with ceremonial tails; each had an associated kilt apron laid over the thighs (one of beadwork, and one of flexible inlaid gold plates) and dagger on the right side. One of these daggers had an iron blade, now known to be made of meteoric iron. Additionally, seven bracelets or armlets and four inlaid collars were placed over the knees and shins.

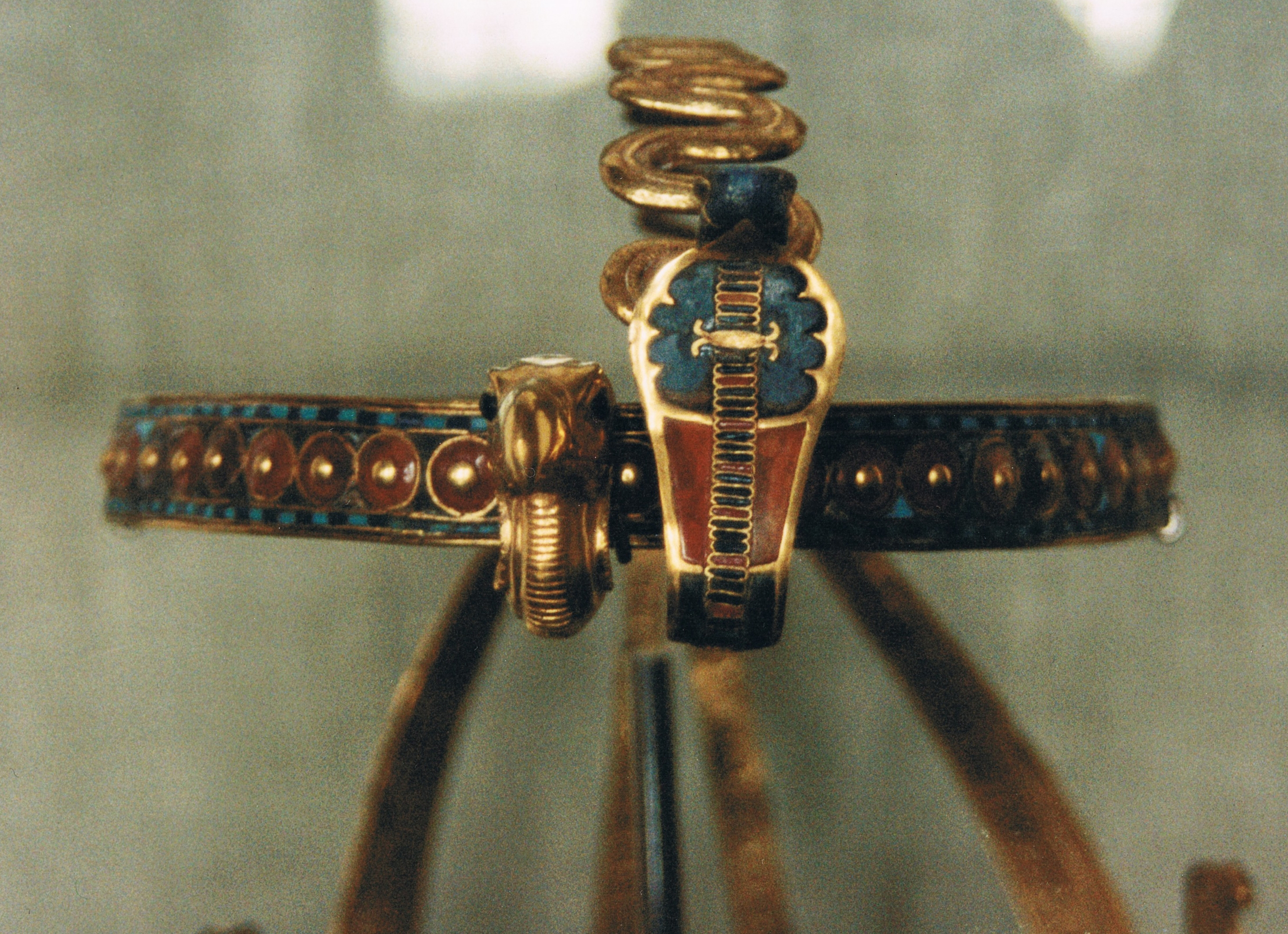
Inlaid fillet or diadem from the wrappings of the head

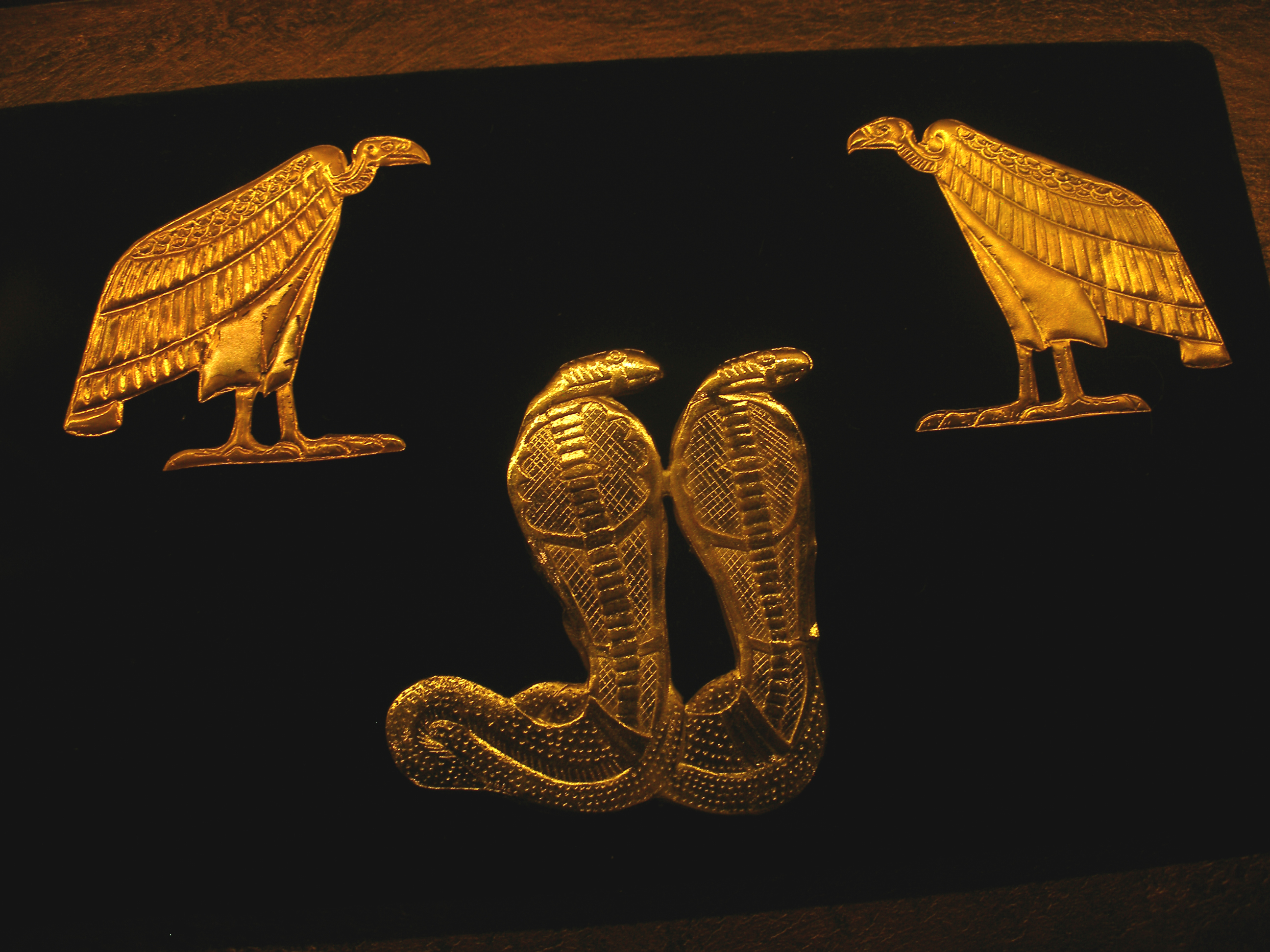
Vulture and snake gold-foil amulets, placed over the throat

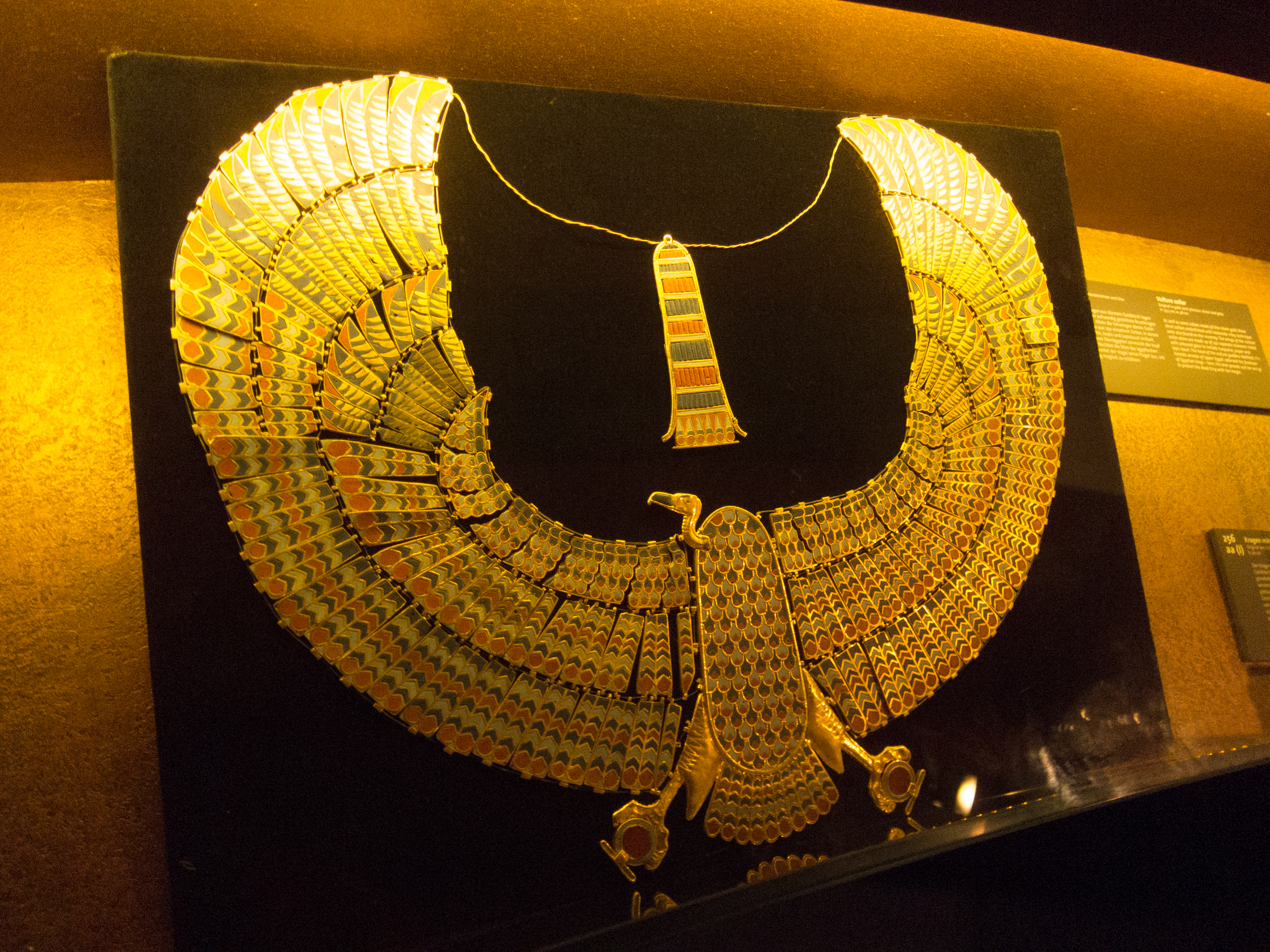
Flexible inlaid vulture collar found on the chest

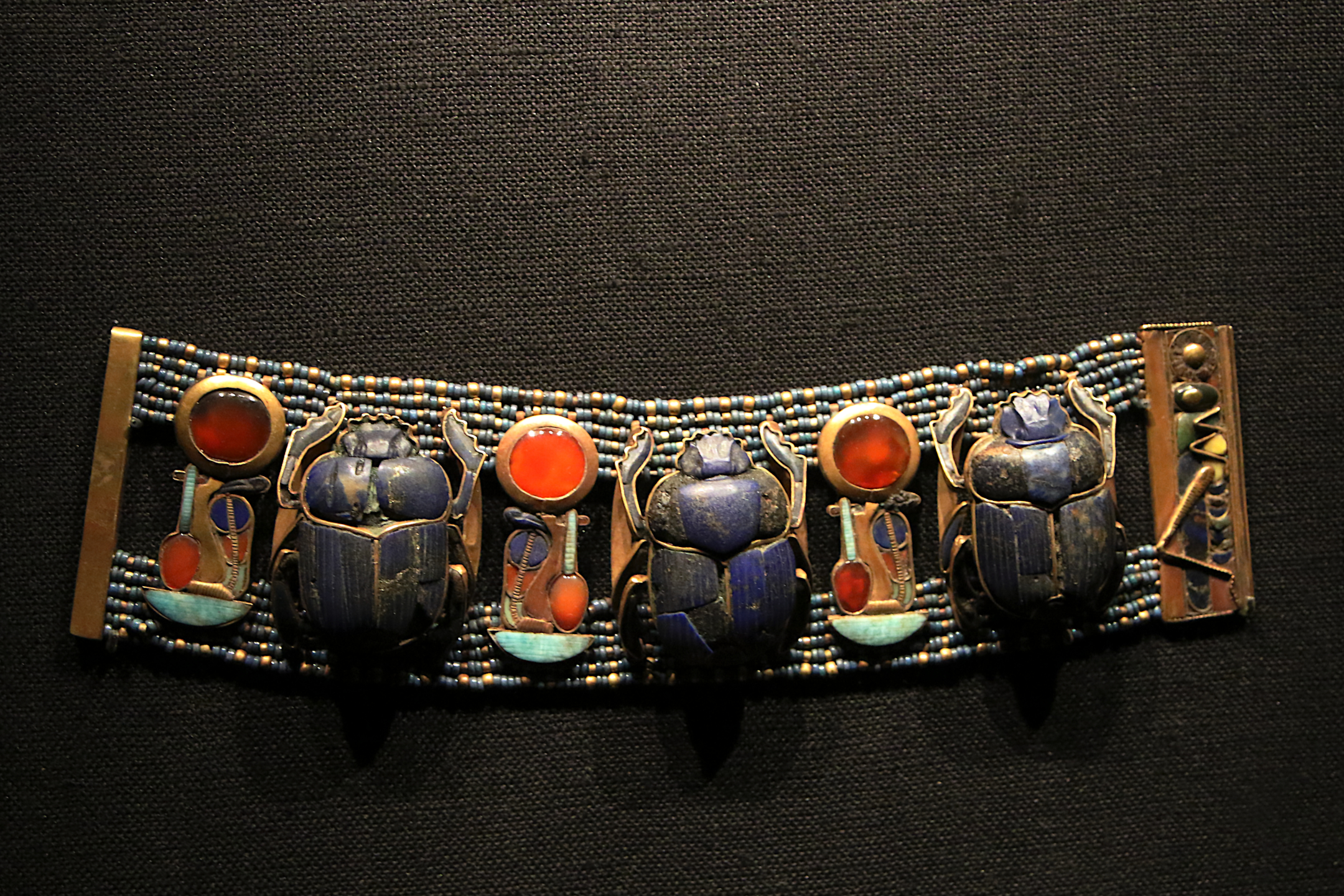
Bracelet with scarab and uraei motif, found on the king's right arm

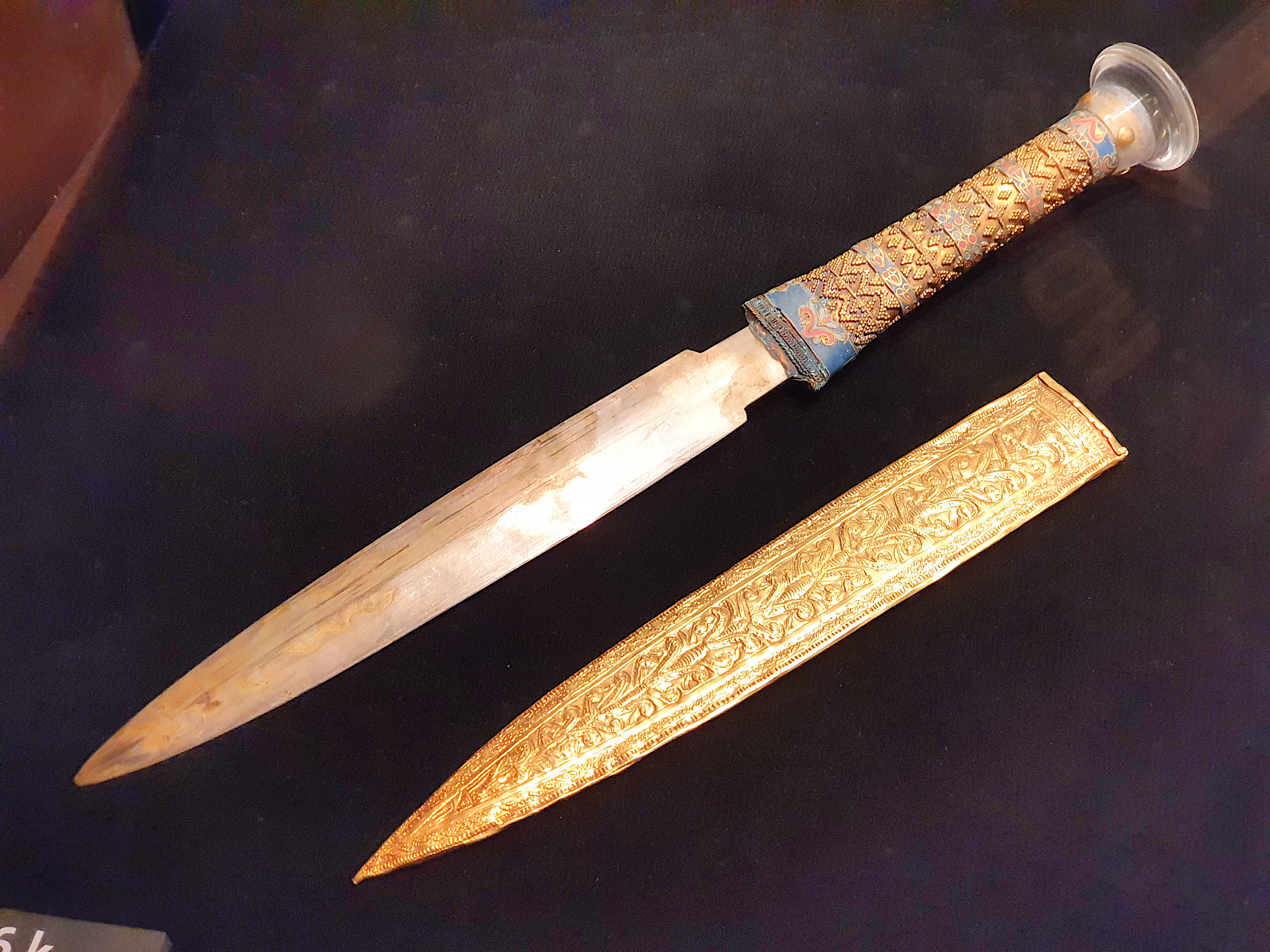
Replica of the iron-bladed dagger, placed near the right hip

== Later studies ==
=== 1968 X-rays ===
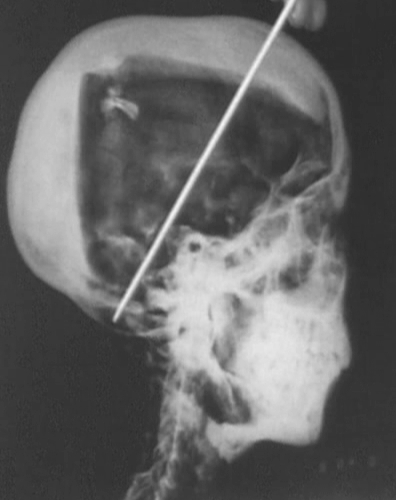
X-ray of Tutankhamun's head showing two levels of resin inside the skull

In 1968 R. G. Harrison, a professor of anatomy, used a portable X-ray machine to re-examine the mummy of Tutankhamun. Harrison quickly discovered that Carter had dismembered the mummy, something that is not mentioned in his publication but visible in photographs of the unwrapping. The mummy, surrounded by cotton wool and secured by modern bandages, had deteriorated since last photographed by Carter's team in 1926. The beaded skull-cap had disappeared, as had most of the skin on the head. The eyes appeared to be wide open as the eyelids had been destroyed, and the ears were broken off. The ribs had been sawn off and the front of the king's chest, including sternum and clavicles, had been removed. Stray beads from the large beaded collar were seen scattered in the torso on the X-rays. The limbs had been moved and further disarticulated, with the left hand and thumb of the right hand found in the sand under the body, and some of the digits on the hands and feet were missing. Although not mentioned by Harrison, the king's penis was also missing. The additional damage to the mummy and the removal of the skullcap and collar likely occurred during the Second World War, and components suggested to be from the collar have since appeared on the antiquities market.

The X-rays revealed two levels of resin inside the skull. One was introduced when the body was lying on its back, pooling at the back of the head; the other when the head was tilted far back, settling at the top of the skull. Also present in the skull cavity were small bone fragments which Harrison initially believed to be the result of the embalming process. The fact that skull fragments were discovered led many to assume the king was murdered by a blow to the head, but the X-ray could not support or discredit this theory. His age at death was again estimated to be around 18, with a projected height in life of 168.9 centimetres (5 ft 6.5 in). Serological analysis undertaken by the same team determined that Tutankhamun and the KV55 mummy had the same blood group, further indicating a familial relationship.

=== 1978 examination ===
The mummy was examined again in 1978 by American orthodontist James E. Harris, in order to obtain a better X-ray of the king's skull. While Harris ultimately did not publish anything about his examination, it apparently did not yield further information regarding the condition of the king's mummy, although still photos taken at the time and released to the public confirmed the findings of the 1968 Harrison team.

=== 2005 CT scan ===
On January 15, 2005, under the direction of Zahi Hawass, Tutankhamun's mummy was removed from his tomb and CT scanned using a portable machine. The scan allowed for accurate forensic reconstruction of his body and face, as well as further evidence of his cause of death. The results showed that the bone fragments inside the skull had moved, indicating that traumatic injury to the head happened after death, and murder due to blunt force trauma was ruled out. He also had a small cleft palate that probably went unnoticed, and the elongated shape of his skull was within the normal range and appeared to be a family trait. Based on bone maturity and his wisdom teeth, Tutankhamun was confirmed to be 19 years old at the time of his death. The CT scan proved Tutankhamun was in good health and did not show any signs of disease. The study suggested that a previously unnoticed leg fracture may have contributed to his death.

=== DNA testing ===
From September 2007 to October 2009, eleven royal mummies of the New Kingdom's 18th Dynasty underwent extensive genetic and radiological testing. A team of doctors, under the leadership of Hawass, took DNA samples from bone tissue of the eleven mummies to determine a family pedigree and to determine if any familial or pathological diseases caused Tutankhamun's death. The study was able to provide a five-generation pedigree, and the KV55 mummy and the KV35 Younger Lady were identified as Tutankhamun's sibling parents. Four of the mummies, including Tutankhamun, were shown to have had malaria. Based on all the data, the study concluded the most likely cause of death for the young king was the combination of avascular necrosis, malaria and a leg fracture.

== Health ==
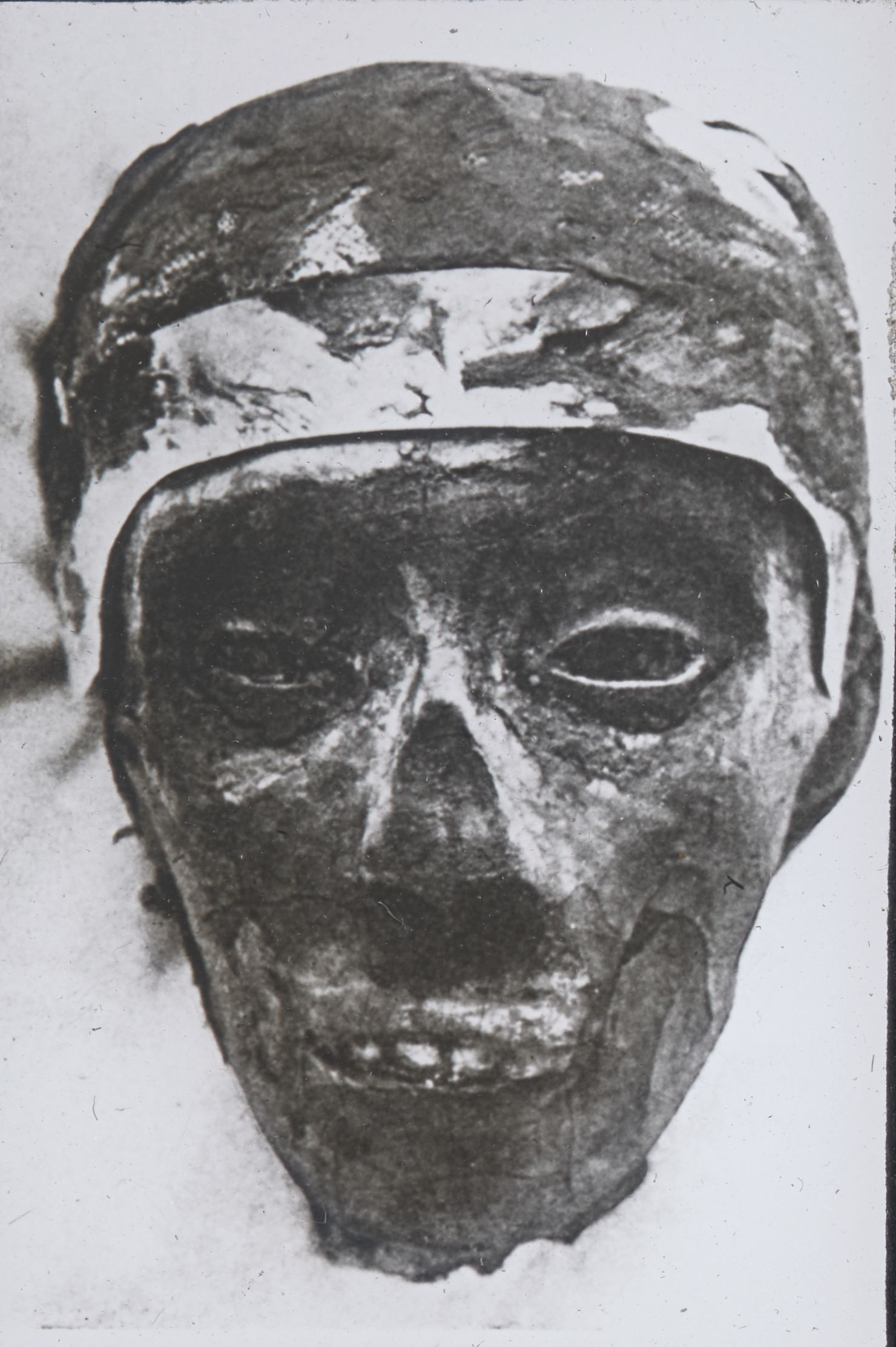
The face of Tutankhamun's mummy, as revealed in late October 1925, before subsequent deterioration.

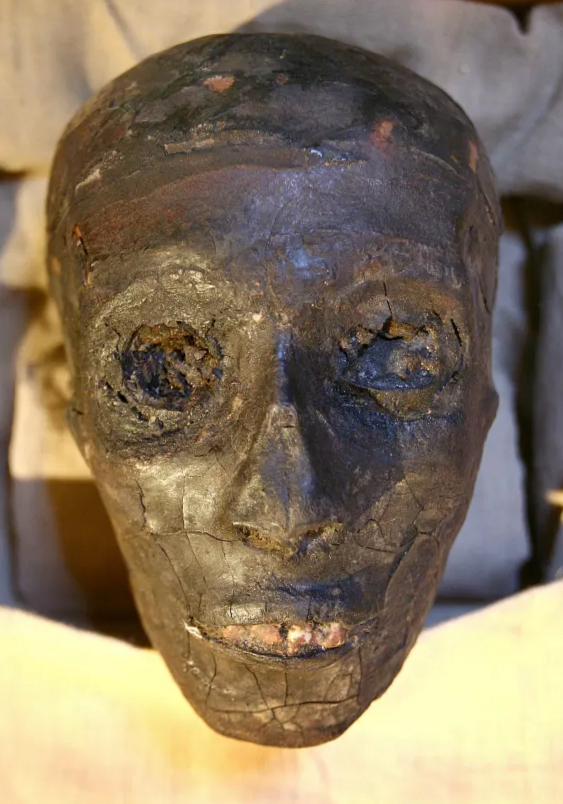
The face of Tutankhamun's mummy, in November 2025.

Tutankhamun's mummy has been studied to provide more information about his general health and to look for any conditions that may have contributed to his death. Analysis of the body is complicated by the poor condition of the mummy and damage sustained during its disarticulation. The many varying results of the studies "highlight the complexities of palaeopathology: how a single individual, who has been studied in detail by so many groups, can yield so many and sometimes contradictory" results.

The initial 1925 examination did not mention any signs of disease, and the first X-ray study ruled out tuberculosis. Subsequently, a wide variety of health conditions have been proposed for Tutankhamun, based on both his unusual depiction in art and his mummy. The theorised conditions are many and varied; those that involve internal organs or soft tissue are hard to prove due to their mummified state. Those that affect fertility such as an adrenal tumor, Klinefelter syndrome, or Fröhlich syndrome (adiposogenital dystrophy) are disproven by his fathering of two daughters. Disorders that produce gynecomastia such as aromatase excess syndrome, or the proposed "Tutankhamun syndrome", or affect the ribs and sternum such as pectus carinatum (pigeon chest) cannot be proven as the front wall of the chest is missing. His skull shape, although unusual, shows no signs of resulting from Antley–Bixler syndrome or Marfan syndrome. Inherited temporal lobe epilepsy, suggested to explain the increased religiosity in the reigns of his immediate predecessors and their early deaths, has little physical evidence to support it.

In 2010, a team led by Zahi Hawass diagnosed Tutankhamun with a clubbed left foot with avascular necrosis of the second and third metatarsals (Köhler disease II). However, the diagnosis of clubfoot is disputed. The 1960s X-ray report noted no abnormalities and characterises both feet as "cramped" by bandaging. James Gamble suggests that the foot is not clubbed but a result of Tutankhamun habitually walking on the outside of his foot due to the pain caused by the necrosis. Depictions of Tutankhamun doing archery while seated and the presence of 130 canes in the tomb was used as evidence to support Hawass's claim that Tutankhamun had a walking impairment. However, both are indications of prestige, not a reflection of their owner's health. Depictions of kings shooting while seated date back to the Old Kingdom and canes were common symbols of status in ancient Egypt and frequently included in burials. The canes show no sign of heavy use and his footwear shows even wear on both feet.

DNA testing revealed the presence of Plasmodium falciparum, the most severe type of malaria.

== Cause of death ==
Since the discovery of Tutankhamun's mummy, there has been much speculation and many theories on the exact cause of death, which until recent studies had been hard to prove with the evidence and data available. While it was a widely debated topic for many Egyptologists, it had also spread to the general public as popular culture has come up with many conspiracy theories that played out in movies, TV shows, and fictional books. Author James Patterson has even recently written his own take in his book, The Murder of King Tut. There are many educated and respected Egyptologists as well as trained professionals in other fields who have researched Tutankhamun and who hold varying beliefs as to his cause of death.

The initial examination of the mummy reported the body showed "no traces of the cause or causes of the young king's death". Bone fragments seen inside the skull in the 1960s X-rays led Harrison to propose that Tutankhamun died from a blow to the head. This has led to "endless speculation as to whether (or how) the king was brutally attacked or murdered", with Tutankhamun's vizier Ay considered the most likely culprit as he stood to gain the most from the young king's early death and ultimately succeeded him as pharaoh. A violent murder is ruled out because it is now known that they are a result of the mummy's modern unwrapping as the fragments are loose inside the skull and there is no evidence of bone thinning or calcified membranes indicative of a fatal blow to the head. Death as a result of a brain tumor was also not supported by anatomical studies.

An accidental death is often suggested, with varying causes. A chariot crash resulting in either a fatal fall or being run over, a kick from a horse, or trauma sustained in an attack by a hippopotamus are all put forward to explain his early death and the apparent trauma to his chest. Frank Rühli and Salima Ikram consider the latter two theories unlikely. They suggest that as the king was apparently an experienced charioteer (six were found in his tomb), he would be unlikely to stand in range of a horse kick. Additionally, even if a hippo was encountered, his bodyguards would have protected him; Thutmose III was protected by his guards from an attacking elephant while hunting.

The 2010 study attributed Tutankhamun's early death to a combination of multiple factors including a leg fracture and malaria. The fracture of the left leg has resin within it, indicating an associated open wound was present at the time of death. They suggest that the fracture was the result of a fall, and turned fatal either through infection or in combination with a severe malarial infection. However, Christian Timmann and Christian Meyer argue that sickle cell anemia better fits the pathologies exhibited by the king. They suggest that the sickle-cell disease turned fatal when Tutankhamun also contracted severe malaria. He is expected to have been homozygous recessive for the sickle cell gene, thus making him not immune to severe malaria, which would have been fatal. This suggestion has been called "interesting and plausible" by the Egyptian team.

== Mummification style ==
Regardless of the exact cause, it is clear that the young king's death was unexpected. The placement of the mummy's embalming incision is unique. This, combined with the two levels of resin inside his skull, have led to suggestions that an initial mummification was carried out by an inexperienced embalmer. His arms are crossed horizontally over the torso instead of diagonally over the chest, and his penis was embalmed in an erect position. Salima Ikram has suggested that these variations are deliberate, reflecting the restoration of traditional ancient Egyptian religion during his reign. The position of his arms, with elbows jutting, combined with his ithyphallic pose and the copious use of dark oils and resins, make the dead king into the image of Osiris, god of the dead and regeneration. Marianne Eaton-Krauss cautions that royal mummifications were not standardised in the Eighteenth Dynasty and the known mummies of rulers closest to Tutankhamun, those of Amenhotep III and the KV55 mummy, are largely skeletonised and cannot be used for comparison.

The embalmers inserted resinous padding material into his face (especially the cheeks), arms, hands, legs, and feet to give a fuller, more life-like appearance.

Egyptologist Christine El Mahdy uses the original assumption from Carter's examination that Tutankhamun had a quick burial ceremony since some elements of the mummification appeared rushed, as proof that he needed to be buried quickly following his unexpected death because the man who was next in line for the throne, presumably Ay, wanted to avoid a power struggle that might have occurred if the burial process had taken too long. By speeding up the burial ceremony, the new pharaoh maintained order in Egypt.

== Implications and impact of discovery ==
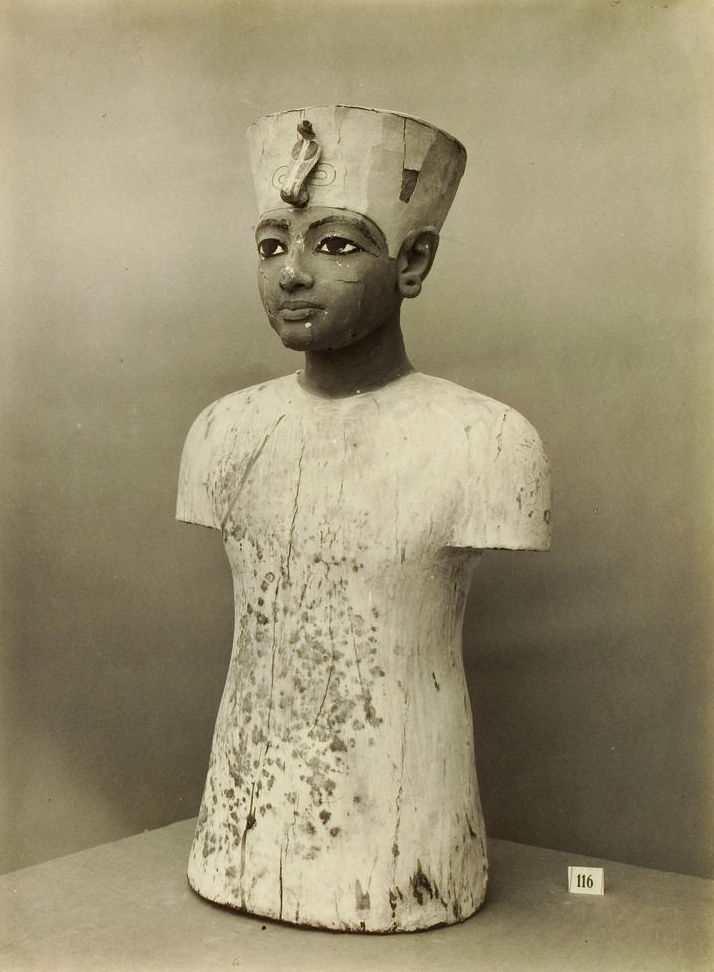
A painted, wooden figure of Tutankhamun found in his royal tomb

Tutankhamun's tomb was the only one in the Valley of the Kings that was not very disturbed by grave robbers, allowing Carter to uncover many artifacts and the untouched mummy. It gave insight into the royal burials, mummification, and tombs of the New Kingdom's 18th Dynasty. Tutankhamun's mummy is the only royal mummy found undisturbed in unwrappable condition.

The royal bloodline that Tutankhamun's family shared ended with the death of the young pharaoh, and with that came a question of the legitimacy of the following rulers. Since its discovery and widespread popularity, it has led to DNA testing done on it and other mummies from the time period that now give a proven family tree for many of the royalty during the 18th Dynasty.

A public interest in archaeology rose after the discovery of the mummy.

The examination of the king's mummy was little-reported in both Arab and Western media at the time. Ikram observes that "the king's body was of less interest to the public than his treasures, or the alleged curse", which continued to be published on into the 1930s, after the clearance of the tomb was completed.

== Current location ==
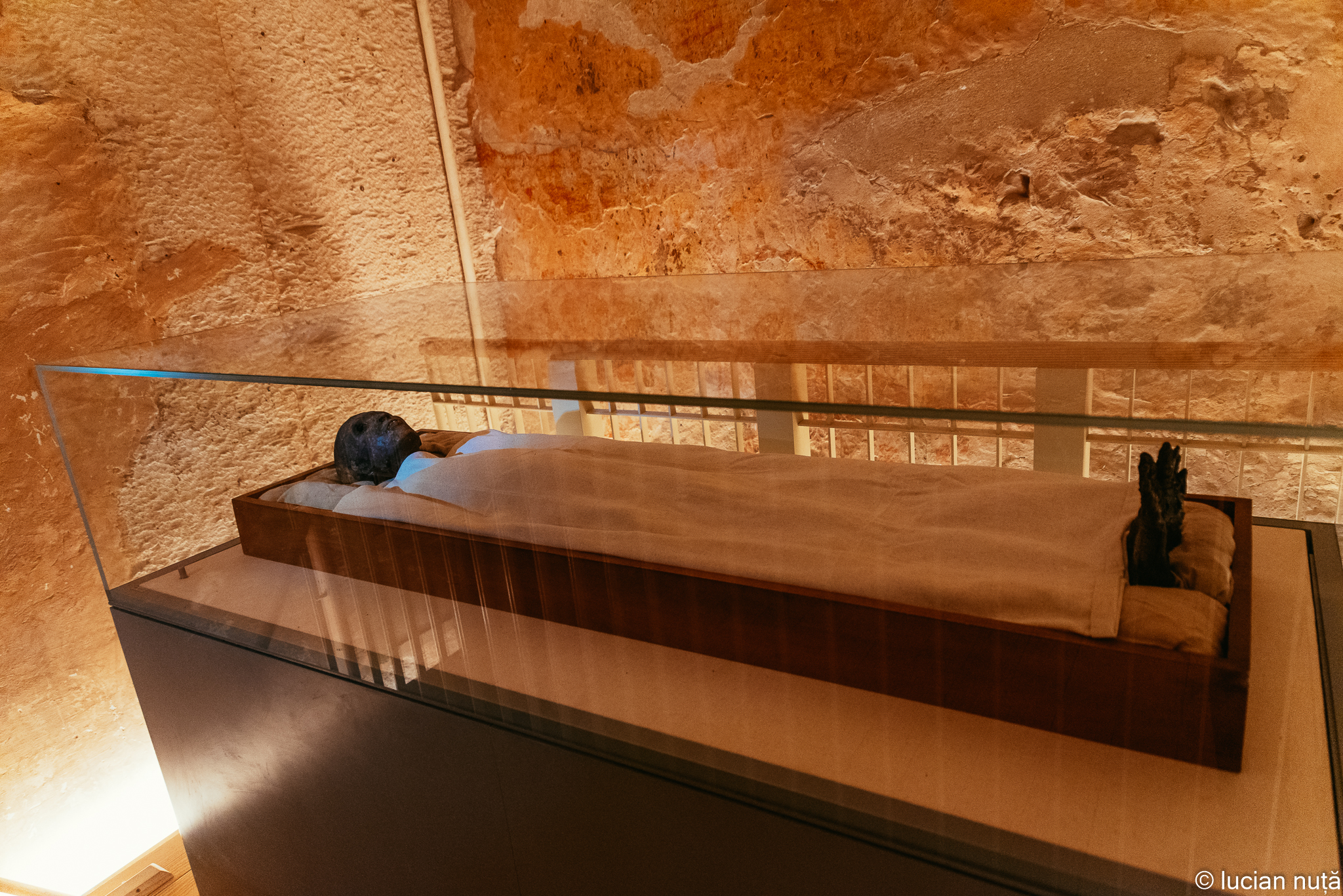
Tutankhamun's mummy displayed in a climate-controlled case within his tomb

In 1926, following the conclusion of the initial examination, Tutankhamun's mummy was placed back into his gilded outermost coffin, which was then put back into the sarcophagus; a sheet of glass was placed over the top, allowing visitors to view the coffin.

On 4 November 2007, 85 years to the day after Carter's discovery, Tutankhamun's mummy was placed on display in his underground tomb at Luxor, when the linen-wrapped mummy was removed from its golden coffin to a climate-controlled glass box. The case was designed to prevent the heightened rate of decomposition caused by the humidity and warmth from tourists visiting the tomb.

In 2025, Ali Abdel-Halim, the director of the Egyptian Museum, confirmed Tutankhamun would remain in the Valley of the Kings, contrary to previous reports from 2022 that there were plans to transfer his body to the Grand Egyptian Museum to be displayed alongside the contents of his tomb.

== See also ==
- List of Egyptian mummies (royalty)
