= Egyptian finger and toe stall =

Ancient Egyptian jewelry

Finger and toe stall
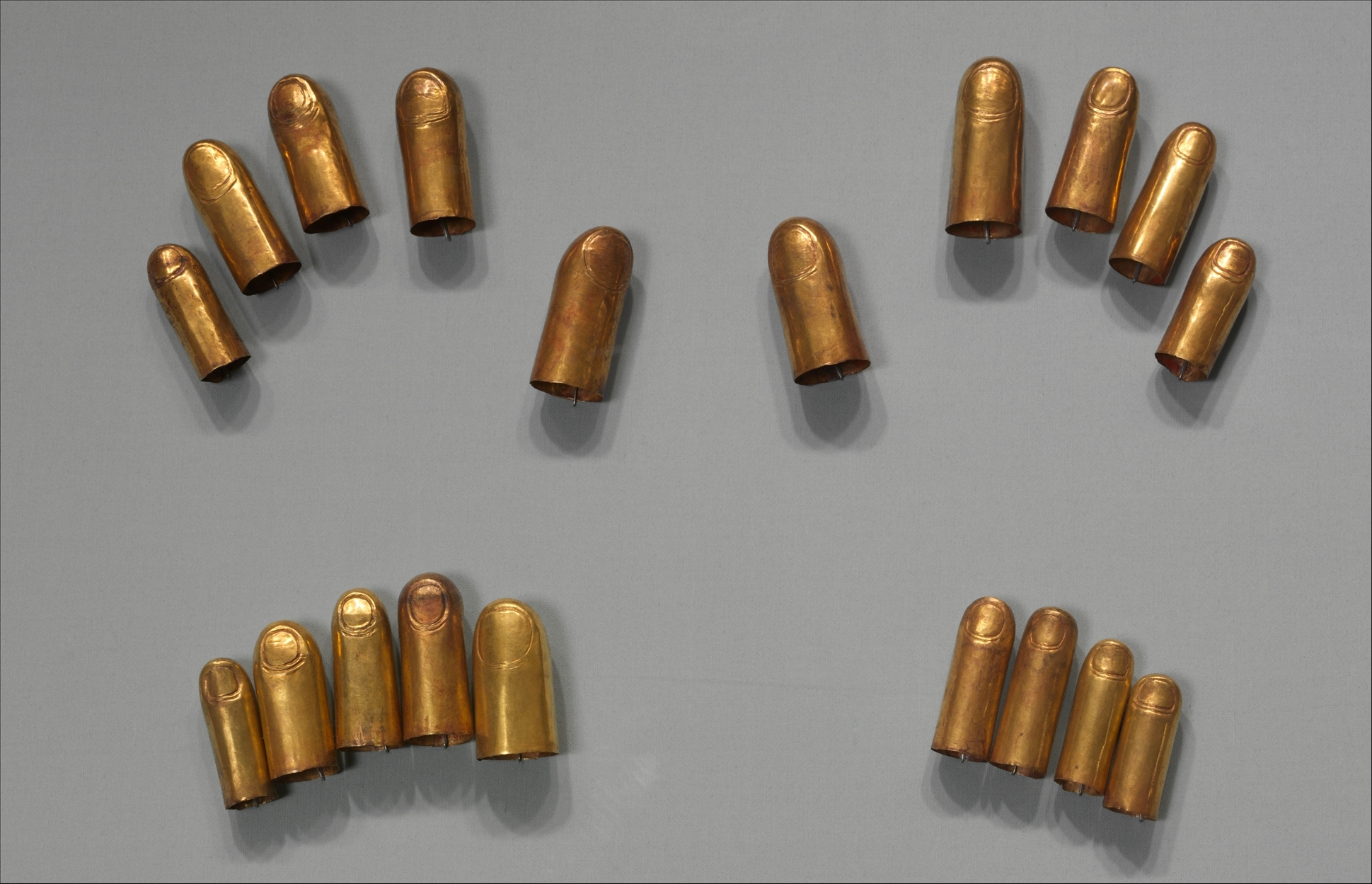
- A set of finger and toe stalls belonging to one of the foreign wives of Thutmose III, dating to the 15th century B.C. Now in the Metropolitan Museum of Art
- Years active: c. 1500–1000 B.C
- Location: Ancient Egypt

Egyptian finger and toe stalls are pieces of gold jewelry used in Ancient Egypt to protect digits during burial. Such stalls were used during the 18th Dynasty of Egypt, as well as other eras, and were thought to protect the deceased from both magical and physical dangers, such as damage which could occur during the mummification process. Additionally, they were sometimes used in order to replace missing digits on the deceased, as it was believed that a complete body was needed for successful passage into the afterlife. This belief mirrors the myth of Osiris, whose body was put back together by his wife Isis, resulting in him becoming the first mummy. Some mummies were buried with prosthetics which they used in life, rather than toe stalls created specifically for burial. These stalls were most commonly found on the remains of royalty. Toe stalls were discovered in the tomb of Tutankhamun, and a nearly complete set of finger and toe stalls was discovered in the tomb of three of the wives of Thutmose III in Thebes. The wives' jewelry is currently on display at the Metropolitan Museum of Art. The stalls from this tomb are some of the earliest known, originating from the early 18th Dynasty. A later surviving example of toe stalls comes from the tomb of Psusennes I, a 21st Dynasty ruler. Although many surviving examples of finger and toe stalls originate from the 18th Dynasty, they were used for much of Ancient Egypt, including into the Ptolemaic and Roman periods. For example, one mummy from this period was found with carved golden finger stalls, similar to those discovered from earlier periods. Though royalty and the upper classes typically had stalls made of gold or silver, less wealthy Egyptians utilized other materials, including wood, stone, and/or mud. In order to provide magical protection for the deceased, a prayer was made to Osiris as the stalls were created. The stalls were often highly detailed, with carved nails and other features, such as rings.

== Gallery ==
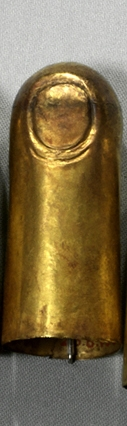
A finger stall

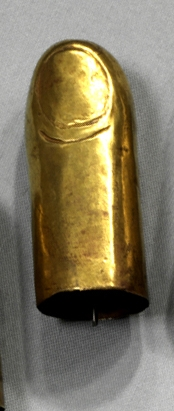
A toe stall

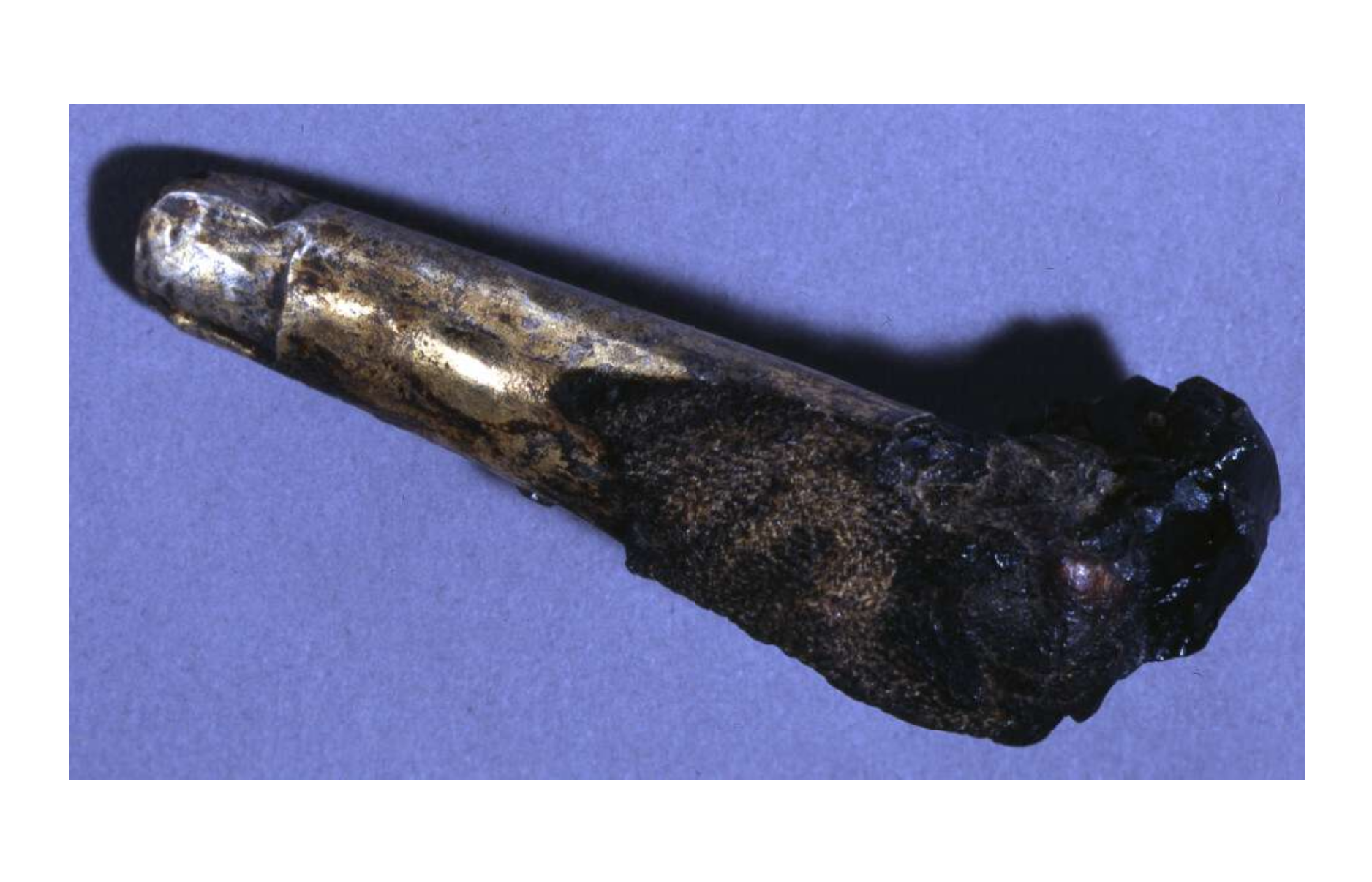
Mummy finger encased in silver stall
