= Village Life in Ancient Egypt =

1999 book by Andrea G. MacDowell

- Author: Andrea G. McDowell
- Publisher: Oxford University Press
- Publication date: December 30, 1999
- Pages: 298
- ISBN: 9780198149989
- OCLC: 1406784437

Village Life in Ancient Egypt: Laundry Lists and Love Songs is a 1999 book by Andrea G. McDowell. It features the translations of 197 texts from the Ancient Egyptian workmen's village of Deir el-Medina, accompanied by original notes by the author.

== Contents ==
Village Life in Ancient Egypt features the translations of 197 texts from the Ancient Egyptian workmen's village of Deir el-Medina, some of which are previously unpublished in addition to existing content, as well as original notes from the author. Encompassing "virtually all aspects" of daily life within the village and mostly dated to the later part of the village's history, these texts come in a diverse range of types, from letters, lists, and records, to materials related to education, literature, medicine, and religion. Amélie Kuhrt said that this diversity contrasts the "idealized image of Egyptian life presented by elite tombs."

The book is divided into six chapters, each containing numerous Deir el-Medina texts and in turn composed of subsections (a system with some overlapping and which MacDowell acknowledges is artificial): "Family and Friends", "Daily Life", "Religion", "Education, Learning, and Literature", "Law", and "Work on the Royal Tomb": The work ends in an epilogue, focused on texts on the final days of Deir el-Medina.

Each text has damage and translation issues noted when present, and small capital letters are used to note red-colored ink. In addition to depictions of ancient Egyptian texts (associated with Deir el-Medina or otherwise), line drawings created by artist Marion Cox or obtained from other primary sources are present.

== Background and reception ==
Village Life in Ancient Egypt was released by Oxford University Press through the Clarendon Press label on December 30, 1999. Barry Kemp noted that Village Life in Ancient Egypt is "a bid to reach a wider audience", in contrast to McDowell's previous work.

Monica M. Bontty stated that Village Life in Ancient Egypt "will be a standard work for years to come and is a valuable addition to books on Deir El Medina and the topic of daily life", calling the book "refreshing" due to historical bias in Egyptology caused by the fragility of daily life objects. Elizabeth Frood said that the text's notes and translations "make the book both attractive and accessible to the general reader and an important resource for teaching and research". Kemp called the book "a good way to make a first acquaintance of a key source population. I wish it had been longer, in respect both of the number of extracts and in the commentaries, but this might have made it seem intimidating to those outside Egyptology, and informed outside comment is what the subject needs." Kuhrt called the book "a vivid guide to some of the most intimate and tricky aspects of Egyptian society".
