= Excerebration =

Mummification procedure of brain removal

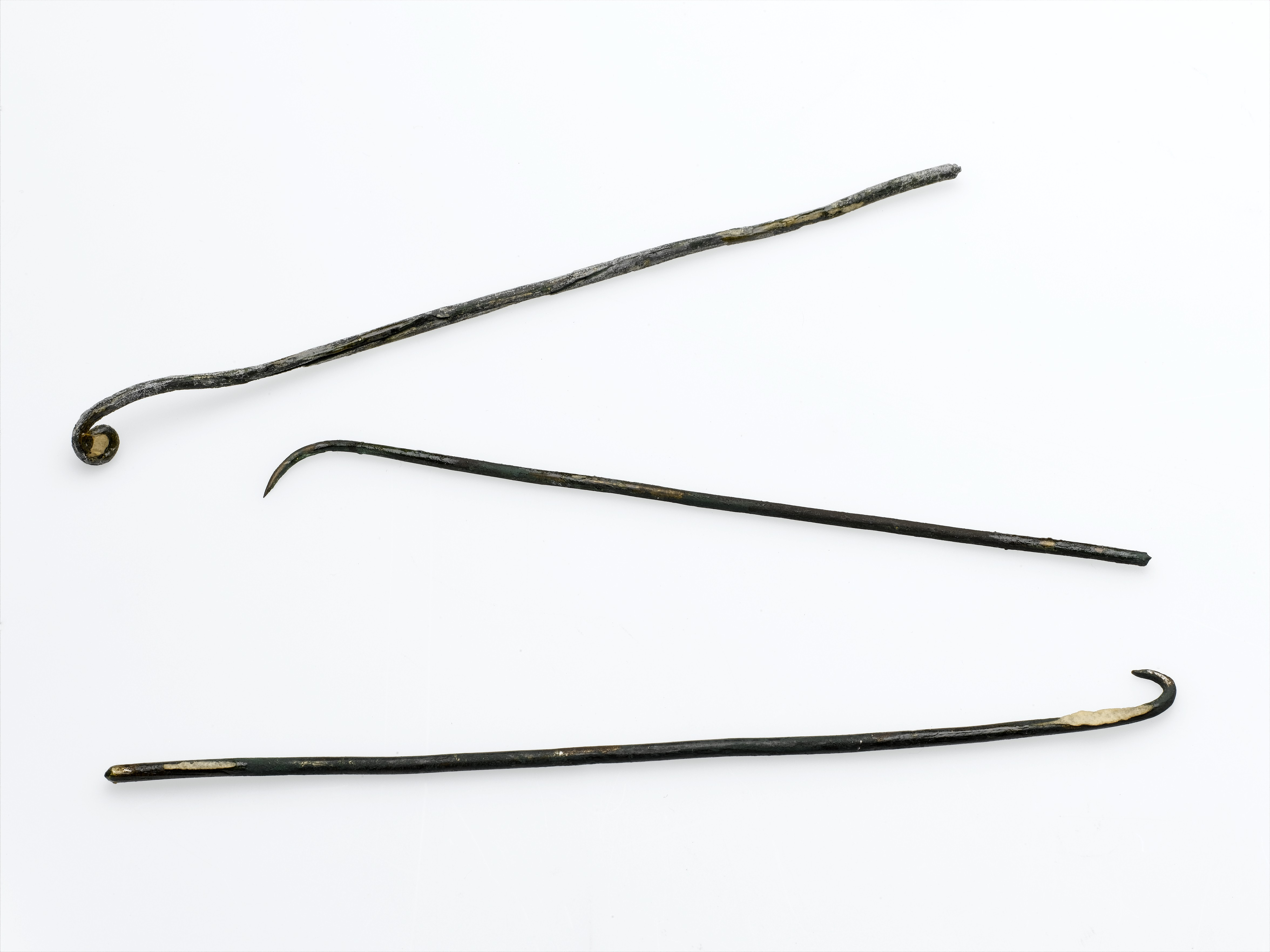
A sampling of some instruments used to remove the brain from a mummified Egyptian corpse.

Excerebration is an ancient Egyptian mummification procedure of removal of the brain from corpses prior to actual embalming. Greek writer Herodotus, a frequent visitor to Egypt, wrote in the fifth century B.C. about the process, "Having agreed on a price, the bearers go away, and the workmen, left alone in their place, embalm the body. If they do this in a perfect way, they first draw out part of the brain through the nostrils with an iron hook, and inject certain drugs into the rest".

An object more than 6.8 inches long, probably made from plants in the group Monocotyledon (including palm and bamboo), would have been used for liquefying and removing the brain. The instrument would be inserted through a hole punched into the ethmoid bone near the nose via a chisel. Some parts of the brain would be wrapped around this stick and pulled out, and the other parts would be liquefied. In order to drain the remaining liquefied brain and cerebral fluid, the individual would be put on their abdomen or their head would be lifted.

== Evolution of Excerebration ==
Excerebration can be traced back to the Old Kingdom through Greco-Roman Egypt. The evidence of excerebration consists primarily of skull perforations. During the Old and Middle Kingdom there was a low frequency of skull perforations, leading some authors to hypothesize an alternative entrance via the foramen magnum. In skulls from the New Kingdom the primary entrance was transnasal.

Over the millennia excerebration has changed. In the Old and Middle Kingdoms a transethmoidal excerebration was the standard. With the assistance of modern technology and CT scanning more evidence has arisen as to where in the skull excerebration occurred. Through CT scans it has been determined that over time the transethmoidal approach was shifted towards a transsphenoidal approach. However, there is also evidence of a combined transethmoidal-transsphenoidal excerebration that could have been used in the Third Intermediate Period.

== Religious Aspects of Excerebration ==
In order to extract all organs from the body embalmers would make an incision on the left side of the abdomen. Similar to this, excerebration was rarely ever seen through the right nostril and almost exclusively through the left nostril. Knowing that the body would have been laid with the head to the north all incisions and excerebration would have taken place on the eastern side of the body. For convenience and accessibility, it would have been more practical to make incisions on the western side of the body or the right side, however, everything was done on the left side, signifying some degree of symbolism or religion was involved. The notion that the right side was honored, while the left was inferior, is a notion common in ancient Egypt. Not only this, but resurrection was also seen as a journey from west to east. Therefore, one could infer that it was more honorable and respectful to the deceased if excerebration and the removal of other organs were performed via cuts made on the left or eastern side of the body.

== See also ==
- Brain biopsy
