= Andrea G. McDowell =

American Egyptologist and legal scholar

- Occupations: Egyptologist; legal scholar
- Awards: Guggenheim Fellowship (2016)

Academic background
- Education: Yale University; University of Pennsylvania; Yale Law School
- Thesis: Jurisdiction in the Workmen's Community of Deir el-Medîna (1987)

Academic work
- Discipline: Egyptology; Legal studies
- Institutions: University of Leiden; Johns Hopkins University; Seton Hall University School of Law

Andrea Griet McDowell is an American academic. She wrote three books in Egyptology, including Village Life in Ancient Egypt (1999). After moving into law, she joined Seton Hall University School of Law as a professor, became a 2016 Guggenheim Fellow, and authored We the Miners (2022).

== Biography ==
McDowell obtained her BA in Ancient Civilizations from Yale University in 1980 and, on fellowships from the Andrew W. Mellon Foundation and Fulbright–Hays Program, her PhD in Ancient History from University of Pennsylvania in 1987. Her doctoral dissertation was titled Jurisdiction in the Workmen's Community of Deir el-Medîna.

McDowell worked as an Egyptology lecturer at the University of Leiden (1986-1989) and a junior research fellow at Somerville College, Oxford (1989-1992), before serving as an Assistant Professor of Egyptian Language and History at Johns Hopkins University. She specialized in Ancient Egyptian law. She published three books in Egyptology: Jurisdiction in the Workmen's Community of Deir el-Medîna (1990), which Barry Kemp said that MacDowell "made her name with"; Hieratic Ostraca in the Hunterian Museum Glasgow (1993); and Village Life in Ancient Egypt (1999).

In 1995, McDowell began her legal career. She obtained her JD from Yale Law School in 1998 and clerked for federal circuit judge Morris S. Arnold. After working at the University of Pennsylvania, University of Wisconsin-Madison, and Yale Law School, she joined Seton Hall University School of Law in 2003 as an associate professor, before eventually becoming promoted to full professor. At Seton Hall, she has taught courses in elder law, estate law, and tort law, as well as legal history, research, and writing. In 2016, she was awarded a Guggenheim Fellowship in Law. In 2022, her book on self-government in the California gold rush, We the Miners, was published by Harvard University Press.

== Bibliography ==
- Jurisdiction in the Workmen's Community of Deir el-Medîna (1990)
- Hieratic Ostraca in the Hunterian Museum Glasgow (1993)
- Village Life in Ancient Egypt (1999)
- We the Miners (2022) (Note: Reviews of this book:)
