= Workmen's Village, Amarna =

Ancient Egyptian village at Amarna

Workmen's Village
- Location within Egypt
- 27.6333°N 30.9167°E
- Periods: Eighteenth Dynasty of Egypt
- Location: Amarna, Minya Governorate, Egypt
- Region: Upper Egypt
- Part of: Amarna

History
- Built: Approximately 1346 BC
- Built by: Akhenaten

The Workmen's Village, located in the desert 1.2 kilometres (0.75 mi) east of the ancient city of Akhetaten (modern Amarna), was built during the reign of the Eighteenth Dynasty pharaoh Akhenaten. It housed the workers who constructed and decorated the tombs of the city's elite, making it comparable to the better studied Theban workers village of Deir el-Medina. Though an isolated part of Amarna, the Workmen's Village provides many well preserved artifacts and buildings allowing archaeologists to gather much information about how society functioned.

== Excavation history ==
The Workmen's Village has been known to archeology since the surveys of British Egyptologist Flinders Petrie in the 1890s. Workmen village was first excavated in 1921 by the Egypt Exploration Society. At this time it was known as the Eastern Village. Two seasons of excavation were undertaken by T. Eric Peet and Leonard Woolley; the first season excavated four houses as a test of the site and the second season excavated approximately half of the village. Some of the tomb chapels that surround the village were also excavated. The Egypt Exploration Society resumed excavations in 1979 led by Barry Kemp and concluded in 1986. These excavations focused on the areas immediately surrounding the walled village.

== Walled village ==
The village is located on the floor of a Y-shaped valley. The South Tombs, which are within easy walking distance, are the only part of the city directly visible from this isolated location. The walled village is where the settlement takes its name occupies an area of approximately 70 square meters and is surrounded by an outer wall 75–80 centimetres (30–31 in) thick. It has a single entrance on the southern side and is divided into two unequal halves by an equally thick inner wall; this inner wall is the old outer wall as the western portion of the village is an expansion. Seventy-two houses of identical size are found inside this area, with one larger house with its own garden that presumably belonged to an official overseer; another larger house was found in the western section. Each house was 5 metres (16 ft) wide and 10 metres (33 ft) long, and constructed of mudbrick with some stone used around the base of the walls. Thresholds were often made of cut stone but no stone walls were found. The interior was divided into four main rooms: the "entrance hall", "living room", "bedroom", and "kitchen". Stairs, located either in front or rear of the house, led up to a second floor. In some houses the walls had been preserved to a height of 1.8 metres (5.9 ft). Windows are not preserved but were likely small and high up to let in light but minimize dust. The interiors were once decorated but little survives. Panels of colour were found to begin about 20 centimetres (7.9 in) from the floor in some houses. The best preserved decoration depicts dancing figures of Bes along with the goddess Taweret, and in a separate house a scene of women and girls who may be musicians or dancers. Finds from within the houses are consistent with everyday life: amulets, beads, fragments of matting, spindle whorls, rings, headrests, and pottery.

The earliest example of human fleas comes from the Workmen's Village. High frequencies of both fleas and bed bugs were encountered implying that ectoparasite levels were high in the population, with the cramped conditions of the village serving as a possible breeding ground for disease.

The village contains no well, so water along with food stuffs and animal fodder must have been brought in from the city. The likely distribution point is close to a building on the edge of town that probably served as a checkpoint. There is evidence that animals were kept both inside and immediately outside the village. This evidence comes in the form of animal pens in the south-western part of the village and mangers in the main street, as well as buildings directly in front of the village and to the east. The remains of cow, pig, and goat were found in the rubbish dumps. The limited range of cattle bones recovered indicates that joints of beef were likely part of the rations and that they were not being raised on-site. Pigs, fed grain, were raised in covered pens, and goats, fed vegetable material, were raised in separate areas surrounding the village. The inhabitants also made attempts to garden in the areas below and between the chapels outside the village. The fact the villagers were going to such efforts to try to be partially self-sufficient indicates that the state had a limited role in providing for the needs of the people. It can be postulated that the villagers used the animals they raised to pay for the extra water and grain needed for the animals.

=== Residents ===
The village resembles the Theban Deir el-Medina, and at least one individual bore the same title as the Deir el-Medina workers - "Servant of the Place [of Truth]." It is possible that the residents of the Amarna village were in fact the Deir el-Medina community transplanted to the new capital. This theory is based on the conspicuous absence of Amarna Period royal name faience rings from Deir el-Medina; it appears that the village was uninhabited in this period.

== Chapels and their wall paintings ==
Outside of the walled portion of the village approximately twenty-three chapels were built along the hillside. These chapels are generally composed of mudbrick and limestone for their construction and varied considerably in their layout. The essential features found in the more complex examples were an outer court, an inner court, as well as a shrine with niches. Comparison with the chapels at Deir el Medina, it clarifies the purpose of the chapels in this village. They were not built as funerary chapels initially, but as places where divinities or family members could be worshiped, and as places where special meals could be prepared and eaten.

=== Main Chapel ===
The Main Chapel, is located to the southeast of the walled village, it is the largest and best understood, having been protected from robbers by piles of spoil from the excavations in the 1920s. It was built in the last stage of the occupation of the village, during the reign of Tutankhamun given it partly overlies earlier construction in the stratigraphy. The structure had two entrances: a formal one to the east and another one further to the south which was probably for everyday use. The formal entrance seems to have had a pylon structure, while the southern entrance was approached by a line of T-shaped basins set into the ground. The chapel had several annexes for cooking and for housing animals.

This chapel is most well known for its colorful paintings which survive as fragments. The majority of the paintings had a yellow background, although some also occurred on a white ground. Decoration from the Sanctuary included two vultures grasping shen rings and feather fans, and a winged sun disc, and bouquets, all most likely from the east wall, above the shrine doorways. At least one vulture had a vertical chequered border. No direct evidence was present for what design occurred above the vultures but evidence of a blue band of lotus petals topped by a chequer pattern is present in association with the sun disc; it is likely this decorative scheme occurred above the vultures as well. The remains of striped cavetto cornices were also found. Long-stemmed lotus flowers were also found and again perhaps originated from the east wall, or perhaps from the small pylons to the west. Friezes of looped open lotuses and buds also occurred but it is uncertain if these connected to the other lotus petal frieze. The paint was applied to plaster made of alluvial mud mixed with chopped straw.

The decoration of the Inner Hall featured chequered and looped lotus friezes, semi-circular garlands, male and female figures, and hieroglyphs. Paintings from the north wall are the best preserved. The faces are painted in the conventional Theban style and do not show any of the distortions associated with the Amarna Period art style. However, this is not unique to the Main Chapel, as conventional offering scenes are found in the innermost parts of the tomb of Huya, Panehesy, and Any. The woman wears a long wig with a fillet of lotus petals and cornflowers and topped by an incense cone while the man wears a short Nubian-style wig likewise topped with a perfume cone; both hold bouquets. They were likely seated before an offering table, of which no trace survives. Fragments of smaller-scale figures indicate there were other standing figures, likely a chantress and another woman. The south wall was less well preserved but likely featured a complementary scene painted on a yellow ground; these figures are presumed to have been depicted standing.

Few decorated fragments survived from the Outer Hall but its design appears to have featured garlands, friezes, and figures. Designs of grape trellises and bouquets feature in the Side Chapel, along with a scene of flying ducks.

The Main Chapel was likely built to commemorate a man named Sennefer, whose name appears over the head of a male figure; based on the fragmentary hieroglyphic inscription, he may have been a scribe.

=== Purpose ===
The purpose of the chapel was, as with other New Kingdom chapels, to “experience a sense of communion with spirits”. Weatherhead and Kemp elaborate as follows:

The Workmen's Village chapels... show that people really did prepare and eat meals in spiritually charged locations... At the Amarna Workmen's Village (and at Deir el-Medina) the local combination of a small and prescribed house size and abundant external space allowed people to think more expansively and to build separate places - the chapels - which satisfied both the desire to express spirituality and the convenient accommodation of the feasting element of honouring the spiritual essence of family headship, that included ancestors... By this view, the Workmen's Village chapels are the product of contingency: the isolation of the village and its cramped interior, the unusual closeness of its cemetery, and the existence of much open space brought out within the villagers a fuller architectural expression of spiritual communion, combining meals with commemoration, than was open to people of similar or even higher social standing within the city proper.

== Cemetery ==
Excavation by Peet and Woolley on the slopes above the chapels uncovered nine tomb shafts, of which four had never been completed. Two appear to have contained burials as fragments of a coffin, pottery, and the later interment of a child were encountered in one, and animal remains and pottery in the other. The rock is of such poor quality that sinking a tomb shaft and erecting a chapel over top of it proved impossible; the shafts were sunk at some distance from the chapels, on a ridge. Given that the chapels and tombs can be separated by up to 400 metres (0.25 miles), it is difficult to associate a shaft with a particular chapel.

== Significance ==
In general, the site of Akhetaten dedicates the vast majority of wall painting to not only displaying the royal family alongside the Aten but also to showcasing the daily lives of the citizens as being prosperous, joyful, and lively. The Workmen's Village has suffered less disturbance than the main city, and its greater preservation provides a better chance at understanding everyday life during the Amarna Period.

The remote desert location of the Workmen's Village affords better preservation of materials such as textiles and wood, as destructive insect activity is lower. This gives perhaps a truer picture of the range of materials used for certain artifact classes, such as spindle whorls. In the main city, stone is the most common, presumably because insect activity has destroyed wooden examples that, based on finds from the Workmen's Village, would have been the most common type. Thousands of fragments of linen were excavated. Most are undyed but some preserve colours such as red, blue, purple, pink. Parts of clothing, such as entire sleeves were also preserved, allowing the identification of clothing items such as short sleeved tunics and loincloths. Small amounts of piled linen textile, probably from blankets, and some woolen fabric are also preserved at the village. Additionally, twisted linen wicks smeared with incense were found, giving a window into the scents present in homes. A particularly rare find from the village was of a whole bed with woven grass base still intact, upturned, in the street outside a house. As beds are a rare find, it is unknown how common they were in the wider society.

=== Religious significance ===
During Akhenaten's reign, the god Aten was worshipped above all others. The worship of other gods was suppressed and their temples closed; Amun received the harshest treatment, with his name eventually being hacked out where it occurred. Akhenaten's devotion to the Aten culminated with his reforms of Egyptian religion in the cult of the royal family who are the sole intermediaries between the populace and the Aten and the founding of the city of Akhetaten. It appears that the general population continued their traditional worship of household gods like Bes and Taweret, with amulets of both and a stele of Taweret being found in the city itself. To this end it is interesting to note that the name of Amun appears in painted fragments from the Main Chapel and Chapel 529. The fragments from the Main Chapel are in the "Htp-di-nswt" format and call Amun the "good ruler eternally, lord of heaven, who made the whole earth." Additionally, a wooden top for a military standard depicting Wepwawet was found in the sanctuary.

Reconstructed Chapel 525 Workmen's Village.

In Chapel 525 two stelae were found. The smaller of the two depicts the god Shed, who is called "the great god, the Lord of the Two Lands", while the larger one addresses funerary prayers to Shed and the goddess Isis in addition to the Aten. This larger stele is inscribed for a man named Ptah-may, who is the "praised one of the Living Aten", and his family. Peet and Woolley suggested that the worship of the traditional gods continued throughout the reign of Akhenaten, and that the distance separating the Workmen's Village from the main city afforded it more freedom in this regard. They also interpret the presence of the name of Amun as an indication that the decoration dates to the early reign of Tutankhamun, when orthodoxy was returning. More recently, Weatherhead and Kemp suggested that the use of the traditional art style instead of the court style in the decoration of the chapels indicates a separation between public life, with its displays of loyalty to the king, and private life, where expressions of grief and commemoration remained largely unchanged and traditional. This is taken to indicate that the Aten cult and iconography had limited penetration into the lives of the general populace.
