= Ancient Egyptian funerary practices =

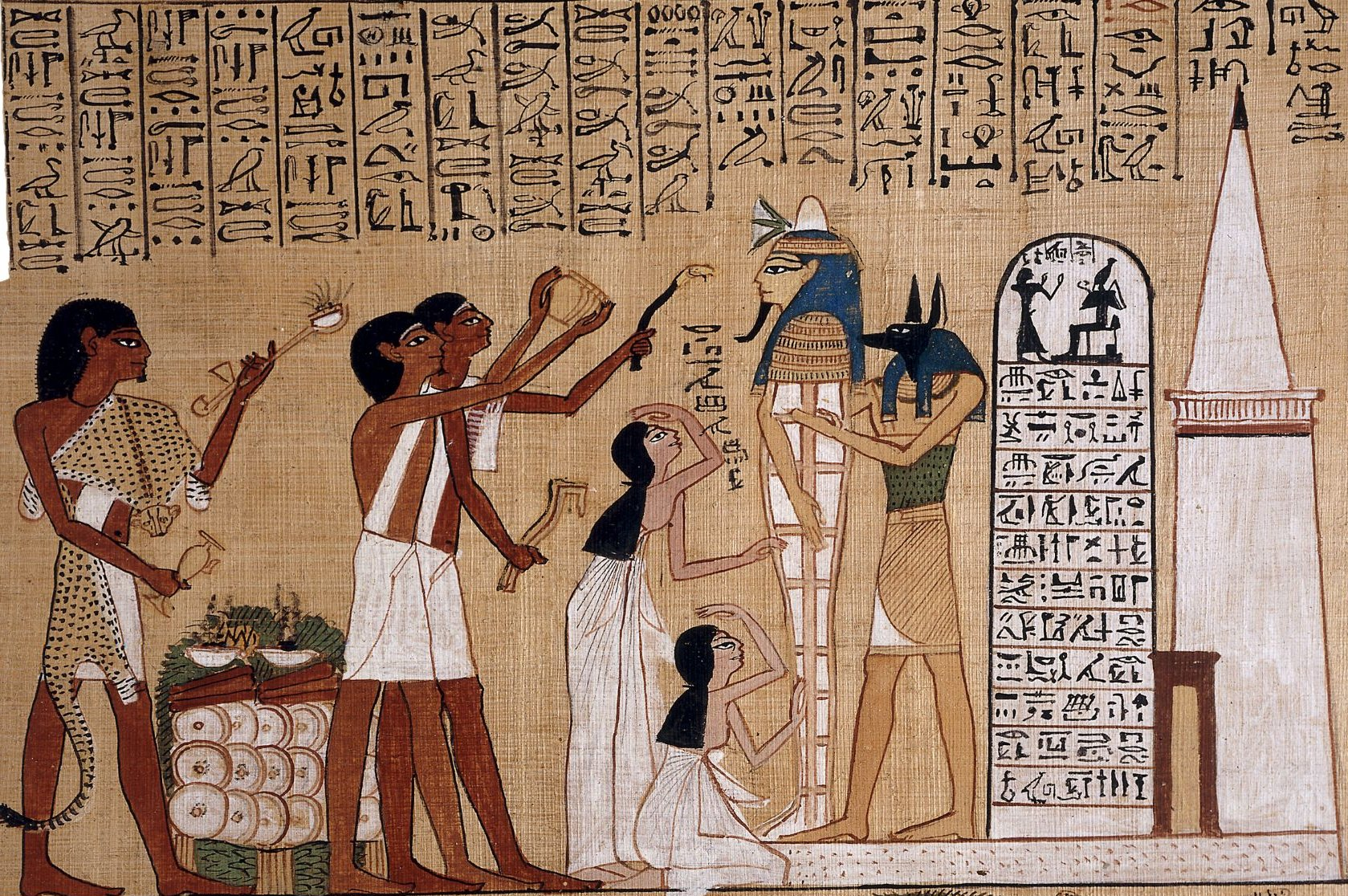
The Opening of the Mouth ceremony being performed on a mummy before the tomb. Extract from the Papyrus of Hunefer, a 19th-Dynasty Book of the Dead (c.1300 BCE)

The ancient Egyptians had an elaborate set of funerary practices that they believed were necessary to ensure their immortality after death. These rituals included mummifying the body, casting magic spells, and burials with specific grave goods thought to be needed in the afterlife.

The ancient burial process evolved over time as old customs were discarded and new ones adopted, but several important elements of the process persisted. Although specific details changed over time, the preparation of the body, the magic rituals, and grave goods were all essential parts of a proper Egyptian funeral.

== History ==
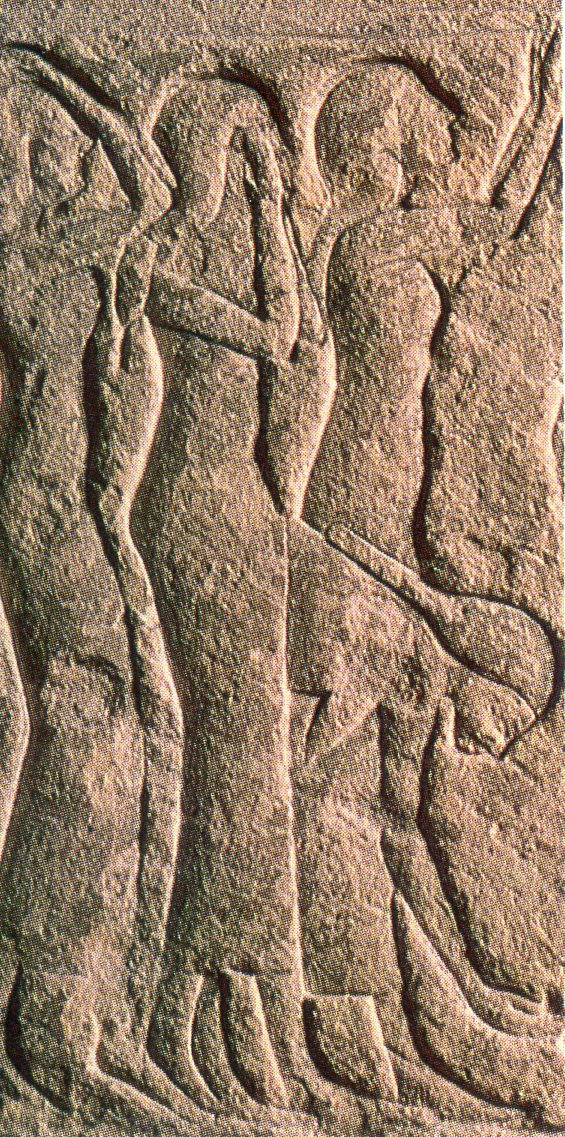
Depiction of professional mourners

Although no writing survived from the Predynastic period in Egypt (c. 6000–3150 BCE), scholars believe the importance of the physical body and its preservation originated during that time. This likely explains why people of that time did not follow the common practice of cremation among neighboring cultures, but rather buried the dead. Some of the scholars believe the Predynastic-era Egyptians may have feared the bodies would rise again if mistreated after death.

Early burials were in simple, shallow oval pits, with a few burial goods. Sometimes multiple people and animals were placed in the same grave. Over time, graves became a little more complex. At one point, bodies were placed in a wicker basket and later on wooden or terracotta coffins became the preferred choice. The latest tombs Egyptians made were sarcophagi. These graves contained burial goods such as jewellery, food, games, and sharpened flint.

From the Predynastic period through the final Ptolemaic dynasty, there was a constant cultural focus on eternal life and the certainty of personal existence beyond death. This belief in an afterlife is reflected in the burial of grave goods in tombs. The Egyptian beliefs in an afterlife became known throughout the ancient world by way of trade and cultural transmission and had an influence on other civilizations and religions. Notably, this belief became well known by way of the Silk Road. Egyptians believed that individuals were admitted into the afterlife on the basis of being able to serve a purpose there. For example, the king was thought to be allowed into the afterlife because of the role as a ruler of Ancient Egypt, which would be a purpose translated into qualification for admission to the afterlife.

Human sacrifices found in early royal tombs reinforce the idea of serving a purpose in the afterlife. Those sacrificed were probably meant to serve the king in the afterlife. Eventually, figurines and wall paintings begin to replace human victims. Some of these figurines may have been created to resemble certain people, so they could follow the king after their own lives ended.

Not only did the lower classes rely on the king's favor, but also the noble classes. They believed that upon death, kings became deities who could bestow upon certain individuals the ability to have an afterlife. This belief existed from the predynastic period through the Old Kingdom.

Although many spells from the earlier texts were carried over, the new Coffin Texts also had new spells added, along with slight changes made to make the new funerary text more relatable to the nobility. In the First Intermediate period, however, the importance of the king declined. Funerary texts, previously restricted to royal use, became more widely available. The kings no longer were god-kings in the sense that admission to the next life was allowed in the next life only due to the royal status, the role of kings changed, becoming merely the rulers of the population who upon death, would be leveled down toward the plane of the mortals.

=== Prehistory, earliest burials ===
Some of the earliest burial sites in ancient Egypt are of the Merimde culture, which dates to 4800-4300 B.C. Located in the Nile delta, they are known for producing clay figurines, but did not bury their dead with grave goods or offerings. The first evidence of funerals in Egypt with grave goods are known from the villages of Omari and Maadi in the north, near present-day Cairo. The people of these villages buried their dead in a simple, round grave with a pot. The body was neither treated nor arranged in a particular way as these aspects would change later in the historical period. Without any written evidence, except for the regular inclusion of a single pot in the grave, there is little to provide information about contemporary beliefs concerning the afterlife during that period. Given later customs, the pot was probably intended to hold food for the deceased.

=== Predynastic period, development of customs ===
Funerary customs were developed during the Predynastic period from those of the Prehistoric period. At first, people excavated round graves with one pot in the Badarian period (4400–3800 BCE), continuing the tradition of Omari and Maadi cultures. By the end of the Predynastic period, there were increasing numbers of objects deposited with the body in rectangular graves, and there is growing evidence of rituals practiced by Egyptians of the Naqada II period (3650–3300 BCE). At this point, bodies were regularly arranged in a crouched, compact position, with the face pointing toward either the east and the rising sun or the west that in this historical period was the land of the dead. Artists painted jars with funeral processions and perhaps images of ritual dancing. Figures of bare-breasted women with birdlike faces and their legs concealed under skirts also appeared. Some graves were much richer in goods than others, demonstrating the beginnings of social stratification. Gender differences in burials emerged with the inclusion of weapons in men's graves and cosmetic palettes in women's graves.

By 3600 BCE, Egyptians had begun to mummify the dead, wrapping them in linen bandages with embalming oils (conifer resin and aromatic plant extracts).

=== Early Dynastic period, tombs and coffins ===
By the First Dynasty, some Egyptians were wealthy enough to build tombs over their burials rather than placing their bodies in simple pit graves dug into the sand. The rectangular, mudbrick tomb with an underground burial chamber, termed a mastaba in modern archaeology, developed in the Early Dynastic period. These tombs had niched walls, a style of building called the palace-façade motif because the walls imitated those surrounding the palace of the king. Since commoners as well as kings, however, had such tombs, the architecture suggests that in death, some wealthy people did achieve an elevated status. Later in the historical period, it is certain that the deceased was associated with the god of the dead, Osiris.

Grave goods expanded to include furniture, jewelry, and games as well as the weapons, cosmetic palettes, and food supplies in decorated jars known earlier, in the Predynastic period. In the richest tombs, grave goods then numbered in the thousands. Only the newly invented coffins for the body were made specifically for the tomb. Some inconclusive evidence exists for mummification. Other objects in the tombs that had been used during daily life suggest that in the First Dynasty Egyptians already anticipated needing such objects in the next life. Further continuity from this life into the next can be found in the positioning of tombs: those persons who served the king during their lifetimes chose burials close to their king. The use of stela in front of the tomb began in the First Dynasty, indicating a desire to individualize the tomb with the deceased's name.

=== Old Kingdom, pyramids and mummification ===
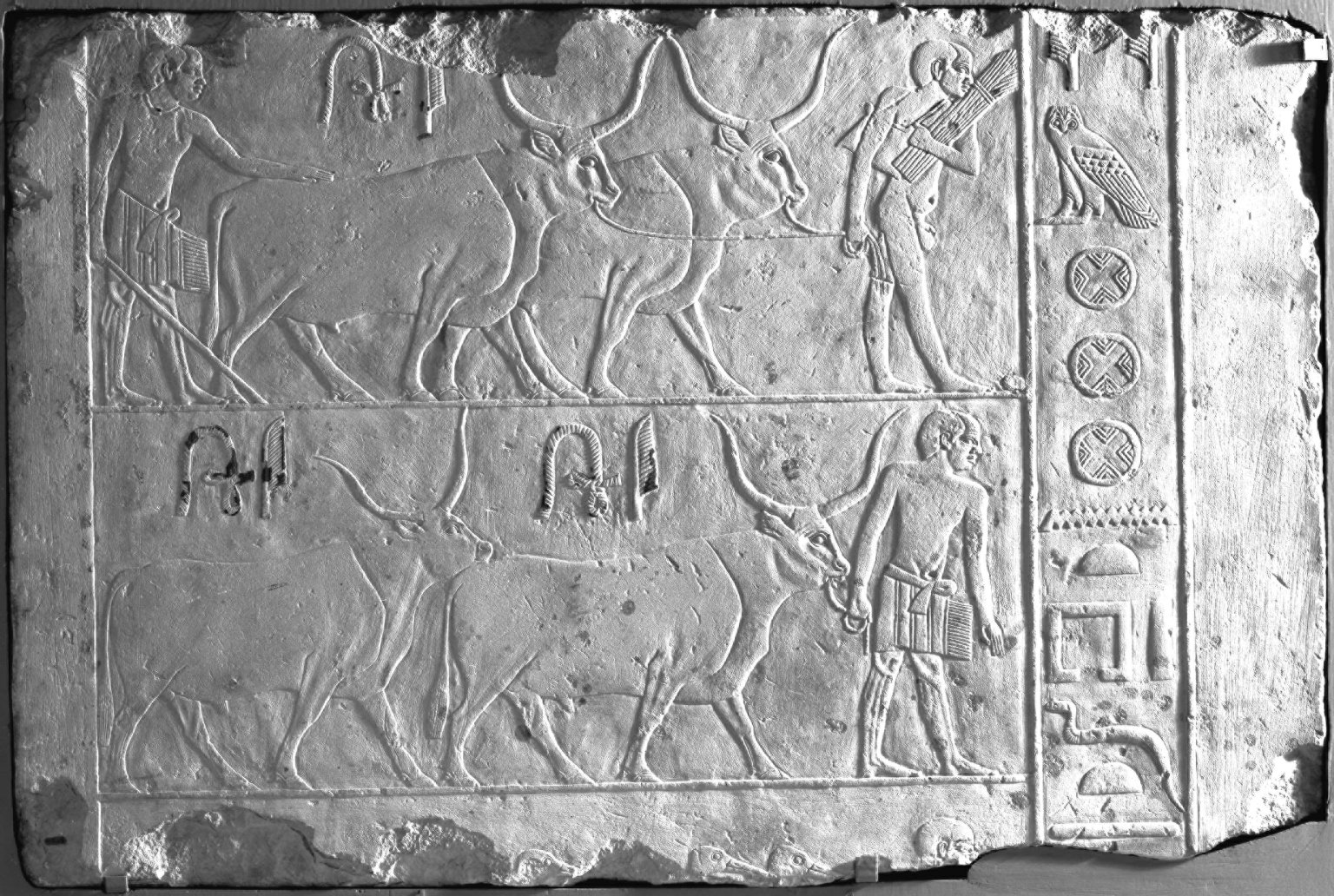
Relief of Men Presenting Oxen, c. 2500–2350 BCE Limestone. In this relief, three men bring cattle to the tomb owner, "from the towns of the estate", as the inscription says. Two of these balding, rustic laborers wear kilts of coarse material and the other wears nothing at all. A fragmentary scene below shows men bringing cranes, which Egyptians penned and raised for food. Artisans carved images of live food animals in tombs to supply the deceased with an eternal source of provisions. Brooklyn Museum

In the Old Kingdom, kings first built pyramids for their tombs surrounded by stone mastaba tombs for their high officials. The fact that most high officials were also royal relatives suggests another motivation for such placement: these complexes were also family cemeteries.

Among the elite, bodies were mummified, wrapped in linen bandages, sometimes covered with molded plaster, and placed in stone sarcophagi or plain wooden coffins. At the end of the Old Kingdom, mummy masks in cartonnage (linen soaked in plaster, modeled, and painted) also appeared. Canopic jars became used to hold their internal organs. Amulets of gold, faience, and carnelian first appeared in various shapes to protect different parts of the body. There is also the first evidence of inscriptions inside the coffins of the elite during the Old Kingdom. Often, reliefs of everyday items were etched onto the walls to supplement grave goods, which made them available through their representation.

The new false door was a non-functioning stone sculpture of a door, found either inside the chapel or on the outside of the mastaba; it served as a place to make offerings and recite prayers for the deceased. Statues of the deceased were being included in tombs and used for ritual purposes. Burial chambers of some private people received their first decorations in addition to the decoration of the chapels. At the end of the Old Kingdom, the burial chamber decorations depicted offerings, but not people.

=== First Intermediate period, regional variation ===
The political situation in the First Intermediate period, with its many centers of power, is reflected in the many local styles of art and burial at that time. The many regional styles for decorating coffins make their origins easy to distinguish from each other. For example, some coffins have one-line inscriptions and many styles include the depiction of Wadjet eyes (the human eye with the markings of a falcon). There are also regional variations in the hieroglyphs used to decorate coffins.

Occasionally men had tools and weapons placed in their graves, while some women had jewelry and cosmetic objects, such as mirrors. Grindstones were sometimes included in women's tombs, perhaps to be considered a tool for food preparation in the next world, just as the weapons in men's tombs imply men's assignment to a role in fighting.

=== Middle Kingdom, new tomb contents ===
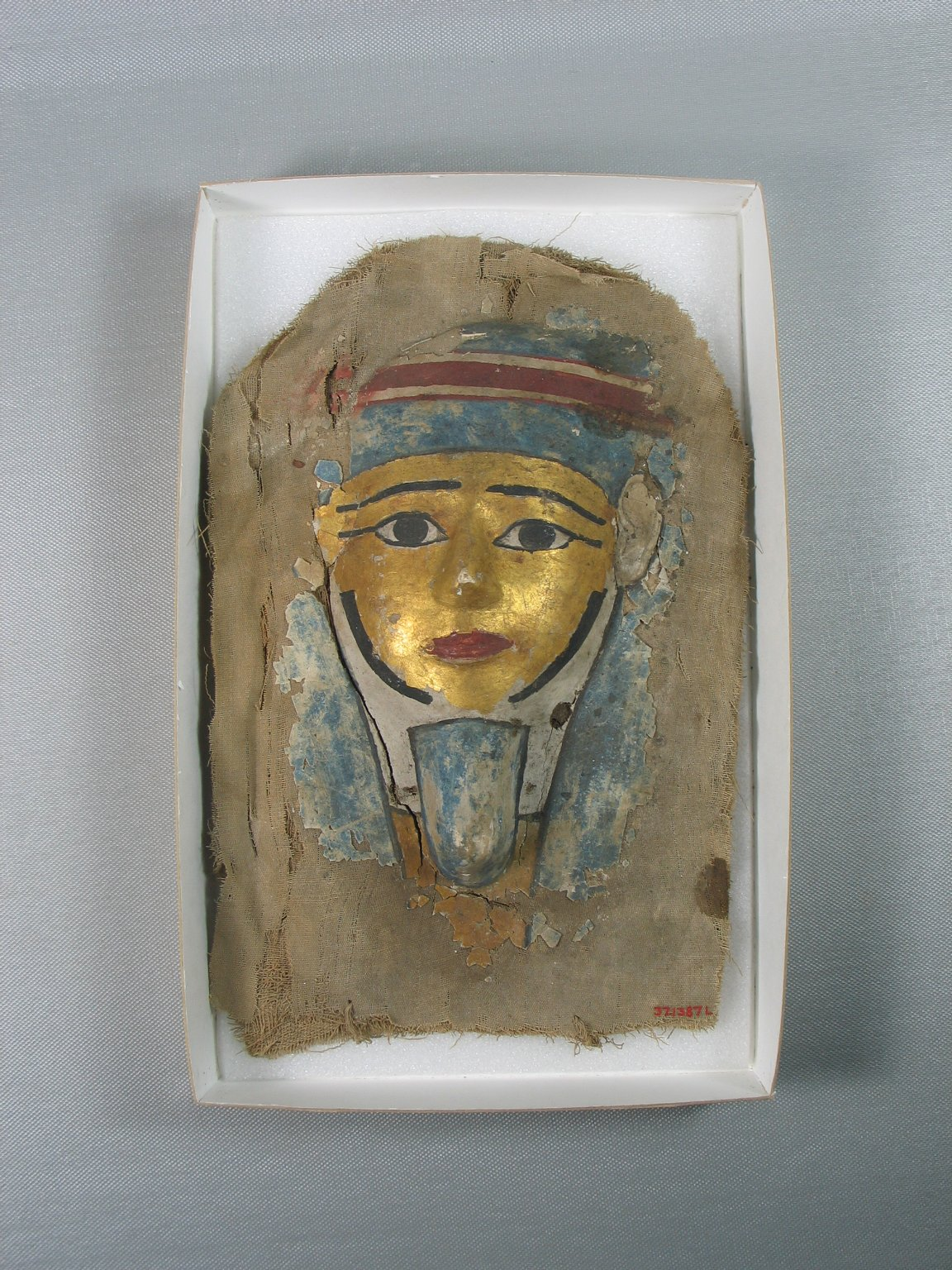
Mask from a coffin. Middle Kingdom (12th or 13th Dynasty, c. 19th century BCE). Cartonnage, 37.1387E, Brooklyn Museum

Burial customs in the Middle Kingdom reflect some of the political trends of that period. During the Eleventh Dynasty, tombs were cut into the mountains of Thebes surrounding the king's tomb or, in local cemeteries in Upper and Middle Egypt; Thebes was the native city of the Eleventh Dynasty kings, and they preferred to be buried there. But the Twelfth Dynasty high officials served the kings of a new family now ruling from the north in Lisht; these kings and their high officials preferred burial in a mastaba near the pyramids belonging to their masters. Moreover, the difference in topography between Thebes and Lisht led to a difference in tomb type: In the north, nobles built mastaba tombs on the flat desert plains, while in the south, local dignitaries continued to excavate tombs into the mountain.

For those of ranks lower than royal courtiers during the Eleventh Dynasty, tombs were simpler. Coffins could be simple wooden boxes with the body either mummified and wrapped in linen or simply wrapped without mummification, and the addition of a cartonnage mummy mask, a custom that continued until the Graeco-Roman period. Some tombs included wooded shoes and a simple statue near the body. In one burial there were only twelve loaves of bread, a leg of beef, and a jar of beer for food offerings. Jewelry could be included but only rarely were objects of great value found in non-elite graves. Some burials continued to include the wooden models that were popular during the First Intermediate period. Wooden models of boats, scenes of food production, craftsmen and workshops, and professions such as scribes or soldiers have been found in the tombs of this period.

Some rectangular coffins of the Twelfth Dynasty have short inscriptions and representations of the most important offerings the deceased required. For men, the objects depicted were weapons and symbols of office as well as food. Women's coffins depicted mirrors, sandals, and jars containing food and drink. Some coffins included texts that were later versions of the royal Pyramid Texts.

Another kind of faience model of the deceased as a mummy seems to anticipate the use of shabti figurines (also called shawabti or an ushabti) later in the Twelfth Dynasty. These early figurines do not have the text directing the figure to work in the place of the deceased that is found in later figurines. The richest people had stone figurines that seem to anticipate shabtis, though some scholars have seen them as mummy substitutes rather than servant figures.

In the later Twelfth Dynasty, significant changes occurred in burials, perhaps reflecting administrative changes enacted by King Senwosret III (1836–1818 BCE). The body was now regularly placed on its back, rather than its side as had been traditional for thousands of years. Coffin texts and wooden models disappeared from new tombs of the period while heart scarabs and figurines shaped as mummies were now often included in burials, as they would be for the remainder of Egyptian history. Coffin decoration was simplified. The Thirteenth Dynasty saw another change in decoration. Different motifs were found in the north and south, a reflection of decentralized government power at the time. There was also a marked increase in the number of burials in one tomb, a rare occurrence in earlier periods. The reuse of one tomb by a family over generations seems to have occurred when wealth was more equitably spread.

=== Second Intermediate period, foreigner burials ===
Known graves from the Second Intermediate period reveal the presence of non-Egyptians buried in the country. In the north, graves associated with the Hyksos, a western Semitic people ruling the north from the northeast delta, include small mudbrick structures containing the body, pottery vessels, a dagger in a men's graves, and often a nearby donkey burial. Simple pan-shaped graves in various parts of the country are thought to belong to Nubian soldiers. Such graves reflect very ancient customs and feature shallow, round pits, bodies contracted, and minimal food offerings in pots. The occasional inclusion of identifiable Egyptian materials from the Second Intermediate period provides the only marks distinguishing these burials from those of Predynastic and even earlier periods.

=== New Kingdom, new object purposes ===
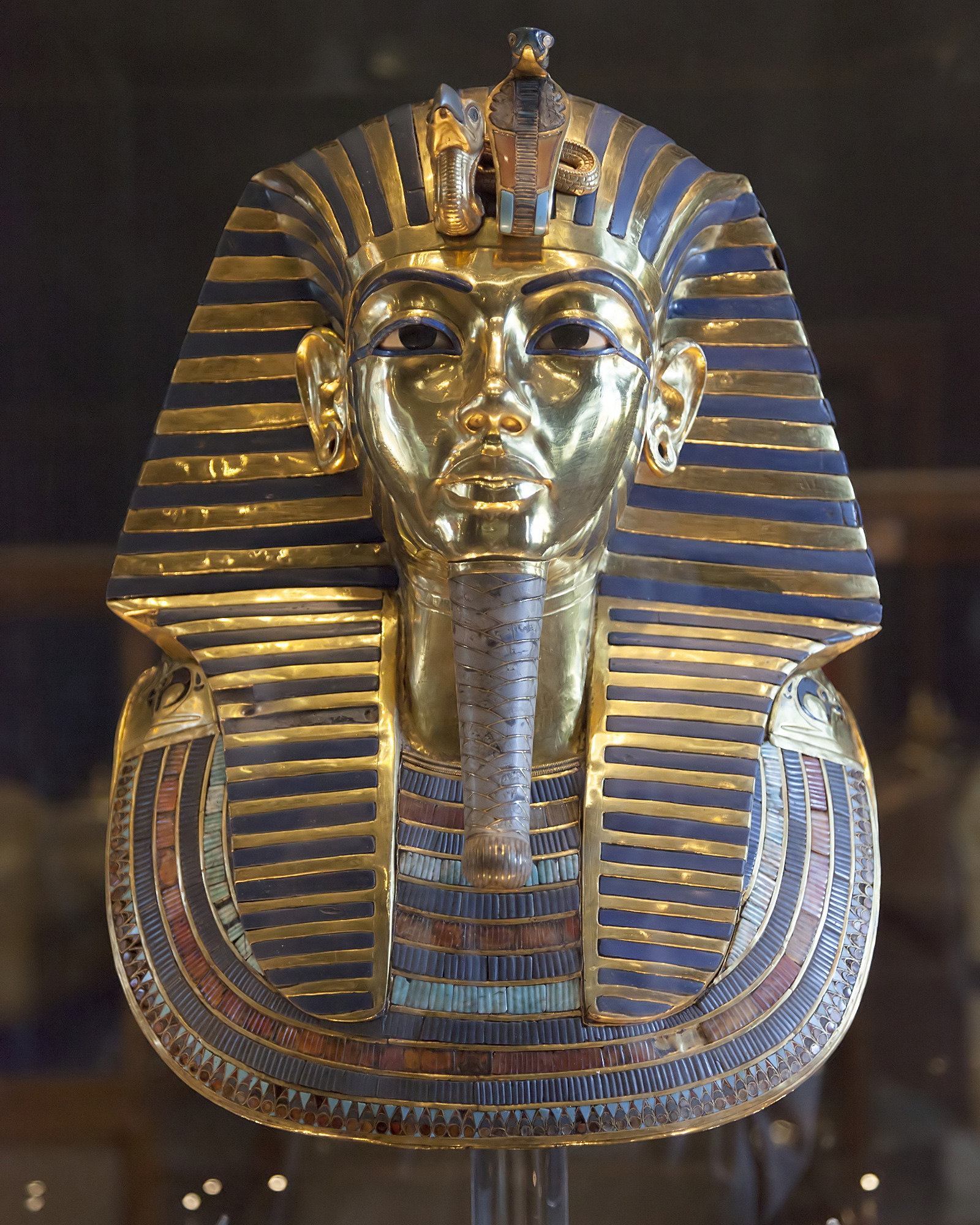
Tutankhamun's tomb was provided with vast quantities of wealth, such as the mask of Tutankhamun.

The majority of elite tombs in the New Kingdom were rock-cut chambers. Kings were buried in multi-roomed, rock-cut tombs in the Valley of the Kings and no longer in pyramids. Priests conducted funerary rituals for them in stone temples built on the west bank of the Nile opposite of Thebes.

From the current evidence, the Eighteenth Dynasty appears to be the last period in which Egyptians regularly included multiple objects from their daily lives in their tombs; beginning in the Nineteenth Dynasty, tombs contained fewer items from daily life and included objects made especially for the next world. Thus, the change from the Eighteenth to the Nineteenth Dynasties formed a dividing line in burial traditions: the Eighteenth Dynasty more closely remembered the immediate past in its customs, whereas, the Nineteenth Dynasty anticipated the customs of the Late period.

People of the elite ranks in the Eighteenth Dynasty placed furniture as well as clothing and other items in their tombs, objects they undoubtedly used during life on earth. Beds, headrests, chairs, stools, leather sandals, jewelry, musical instruments, and wooden storage chests were present in these tombs. While all of the objects listed were for the elite, many poor people did not put anything beyond weapons and cosmetics into their tombs.

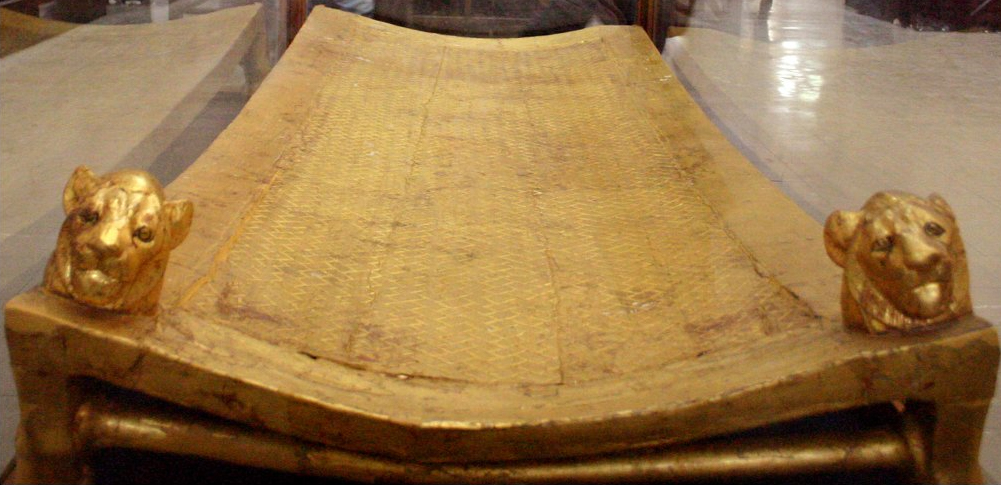
Gilded bier fashioned to resemble the goddess Sekhmet, the lioness who was the fierce protector of the kings in life and death, from the Eighteenth Dynasty tomb of Tutankhamun, (fourteenth century BC), Cairo Museum

No elite tombs are known to have survived unplundered from the Ramesside period. In that period, artists decorated tombs belonging to the elite with more scenes of religious events, rather than the everyday scenes that had been popular since the Old Kingdom. The funeral ceremony, the funerary meal with multiple relatives, the worshipping of the deities, even figures in the underworld were subjects in elite tomb decorations. The majority of objects found in the Ramesside period tombs were made for the afterlife. Aside from the jewelry, which could have been used also during life, objects in Ramesside tombs were manufactured for the next world.

=== Third Intermediate period ===
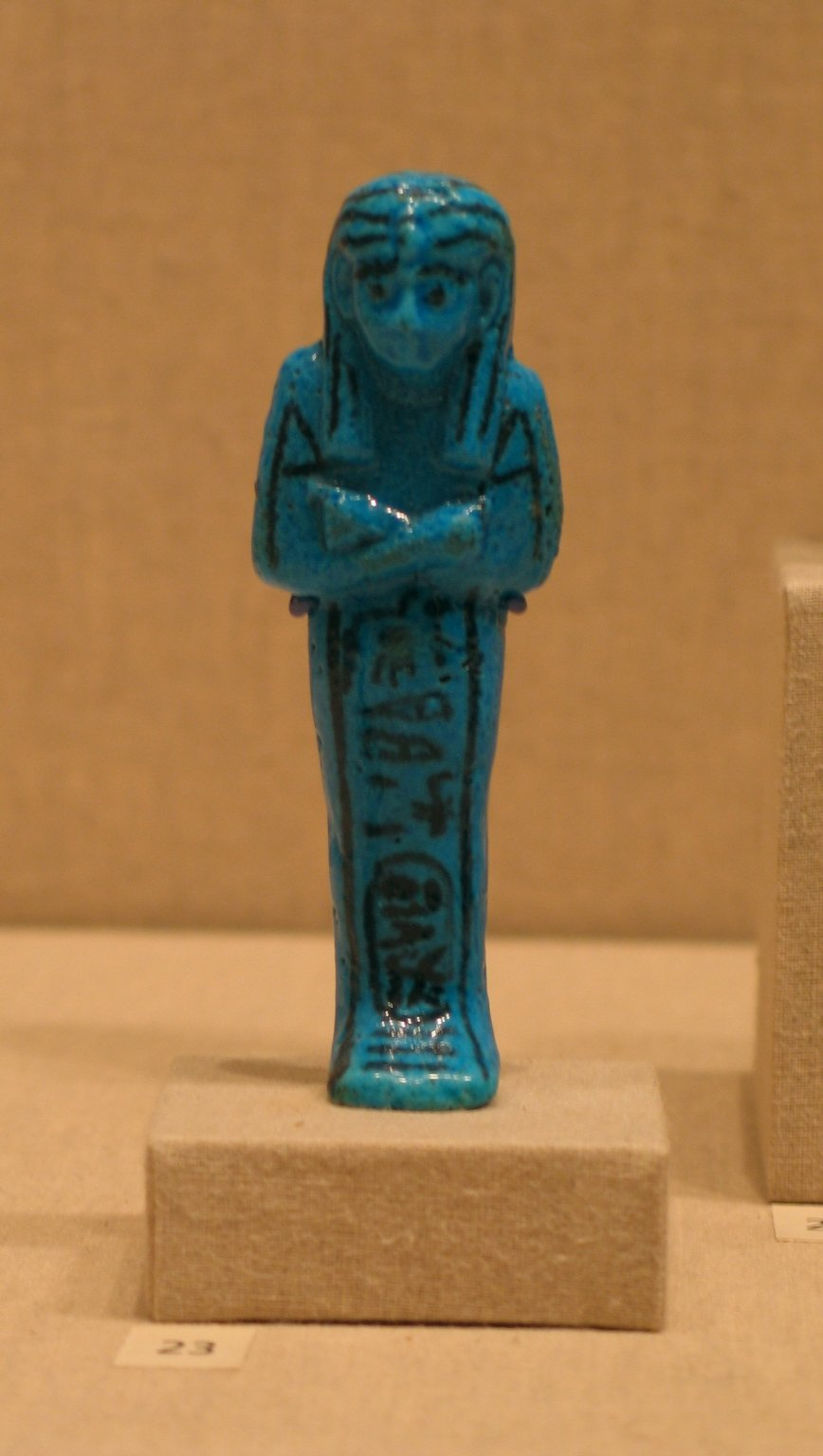
Shabtis of King Pinudjem I, c. 1025–1007 BCE, 16.190, Brooklyn Museum

Although the political structure of the New Kingdom collapsed at the end of the Twentieth Dynasty, the majority of burials in the Twenty-first Dynasty directly reflect developments from the earlier period. At the beginning of that time, reliefs resembled those from the Ramesside period. Only at the very end of the Third Intermediate period did new funerary practices of the Late period begin to be seen.

Little is known of tombs from that period. The very lack of decorations in tombs seems to have led to much more elaborate decoration of coffins. The remaining grave goods of the period show fairly cheaply made shabtis, even when the owner was a queen or a princess.

=== Late period, monumentality and return to traditions ===
Burials in the Late period could make use of large-scale, temple-like tombs built for the non-royal elite for the first time. But the majority of tombs in this period were in shafts sunk into the desert floor. In addition to fine statuary and reliefs reflecting the style of the Old Kingdom, the majority of grave goods were specially made for the tomb. Coffins continued to bear religious texts and scenes. Some shafts were personalized by the use of stela with personal prayers of and the name of the deceased on it. Shabtis in faience for all classes are known. Canopic jars, although often nonfunctional, continued to be included. Staves and scepters representing the deceased's office in life were often present as well. A wooden figure of either the god Osiris or of the composite deity Ptah-Sokar-Osiris could be found, along with heart scarabs, both gold and faience examples of djed-columns, Eye of Horus amulets, figures of deities, and images of the deceased's ba. Tools for the tomb's ritual called the "opening of the mouth" as well as "magical bricks" at the four compass points, could be included.

Substances recovered from vessels at an embalming workshop in Saqqara dated back to the 26th Dynasty contained extracts from juniper bushes, cypress and cedar trees in the eastern Mediterranean region, in addition to bitumen from the Dead Sea, locally produced animal fats and beeswax, and ingredients from distant places such as elemi and dammar from southeast Asia; while Pistacia resin and castor oil were used in particular for the treatment of the head.

=== Ptolemaic period, Hellenistic influences ===
Following the conquest of Egypt by Alexander the Great, the country was ruled by the descendants of Ptolemy, one of his generals. His Macedonian Greek family fostered a culture that promoted both Hellenistic and ancient Egyptian ways of life: many of the Greek-speaking people living in Alexandria followed the customs of mainland Greece, others adopted Egyptian customs, and indigenous Egyptians continued to follow their own already ancient customs.

Very few Ptolemaic tombs are known. Fine temple statuary of the period suggests the possibility of tomb sculpture and offering tables. Egyptian elite burials still made use of stone sarcophagi. The traditional Books of the Dead and amulets were also still popular.

=== Roman period, Roman influences ===
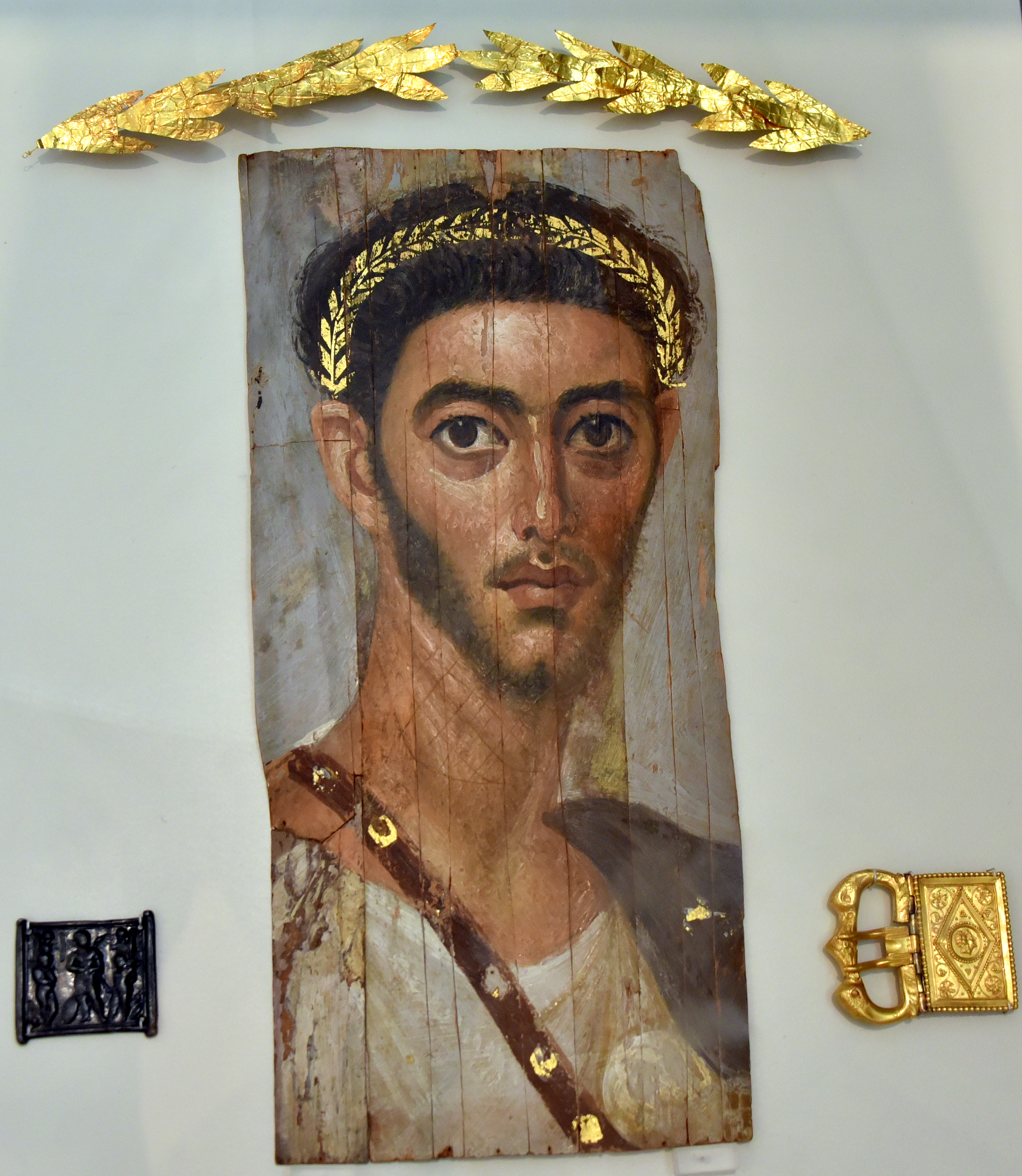
Encaustic painted mummy portrait of a Roman officer c. 130, with a blue sagum, silver fibula, white tunic, and red balteus, with related grave goods (Antikensammlung Berlin)

The Romans conquered Egypt in 30 BCE, ending the rule of the last and most famous member of the Ptolemaic dynasty, Cleopatra VII. During Roman rule, an elite hybrid burial style developed that incorporated both Egyptian and Roman elements.

Some people were mummified and wrapped in linen bandages. The front of the mummy was often painted with a selection of traditional Egyptian symbols. Mummy masks, in cartonnage, plaster, or stucco, in either traditional Egyptian style or Roman style, might be added to the mummies. Another possibility was a Roman-style mummy portrait, executed in encaustic (pigment suspended in wax) on a wooden panel. Sometimes the feet of the mummy were covered. An alternative to this was a complete shroud with Egyptian motifs, but a portrait in the Roman style. Tombs of the elite could also include fine jewelry. Gold armlets placed over the eyes and tongue were used in some cases. Mummification largely came to an end in the 5th century AD with remaining practices being ended by the Arab conquest of 641.

== Funerary rituals ==
Greek historians Herodotus (5th century BC) and Diodorus Siculus (1st century BC) provide the most complete surviving evidence of how ancient Egyptians approached the preservation of a dead body. Before embalming, or preserving the dead body as to delay or prevent decay, mourners, especially if the deceased had high status, covered their faces with mud, and paraded around town while beating their chests. If the wife of a high-status male died, her body was not embalmed until three or four days have passed, because this prevented abuse of the corpse. In the case that someone drowned or was attacked, embalming was carried out immediately on their body, in a sacred and careful manner. This kind of death was viewed as venerated, and only priests were permitted to touch the body.

After embalming, the mourners may have carried out a ritual involving an enactment of judgment during the Hour Vigil, with volunteers to play the role of Osiris and his enemy brother Set, as well as the deities Isis, Nephthys, Horus, Anubis, and Thoth. As the tale goes, Set was envious of his brother Osiris for being granted the throne before him, so he plotted to kill him. Osiris's wife, Isis, battled back and forth with Set to gain possession of Osiris's body, and through this struggle, Osiris's spirit was lost. Nonetheless, Osiris resurrected and was reinstated as a god. In addition to the reenactment of the judgment of Osiris, numerous funeral processions were conducted throughout the nearby necropolis, which symbolized different sacred journeys.

The funeral procession to the tomb generally included cattle pulling the body in a sledge-type of carrier, with friends and family to follow. During the procession, the priest burned incense and poured milk before the dead body. Upon arrival to the tomb, and essentially the next life, the priest performed the Opening of the mouth ceremony on the deceased. The deceased's head was turned toward the south, and the body was imagined to be a statue replica of the deceased. Opening the mouth of the deceased symbolized allowing the person to speak and defend themselves during the judgment process. Goods were then offered to the deceased to conclude the ceremony.

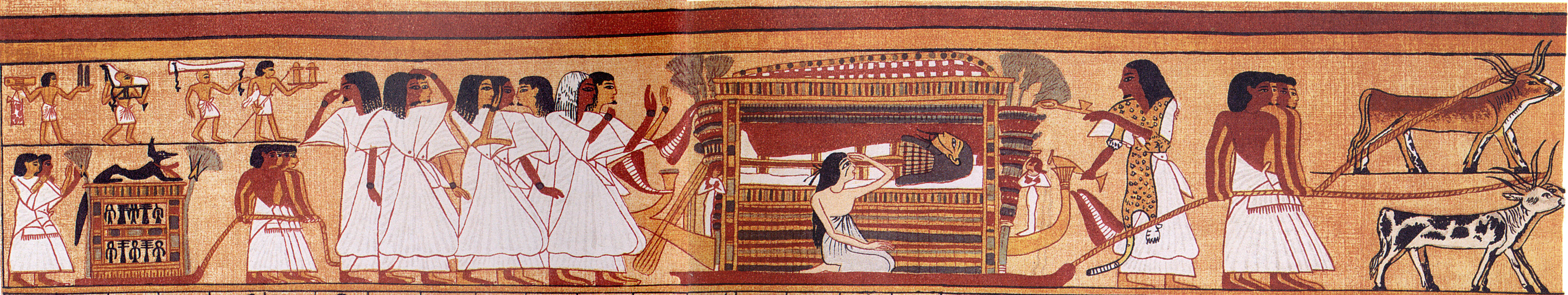
A funeral procession depicted in the Book of the Dead (Extract from the Papyrus of Ani, 19th Dynasty, c. 1250 BCE)

== Mummification ==
=== Embalming ===
The preservation of a dead body was critical if the deceased wanted a chance at acceptance into the afterlife. Within the Ancient Egyptian concept of the soul, ka, which represented vitality, leaves the body once the person dies. Only if the body is embalmed in a specific fashion will ka return to the deceased body, and rebirth will take place. The embalmers received the body after death, and in a systematized manner, prepared it for mummification. The family and friends of the deceased had a choice of options that ranged in price for the preparation of the body, similar to the process at modern funeral homes. Next, the embalmers escorted the body to ibw, translated to “place of purification”, a tent in which the body was washed, and then per nefer, “the House of Beauty”, where mummification took place.

=== Mummification process ===
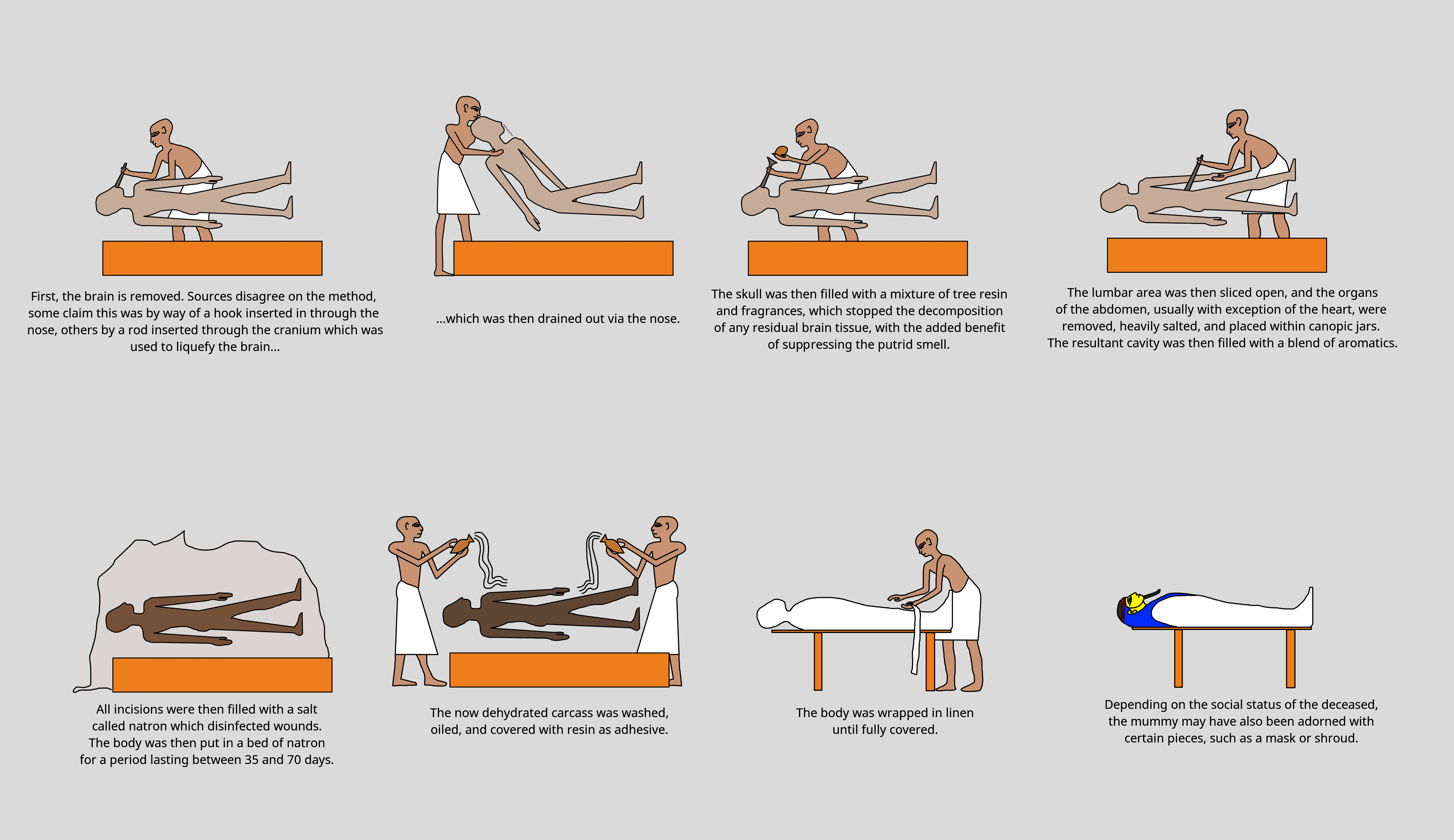
Simplistic representation of the Ancient Egyptian mummification process

In order to live for all eternity and be presented in front of Osiris, the body of the deceased had to be preserved by mummification, so that the soul could reunite with it, and take pleasure in the afterlife. The main process of mummification was preserving the body by dehydrating it using natron, a natural salt found in Wadi Natrun. The body was drained of any liquids and left with the skin, hair, and muscles preserved. The mummification process is said to have taken up to seventy days. During this process, special priests worked as embalmers as they treated and wrapped the body of the deceased in preparation for burial.

The process of mummification was available for anyone who could afford it. It was believed that even those who could not afford this process could still enjoy the afterlife with the recitation of the correct spells. Mummification existed in three different processes, ranging from most expensive, moderately expensive, and most simplistic, or least expensive. The most classic, common, and most expensive method of mummification dates back to the eighteenth dynasty. The first step was to remove the internal organs and liquid so that the body would not decay. After being laid out on a table, the embalmers took out the brain through a process named excerebration by inserting a metal hook through the nostril, breaking through it into the brain. They removed as much as they could with the hook, and the rest they liquefied with drugs and drained out. They threw out the brain because they thought that the heart did all the thinking. The next step was to remove the internal organs, the lungs, liver, stomach, and intestines, and to place them in canopic jars with lids shaped as the heads of the protective deities, the four sons of Horus: Imsety, Hapy, Duamutef, and Qebhseneuf. Imsety was human-headed and guarded the liver; Hapy was ape-headed and guarded the lungs; Duamutef was jackal-headed and guarded the stomach; Qebhseneuf was hawk-headed and guarded the small and large intestines.^{[25]} Sometimes the four canopic jars were placed into a canopic chest and buried with the mummified body. A canopic chest resembled a "miniature coffin" and was intricately painted. The Ancient Egyptians believed that by burying their organs with the deceased, they may rejoin in the afterlife.^{[26]} Other times, the organs were cleaned and cleansed, and then returned into the body. The body cavity was then rinsed and cleaned with wine and an array of spices. The body was sewn up with aromatic plants and spices left inside. The heart stayed in the body, because in the hall of judgment, it would be weighed against the feather of Maat. After the body was washed with wine, it was stuffed with bags of natron. The dehydration process took around 35 to 40 days.^{[27]}

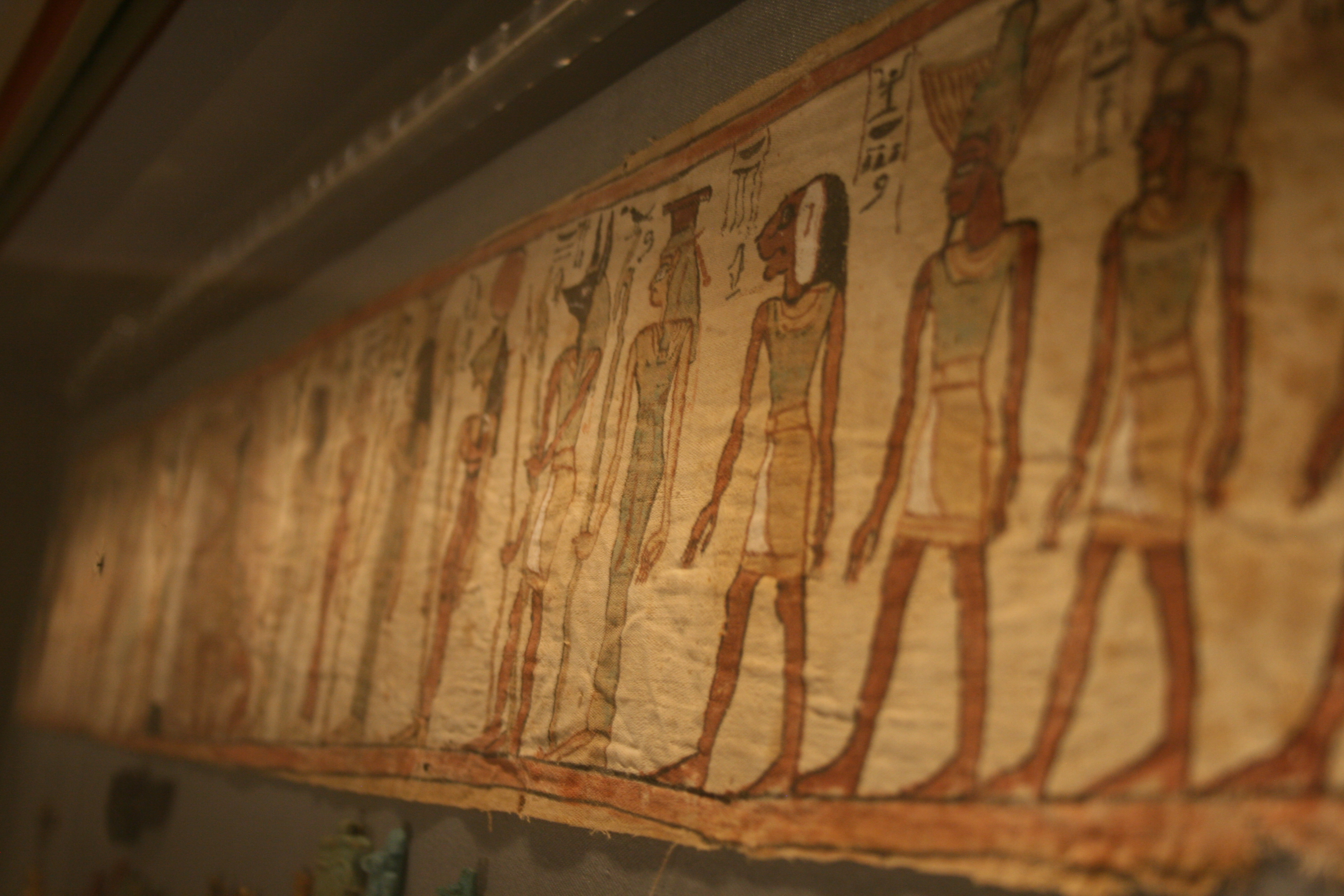
Painted mummy bandage

The second part of the process took 30 days. This was the time when the deceased turned into a semi divine being, and all that was left in the body from the first part was removed, followed by applying first wine and then oils. The oils were for ritual purposes, as well as for preventing the limbs and bones from breaking while being wrapped. The body was sometimes colored with a golden resin, which protected the body from bacteria and insects. Additionally, this practice was based on the belief that divine beings had flesh of gold. Next, the body was wrapped in linen cut into strips with amulets while a priest recited prayers and burned incense. The linen was adhered to the body using gum, opposed to a glue. The dressing provided the body physical protection from the elements, and depending on how wealthy the deceased's family was, the deceased could be dressed with an ornamented funeral mask and shroud. Special care was given to the head, hands, feet, and genitals, as contemporary mummies reveal extra wrappings and paddings in these areas. Mummies were identified via small, wooden name-tags tied typically around the deceased's neck. The 70-day process is connected to Osiris and the length the star Sothis was absent from the sky.^{[28]}

The second, moderately expensive option for mummification did not involve an incision into the abdominal cavity or the removal of the internal organs. Instead, the embalmers injected the oil of a cedar tree into the body, which prevented liquid from leaving the body. The body was then laid in natron for a specific number of days. The oil was then drained out of the body, and with it came the internal organs, the stomach and the intestines, which were liquefied by the cedar oil. The flesh dissolved in the natron, which left only skin and bones left of the deceased body. The remains are given back to the family. The cheapest, most basic method of mummification, which was often chosen by the poor, involved purging out the deceased's internal organs, and then laying the body in natron for 70 days. The body was then given back to the family.

=== Animal mummification ===
Animals were mummified in Ancient Egypt for many reasons. Household pets that held a special importance to their owners were buried alongside them. However, animals were not only viewed as pets, but as incarnations of the deities. Most Ancient Egyptian deities were associated with particular animals, frequently being depicted as such animals or as humans with the heads of such animals. Therefore, animals associated with particular gods were buried to honor those deities. Some animal mummifications were performed to serve as sacred offerings to the deities who often took the form of animals such as cats, frogs, cows, baboons, and vultures. Other animals were mummified with the intention of being a food offering to humans in the afterlife.

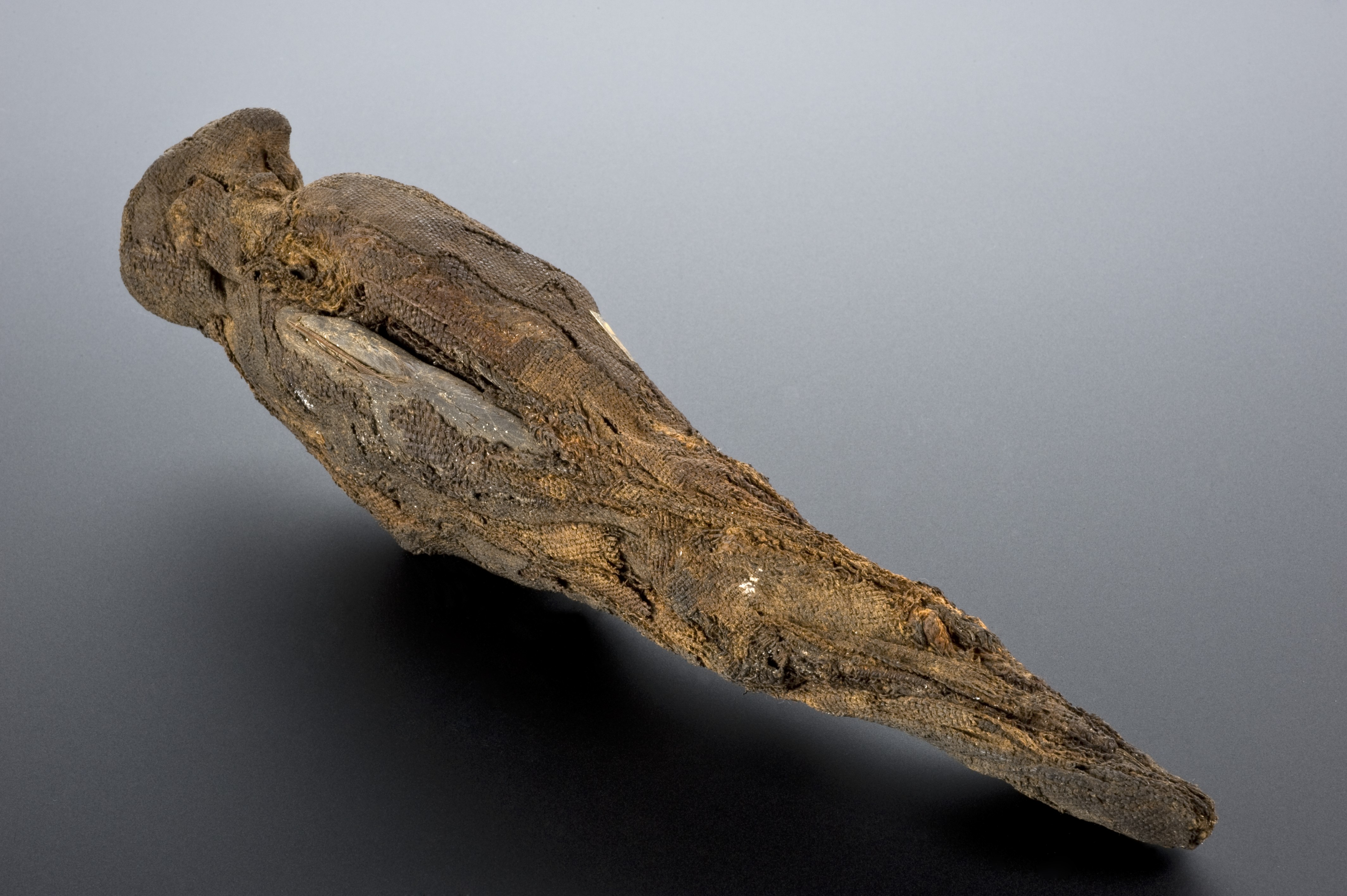
Mummy of a peregrine falcon c. 2000–1001 BCE

Several kinds of animal remains have been discovered in tombs in the area of Dayr al-Barsha, a Coptic village in Middle Egypt. The remains found in the shafts and burial chambers included dogs, foxes, eagle owls, bats, rodents, and snakes. These were determined to be individuals that had entered the deposits by accident, however.

Other animal remains that were found were more common and recurred more than those individuals who wound up accidentally trapped in these tombs. These remains included numerous gazelle and cattle bones, as well as calves and goats that were believed to have been as a result of human behavior. This was due to finding that some remains had fragments altered, missing, or separated from their original skeletons. These remains also had traces of paint and cut marks on them, seen especially with cattle skulls and feet.

Based on this, the natural environment of the Dayr al-Barsha tombs, and the fact that only some parts of these animals were found, the possibility of natural deposition can be ruled out, and the cause of these remains in fact are most likely caused by animal sacrifices, as only the head, foreleg, and feet were apparently selected for deposition within the tombs. According to a study by Christopher Eyre, cattle meat was not a part of the daily diet in Ancient Egypt, as the consumption of meat only took place during celebrations, including funerary and mortuary rituals, and the practice of providing the deceased with offerings of cattle as early as the Predynastic period.

== Burial rituals ==
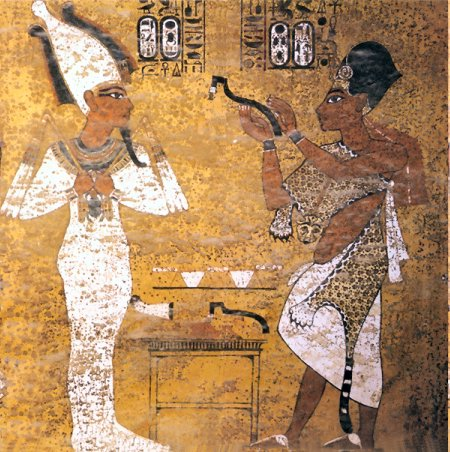
Ay, with a leopard skin, performing the opening of the mouth for Tutankhamun. Wall painting from the Tomb of Tutankhamun (KV 62) (18th Dynasty, c. 1325 BCE).

After the mummy was prepared, it would need to be re-animated, symbolically, by a priest. The opening of the mouth ceremony was conducted by a priest who would utter a spell and touch the mummy or sarcophagus with a ceremonial adze – a copper or stone blade. This ceremony ensured that the mummy could breathe and speak in the afterlife. In a similar fashion, the priest could utter spells to reanimate the mummy's arms, legs, and other body parts.

The priests, maybe even the king's successor, proceeded to move the body of the embalmed dead king through the causeway to the mortuary temple. This is where prayers were recited, incense was burned, and more rituals were performed to help prepare the king for the final journey. The king's mummy was then placed inside the pyramid along with enormous amounts of food, drink, furniture, clothes, and jewelry that were to be used in the afterlife. The pyramid was sealed so that no one would ever enter it again, although the king's soul could move through the burial chamber at will. After the funeral, kings become deities and could be worshipped in the temples beside their pyramid.

The Egyptians believed that, after death, the deceased could still have such feelings of anger or hold a grudge as during life, as well as feel affection for and concern over the welfare of their still-living family. Hence, the deceased were expected to support and help their living family. They specifically believed that the abilities of the Ba and Ka are what enabled the dead to support their family: the Ba made it possible for an invisible twin to be released from the body to support the family, while the Ka would recognize the twin when it would come back to the body. With the ideas of the dead being so valuable, it is clear why the Egyptians treated the deceased with respect.

Less fortunate Egyptians still wanted their family members to be given a proper burial. A typical burial would be held in the desert, where the family would wrap the body in a cloth and bury it with everyday objects so they would be comfortable in the afterlife. Although some commoners could and did afford mummification, most could not due to the expense. Often, poorer Ancient Egyptians are found in mass graves, not mummified and only with minimal household objects. Sites were located throughout the desert, often in areas that are now populated.

== Tombs ==
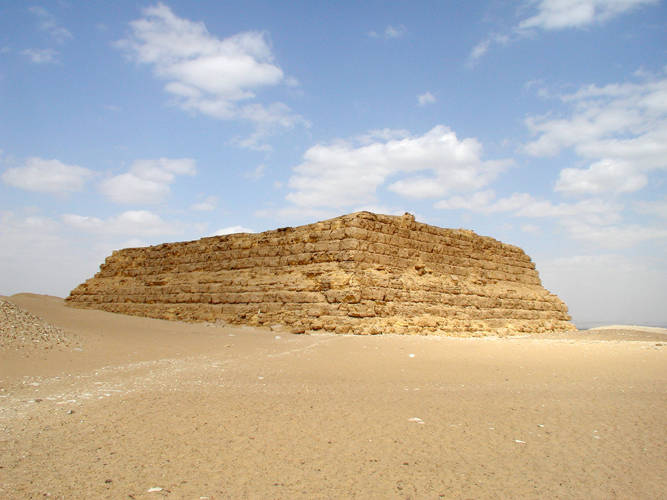
Mastabat al-Fir'aun, the mastaba tomb of King Shepseskaf (4th Dynasty, c. 2505 BCE)

The tomb was the housing for the deceased and served two crucial functions: the tomb provided infinite protection for the deceased to rest, as well as a place for mourners to perform rituals in which aided the deceased into eternal life. Therefore, the ancient Egyptians were very serious about the way in which the tombs were built. Two hallmarks of the tomb included: a burial chamber, which housed the physical body of the deceased (inside a coffin) as well as funerary objects deemed most important, and a "cult place," which resembled a chapel where mourners, family, and friends could congregate. The tomb of a king included a full temple, rather than a chapel.

Typically, the tomb of a deceased person was located somewhere close by their home community. The ancient Egyptians opted to bury the deceased in land that was not particularly fertile or useful for vegetation. Therefore, tombs were mostly built in desert areas. Tombs were usually built near each other and rarely stood alone. For a deceased king, however, the tomb was located in a place of utmost sacredness.

In Prehistoric Egypt, bodies were buried in deserts and they would naturally be preserved by dehydration. The "graves" were small oval or rectangular pits dug in the sand. They placed the body of the deceased in a tight position on its left side with a few jars of food and drink and slate palettes with magical religious spells alongside. The size of graves eventually increased according to status and wealth. The dry, desert conditions were a benefit in ancient Egypt for burials of the poor, who could not afford the complex burial preparations that the wealthy had.

The simple graves evolved into mudbrick structures called mastabas. Royal mastabas later developed into step pyramids and then "true pyramids." As soon as a king took the throne construction of the burial pyramid would begin. Rituals of the burial, including the "Opening of the mouth ceremony" took place at the Valley Temple. While a pyramid's large size was made to protect against robbery, it may also be connected to a religious belief about the sun god, Ra.

A majority of cemeteries were located on the west bank of the Nile, which was viewed metaphorically as "the realm of the dead". The tomb was said to represent the deceased's place in the cosmos, which ultimately depended on the social class of the deceased. If the deceased was of a notably high status, they were buried near the king, whereas middle and lower status individuals were simply buried near the communities in which they had lived. In many cases, the tombs of those of high-status were situated relatively to the tombs of those of lower status so that they would be viewed as a "focal point". For example, one burial site was designed so that the tombs of the governors were placed alongside the slope of a hill, whereas the tombs of the governor's attendants were placed at the foot of the hill.

== Coffins ==
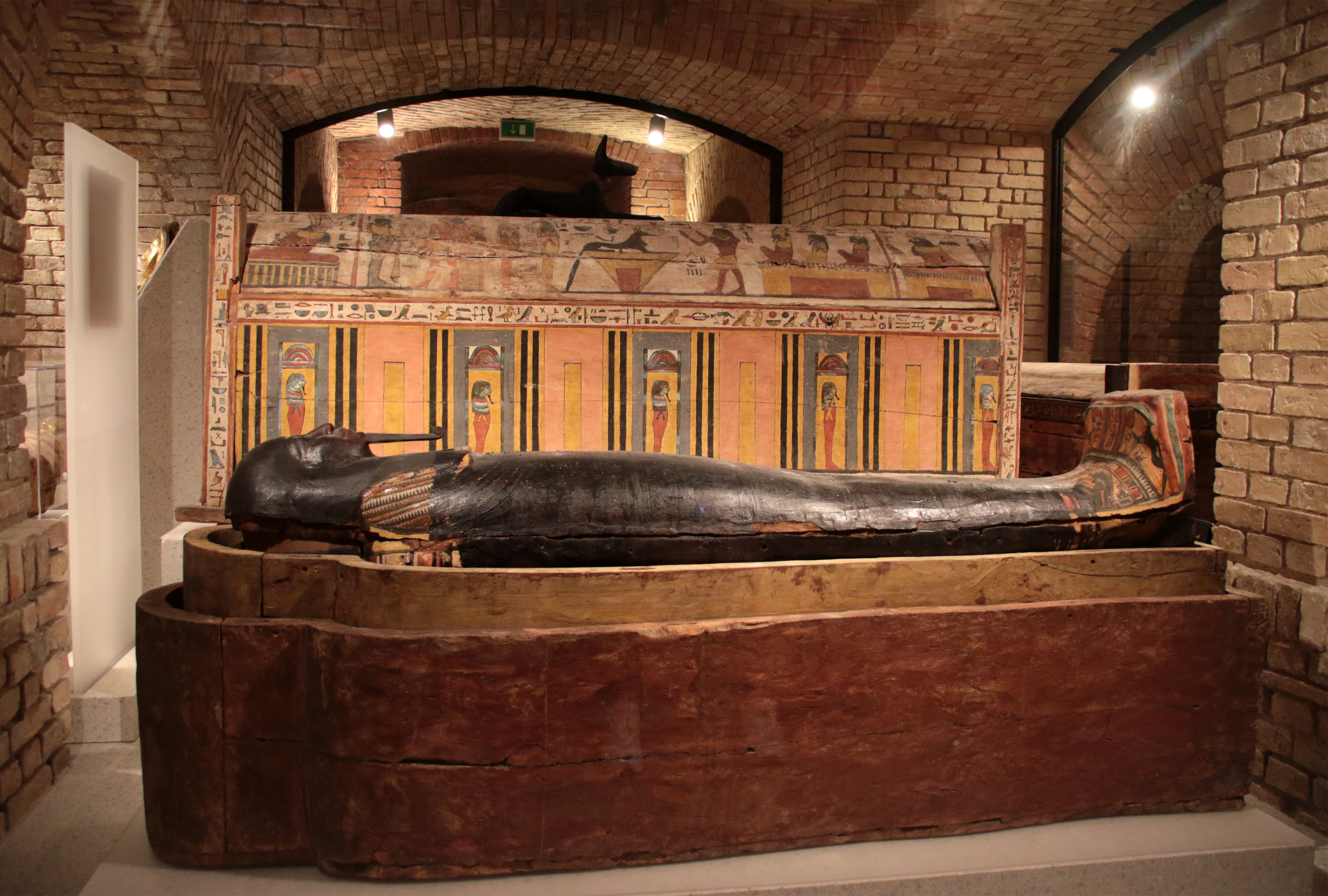
Anthropoid coffin and sarcophagus of priest Ken-Hor (26th Dynasty, c. 7th century BCE), in the Ägyptisches Museum Berlin

After having been preserved, the mummy was placed into a coffin. Although the coffins that housed the deceased bodies were made simply of wood, they were intricately painted and designed to suit each individual. During the Old Kingdom, the following was included on each coffin: the title of the deceased, a list of offerings, a false compartment through which ka could pass through, and painted eyes so that the deceased could look through the coffin. The decorations on the coffin usually fit the deceased's status.

During the Middle Kingdom, the coffin was treated as if it were a "miniature tomb" and was painted and inscribed as such. Images of the goddesses Isis and Nephthys were painted on the coffins, and were said to guard the deceased in the afterlife. Along the sides of the coffins amongst other deities, the four sons of Horus were painted. Prayers were often inscribed on the coffins as well.

Anthropoid coffins soon emerged, which were tailored to the contour of the deceased's body. The deceased's face and hair was painted onto the coffin so to personalize it further. A sarcophagus, which is a large, stone container, was used to house the coffin, and provide supplementary protection to the dead body.

== Damnation ==
One of the funerary practices followed by the Egyptians was preparing properly for the afterlife. Ka, the vital force within the Ancient Egyptian concept of the soul, would not return to the deceased body if embalming was not carried out in the proper fashion. In that case, the body decayed, and possibly became unrecognizable, which rendered the afterlife unattainable for the deceased person. If the proper precautions were not taken, damnation would occur. Damnation meant that Egyptians would not experience the glories of the afterlife where they became a deified figure and would be welcomed by the deities. Instead, damnation was depicted in the books of the underworld. It was a place of opposites; chaos, fire, and struggle. Different pages of the books of the underworld depict different perspectives of what happens during damnation. It discusses cutting out humanity and individuality from the person and reversing the cosmic order.

== Judgment ==
The idea of judgment went as follows: in order to be considered for the admittance into the afterlife, those who died were obligated to undergo a multi-step judgment by certain deities. Egyptian beliefs regarding the afterlife also consisted of hope for renewed life after one's death. In order to convey this, tree imagery was used in funerary, which represented the concept of revivification. The concept and belief in judgment is outlined in the Book of the Dead, a funerary text of the New Kingdom. The Book of the Dead is composed of spells relating to the deceased and the afterlife. Spell 125, in particular, is understood to be delivered by the deceased at the outset of the judgment process. With spell 125, the deceased become subject to a series of declarations in which they deny having committed specific wrongful acts. This purpose of it is to test whether the individual is worthy to enter.

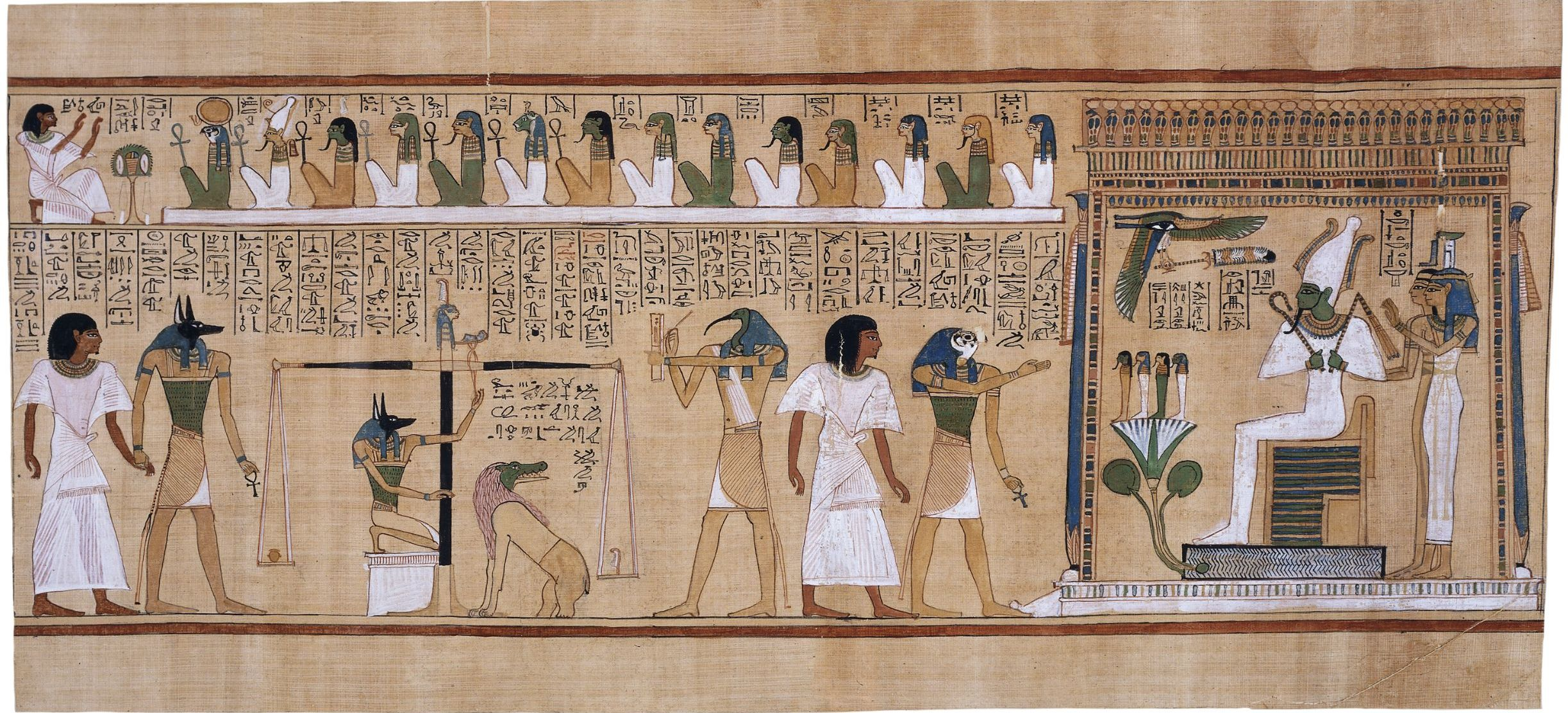
The Weighing of the Heart as depicted in the Papyrus of Hunefer (19th Dynasty, c. 1300 BCE)

The visual depiction of what judgment looks like has been discovered through ancient Egyptian ruins and artifacts. The deceased person's heart is depicted as being weighed against Maat's feather. In the judgment scene, Ammit is shown to be standing right beside the scales and is associated with the consequences of an unsuccessful judgment. The procedure was depicted as follows: the deceased's heart was weighed in comparison to the feather of Maat, while Ammit awaited to eat the heart if the deceased was found to be a sinner. Among other deities, Osiris was a judge and represented an ideal output of the judgment process for the deceased who entered the judgment hall. This is because Osiris resurrected and regained his godly status after he was justified against his brother Set, who wrongly murdered him. Osiris was also associated with the deceased's hope for renewal after death. His connection with the deceased was depicted in Ancient Egypt funerary imagery, which did illustrate the symbolism of revivification. The deceased pleaded to Osiris that they had not committed sin, which is known as a "negative confession". They also addressed the forty-two divine assessors, stating that they had not committed wrongdoings, which was also a part of the "negative confession". The forty-two Assessors of Maat judged how virtuous the life of the deceased was, and this represented the principal element of the deceased entering the afterlife. After passing judgment, the family and friends of the deceased celebrated them and boasted about their righteousness to attain entry into the afterlife.

== Funerary texts ==
Many mummies were provided with some form of funerary literature to take with them to the afterlife. Most funerary literature consists of lists of spells and instructions for navigating the afterlife. During the Old Kingdom, only the king had access to this material, which scholars refer to as the Pyramid Texts. The Pyramid Texts are a collection of spells to assure the royal resurrection and protect the king from various malignant influences. Unas was the first to use this collection of spells, as he and a few subsequent kings had the texts carved on the walls of their pyramids. These texts were individually chosen from a larger bank of spells.

In the First Intermediate Period and in the Middle Kingdom, some of the Pyramid Text spells also are found in burial chambers of high officials and on many coffins, where they begin to evolve into what scholars call the Coffin Texts. In this period, the nobles and many non-royal Egyptians began to have access to funerary literature. Although many spells from the earlier texts were carried over, the new coffin texts also had additional spells, along with slight changes made to make this new funerary text more fit for the nobility.

In the New Kingdom, the Coffin Texts became the Book of the Dead, or the Funeral Papyri, and they were used through the Late Kingdom. The text in these books was divided according to chapters and spells, which were almost two-hundred in number. Each one of these texts was individualized for the deceased, although to varying degrees. If the person was wealthy enough, then they could commission their own personal version of the text that would include only the spells that they wanted. However, if one was not so wealthy, then one had to make do with mass-produced standardized versions generated with spaces left for insertion of the name of the deceased.

If the scribe ran out of room while doing the transcription, it would just stop without completion. It is not until the Twenty-sixth Dynasty that there began to be any regulation of the order or even the number of spells that were to be included in the Book of the Dead. At that time, the regulation was set at 192 spells to be placed in the book, with certain ones holding the same place at all times. This makes it seem as if for many of them, the order of the texts was not so important as that it be included among the spells.

== Burial goods ==
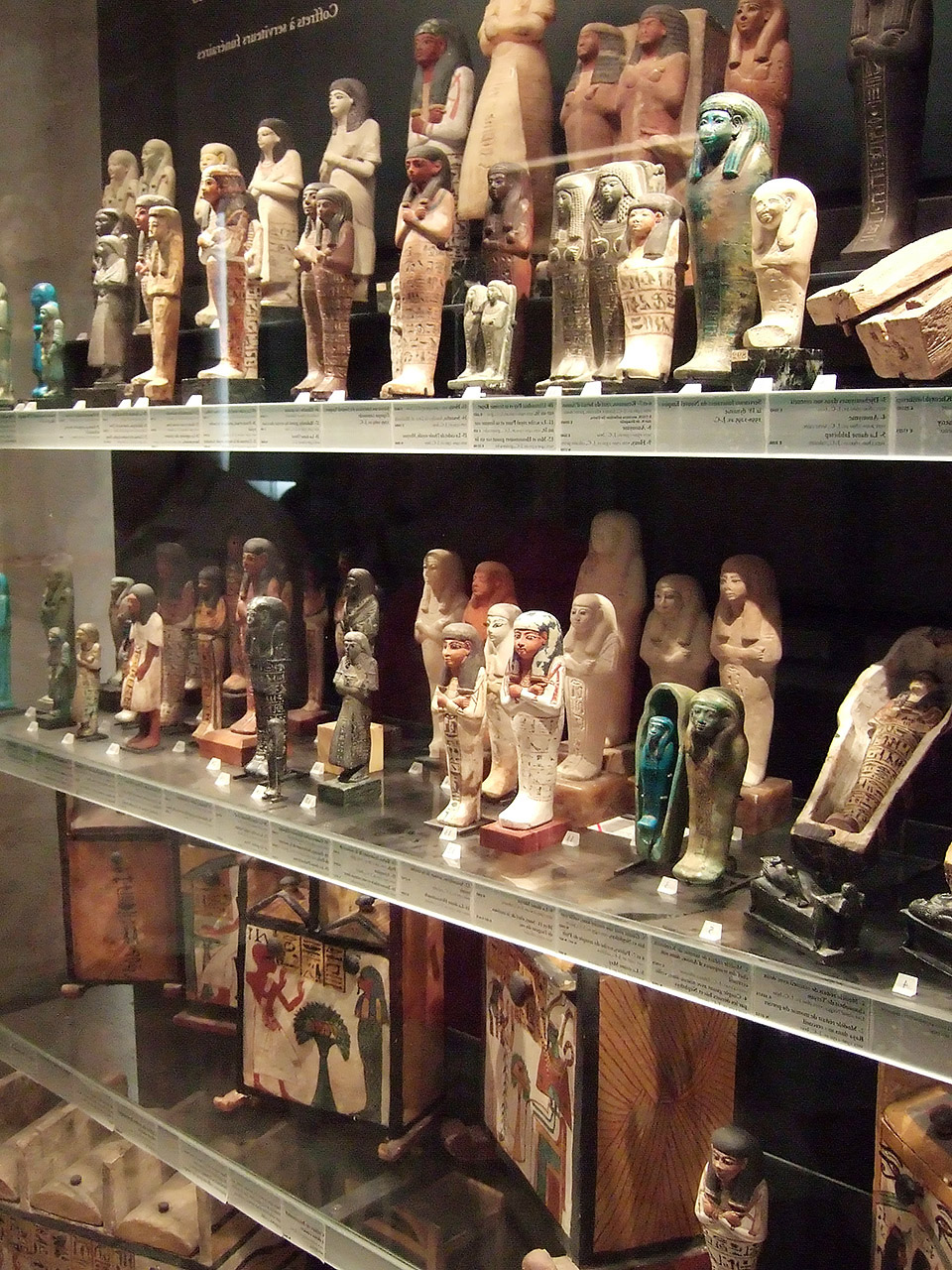
A selection of shabti statues

Although the types of burial goods changed throughout ancient Egyptian history, their purpose to protect the deceased and provide sustenance in the afterlife remained.

From the earliest periods of Egyptian history, all Egyptians were buried with at least some goods that they thought were necessary after death. At a minimum, these consisted of everyday objects such as bowls, combs, and other trinkets, along with food. Wealthier Egyptians could afford to be buried with jewelry, furniture, and other valuables, which made them targets of tomb robbers. In the early Dynastic Period, tombs were filled with daily life objects, such as furniture, jewelry, and other valuables. They also contained many stone and pottery vessels. One important factor in the development of Ancient Egyptian tombs was the need for storage space for the funerary goods.

As burial customs developed in the Old Kingdom, wealthy citizens were buried in wooden or stone coffins. However, the number of burial goods declined. They were often just a set of copper models of tools and vessels. Starting in the First Intermediate period, wooden models became very popular burial goods. These wooden models often depict everyday activities that the deceased expected to continue doing in the afterlife. Also, a type of rectangular coffin became the standard, being brightly painted and often including an offering formula. Objects of daily use were not often included in the tombs during that period.

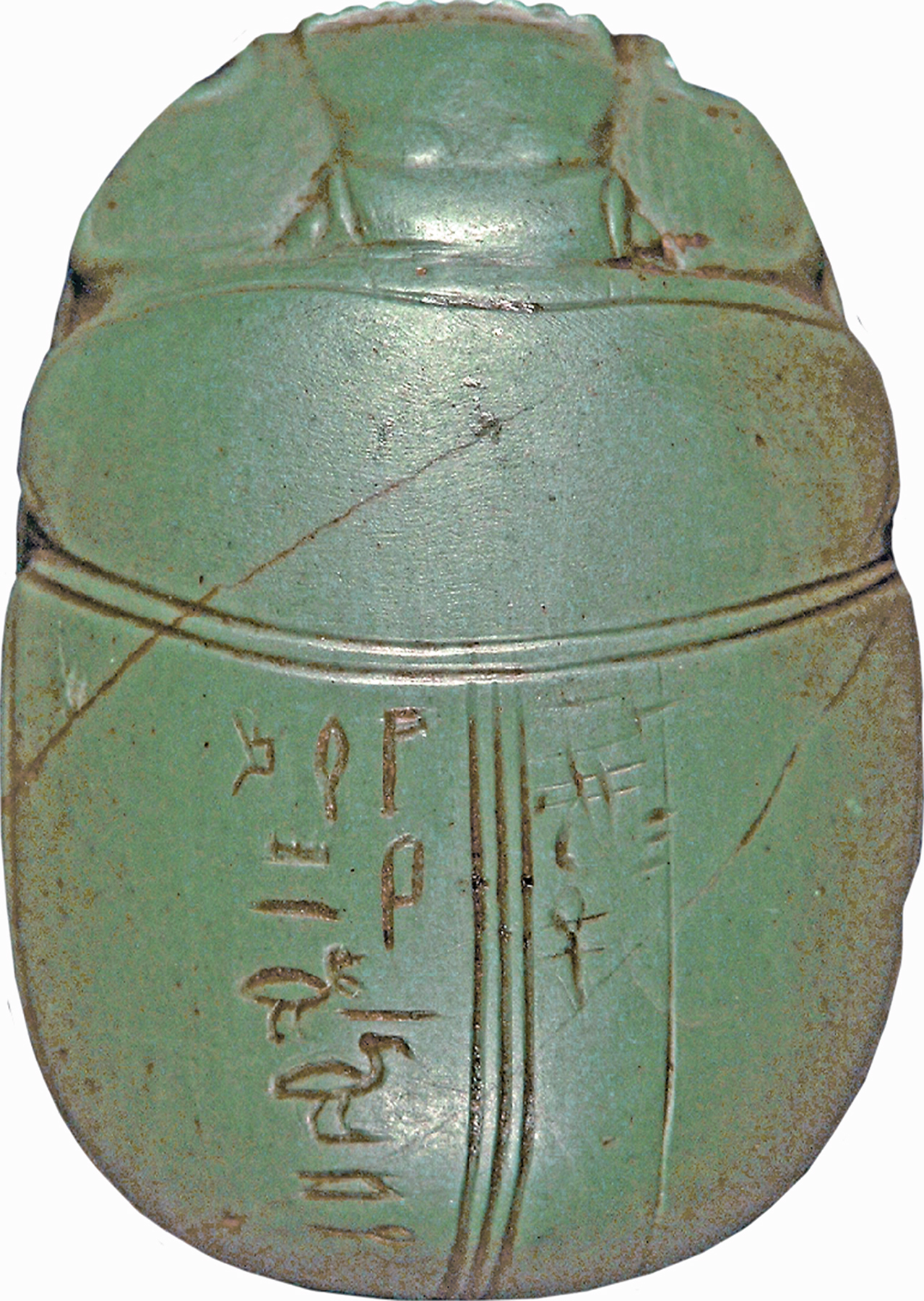
The ancient Egyptians put green stone scarab beetles into the coffins of important people, along with the mummified bodies. Late New Kingdom or Third Intermediate Period (c. 12th century-8th century BCE)

At the end of the Middle Kingdom, new object types were introduced into burials, such as the first shabtis and the first heart scarabs. Shabtis were little clay statues made to perform tasks on command for the king. During that period objects of daily use appear in tombs again having become magical items also employed for protecting the living. Scarabs (beetles) collect animal dung and roll it into little balls. To the Egyptians, these balls resembled the life-giving Sun, so they hoped that scarabs would bring them long life. Scarabs have been found in tombs and graves.

In the New Kingdom, some of the old burial customs changed. For example, an anthropoid coffin shape became standardized and the deceased were provided with a small shabti statue, which the Egyptians believed would perform work for them in the afterlife. Elite burials were often filled with objects of daily use. Under Ramesses II and later, all daily life objects disappear from tombs. Most often burials at that time only contained a selection of items especially made for the burial. Also, in later burials, the numbers of shabti statues increased; in some burials, numbering more than four hundred statues. In addition to these shabti statues, the deceased could be buried with many different types of magical figurines to protect them from harm.

== Funerary boats ==
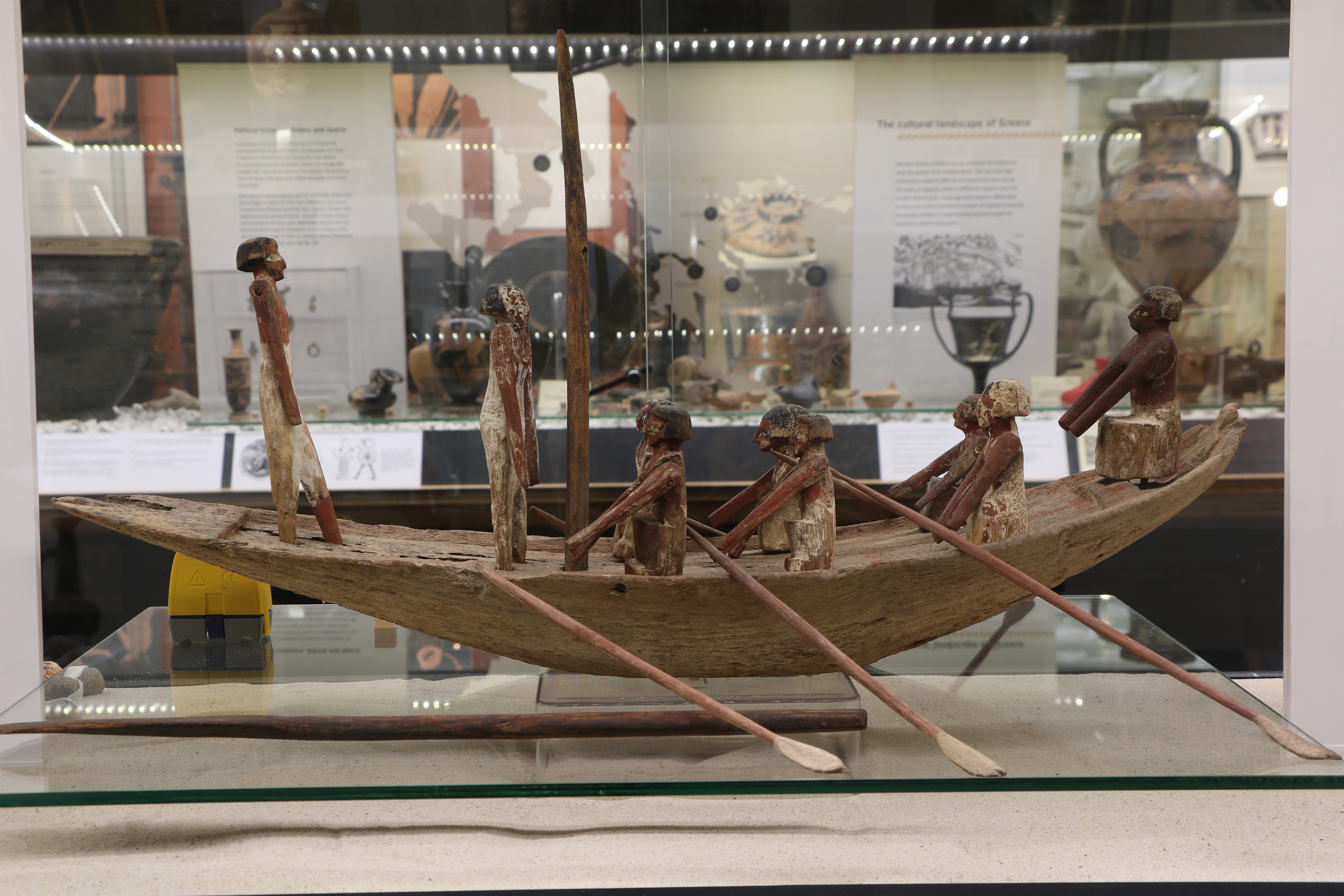
Ancient Egyptian funerary boat on display at the Ure Museum from the "Tomb of the Officials" at Beni Hassan (12th Dynasty, c. 19th century BCE)

Funerary boats were a part of some ancient Egyptian burials. Boats played a major role in Egyptian religion because they were conceived as the main means by which the deities traveled across the sky and through to the netherworld. One type of boat used at funerals was for making pilgrimages to holy sites such as Abydos. A large funerary boat, for example, was found near a royal pyramid from the Old Kingdom for Khufu. The funerary boats were usually made of wood; the Egyptians used a collection of papyrus reeds and tied them together with the wood very tightly. The most common route for funerary boats to the afterlife was the River Nile. The boat carried the coffin and often had a dog in the boat since they believed a dog would lead the deceased to the afterlife. The boats usually measured about 20 feet or longer. These however did not match those of the great kings such as Khufu (who built the Great Pyramid). His funerary boat was approximately 144 feet long with 12 oars. Common funerary boats were smaller sized with fewer oars.

At the Ure Museum, there is an Egyptian funerary boat on display that represents a typical tomb offering. This boat symbolizes the transport of the dead from life to the afterlife. In Ancient Egypt death was seen as a journey by boat. More specifically, it was seen as a trip across their River Nile that joined the North and South. This funerary boat offering from the "Tomb of the Officials" at Beni Hassan, was added to the museum collection in 1923 from the Liverpool Institute of Archaeology.

== Modern study of Egyptian mummies ==
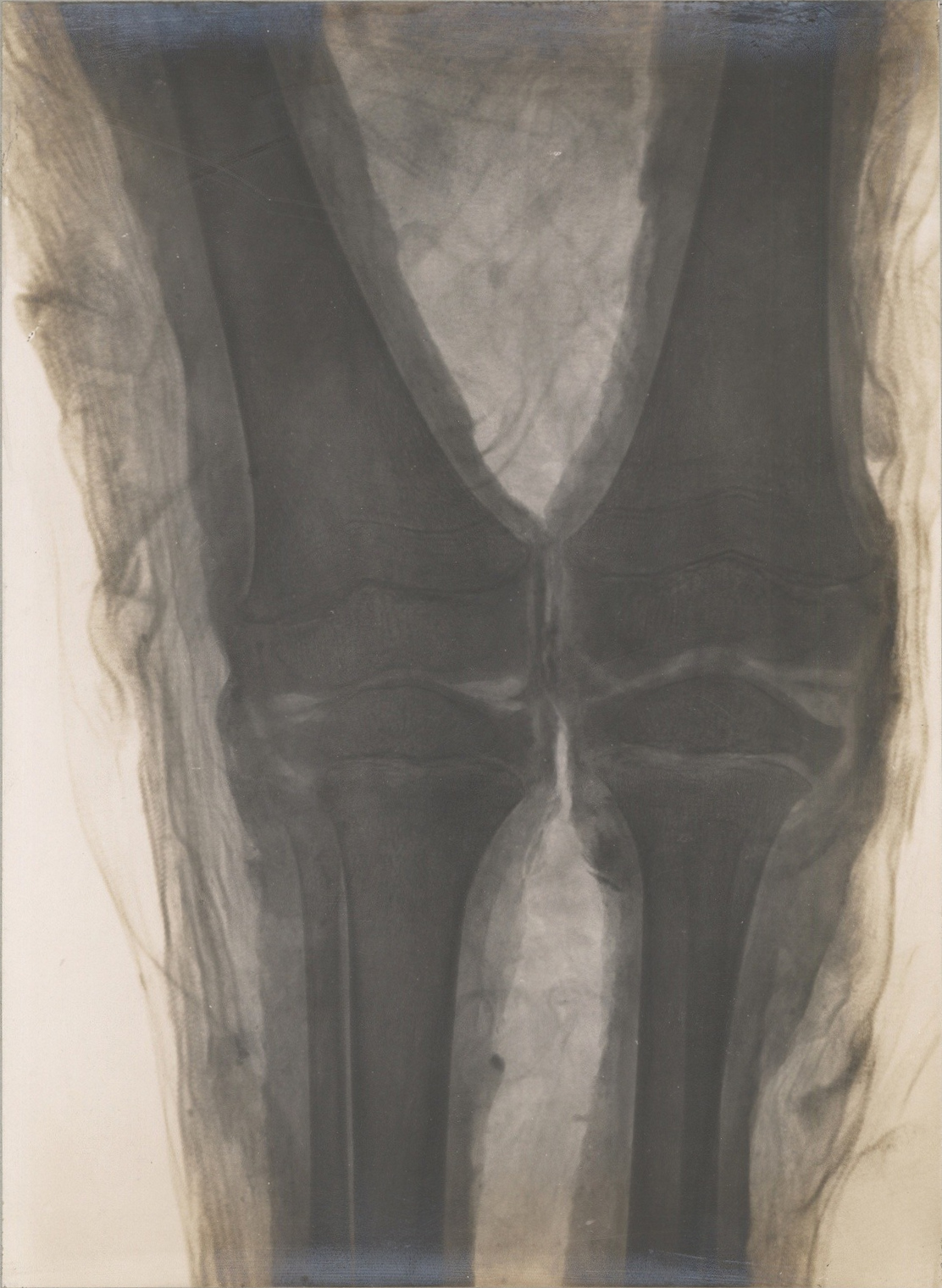
The first X-ray of a mummified Egyptian showing the knees of a child mummy in the collection of Naturmuseum Senckenberg

In addition to sources by ancient writers and modern scientists, a better understanding of the Ancient Egyptian mummification process is promoted through the study of mummies. The majority of what is known to be true about the mummification process is based on the writing of early historians who carefully recorded the processes—one of whom was Herodotus. Now, modern day archaeologists are using the writings of early historians as a basis for their study. The advancement of new technology including x-rays has allowed for the analysis of mummies without destroying the elaborate outer wrappings of the body. In addition to the use of x-rays, autopsies are also being performed in order to gain a better understanding of the diseases suffered by Ancient Egyptians as well as the treatments used for these diseases. A pregnant mummy sheds light on pregnancy complications and prenatal care and treatments. In learning their age of death, experts are able to create a timeline of the dates regarding the ruling of Egyptian kings. In looking at the bones of the mummified bodies, experts get a better idea of the average height and life span. Studying Ancient Egyptian Mummies, archaeologists are able to learn about the past.

2014 VOA report about reparation of an Egyptian mummy in the US

Chemical analysis has continually produced new insights on the composition of embalming mixtures. Ingredients for the "recipe" was not mentioned in any Egyption text, and only very fragmentarily mentioned by later Greek and Roman sources. Since the 1970s, chemists have tested the composition of mummies and bandages to figure out the various oils, waxes, and herbs used. In 2019, a 26th Dynasty embalming workshop was unearthed at Saqqara. A number of clay beakers and bowls were found inscribed with instructions for use (e.g. "to put on the head") or the name of the substances (e.g. "sefet"). A 2022 paper reports the chemical composition of their contents, noting that a number of embalming materials come from trade outside of Egypt. In 2023, similar tests were performed on 18th Dynasty canopic jar balm residues.

== Depictions in modern culture ==
- Bolesław Prus, Pharaoh (1895), depicts the whole process of mummification and funeral at the fall of the 20th Dynasty and New Kingdom.

== See also ==
- Ancient Egyptian afterlife beliefs
- Predynastic Egyptian mummies
- Egyptian mummies
- List of Egyptian mummies (royalty)

== Bibliography ==
- Allen, James P. (2000). Middle Egyptian: An introduction to the language and culture of hieroglyphs. Cambridge University Press. p. 315. ISBN 0521774837.
- David, Rosalie (2002). Religion and Magic in Ancient Egypt. Penguin. p. 93. ISBN 0140262520.
- David, Rosalie (10 May 2012). Journey through the Afterlife. Elsevier. p. 20.
- "Mummies: Death and the afterlife in ancient Egypt". Bowers Museum. The History Place. British Museum. 7 May 2012. Archived from the original on 2019-02-13.
- Hornung, Erik (1999). The Ancient Egyptian Books of the Afterlife. Translated by Lorton, David. Ithaca, NY: Cornell University Press. ISBN 0801485150.
- James, T.G.H. (2005). The British Museum Concise Introduction to Ancient Egypt. Ann Arbor, MI: University of Michigan Press. p. 122. ISBN 0-472-03137-6.
- Kamrin, Janice; Ikram, Salima (2006). "The ancient Egyptian view of the afterlife". Calliope. Vol. 17, no. 1. Englewood, NJ: Dwight-Englewood School. pp. 10–11.
- Lesko, Leonard H. (2001). "Religion and the afterlife". Calliope. Vol. 12, no. 1. Englewood, NJ: Dwight-Englewood School. pp. 4–5.
- Taylor, John (2001). Death and the Afterlife in Ancient Egypt. Chicago, IL: University of Chicago Press. pp. 187–193. ISBN 0226791645.
- Grajetzki, Wolfram (2003). Burial Customs in Ancient Egypt: Life in death for rich and poor. London, UK: Duckworth. ISBN 0-7156-3217-5.
- Roberson, Joshua Aaron (Fall 2015). "A season in hell". Expedition. Vol. 57, no. 2. Philadelphia, PA: Penn Museum. pp. 17–23.
- "The Book of the Dead was Egyptians' inside guide to the underworld". National Geographic. 2016. Archived from the original on November 7, 2019.
- Mark, Joshua J. (19 January 2013). "Ancient Egyptian burial". World History Encyclopedia.
- "The methods of embalming". Egyptian Mummies. Smithsonian Institution.
- Pruitt, Sarah (30 August 2018). "Scientists reveal inside story of ancient Egyptian animal mummies". History.
- "Egyptian animals were mummified same way as humans". National Geographic. 15 September 2004. Archived from the original on November 13, 2018.
- "Object: Egyptian funerary boat". www.bbc.co.uk. A History of the World. BBC.
- "Grave goods, mummification". Online Exhibits. spurlock.illinois.edu. Artifacts. Urbana, IL: University of Illinois, Spurlock Museum. 2020.
