= Workmen's village =

Ancient Egyptian settlement

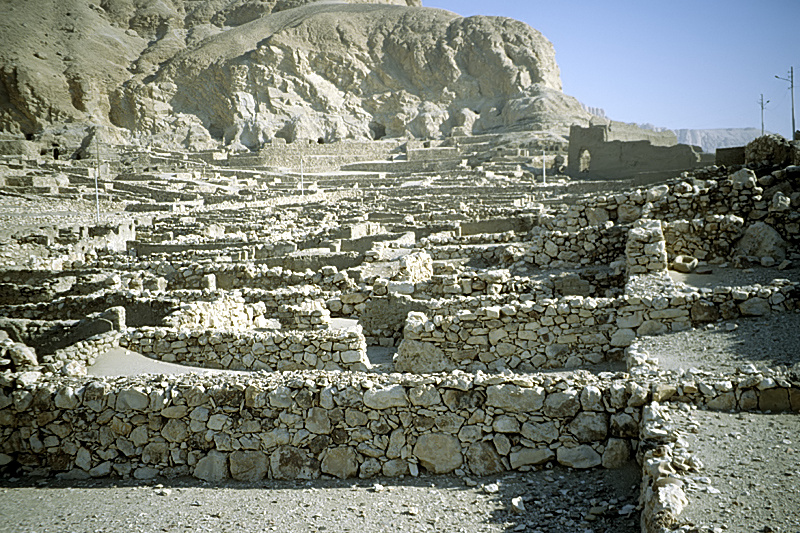
Remains of a necropolis workmen's village at Deir el-Medina

A workmen's village is a settlement of workers, foremen, scribes, architects, etc. usually located in the area of a major ancient site in Egypt, and mostly connected to the construction and decoration of tombs.

Examples include:

- Workmen's Village, Amarna – Settlement of workers for the Royal Tombs at Amarna
- Deir el-Medina (Thebes) – Settlement of workers for the Valley of the Kings, Valley of the Queens and Tombs of the Nobles
- El-Lahun – Settlement of workers for the Pyramid of Senusret II
