= Tongue Cover-Plate =

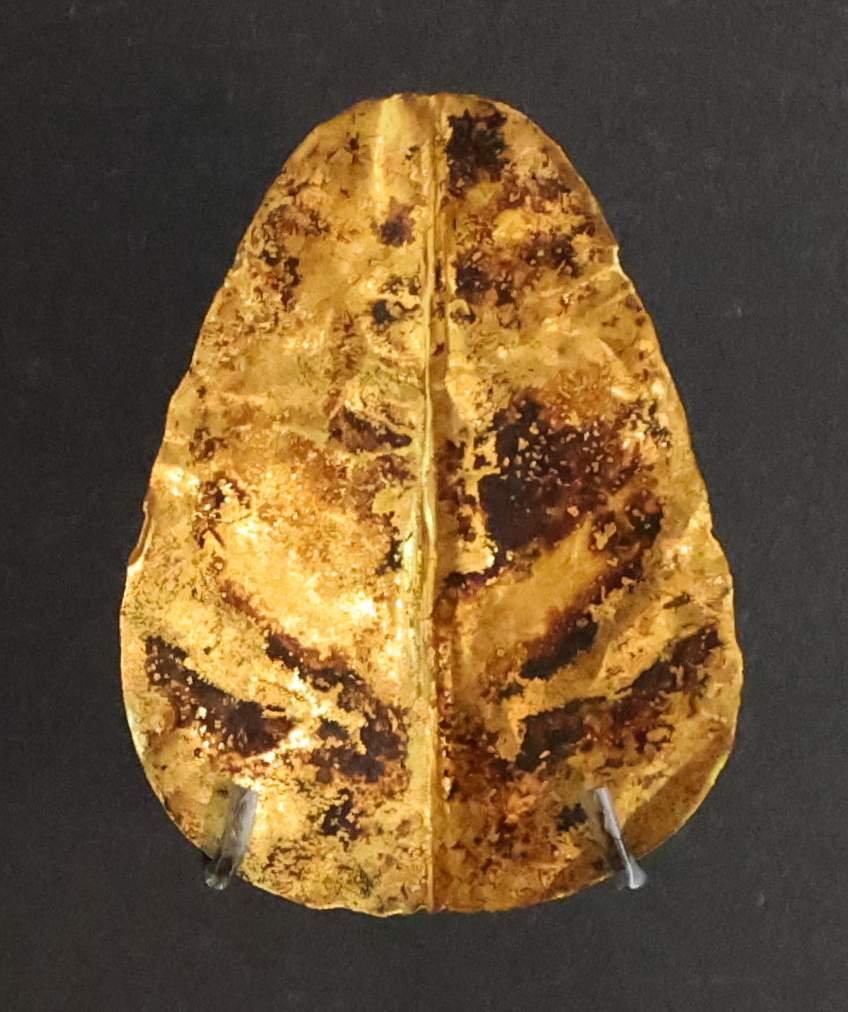
Tongue Cover-Plate from Hawara

Tongue Cover-Plates were gold foil amulets placed over the tongues of some Egyptian mummies. This mainly took place during the Greco-Roman period although examples from the Twenty-sixth Dynasty have been found at Oxyrhynchus. This funerary ritual appears to have been done in the belief that it would help the dead individual speak in the afterlife. They were sometimes accompanied by gold eye amulets.

In the 21st century examples of such amulets have been found at Oxyrhynchus, Quesna and Taposiris Magna. In the 19th century finds were made at Tell Nabasha, San el-Hagar and Hawara.
