= Kha (Egyptian) =

Ancient Egyptian foreman and official

- Chief in the Great Place; Overseer of works in the Great Place
- Wooden statuette of Kha, placed on a chair in front of his outer coffin (Suppl. 8335).
Egyptian name
N28 a Y1
- Dynasty: Eighteenth Dynasty
- Pharaoh: Amenhotep II; Thutmose IV; Amenhotep III
- Died: Reign of Amenhotep III, aged 50–60
- Burial: TT8, Deir el-Medina
- Spouse: Merit
- Children: Amenemopet, Nakhteftaneb, Merit

Kha was an ancient Egyptian foreman and official of the Eighteenth Dynasty, active at Deir el-Medina during the reigns of Amenhotep II, Thutmose IV and Amenhotep III. He is also commonly described as an architect, but his attested titles were "chief in the Great Place" and "overseer of works in the Great Place"; as foreman of the royal-necropolis crew, he directed workers engaged in the construction and decoration of royal tombs.

Kha was married to Merit, with whom he had three children, and died during the reign of Amenhotep III at an estimated age of between 50 and 60.

The burial chamber of Kha and Merit was discovered intact in 1906 by the Italian Archaeological Mission led by Ernesto Schiaparelli. Its funerary assemblage comprises more than 460 objects. The grave goods form the most abundant, complete and best-preserved non-royal Egyptian funerary collection yet discovered.

== Life and career ==
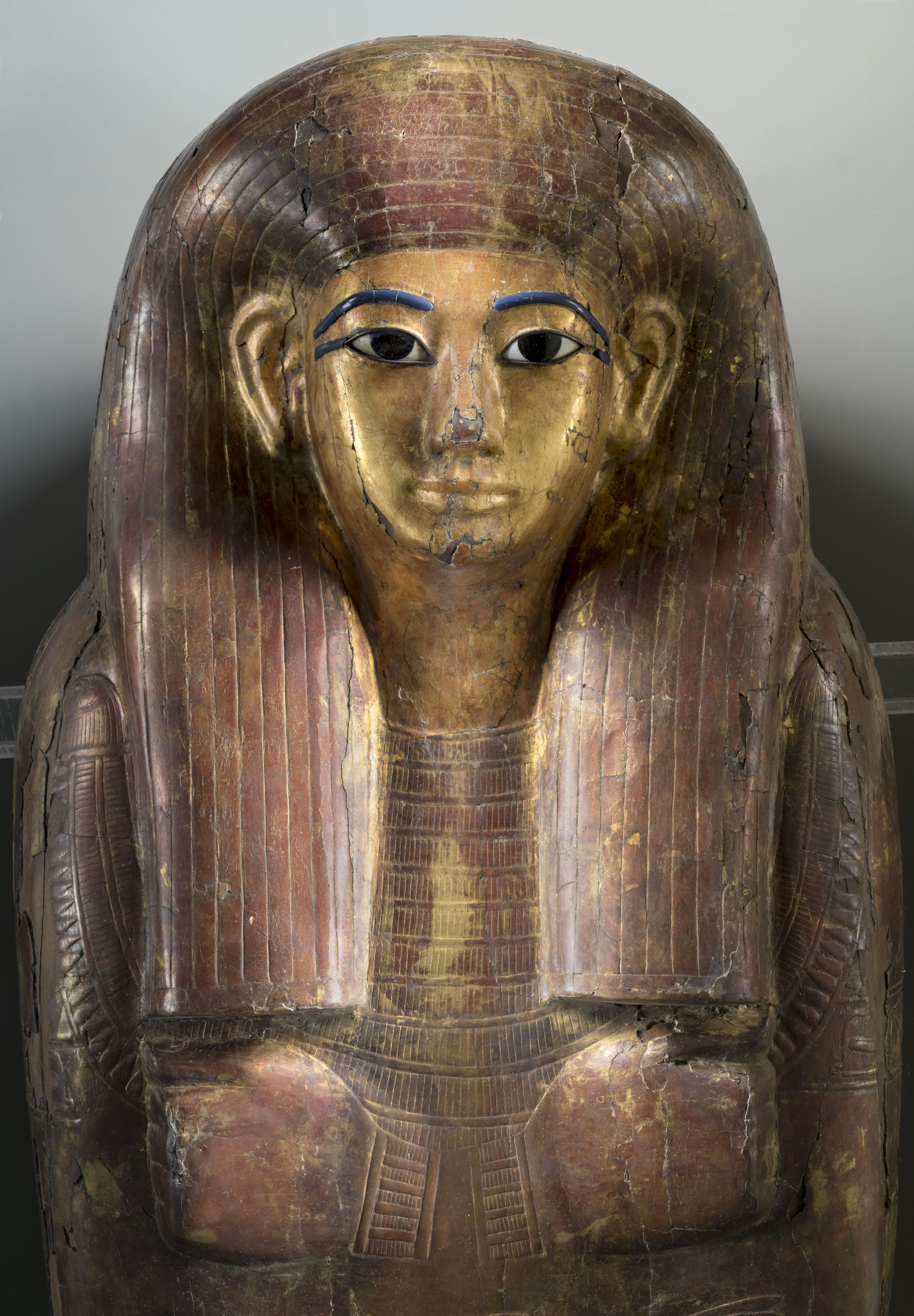
Detail of Kha's inner coffin (Suppl. 8429).

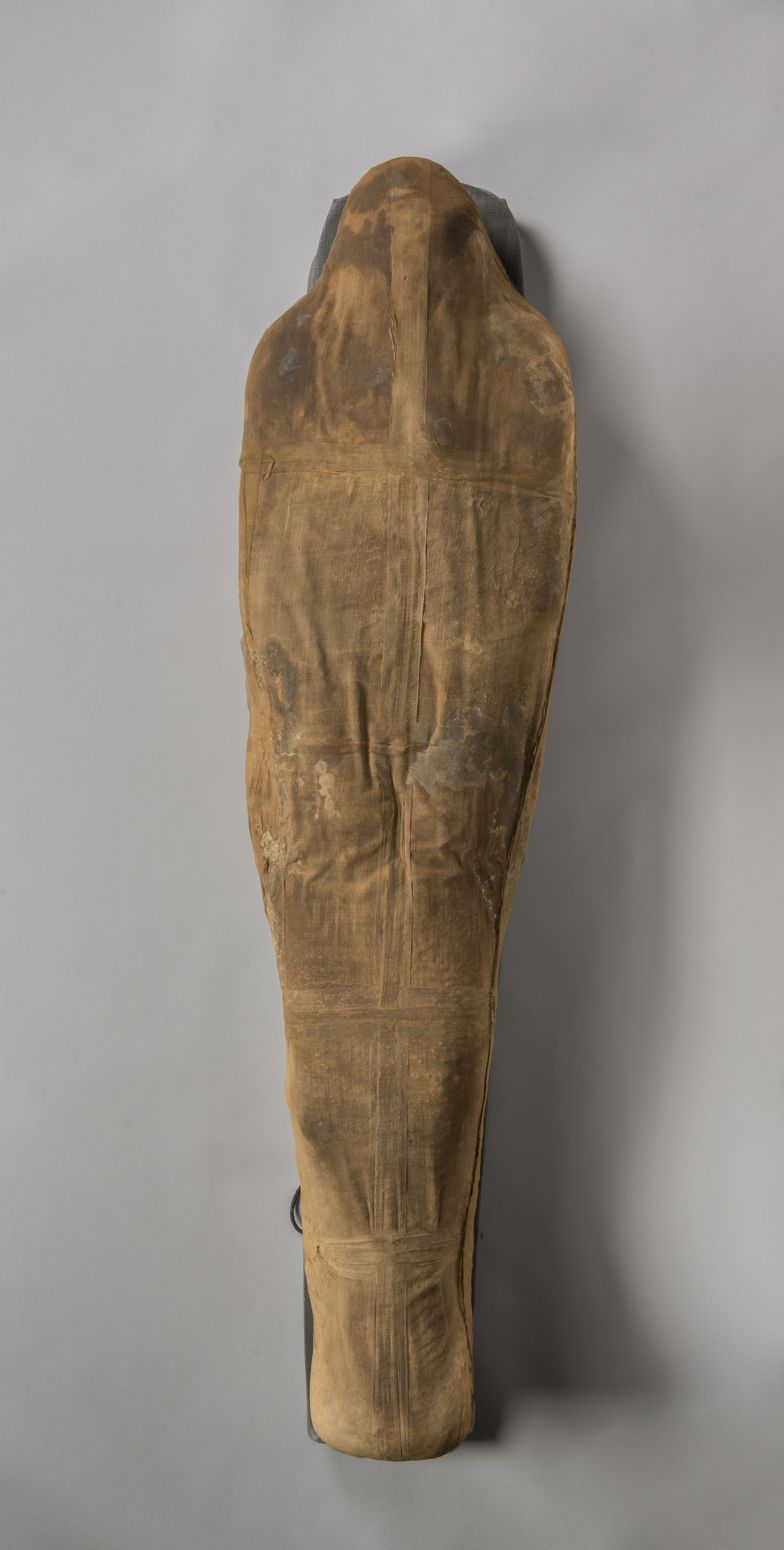
The mummy of Kha; a gold-disc shebyu collar and other jewellery remain beneath the wrappings (Suppl. 8316/02 = Suppl. 8431). Radiographic examinations revealed the skeleton, dentition and jewellery beneath the wrappings.

Kha's father is named Iuy in Kha's Book of the Dead. It has been suggested that Kha came from a modest background and rose to his position on the basis of personal merit.

Kha was active at Deir el-Medina, the settlement of the workforce employed on the royal tombs, and worked in the Valley of the Kings during the reigns of three pharaohs, Amenhotep II, Thutmose IV and Amenhotep III. His duties were primarily supervisory: he oversaw the construction of royal tombs and led the crew responsible for their construction and decoration. Surviving lists record crews of 26–30 men during the reign of Amenhotep II and about 44 during the reign of Amenhotep III; in one list Kha's personal mark appears first, probably because he was the foreman.

Kha and Neferhebef were contemporaries and held the same position in the direction of works. It has been suggested that they jointly directed the workforce, but there is no evidence that the crew was then divided into two groups, as occurred in the Ramesside period. Neferhebef and his wife Tayunes are depicted in Kha's funerary chapel, while Neferhebef's name also occurs on objects from the TT8 burial assemblage. A progression from "overseer of works in the Great Place" to "chief in the Great Place" has also been proposed, but there is no explicit evidence for such a hierarchy and the two titles may have been interchangeable. The title "royal scribe" is attested only on two decorated canes from Kha's tomb (Suppl. 8417 and 8418/01); Laboury noted that these objects may instead have been gifts from a namesake colleague who held that title, so its attribution to Kha is uncertain.

Kha and Merit had three children: Amenemopet, Nakhteftaneb and a daughter also named Merit. Amenemopet bore the title "Servant in the Royal Necropolis", while nothing is known about Nakhteftaneb's career; their sister Merit was a chantress of Amun. All three children survived their mother. Merit died before her husband. The dimensions of the anthropoid coffin in which she was buried, together with funerary texts naming Kha, suggest that it may originally have been prepared for Kha and subsequently used for Merit. Empty spaces around her body were filled with linen bearing Kha's name.

Kha died during the reign of Amenhotep III, between the ages of 50 and 60. He was buried wearing a gold-disc shebyu collar, part of the "Gold of Honour" awarded by the king to distinguished officials; other jewellery also remained beneath the wrappings.

=== Medical condition ===
His skeleton shows spondylosis, a degenerative condition of the spinal column, with osteophytes in the lumbar region; mild degenerative changes are also visible in the knees, and an enthesopathy is present at the insertion of the right triceps brachii. During life he had lost almost all of his upper premolars and molars, as well as several lower teeth, greatly reducing his ability to chew; no injuries attributable to fatal trauma were identified, and the cause of death remains unknown.

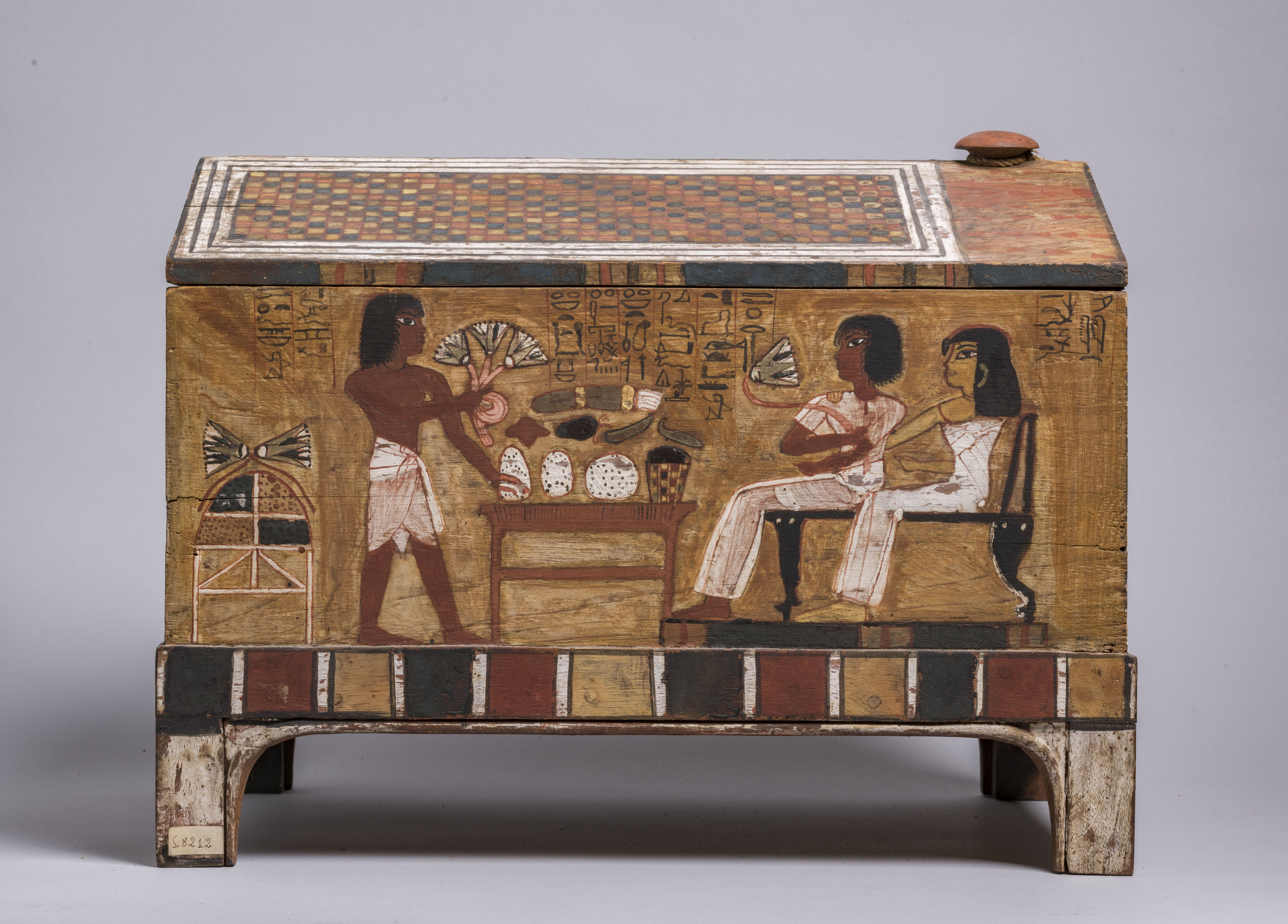
Wooden box showing Kha and Merit receiving offerings from their son Nakhttaneb (Suppl. 8212).

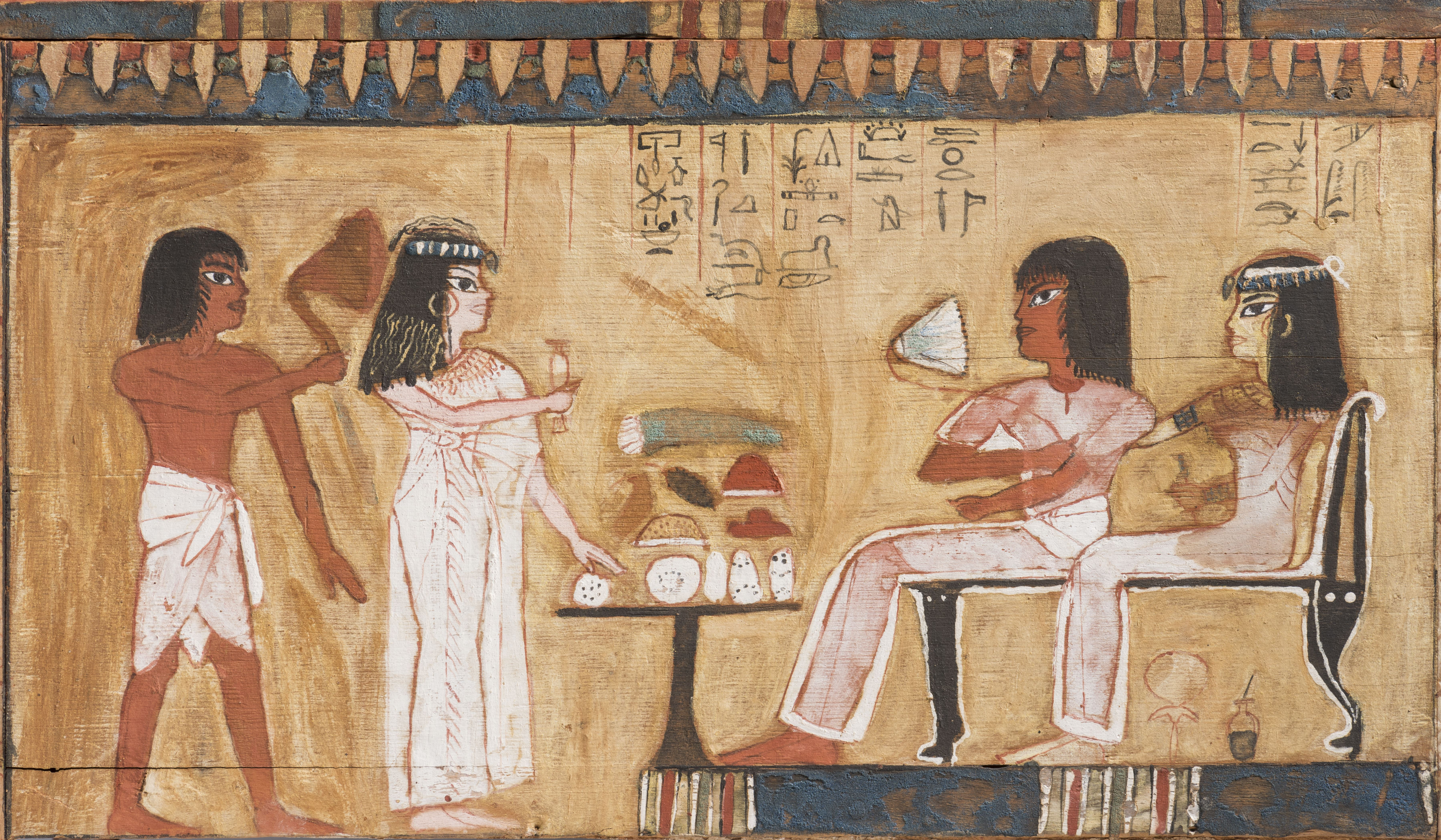
Detail of a wooden box showing Kha and Merit receiving offerings from two of their children (Suppl. 8613).

== Titles and office ==
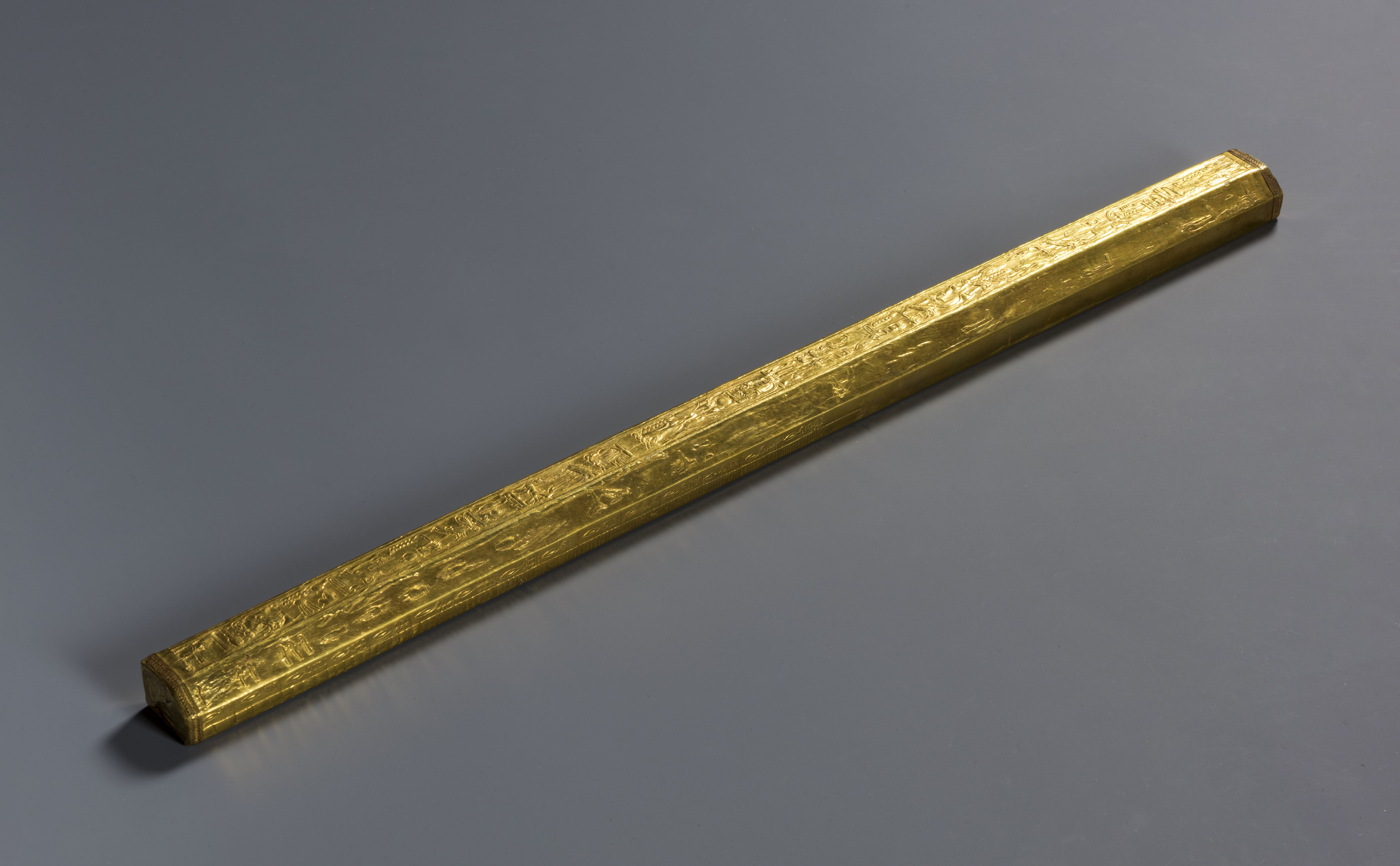
Royal cubit rod of wood covered with gold leaf, inscribed with the name of Amenhotep II (Suppl. 8647).

Kha is described in inscriptions as "chief in the Great Place" (Egyptian: Hry (m) st aAt) and "overseer of works in the Great Place" (Egyptian: mr kAt st aAt); the "Great Place" referred to the royal necropolis. The first title appears on a wooden statuette, while the second occurs on most objects from his funerary equipment. On a bronze basin (Suppl. 8225), a dedication to his vital essence (Egyptian: ka) calls him "overseer of works". The gilded royal cubit rod bearing the name of Amenhotep II (Suppl. 8647) was a token of the king's appreciation for Kha. Neferhebef and Khaemwaset, who also bore the title "director of works", gave Kha two inscribed canes that served as signs of authority.

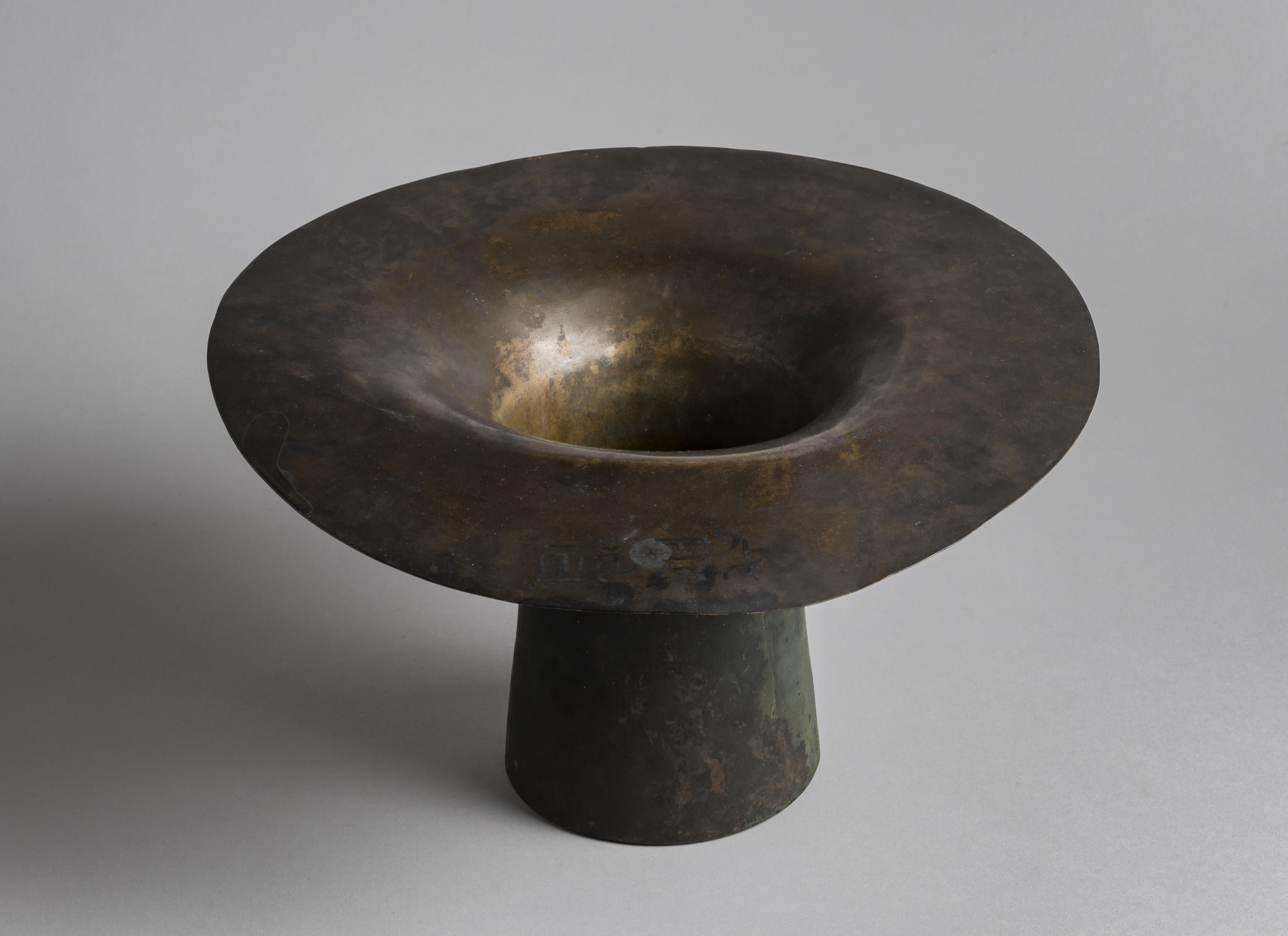
Bronze basin with a painted dedication to the ka of the overseer of works Kha (Suppl. 8225).

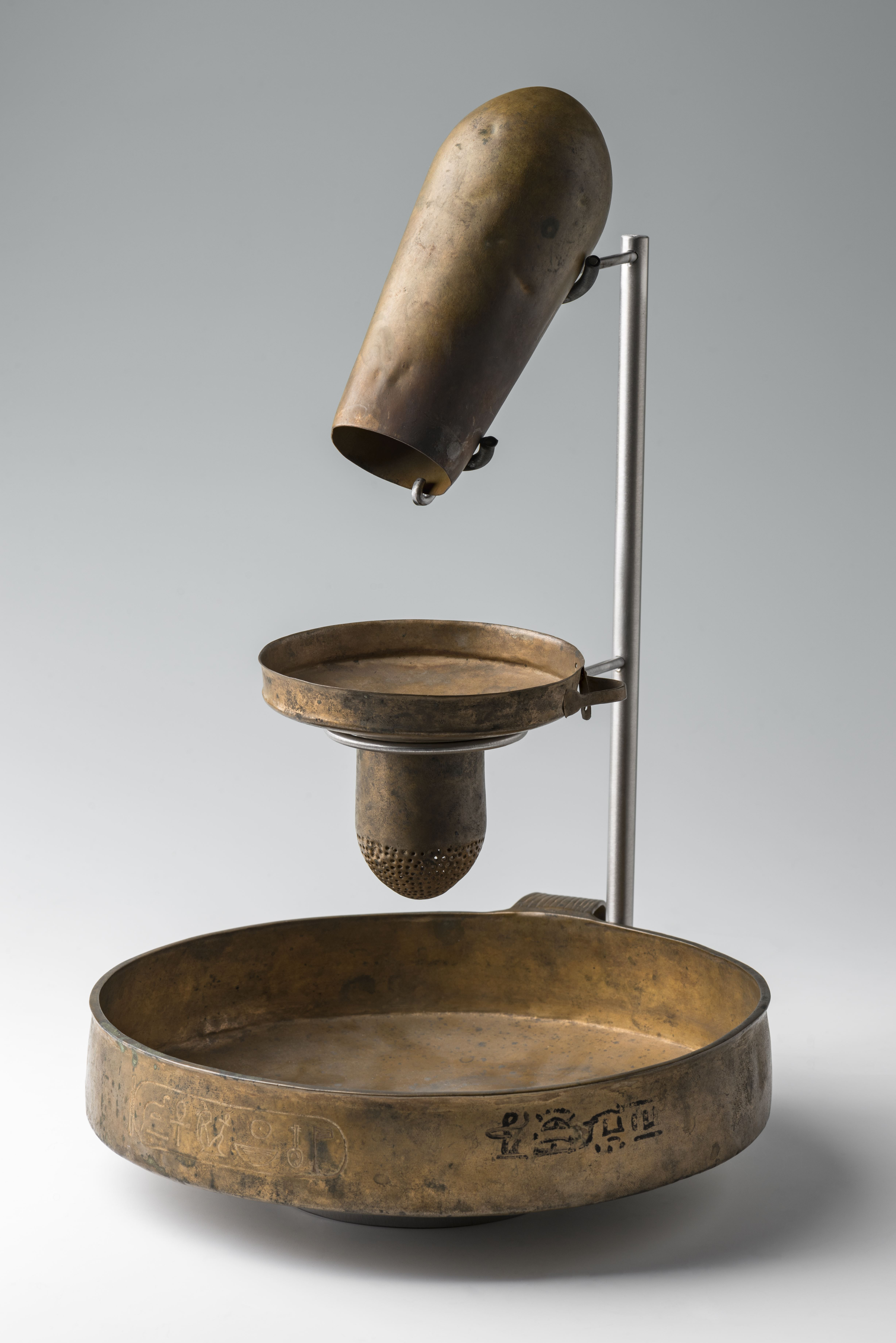
Bronze bowl with an incised cartouche of Amenhotep III and a painted dedication to Kha's ka (Suppl. 8355), strainer (Suppl. 8393) and bronze situla without handle (Suppl. 8244).

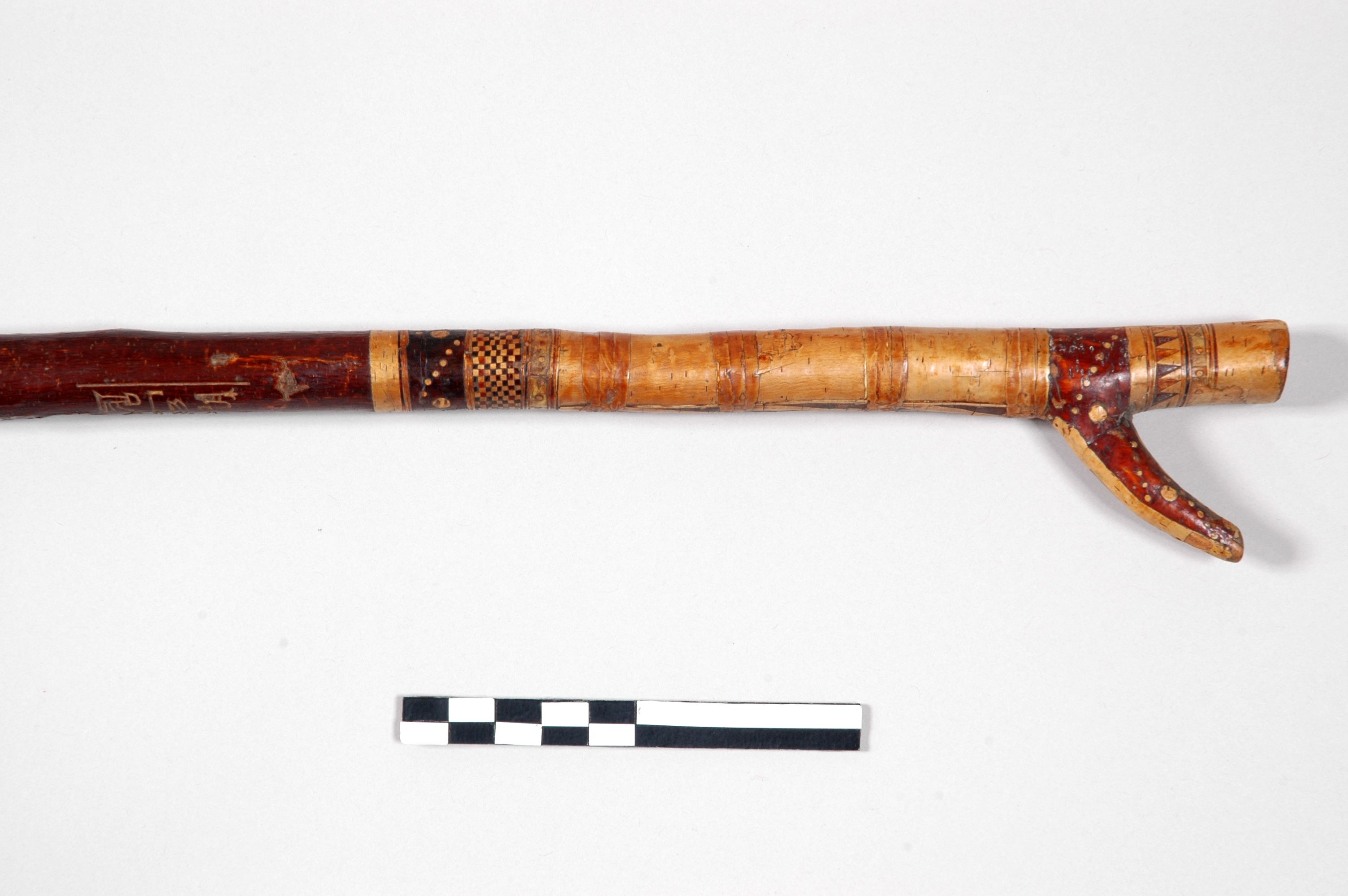
Detail of a cane with a bronze tip and inlaid handle, inscribed with Kha's name (Suppl. 8417).

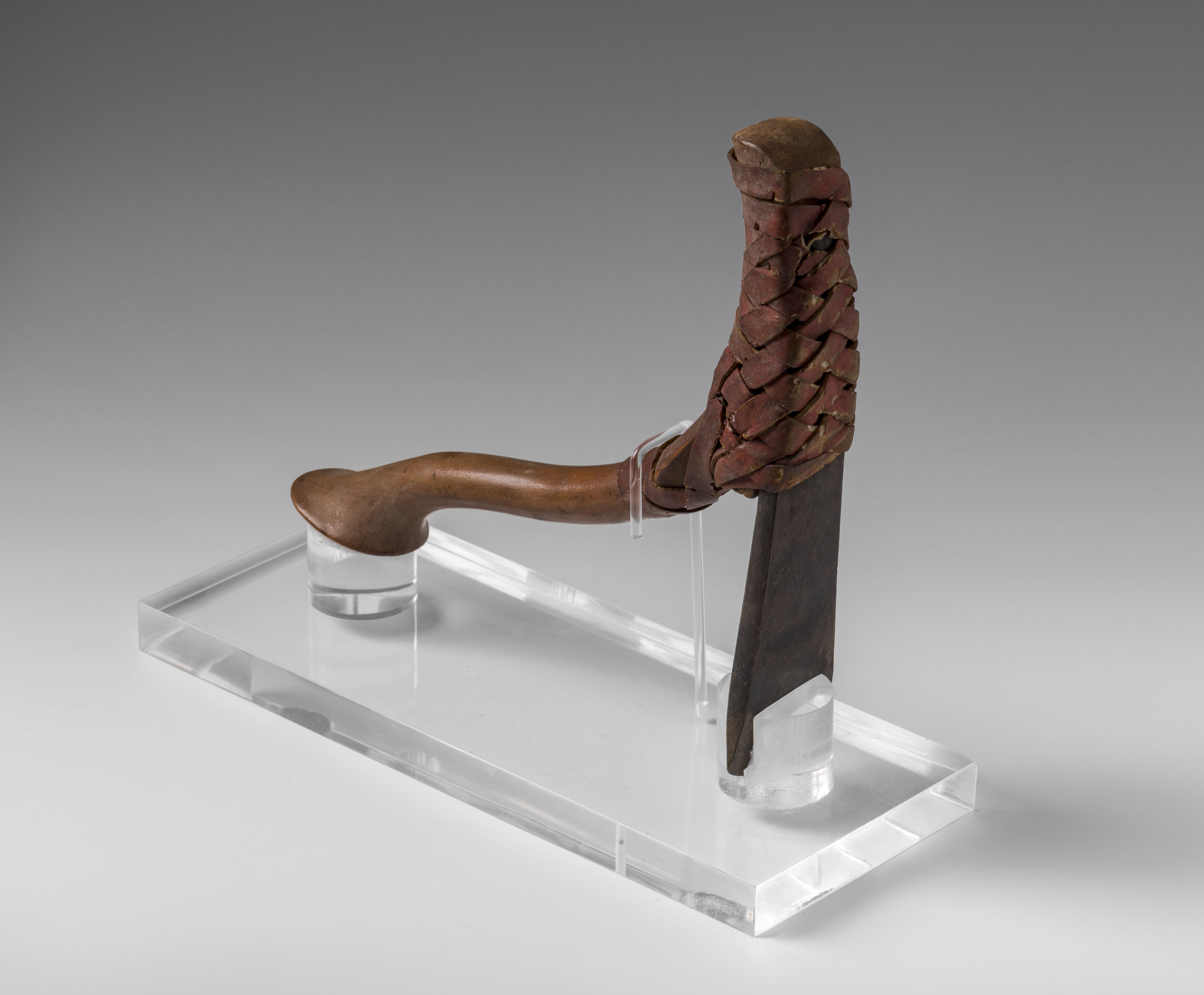
Axe of wood, leather and bronze, with Kha's monogram incised on the upper face of the blade (Suppl. 8386).

== Tomb ==
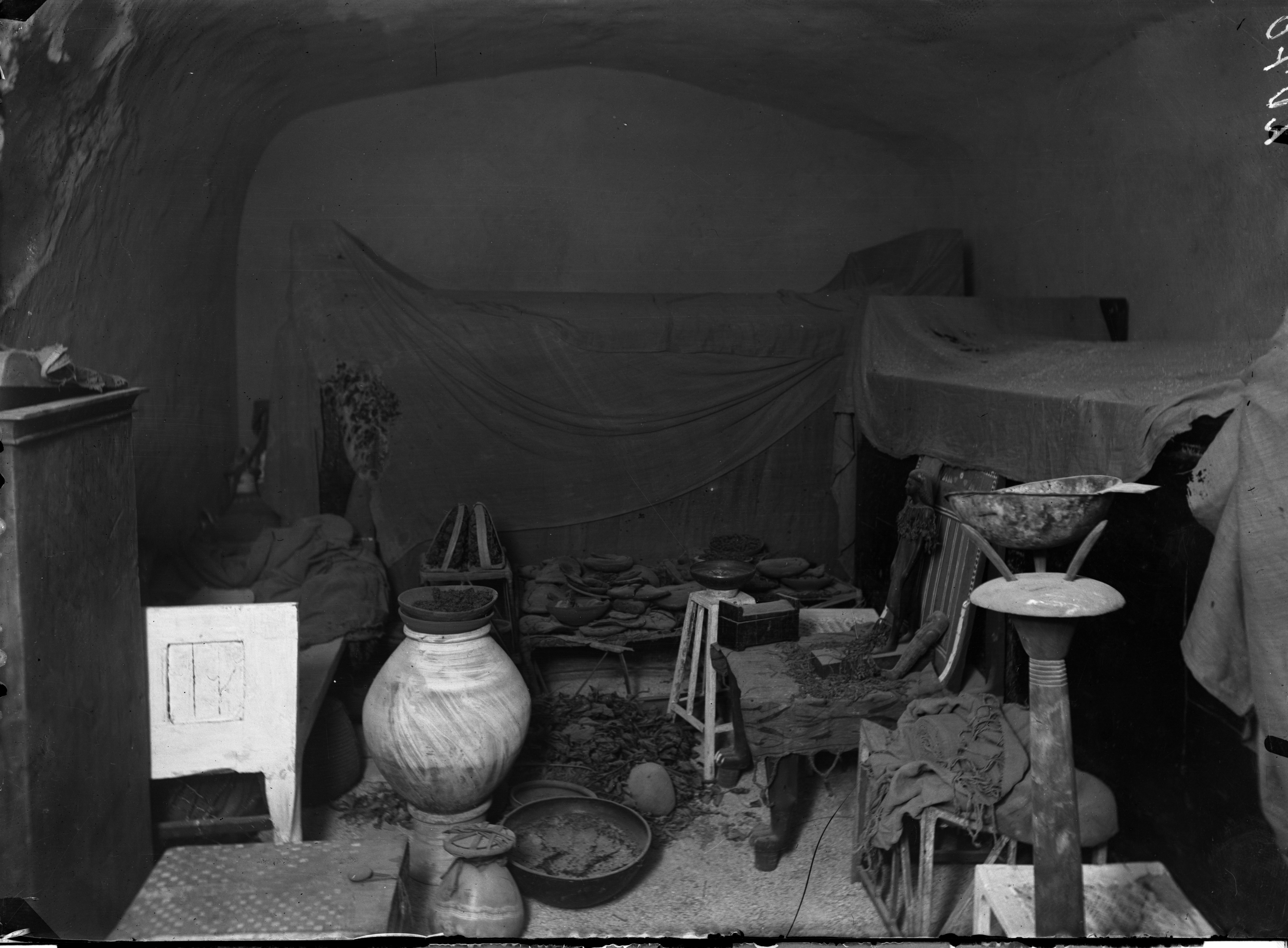
The burial chamber at the time of its discovery, photographed by Francesco Ballerini in 1906 (C02070).

The burial chamber of Kha and Merit (TT8) was discovered on 15 February 1906 by the Italian Archaeological Mission led by Ernesto Schiaparelli, about 25 m north of the family chapel. A landslide had sealed the entrance in antiquity, protecting the chamber from looting; its funerary assemblage comprises more than 460 objects. It forms the most abundant, complete and best-preserved collection of non-royal Egyptian grave goods yet discovered. In terms of wealth, the tomb is considered the richest non-royal burial of the New Kingdom, second only to that of Tutankhamun.

Kha's body lay within three nested coffins. The outer coffin was shrine-shaped and enclosed two anthropoid coffins, modelled on the human form; the middle coffin had elements covered with stucco and gold leaf, while the inner coffin was fully gilded. Almost all of the grave goods were transferred after the excavation to the Museo Egizio in Turin; a small group remained at the Egyptian Museum in Cairo.

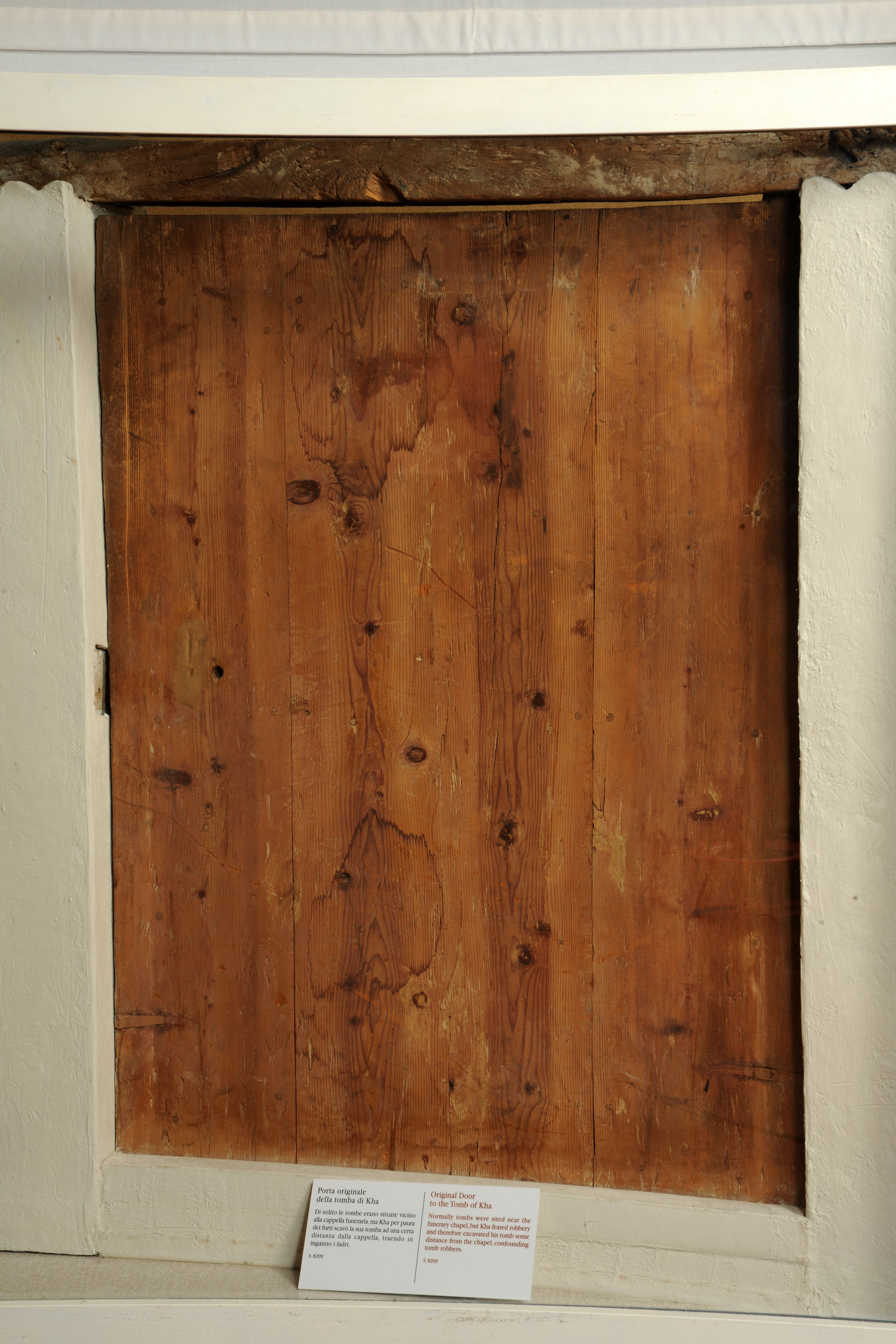
Original door to the burial chamber, made of wood with bronze fittings (Suppl. 8209).

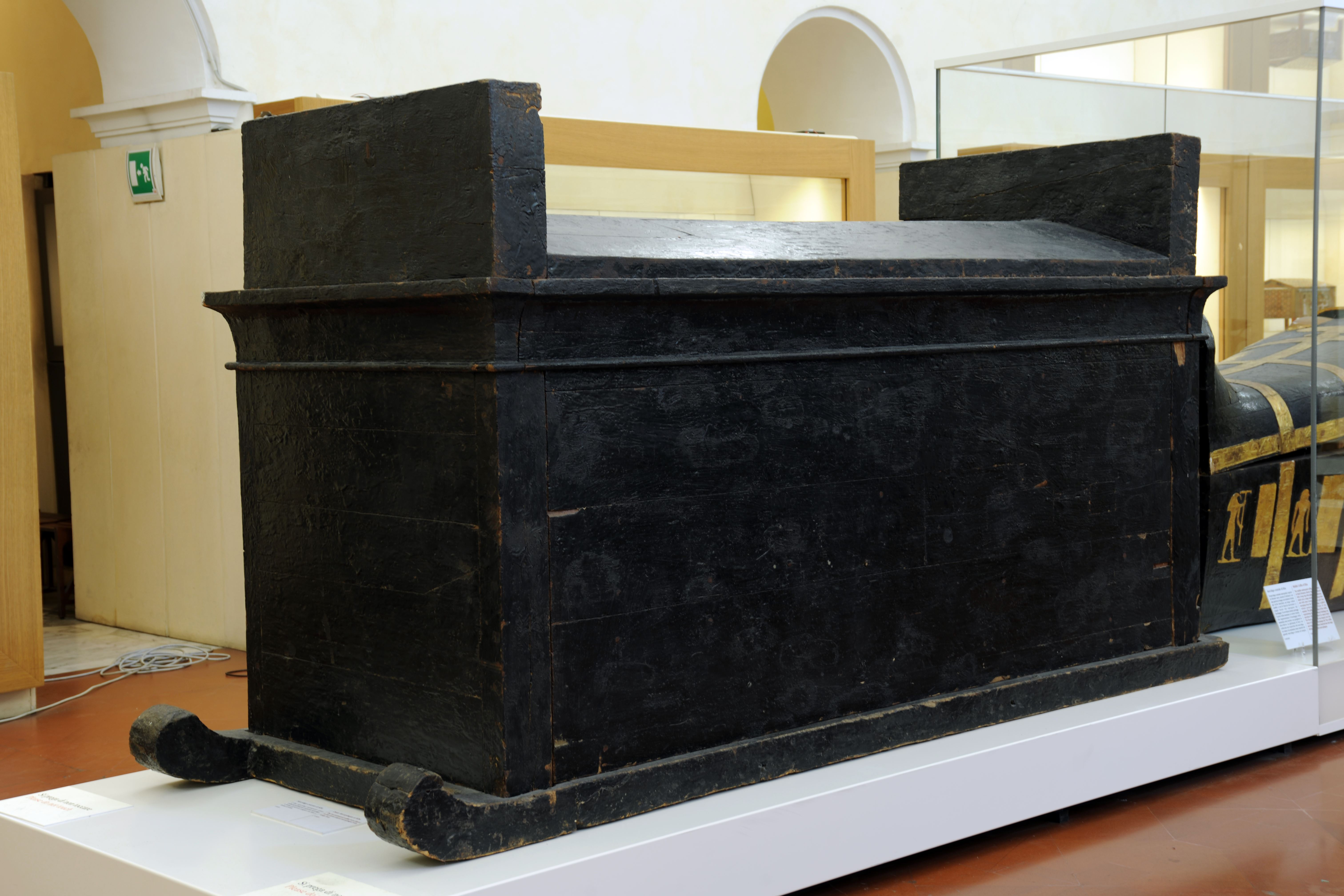
Outer coffin of Kha, made of sycamore fig wood coated with dark resin and shaped like a shrine (Suppl. 8210).

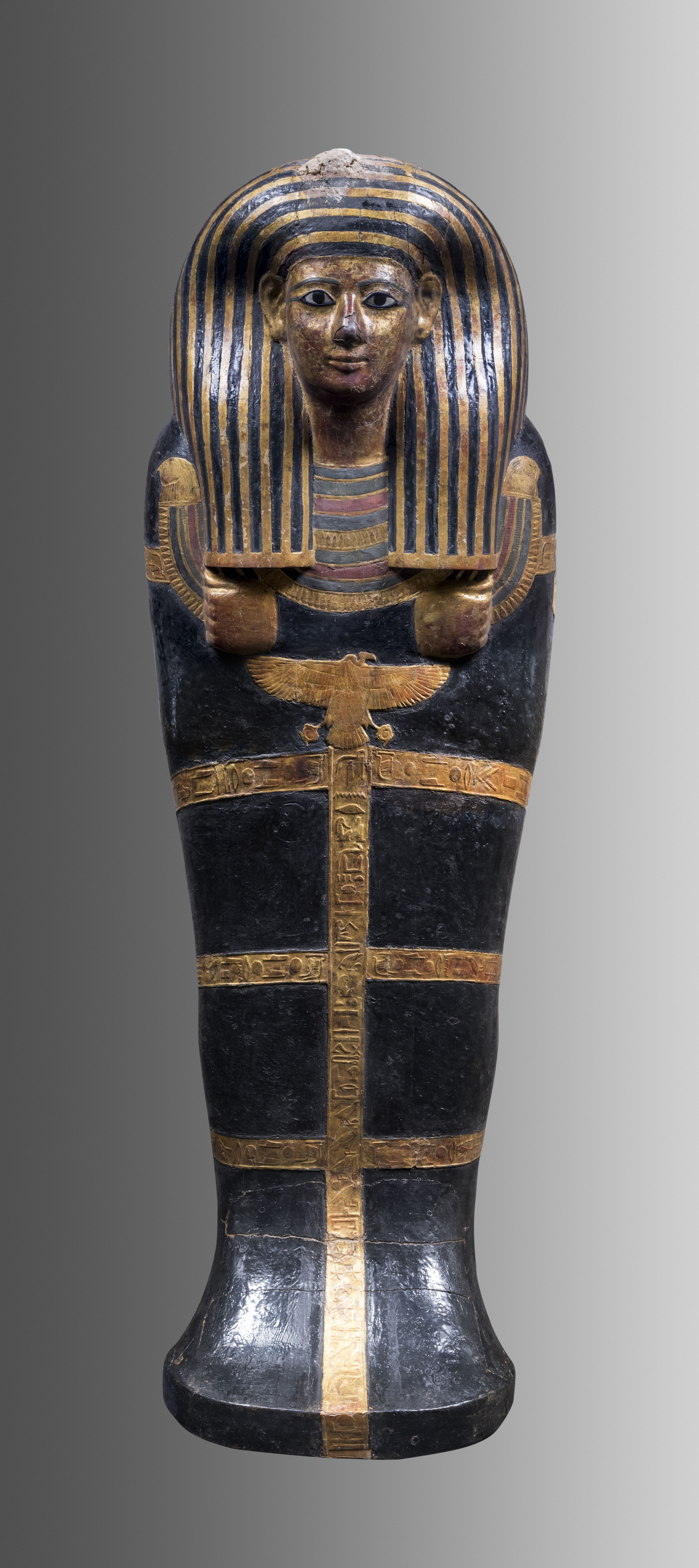
Middle coffin of Kha, with raised elements covered in stucco and gold leaf (Suppl. 8316/01).

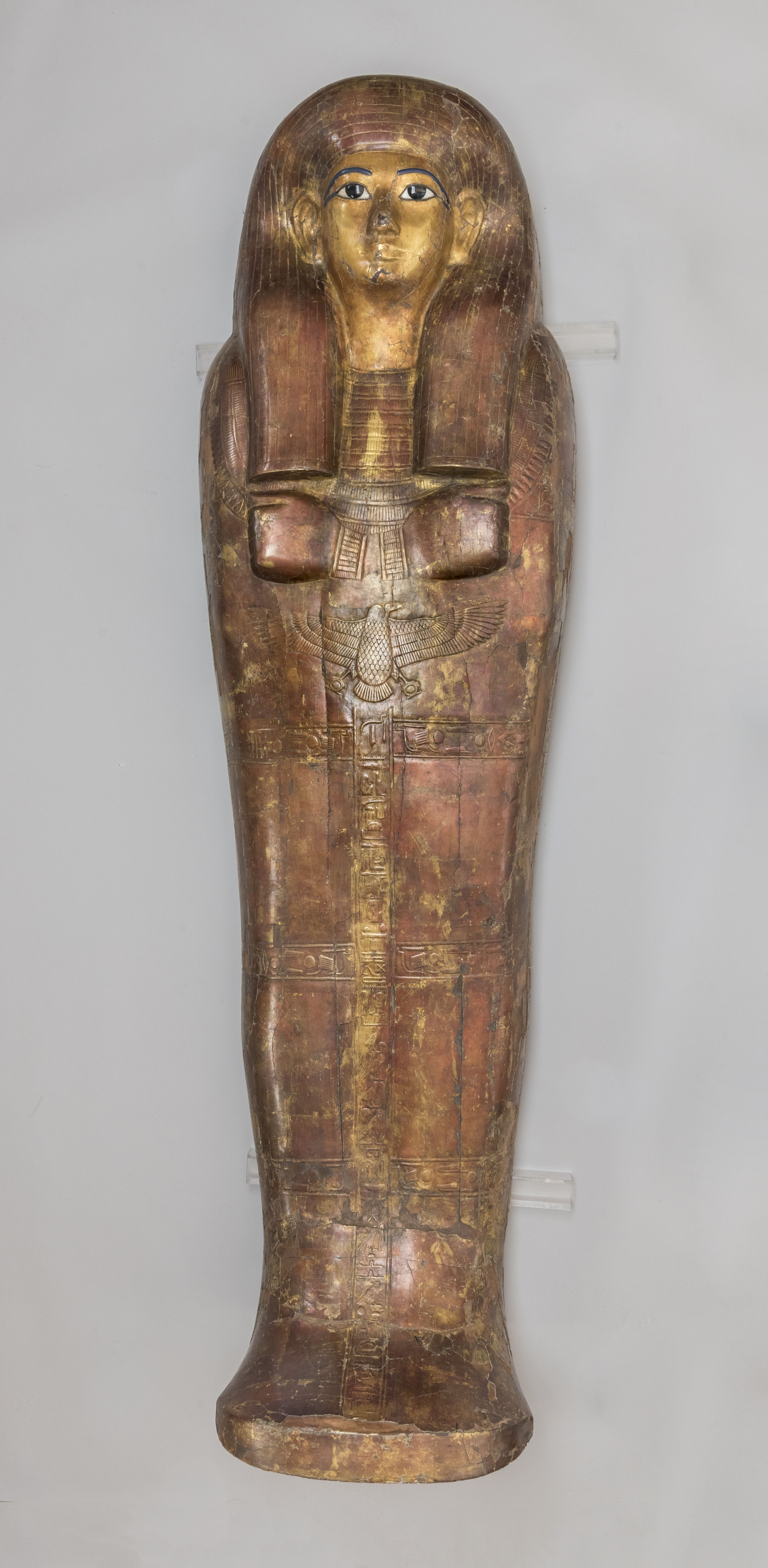
Inner coffin of Kha, its surface covered with gold leaf (Suppl. 8429).

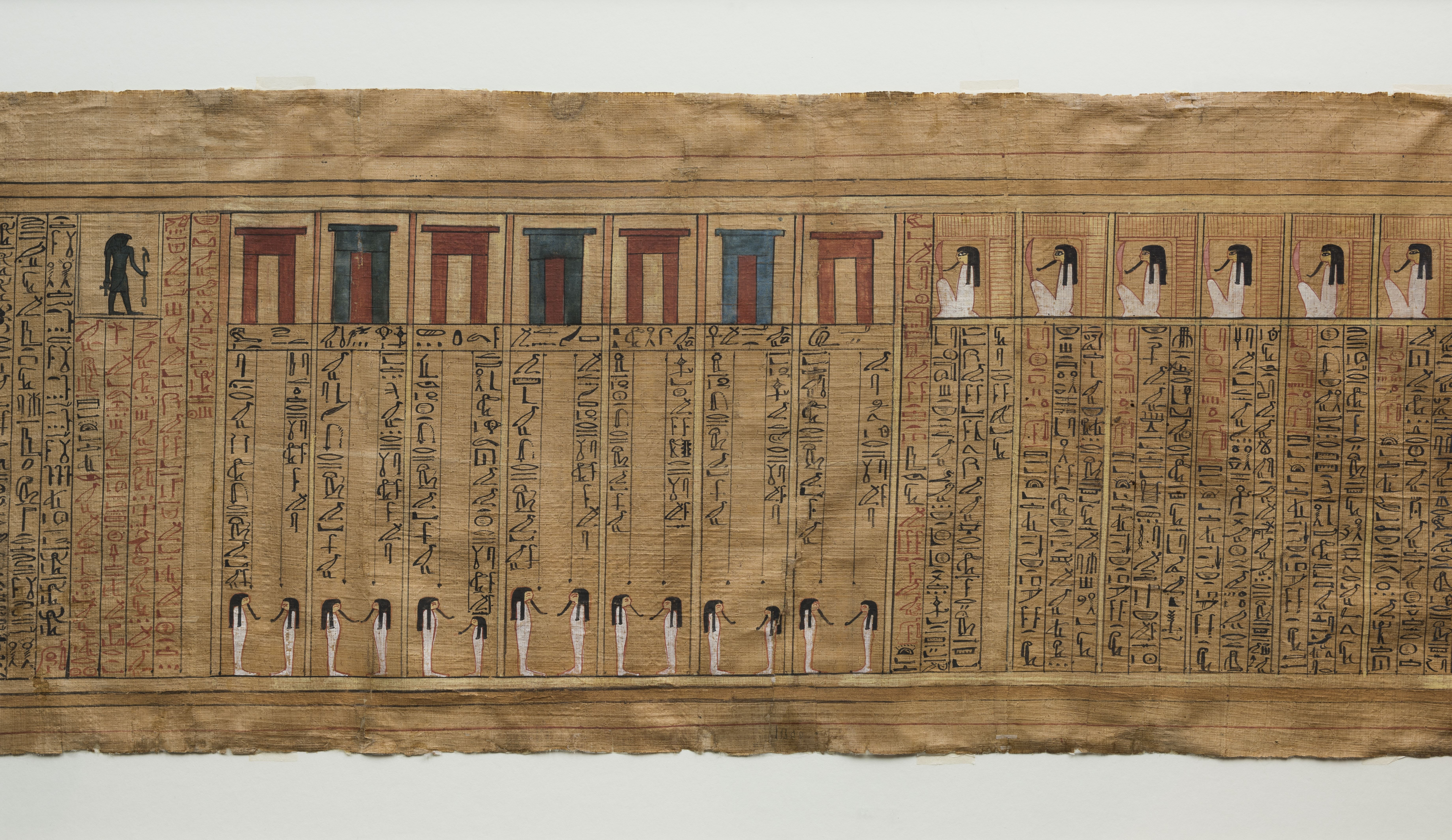
Detail of the Book of the Dead of Kha, a papyrus scroll 13.8 m long (Suppl. 8316/03 = Suppl. 8438).

== Other evidence ==
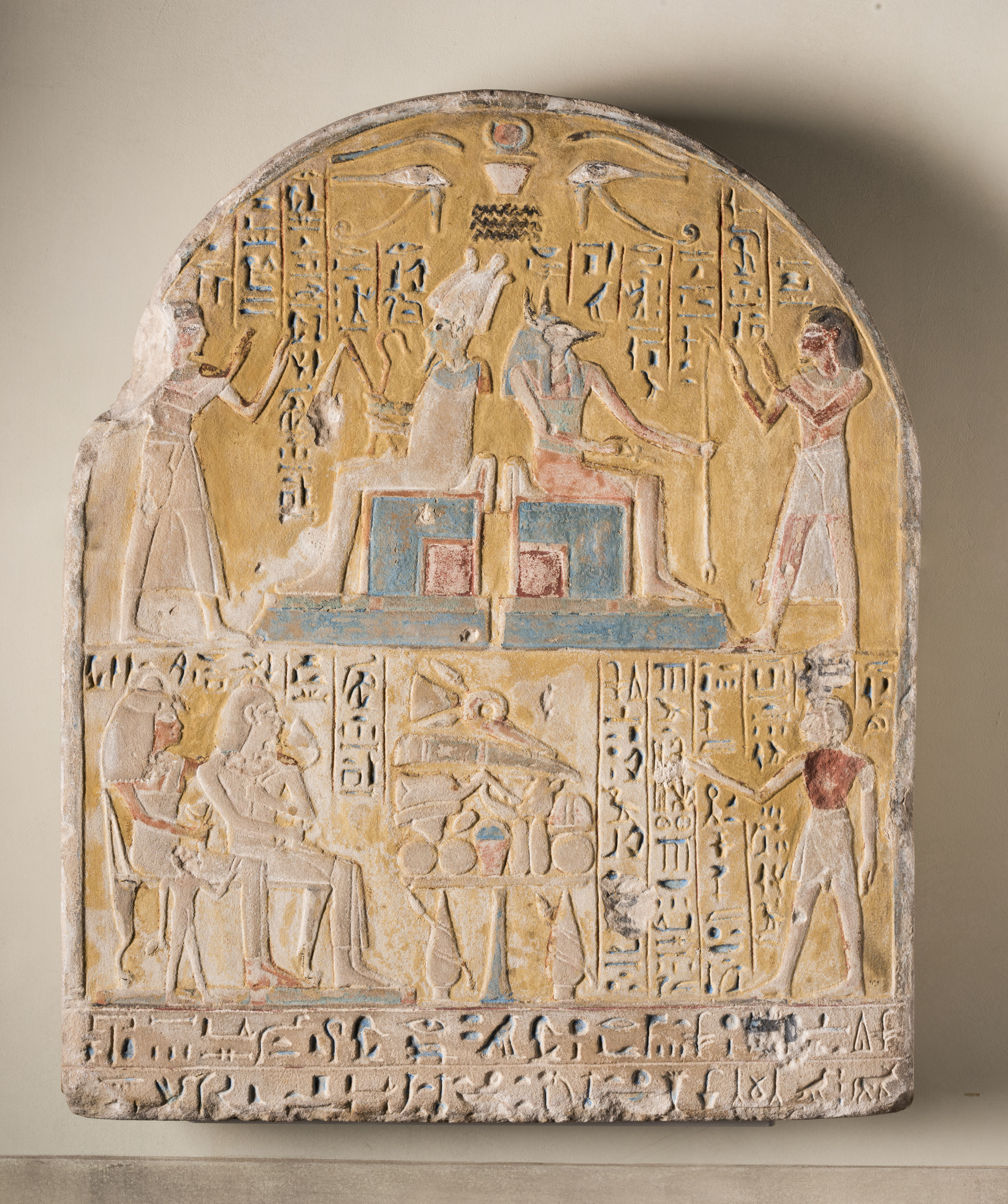
Funerary stela of sandstone from the family chapel, acquired by the Museo Egizio in Turin with the Drovetti collection in 1824 (Cat. 1618).

A funerary stele from the chapel of Kha and Merit (Cat. 1618) entered the collections of the Museo Egizio in Turin in 1824 through the purchase of the collection of Bernardino Drovetti.

A limestone stele in the British Museum (EA1515) has been associated with Kha, but its attribution is disputed. The upper register depicts Thutmose IV offering flowers and incense to Amun-Ra and the deified Ahmose-Nefertari, while a man named Kha kneels in adoration below. The British Museum currently identifies this Kha as the foreman (Inher)kha, or Inherkhau, associated with TT299. Marianne Eaton-Krauss proposed that the stela had originally been commissioned for the Eighteenth-Dynasty Kha of TT8 and was later restored and adapted for Inherkhau.

Soliman identifies Kha's personal mark on five inscribed sherds (ostraca). Two of them, ONL 6330 and ONL 6369, were found at Deir el-Medina and appear to be "name stones"; Soliman cautions, however, that it is not certain whether these two pieces refer to Kha himself or to a member of his family.

The Louvre holds a sandstone pyramidion bearing Kha's name (E 13988), with Kha shown kneeling in worship on each of its four faces. The object, originally from Kha's funerary chapel (TT8), was discovered on 8 February 1923 in the courtyard of TT326, associated with Pashedu, by the French archaeological mission led by Bernard Bruyère.

The Bibliothèque nationale de France holds the Book of the Dead of Merit (inv. 53.2), a funerary papyrus 197 cm long donated by the Duke of Luynes in 1862; its precise findspot is unknown, though Deir el-Medina has been proposed. The papyrus is attributed to Merit because her name occurs more often and precedes Kha's, although it may originally have been prepared for Kha.

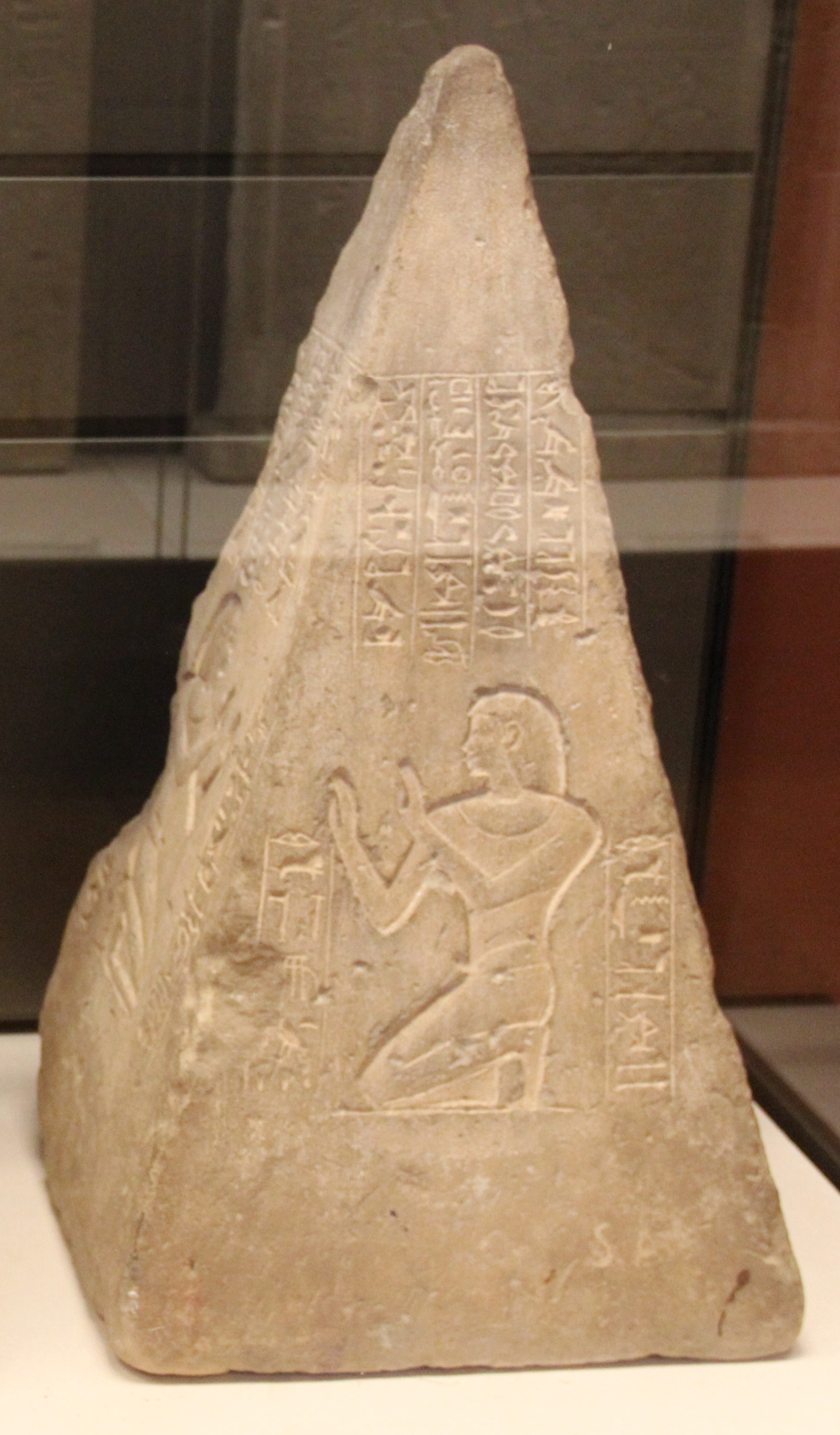
Sandstone pyramidion bearing Kha's name, with a worship scene on each face, Louvre (E 13988).

== Bibliography ==
=== Sources ===
- Bianucci, Raffaella; Habicht, Michael E.; Buckley, Stephen; Fletcher, Joann; Seiler, Roger; Öhrström, Lena M.; Vassilika, Eleni; Böni, Thomas; Rühli, Frank J. (2015). "Shedding New Light on the 18th Dynasty Mummies of the Royal Architect Kha and His Spouse Merit". PLOS ONE. 10 (7): 1–12. doi:10.1371/journal.pone.0131916. ISSN 1932-6203. PMC 4511739.
- Eaton-Krauss, Marianne (1999). "The Fate of Sennefer and Senetnay at Karnak Temple and in the Valley of the Kings". The Journal of Egyptian Archaeology. 85: 113–129. doi:10.1177/030751339908500108.
- Girardi, Alessandro (2024). "A Votive Gift for the God Amun: The Stelophorous Statue of Neferhebef (Turin Cat. 3025)". Rivista del Museo Egizio. 8: 62–87. doi:10.29353/rime.2024.5828.
- La Nasa, Jacopo; Degano, Ilaria; Modugno, Francesca; Guerrini, Camilla; Facchetti, Federica; Turina, Valentina; Carretta, Andrea; Greco, Christian; Ferraris, Enrico; Colombini, Maria Perla; Ribechini, Erika (2022). "Archaeology of the invisible: The scent of Kha and Merit". Journal of Archaeological Science. 141: 1–12. doi:10.1016/j.jas.2022.105577. hdl:11568/1133170. ISSN 0305-4403.
- Laboury, Dimitri (2023). "On the alleged involvement of Deir el-Medina crew in the making of elite tombs in the Theban Necropolis during the 18th dynasty. A reassessment". In Bryan, Betsy M.; Dorman, Peter F. (eds.). Mural Decoration in the Theban Necropolis: Occasional Proceedings of the Theban Workshop. Chicago: Institute for the Study of Ancient Cultures of the University of Chicago. pp. 115–137.
- Soliman, Daniel (2019). "Ostraca with Identity Marks and the Organisation of the Royal Necropolis Workmen of the 18th Dynasty". Bulletin de l'Institut français d'archéologie orientale. 118: 465–524. ISSN 0255-0962.
- Trapani, Marcella (2010). "El ajuar funerario de Kha en el Museo Egipcio de Turín" (PDF). Boletín del Museo Arqueológico Nacional (in Spanish). 27–28: 5–20. ISSN 2341-3409.
- Töpfer, Susanne (2019). Il Libro dei Morti di Kha. Storia e segreti di un papiro spettacolare (in Italian). Modena: Franco Cosimo Panini. ISBN 9788857015095.

=== Further reading ===
- Andreani, Carla; Aliotta, Francesco; Arcidiacono, Laura; Borla, Matilde; Di Martino, Daniela; Facchetti, Federica; Ferraris, Enrico; Festa, Giulia; Gorini, Giuseppe; Kockelmann, Winfried; Kelleher, Joe; Malfitana, Daniele; Micieli, David; Minniti, Triestino; Perelli Cippo, Elena; Ponterio, Rosaria; Salvato, Giuseppe; Senesi, Roberto; Turina, Valentina; Vasi, Claudio; Greco, Christian (2017). "A neutron study of sealed pottery from the grave-goods of Kha and Merit". Journal of Analytical Atomic Spectrometry. 32 (7): 1342–1347. doi:10.1039/C7JA00099E.
- Ferraris, Enrico (2018). La tomba di Kha e Merit (in Italian). Modena: Franco Cosimo Panini. ISBN 9788857014388.
- Festa, Giulia; Christiansen, Thomas; Turina, Valentina; Borla, Matilde; Kelleher, Joe; Arcidiacono, Laura; Cartechini, Laura; Ponterio, Rosaria C.; Scatigno, Carla; Senesi, Roberto; Andreani, Carla (2019). "Egyptian metallic inks on textiles from the 15th century BCE unravelled by non-invasive techniques and chemometric analysis". Scientific Reports. 9. doi:10.1038/s41598-019-43655-z. ISSN 2045-2322. PMC 6513853.
- Hobson, Christine (1987). Exploring the World of the Pharaohs. London: Thames & Hudson. ISBN 0500050465.
- Sartori, Marina (2022). "Talking images: A semiotic and visual analysis of three Eighteenth-Dynasty chapels in Deir el-Medina (TT8, TT340, TT354)". Deir el-Medina Through the Kaleidoscope: Proceedings of the International Workshop, Turin 8th–10th October 2018. pp. 651–676.
- Schiaparelli, Ernesto (1927). Relazione sui lavori della Missione Archeologica Italiana in Egitto (anni 1903-1920). Volume secondo: La tomba intatta dell'architetto "Cha" nella necropoli di Tebe (in Italian). Turin: Casa Editrice Giovanni Chiantore. doi:10.11588/diglit.55349.
- Vandier d'Abbadie, Jeanne; Jourdain, Geneviève (1939). Deux tombes de Deir el-Médineh. 1. La Chapelle de Khâ. 2. La tombe du scribe royal Amenemopet. Mémoires publiés par les membres de l'Institut français d'archéologie orientale (in French). Vol. 73. Cairo: Institut français d'archéologie orientale.
