= Qurna Queen =

Ancient Egyptian mummy

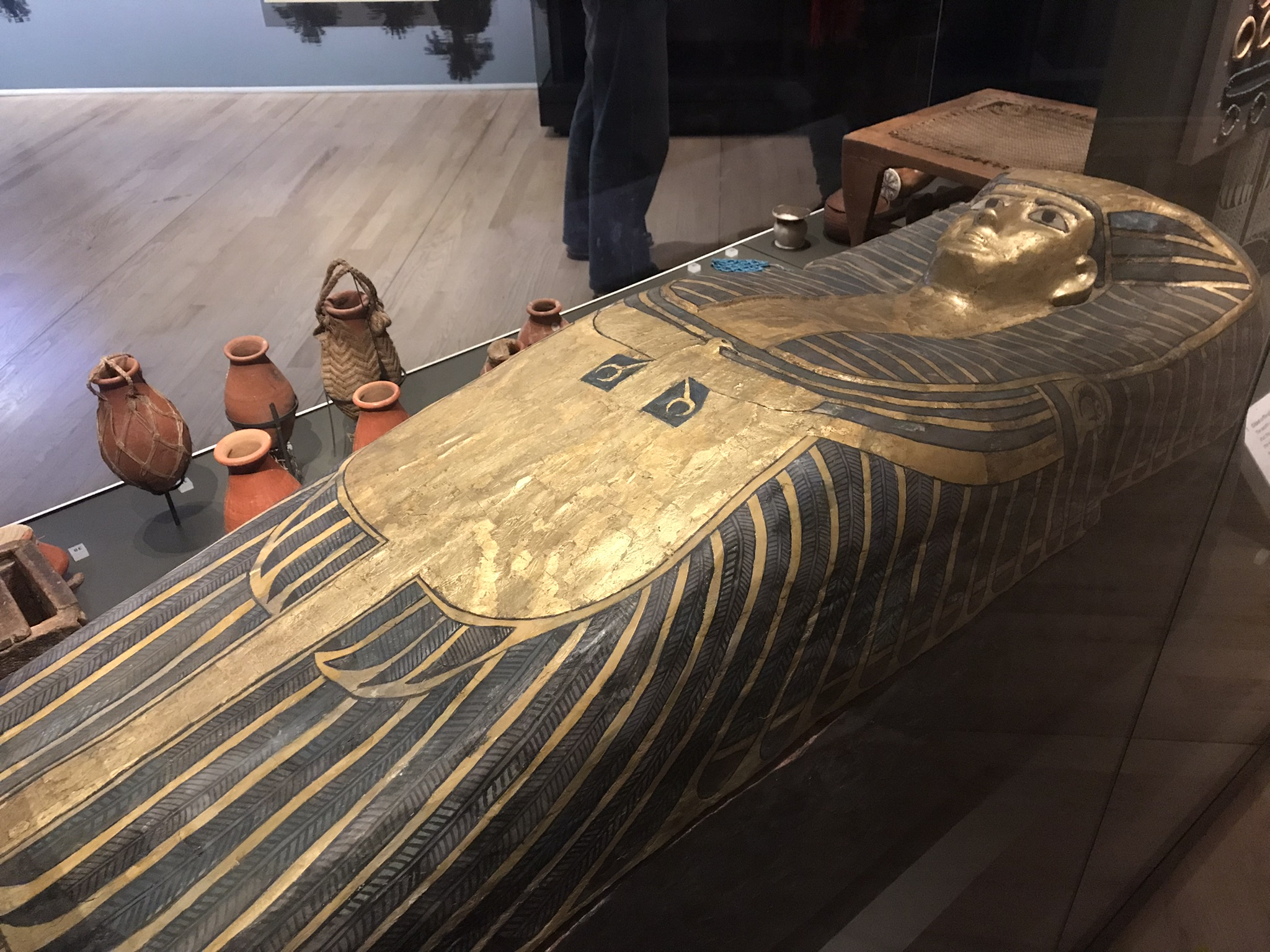
Coffin of the Qurna Queen

The Qurna Queen was an ancient Egyptian woman who lived in the Seventeenth Dynasty of Egypt, around 1600 BC to 1500 BC, whose mummy is now in the National Museum of Scotland. She was in her late teens or early twenties at the time of her death, and her mummy and coffin were found in El-Kohr, near the Valley of the Kings. Damage to her coffin (probably caused by another coffin being placed on top of it) means that her name has been lost. The quality of the grave goods and the location of the burial have been used to argue that the inhabitant of the grave was a member of the royal family. If this is the case, it would mean that the site's mummies, coffins and grave goods would make up the only complete royal burial exported from Egypt in its entirety.

== Mummy ==
The Qurna Queen was about 150 cm (59 in) 4' 11" tall and died in her late teens or early twenties. She lived during the Seventeenth Dynasty of Egypt. Examination of nitrogen ratios in her skeleton suggest a mixed Nubian and Egyptian diet. It is unclear if this because she was born and spent her childhood in Nubia or because she ate a large amount of Nubian food while living in Egypt. Pottery from the Kingdom of Kush among her grave goods is further evidence of links to the area.

She was found wearing gold earrings, gold bracelets and a gold ring collar. She also had a girdle of electrum rings. The collar is in the form of an early Shebyu collar with a 38cm outer circumference.

The mummification process failed to preserve any soft tissue and only the woman's skeleton remains. Her coffin was rishi style with a sycamore-fig lower half and a tamarisk lid. The lid is painted blue and yellow with gilded highlights.

== Discovery and aftermath ==
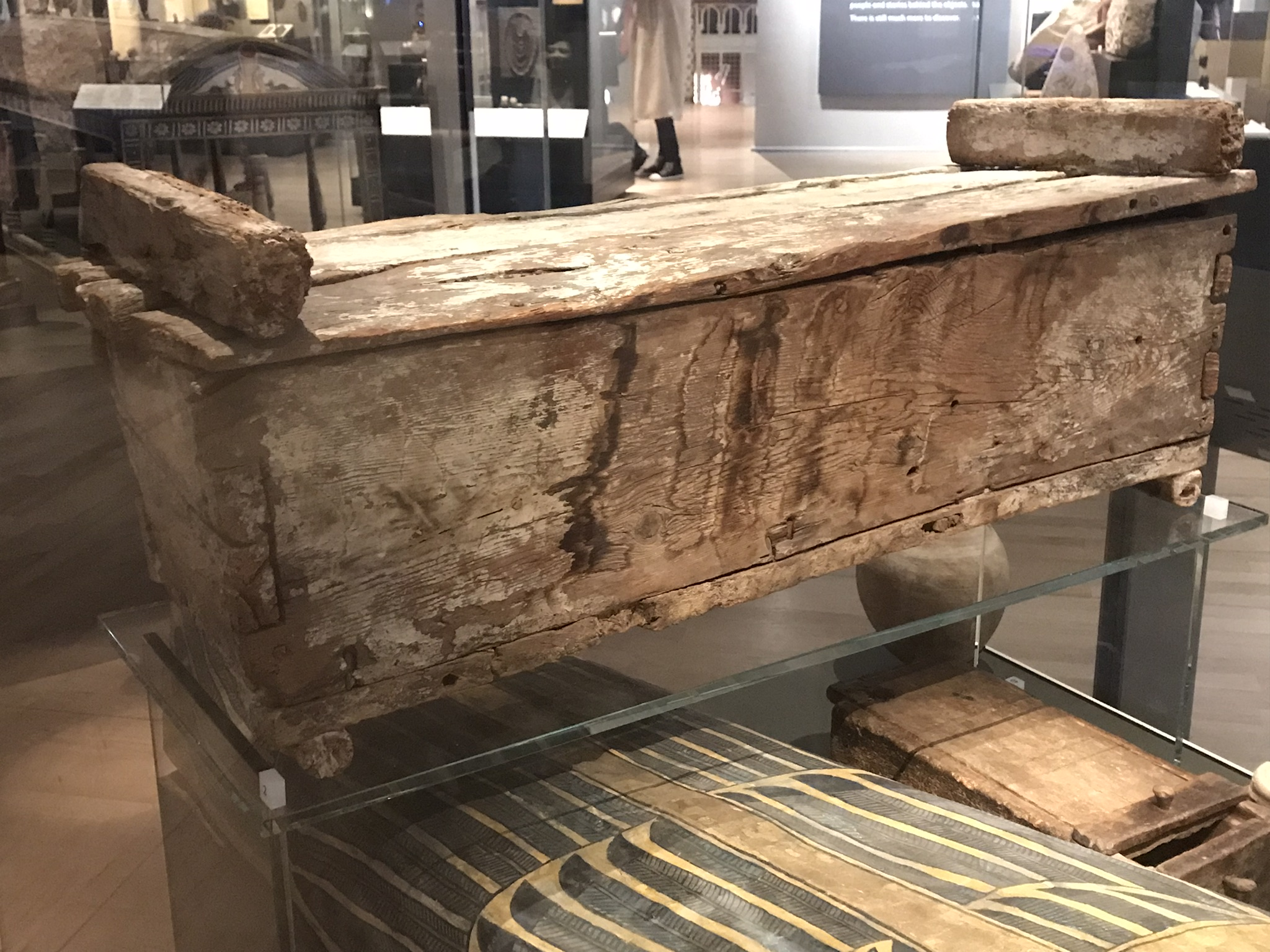
Coffin of a child found in the Qurna Queen's tomb

The mummified woman and her coffin were found during an excavation led by Flinders Petrie on 29 December 1908. The Qurna Queen shared her tomb with the coffin and mummy of a child aged between two and two-and-a-half.

Shortly after the excavation the mummified woman was unwrapped. The Egyptian Antiquities Service then agreed that the contents of the tomb could be exported as long as it was kept together. The mummified woman was transferred along with the contents of her tomb to The Royal Scottish Museum, arriving there by September 1909. The gold contents of the tomb were valued at £30 (equivalent to £3,087 in 2025), which was the most the Egyptian authorities had ever permitted to be exported.

In 1969 the coffin was subject to restoration with gaps being filled with Fibrenyle dough. In 2018 the coffin underwent conservation and stabilisation prior to re-display in 2019 as part of the Ancient Egypt Rediscovered gallery.
