= Shebyu collar =

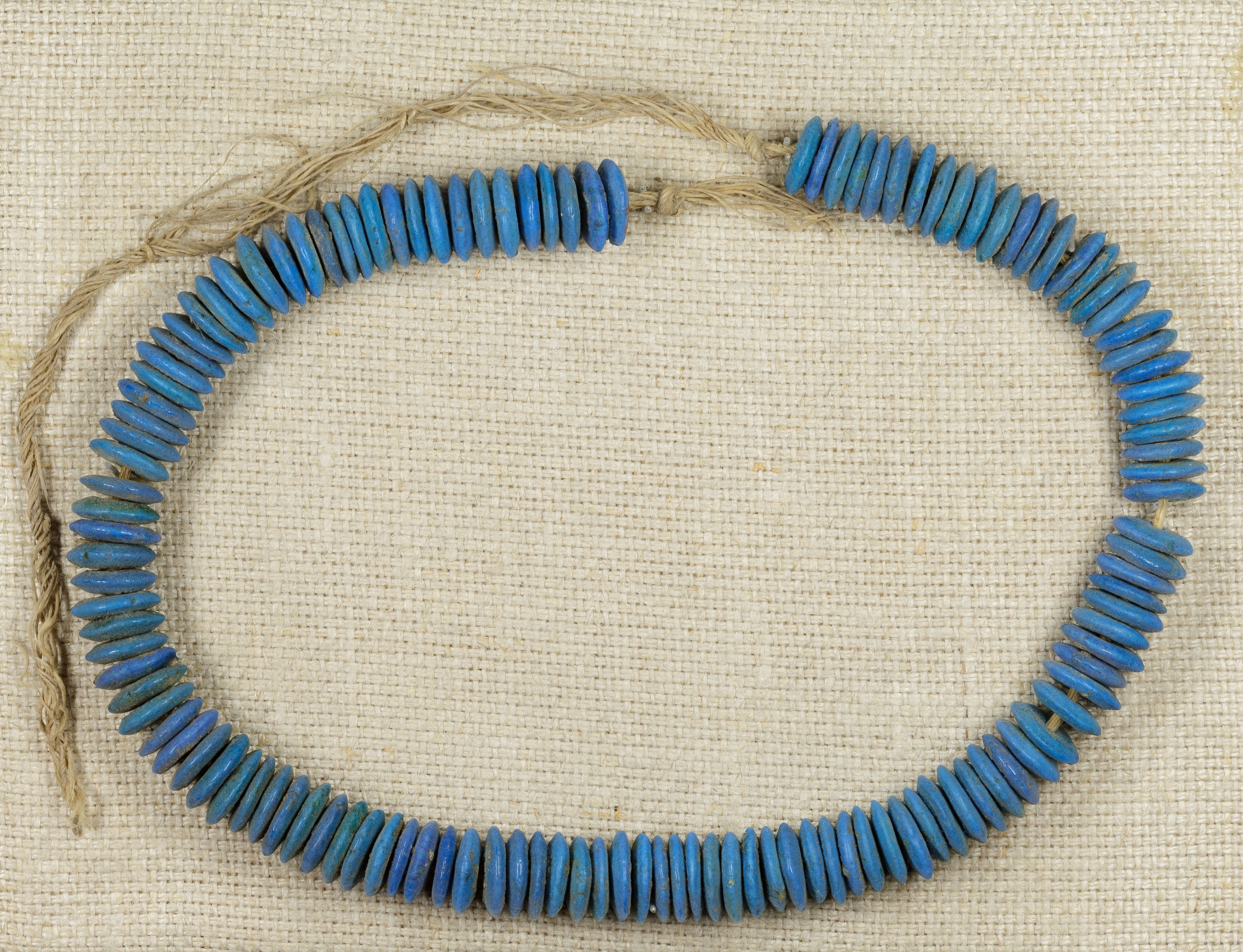
A shebyu collar of faience beads from the burial of Amenhotep

The shebyu collar is an ancient Egyptian necklace composed of one or more strands of disc beads. Collars specifically called shebyu by the ancient Egyptians are the two-stranded kind given to officials as part of a royal reward. However, the term is used in Egyptology to refer to any necklace composed of lenticular or disc beads regardless of the material.

The first mention of a shebyu collar comes from the tomb of Ahmose-Pennekhbet, in the reign of Ahmose I, who mentions the king gave him a collar as part of a royal reward. It is commonly depicted in art from the reign of Thutmose III onward in the mid-Eighteenth Dynasty. They are often depicted as being yellow (made of gold) but are occasionally multi-coloured, which matches some known examples.

The earliest physical example of a necklace thought to be a shebyu collar comes from the grave of the Qurna Queen, a woman of the Seventeenth Dynasty buried at Dra' Abu el-Naga'. Her collar is of four strands of gold rings. The earliest known shebyu of lenticular beads was discovered on the body of the mid-Eighteenth Dynasty foreman Kha, who was buried in TT8. His collar is only a single strand of large beads, leading to the suggestion that it may represent only the outermost strand. Tutankhamun was buried with several shebyu collars. The ones he wore in life are single stranded but were probably worn in pairs; his gold mask was equipped with a triple stranded example. Three and five stranded collars come from the burial of Psusennes I at Tanis.
