= Depiction of Hatshepsut's birth and coronation =

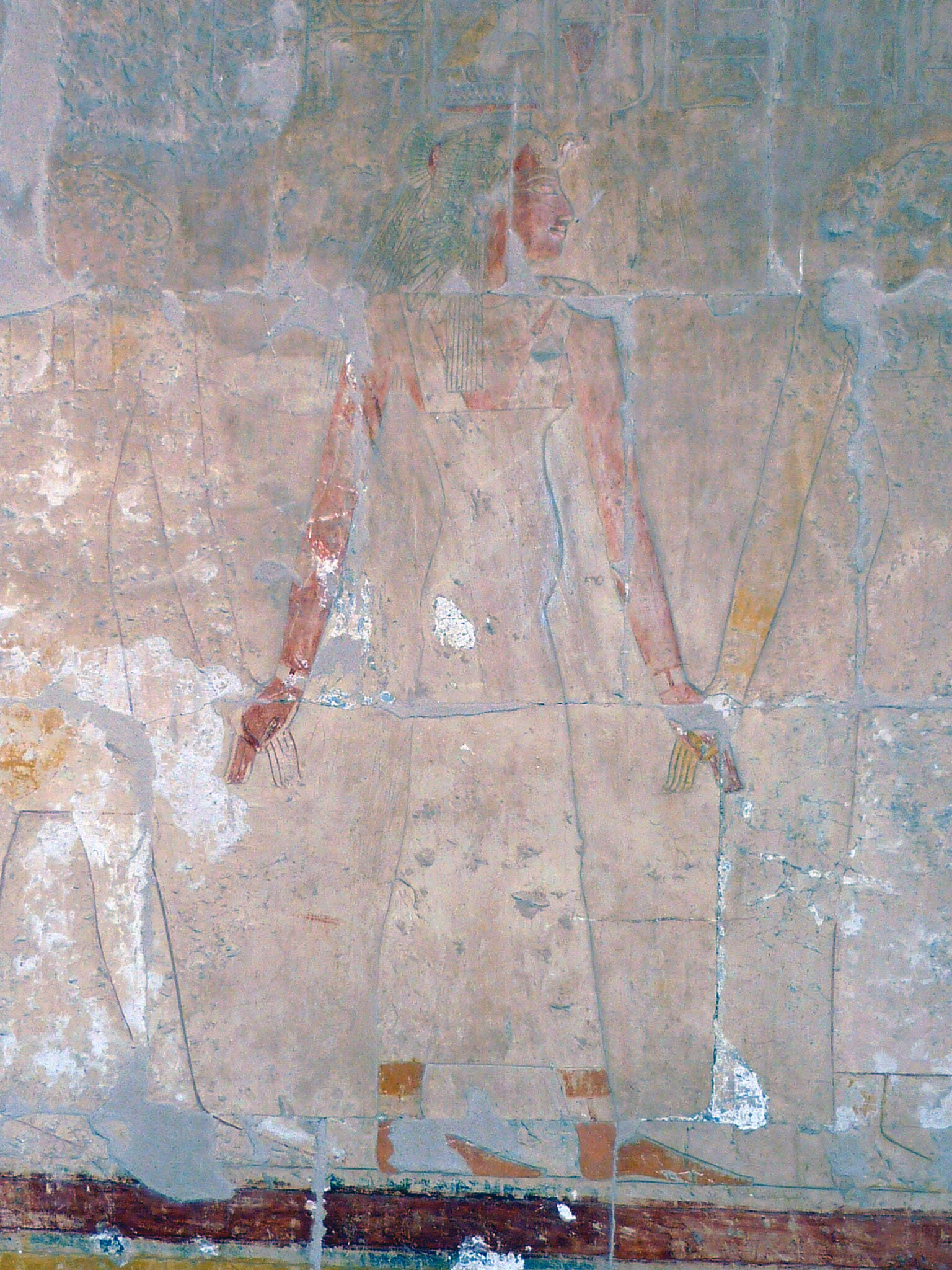
Bas-relief of Ahmes (mother of Hatshepsut) led to the place of delivery by Khnum and Heqet in the north portico of the second terrace, Temple of Hatshepsut, Deir el-Bahari, Theban necropolis, Egypt

Bas-relief carvings in the ancient Egyptian temple of Deir el-Bahari depict events in the life of the pharaoh or monarch Hatshepsut of the Eighteenth Dynasty. They show the Egyptian gods, in particular Amun, presiding over her creation, and describe the ceremonies of her coronation. Their purpose was to confirm the legitimacy of her status as a woman pharaoh. Later rulers attempted to erase the inscriptions.

== Lineage ==
Hatshepsut's royal lineage was established through her parents, Thutmose I her father and The Great Royal Wife Ahmose, her mother. Thutmose I had two sons and two daughters, Amenmose, Wadjmose, Hatshepsut and Neferubity, through Ahmose. Egyptian hierarchy established the eldest sons as heirs to the throne; however, these two sons died at an early age. It was still possible to produce a male heir through a secondary wife or lesser wife: Mutnofret, Thutmose I's secondary wife, gave birth to a son, Thutmose II, giving him lineage to the throne. To legitimize Thutmose II's reign, he married his half-sister Hatshepsut, who carried the royal Ahmose blood line. Through this marriage Hatshepsut was given her royal titles as Great King's Wife and God's Wife of Amun, empowering her to participate as a royal personage in cult rituals.

Hatshepsut only birthed a single child, the girl Neferure, with Thutmose II. However, Thutmose II's secondary wife, Isis, gave birth to a son, Thutmose III. During Thutmose III's infancy, his father Thutmose II died, leaving the throne to his son. As the son was an infant he could not yet become ruler. Traditionally, the mother of an infant pharaoh could become regent to rule on his behalf. This responsibility was given to either the "Great King's Wife" or "King's Mother", but these titles were not awarded to secondary wives such as Isis. Accordingly, Hatshepsut took the throne as regent through her titles of "King's Daughter, King's Sister, God's Wife, Great Royal Wife Hatshepsut".

== Hatshepsut's Divine Birth ==
Carvings depicting "Hatshepsut's Divine Birth and Coronation" can be found at the Temple of Deir el Bahari, Egypt. In the Divine Birth sequence, Amun calls upon a meeting of gods to announce the coming of a great and powerful queen. Amun asks the gods to bestow upon her protection and riches, and he promises to grant her power: “I will join for her the two lands in peace… I will give her all lands and all countries.”

Amun is told by the god Thoth that queen Ahmose is to have the divine child and introduces him to her. Upon this meeting, Amun causes Ahmose to “inhale the breath of life”. Thoth leads Amun to Ahmose's chamber where he has taken the form of her husband, Thutmose I. Amun in disguise, presents to her the ankh of life in her hand and nostrils. They both sit on a couch supported by two goddesses, Neith and Selk. Afterwards, Amun informs Ahmose that she is to give birth to a powerful queen and she is to rule both lands of Upper and Lower Egypt.

After the encounter, Amun instructs Khnum, the potter, to construct Hatshepsut's body and ka out of clay. Khnum bestows onto Hatshepsut “with life, health, and strength, and all gifts, I will make her appearance above the gods, because of her dignity of king of Upper and Lower Egypt.” Once finished, Khnum offers Hatshepsut and her ka to the god Heket, who presents them the ankh of life. After, Khnum again bestows more gifts of “offerings, all abundance.” as he praises the new queen with given divine power.

Thoth relays the message to Ahmose that Hatshepsut is given “all the dignities which will be bestowed upon her, all title which will be added to her name, since she is to be the mother of such an illustrious offspring.” She is also given an important royal title of “the friend and consort of Horus”. Ahmose is led into a chamber by Khnum and Heket, along with 12 gods and goddesses to help the birth and to protect Hatshepsut. Hatshepsut is born and held by her mother Ahmose, and is shown suckling from the other gods, giving her life and divinity.

== Hatshepsut's Coronation ==
Through her Coronation, she is emphasizing her legitimacy to rule Egypt by conveying that her father Thutmose I had crowned her king, leaving no doubt in any official's mind that she is a true and authentic ruler. Her coronation sequence, and her Divine Birth inscriptions, were vandalized or re-carved over by later kings. Naville's guess is that it was an ongoing obliteration of Hatshepsut's existence by later kings, who did not wish others to see a woman represented as becoming pharaoh through legitimate means.

Her coronation began with Thutmose I recognizing Hatshepsut as the next monarch through her blood lineage and gave her equal share of his responsibilities, despite opposition. Hatshepsut is depicted in various ways when receiving her crown. During her public coronation, she is shown as a male with female physique, and her clothing reflects this; Hatshepsut is depicted as a boy being crowned and revealed to her court, wearing a king's headdress and other male regalia. Naville observes that most common Egyptians could not read: thus an image of a woman pharaoh would be shocking, especially accompanied by two cartouches (royal name icons). After being crowned, she is taken to her throne to be seated, with royal dignitaries witnessing the event. She is then given five coronation names by the high priests. The priests then hold purification and other ceremonies depicting the new crowned pharaoh and her crowns representing both Upper and Lower Egypt. These observances were obligatory in inaugurating a new pharaoh of Egypt, even more so when it was a woman who became pharaoh; the ceremonial reinforced her status and rank as a legitimate leader.

== Legitimacy ==
Hatshepsut realized that she needed to legitimize her reign, beyond reliance on her bloodline as the only daughter of Thutmose I. For this she followed traditional practice by claiming her birth to be the will of a god, in the way that other kings had done since the fifth dynasty. She solidified these claims by having them inscribed in her mortuary temple walls at Deir el Bahari, which include her Divine Birth and Coronation sequence as well as the Expedition to Punt. These inscriptions were accessible only to high officials and priests, while other parts of her temple were accessible to the public during festivals. The inscriptions would confirm her authority in addition to upholding the worship of her god and father, Amun (to whom the temple is dedicated), through offerings and visitation. Within the temple, her Divine Birth can be found at the Middle Colonnade of the Northern Wall, and her Coronation at the Middle Colonnade of the Northern Wall (Upper Register).
