= Bee (disambiguation) =

A bee is a flying insect.

Bee, BEE or The Bee may also refer to:

== Places ==
=== United States ===
- Bee, Kentucky, an unincorporated community
- Bee, Minnesota, an unincorporated community
- Bee, Nebraska, a village
- Bee Cliff (Tennessee)
- Bee County, Texas
- Bee, Virginia, an unincorporated community
- Bee, Washington, an unincorporated community

=== Elsewhere ===
- Bee, New South Wales, Australia, a parish
- Bee, Piedmont, Italy, a commune

== Arts and entertainment ==
=== Fictional characters ===
- Aunt Bee, in the television series The Andy Griffith Show
- Mr. Weatherbee, nicknamed "the Bee", the high school principal in Archie Comics
- Bumblebee (Transformers) or Bee
- Bee, in the Quiz Kids magazines
- Bee, in the animated television series WordWorld
- Bee, the titular character in the film The Babysitter
- Bee, one of the titular characters in Bee and PuppyCat

=== Media ===
- List of newspapers named Bee
- Bee Group Newspapers, New York, US
- The Babylon Bee, a satire site
- The Bee (magazine), a literary magazine issued only during 1759
- The Bee (weekly), a publication of James Anderson of Hermiston started in 1791
- The Bee (radio station), a local radio station in Lancashire, England
- "Bees", a Series B episode of the television series QI (2004)
- "The Bee", an episode of the TV series Pocoyo

=== Music ===
- Bee (EP), by Tracy Bonham
- "Bee" (song), recorded by both Lena Meyer-Landrut and Jennifer Braun

== Organisations ==
- BEE Japan (Bicycle for Everyone's Earth)
- Bureau of Energy Efficiency, India

== Transportation ==
=== Airlines ===
- Flybe (1979–2020) (ICAO code BEE), a former airline based in Exeter, England
  - Flybe (2022–2023) (ICAO code BEE), a former airline based at Birmingham Airport, England
- French Bee, an airline based in Paris, France

=== Vehicles ===
- Bee (sloop), a ship that sank off the coast of Australia in 1806
- HMS Bee, three vessels and two shore establishments of the Royal Navy
- SS Bee
- Daihatsu Bee, a Japanese three-wheeled car
- Sopwith Bee, a small biplane built in 1916 as a personal aircraft

== People ==
- Bee (surname)
- Bee (given name)
- B. E. E., a pen name used by the American author E. E. Brown (fl. 1847–1904)

== Other uses ==
- B (named bee), a letter of the Latin alphabet
- Basal energy expenditure, of animals
- Bee (gathering), a gathering of people for work or competition
- Bee (hieroglyph), an Egyptian language hieroglyph
- Bee (mythology)
- Bee Building, Omaha, Nebraska, USm torn down in 1966
- Bee Playing Cards
- .218 Bee, a .22 caliber rifle cartridge
- .17 Ackley Bee, a rifle cartridge
- An-Nahl (The Bee), the 16th sūrah of the Qur'an
- Byangsi language (ISO 639-3 code)
- Black Economic Empowerment, a South African government program

== See also ==
- Saint Bee (disambiguation)
- The Bees (disambiguation)
- Book of the Bee, a 13th-century compilation containing numerous Bible legends
- Bee Gees, a music group
- Bee Movie, a 2007 American animated comedy film directed by Simon J. Smith and Steve Hickner
- Bee Bee Bee (born 1969), an American thoroughbred horse
- Bees Nursery, later Bees Ltd, a company formed by Arthur Bulley
- Spelling bee
- B (disambiguation)
- Be (disambiguation)
- Bea (disambiguation)
