= BE2 =

BE2 may refer to:

- Royal Aircraft Factory B.E.2, a WWI British Royal Flying Corps armed reconnaissance biplane
- Be2, a matchmaking service
- Blue Origin BE-2, a bipropellant kerolox rocket engine from Blue Origin
- Brazilian destroyer escort Beberibe (Be2)
- The EU NUTS I designation for the Flemish Region in Belgium

== See also ==
- Bebe (disambiguation)
- Bee (disambiguation)
- B2E
- 2BE (disambiguation)
- BE (disambiguation)
