= List of newspapers named Bee =

Bee is the name of the following newspapers:

== California ==
McClatchy

- The Sacramento Bee, Sacramento, founded in 1857
- The Fresno Bee, Fresno, founded in 1922
- The Modesto Bee, Modesto

== New York ==
Bee Group Newspapers
- Lancaster Bee,, serving Lancaster, founded in 1877
- Amherst Bee, founded in 1879 in Williamsville, New York, by Adam Lorenzo Rinewalt (1849–1902)
- Depew Bee, Depew, founded in 1893
- Clarence Bee, Clarence, founded in 1937
- Ken-Ton Bee, Kenmore and the town of Tonawanda, founded in 1982
- Cheektowaga Bee, Cheektowaga, founded in 1977
- West Seneca Bee, West Seneca, founded in 1980
- Orchard Park Bee, Orchard Park, founded in 1986
- East Aurora Bee, East Aurora, founded in 1987

== Other areas ==
- The New Orleans Bee (French: L’Abeille de la Nouvelle-Orléans) (1827–1925), a defunct newspaper based in New Orleans, Louisiana, mainly written in French with an English section
- Omaha Bee (1871–1920), a defunct newspaper from Omaha, Nebraska
- The Toledo Bee, Toledo, Ohio, merged into The Toledo News-Bee in 1903
- Portland Bee, a defunct newspaper in Portland, Oregon
- Sellwood Bee, a newspaper based in Sellwood, a neighborhood of Portland, Oregon
- Danville Bee, which merged with The Danville Register to form the Danville Register & Bee, Danville, Virginia, in 1989
- Washington Bee (1882–1922), a defunct weekly newspaper based in Washington, D.C., primarily read by African-Americans
- The Newtown Bee, a weekly newspaper published in Newtown, Connecticut since 1877

== See also ==
- Lake County Record-Bee, Lakeport, California
