= Paheri =

Ancient Egyptian mayor of El-Kab

- Mayor of Elkab
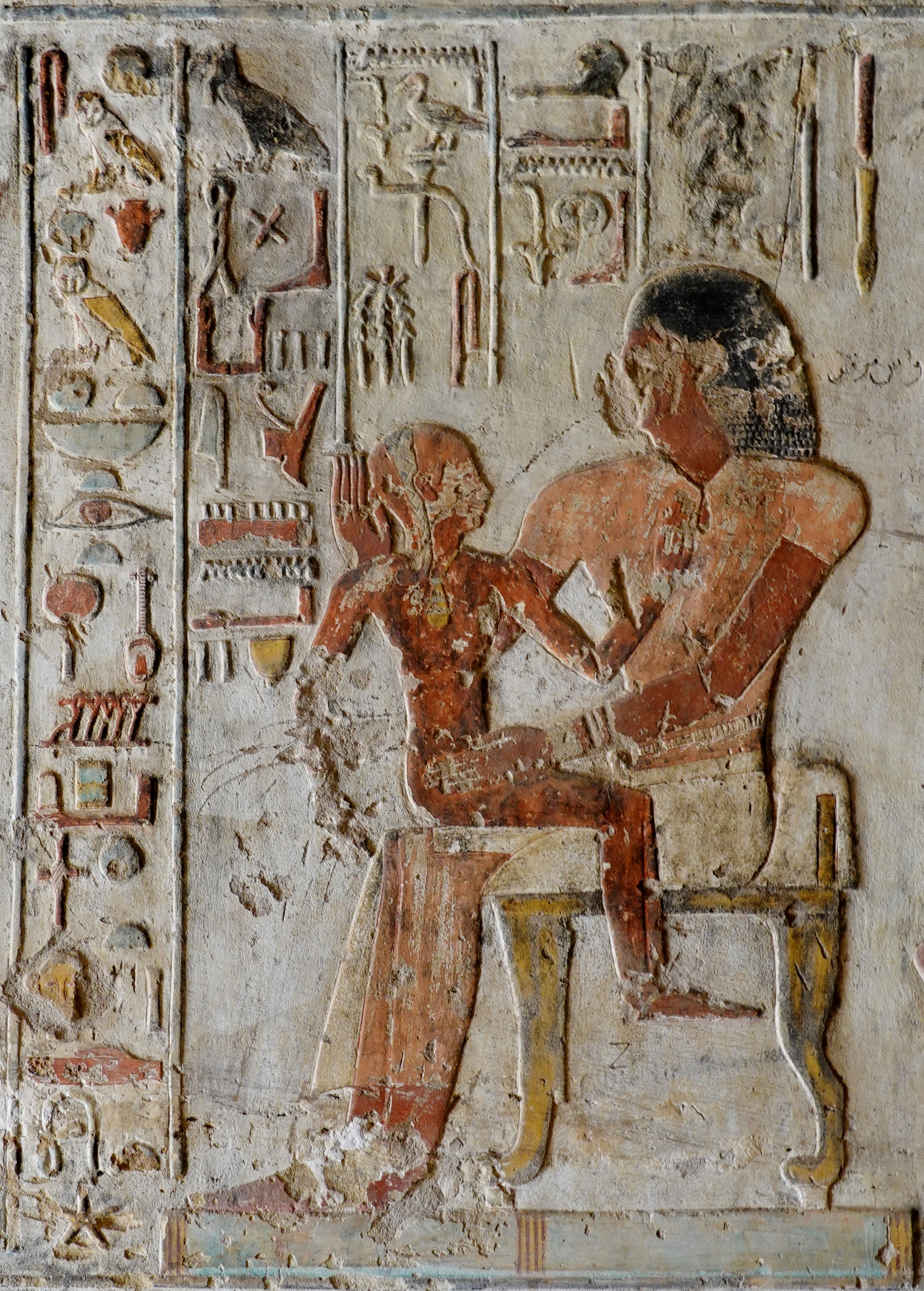
- Paheri and Wadjmose, Thutmose I’s son
- Dynasty: 18th Dynasty (early)
- Pharaoh: Thutmose I - Thutmose III
- Burial: Tomb at Elkab (EK3)
- Father: Atefrura
- Mother: Kemi, daughter of Ahmose, son of Ebana

Paheri (p3-ḫrỉ, "The Celestial" or p3-ḥr-r(w)-ỉ) was a prominent provincial governor, royal tutor, treasury administrator, and high-ranking priest in Upper Egypt during the early 18th dynasty, serving under Thutmose I, Thutmose II, Hatshepsut and Thutmoses III.

== Biography ==
=== Family ===
Paheri was born to Lady of the House Kemi, daughter of Ahmose, son of Ebana. His famous maternal grandfather Ahmose was the captain of the Egyptian fleet during the wars of independence against the Hyksos under king Ahmose I, documenting the fall of Avaris, the Hyksos capital city. His maternal side had elite status at Neheb/Elkab, and Paheri may have inherited wealth and land through his mother from his maternal grandfather Ahmose, son of Ebana's royal land grants.

Paheri was the son of the tutor of the king's son and scribe Atefrura. His father is documented as the tutor of the king's son Wadjmose. Paheri, hence, had close ties to the Egyptian royal family. A similar relationship is also documented for Paheri.

Paheri married Henuterneheh, daughter of Chief of Gold Miners/quarrymen Ruru (ḥrj qwr rr) and born to Taidit. Henuterneheh held the title Lady of the House, and together they had nine children. This marriage may have secured mining expeditions.

=== Career ===
Paheri began his career during the reign of Thutmose I and remained active in provincial administration until his death under Thutmose III. Despite close ties to the royal family and central treasury, he remained a provincial official, serving as mayor (ḥꜣtj-ꜥ) of Nekheb and Iunyt rather than advancing to a high office in the central bureaucracy.

Paheri (pꜣ-ḥrj) held the titles of Mayor of Nekheb (ḥꜣtj-ꜥ n nḫb; Elkab), Mayor of Iunyt (ḥꜣtj-ꜥ n jwnjjt Esna), Mayor (ḥꜣtj-ꜥ), Scribe (sš), Excellent Scribe (sš jqr), Counter of Grain (ḥsb (n) jt), Overseer of the Fields of the Southern District (jmj-rꜣ ꜣḥwt nw ꜥ rsj), Tutor of the King's Son (mnꜥj n sꜣ-nsw), Vigilant Controller (ḫrp rsj-tp), Confidant of the Overseer of the Treasury in the Southland (mḥ-jb n jmj-rꜣ ḫtmt m tꜣ ḫntjjt), Overseer of the Priests of Nekhbet (jmj-rꜣ ḥmw-nṯr n nḫbt), and Overseer of Priests (jmj-rꜣ ḥmw-nṯr).

As scribe and royal tutor, he followed in the footsteps of his father Atefrura. Paheri was appointed as tutor and nurse to Prince Wadjmose, a son of Pharaoh Thutmose I. Inscriptions and reliefs in Tomb EK3 depict Paheri holding the young prince on his lap, and in another scene he is shown offering sacrifices to Wadjmose and another of Thutmose I's sons, Prince Amenmose. Wadjmose and another prince named Ramose are also mentioned in the Theban funerary chapel of Thutmose I alongside Queen Mutnofret. Wadjmose is believed to have predeceased his father, as Thutmose I was succeeded by another son, Thutmose II.

Around this time, Paheri became the patron of the Tomb of Ahmose, son of Ebana (EK5). He was not yet attested as mayor or treasury official. Here he bears the title Scribe/Outline-Draughtsman of Amun (sš-qdwt n jmn), explicitly taking credit for decorating and inscribing the tomb. One inscription reads: "It was his daughter's son who directed the work in this tomb, perpetuating the name of his mother's father, the outline-draughtsman of Amun, Paheri."

His bureaucratic career centered on state agriculture, grain accounting, and revenue oversight across southern Upper Egypt. With the titles Counter of Grain (ḥsb (n) jt) and Overseer of the Fields of the Southern District (jmj-rꜣ ꜣḥwt nw ꜥ rsj), he supervised agricultural production, land surveying, harvesting, and tax assessments across the fertile district stretching from Per-Hathor (Gebelein) south to Nekheb. Scenes in his tomb document every stage of this agricultural administration (plowing, sowing, and reaping to winnowing, measuring grain, and loading cargo ships for transport to state granaries). As Confidant of the Overseer of the Treasury in the Southland (mḥ-jb n jmj-rꜣ ḫtmt m tꜣ ḫntjjt) and Vigilant Controller (ḫrp rsj-tp), he became a trusted regional deputy for the central Treasury. He may have reported to the Overseer of the Treasury, such as Sennefer or Nehsy under Hatshepsut/Thutmose III. Paheri oversaw the collection, accounting, and shipment of regional revenues, including gold and local tribute. Scenes on the west wall of EK3 depict Paheri supervising the weighing of gold rings/nuggets brought as regional revenue—directly connecting his treasury role and his marriage into the family of the ḥrj qwr ("Chief of Gold-Miners") Ruru to Eastern Desert gold production.

At the height of his career, Paheri consolidated civil and religious authority over two major Upper Egyptian cities as Mayor of Nekheb (ḥꜣtj-ꜥ n nḫb; Elkab) and Mayor of Iunyt (ḥꜣtj-ꜥ n jwnjjt; Esna). As dual nomarch/mayor of both El Kab and Esna, he governed local civic administration, justice, and regional infrastructure on both banks of the Nile. As Overseer of the Priests of Nekhbet (jmj-rꜣ ḥmw-nṯr n nḫbt), he directed the temple administration and priesthood of Nekhbet, the patron vulture-goddess of Upper Egypt and protector of the pharaoh. In the New Kingdom, traditional hereditary nomarchs of the Middle Kingdom had been replaced by crown-appointed mayors (ḥꜣtj-ꜥ) drawn from trusted bureaucratic and military families. Paheri was especially qualified with local wealth and elite connections to Elkab, as well as his ties to the royal family.

== Attestations ==
Paheri has two main attestations.

- Tomb Elkab 3 (EK3) belonging to Paheri.
- Tomb Elkab 5 (EK5) where Paheri is the patron.

== Death ==
Paheri died during the reign of Thutmose III. The Tomb of Paheri was decorated during this time. No Mummy of Paheri has been found.

=== Tomb of Paheri (EK3) ===
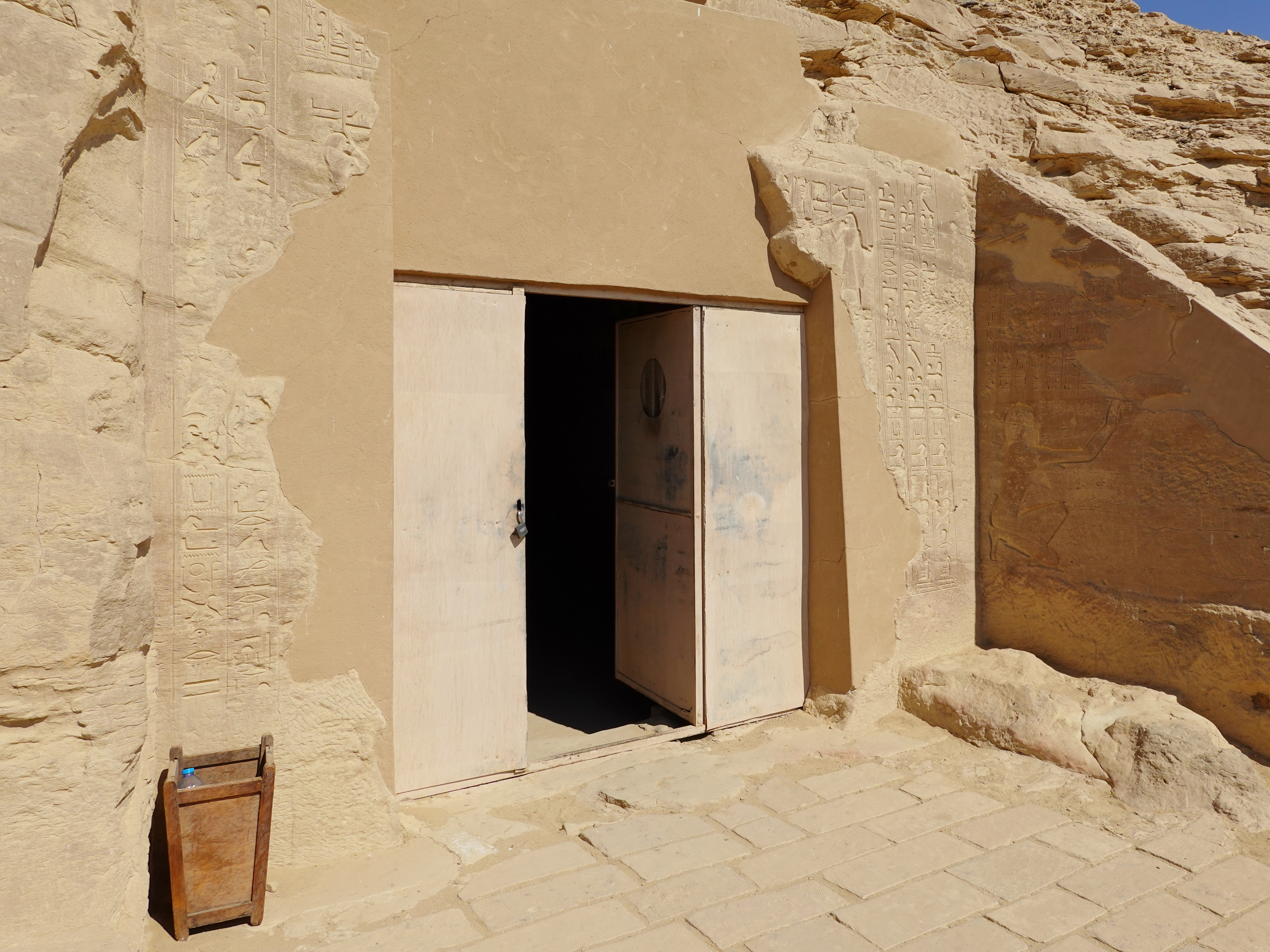
The entrance to Paheri’s tomb, EK3, near Elkab

At Elkab, the Tomb of Paheri (EK3) is a finely decorated rock tomb. It consists of a small chamber of 8.3 metres length and 3.8 metres width and its maximum height reaches 3.5 metres. It was rediscovered by a European Egyptian expedition in 1799, while James Burton published the contents of the two walls of its tomb chamber in 1825.

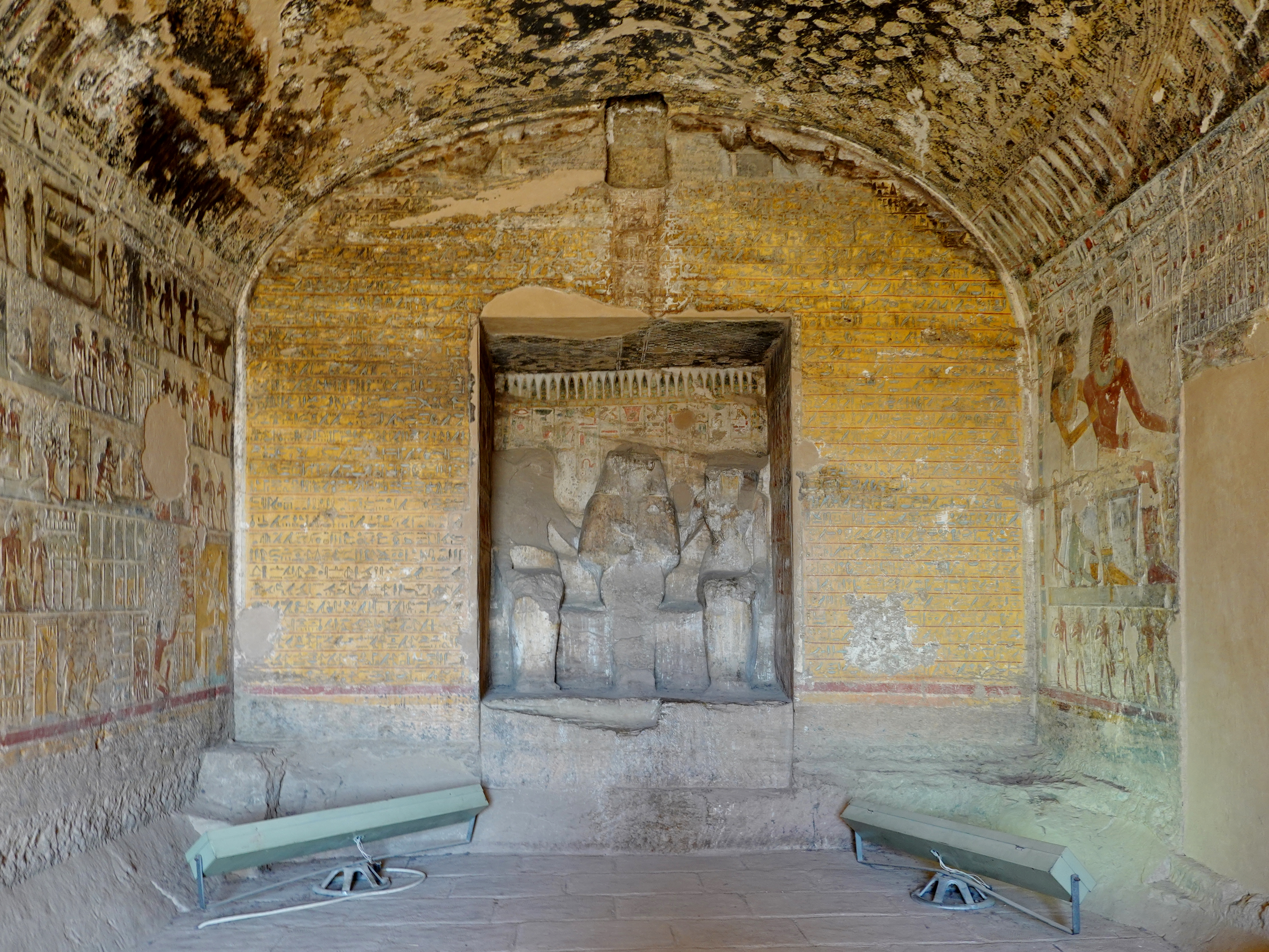
The rock tomb of Paheri near Elkab

The tomb was decorated with numerous reliefs and is one of the best preserved from the early 18th Dynasty. It shows the importance of the city of Elkab during the late 17th and early 18th dynasties.

The tomb consists of a chapel, which in turn consists of a single room, and has a shaft in front of it that leads down to the burial chamber. The western wall depicts agricultural scenes and funerary rituals, while the eastern wall depicts a large banquet. On the rear northern wall is a niche containing three statues depicting Paheri, his wife Henuterneheh, and his mother Kemi. The rest of the wall bears a large biographical inscription.

In one scene, Paheri is shown making sacrifices to Wadjmose and to the other king's son, Amenmose.

An inscription written over the funeral procession of the deceased Paheri reads:

"Making a good burial for the prince Paheri, conveying the Prince Paheri, justified, to his chamber of the Kherneter, in peace, in peace before the great god. Proceeding in peace to the horizon, to the Field of Reeds, to the Tuat; to lead to (any) place where this prince Paheri (may be)....[Said by the followers (of the procession),]....Proceed in peace, in peace to his (sic) chamber of Kher-neter (the necropolis); receive banquets among the nobles (or the aged ones?) as a follower of the great god."

== Gallery ==
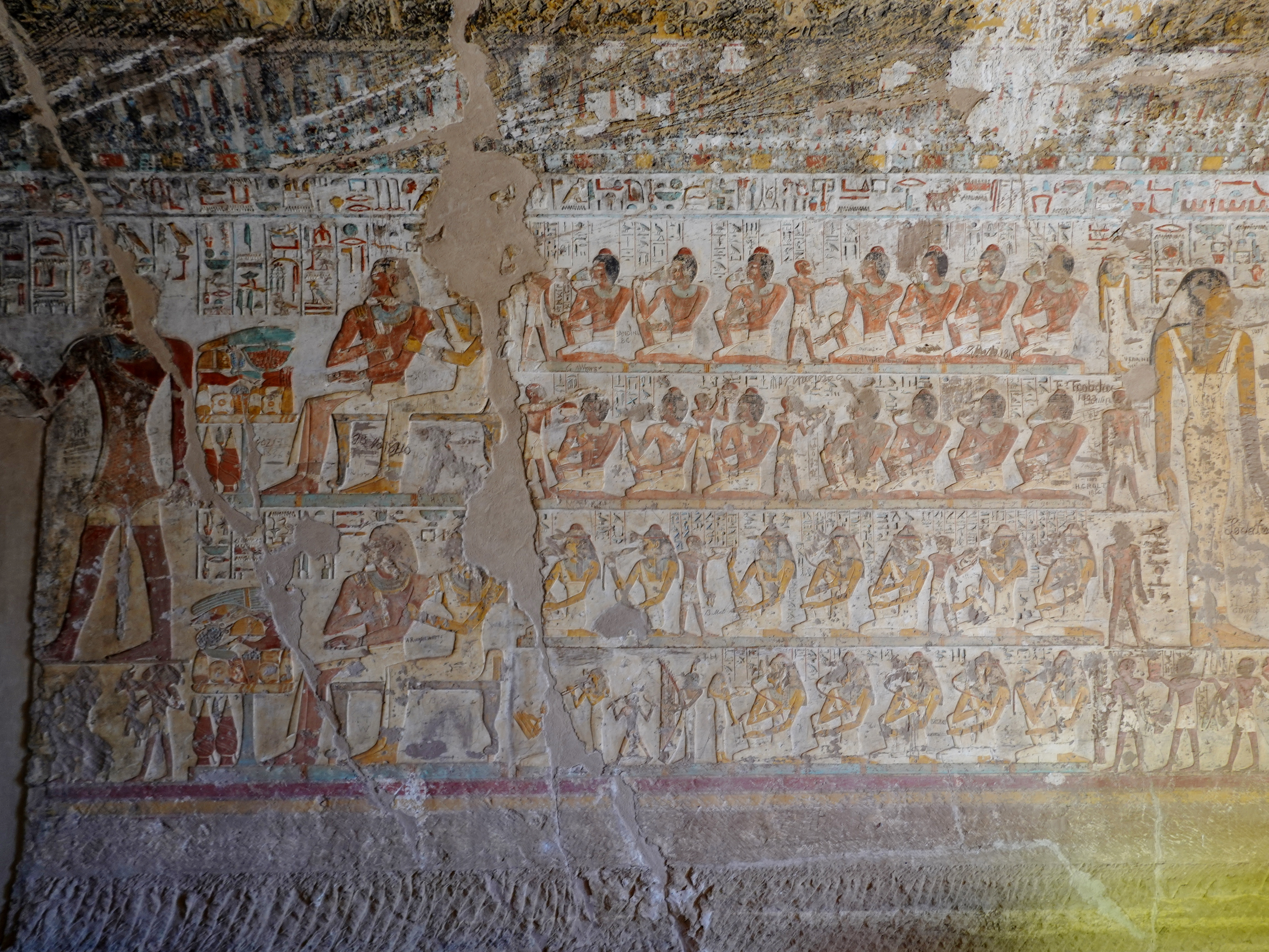
Finely painted reliefs from Paheri’s tomb.

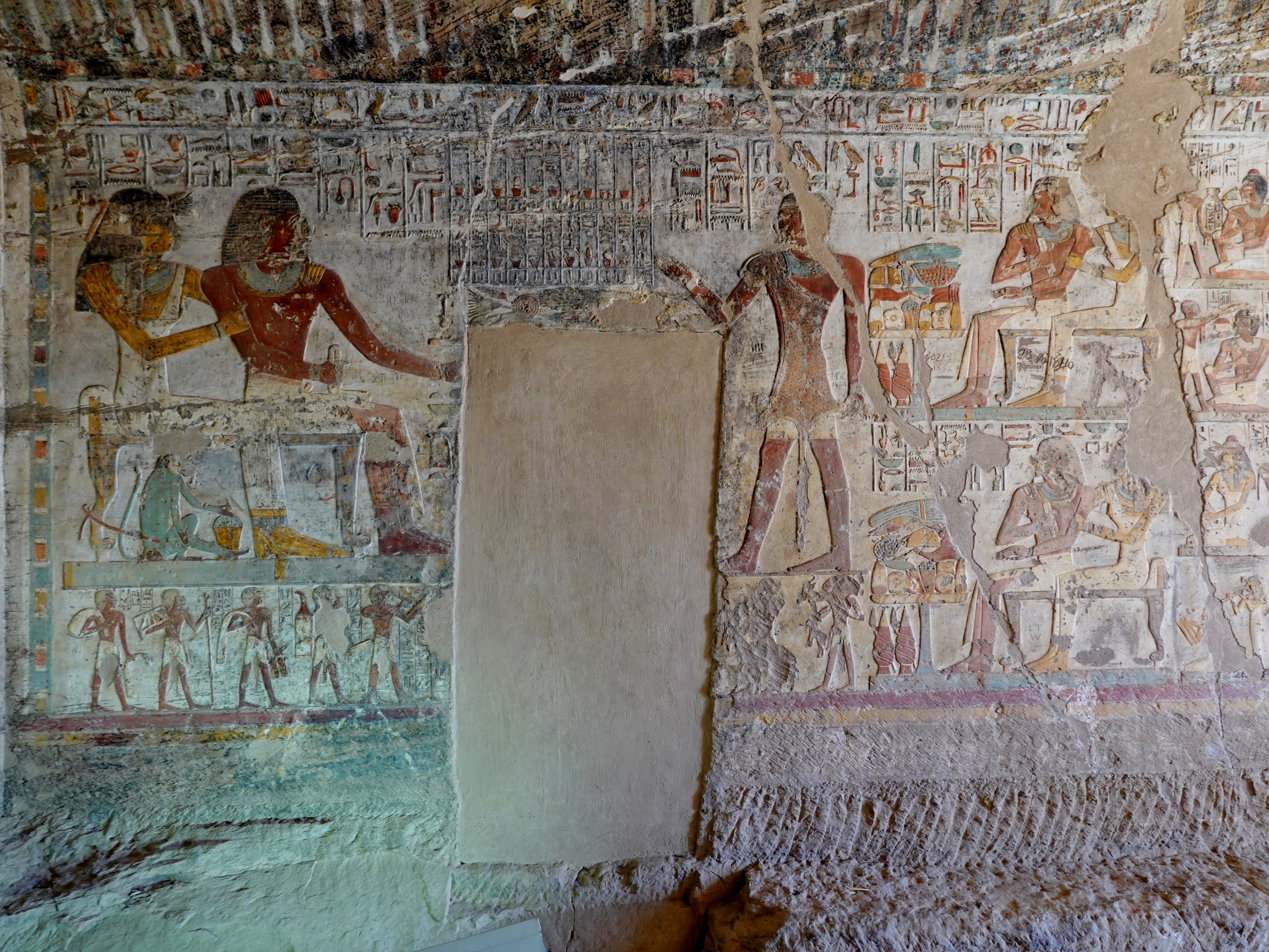
A Procession of food and gift offerings to Paheri and his wife in the afterlife

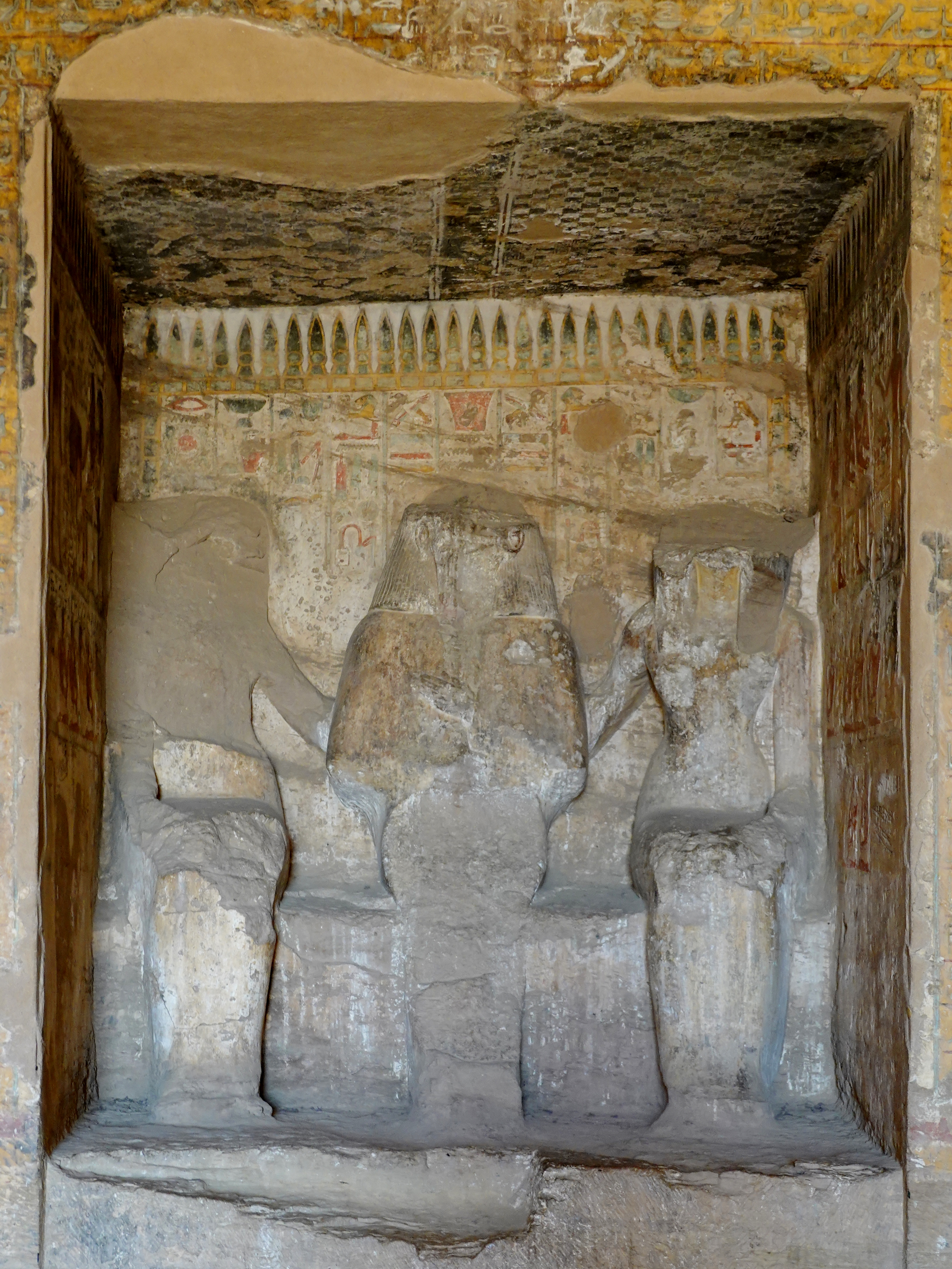
The northern wall of Paheri's tomb with a damaged niche featuring three statues of Paheri, his wife Henuterneheh, and his mother Kemi
