= 2BE =

2BE may refer to:

- 2BE Belfast, former radio station in Belfast, Northern Ireland
- 2BE (TV channel), a commercial TV channel in Flanders
- 2BE, the former call sign of radio station 2EC in Bega, New South Wales, Australia
- 2BE (Sydney), Australia's first B Class or commercial radio station

== See also ==
- BE (disambiguation)
- BBE (disambiguation)
- Bebe (disambiguation)
