= Ahmose, son of Ebana =

Ancient Egyptian soldier and warrior

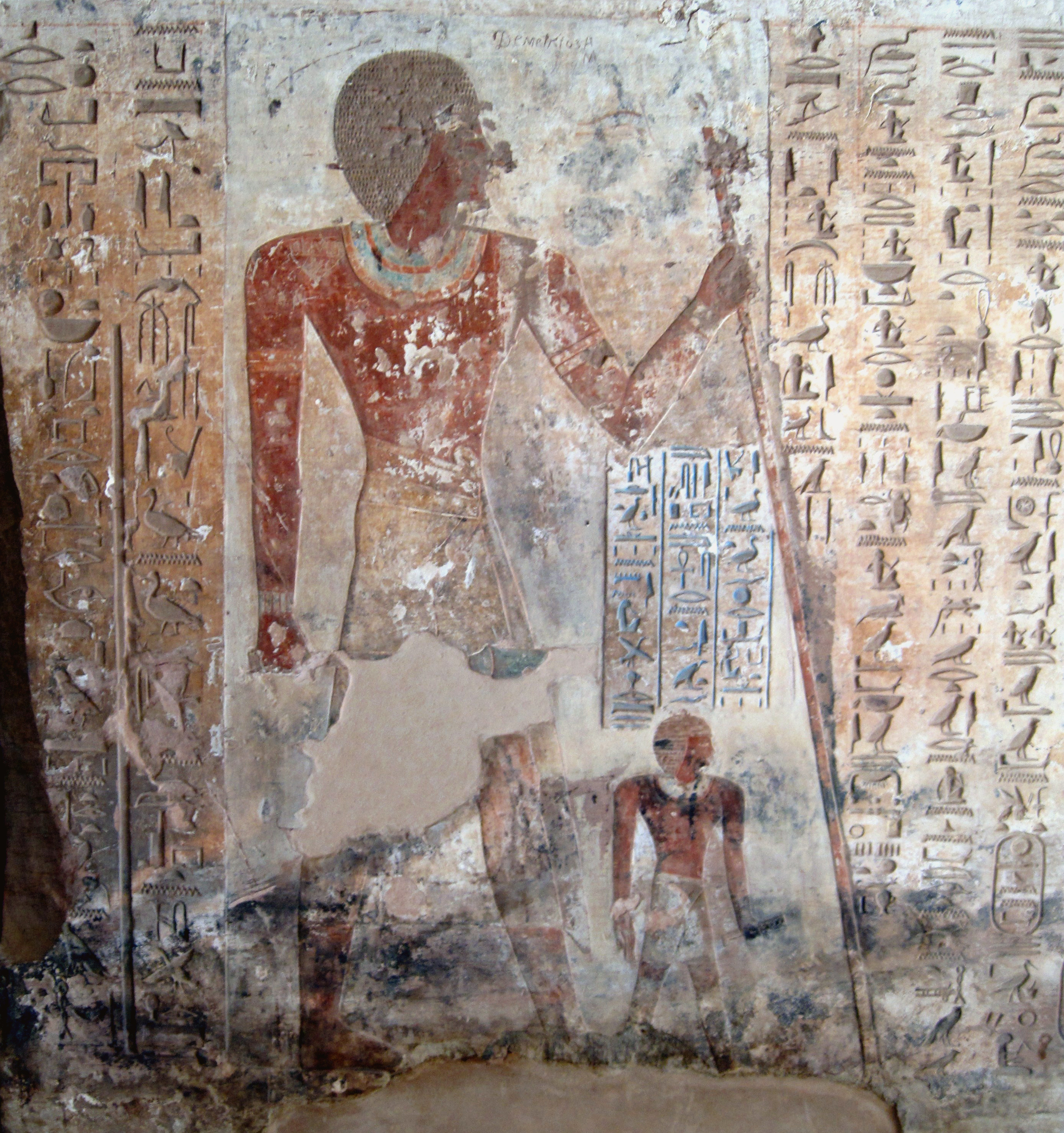
- Ahmose depicted in his tomb at El Kab
- Born: 16th century BC; Nekheb (modern El Kab)
- Died: 16th century BC; Nekheb (modern El Kab)
- Burial place: El Kab
- Military career
- Allegiance: 17th Dynasty of Egypt; 18th Dynasty of Egypt
- Known for: Military service under Ahmose I, Amenhotep I, and Thutmose I

Ahmose, son of Ebana, (Amosis, Aahmes; meaning "Iah (the Moon) is born") served in the Egyptian military under the pharaohs Ahmose I, Amenhotep I, and Thutmose I. His autobiography, which is inscribed on the wall of his tomb, and remains remarkably intact, is a valuable source of information on the late 17th Dynasty and the early 18th Dynasty of Egypt.

== Family ==
Ahmose was born in the city of Nekheb, the modern El Kab.

Ebana was the name of Ahmose's mother, who was most likely a woman of importance on Egyptian society; his father's name was Baba. Paheri, the grandson of Ahmose and a scribe and priest of the goddess Nekhbet and tutor to the prince Wadjmose, supervised the building of his grandfather's tomb.

== Life ==
=== Reign of Seqenenre ===
During the war to expel the Hyksos from Egypt, in the reign of Seqenenre Tao, his father enlisted in the navy.

=== Reign of Ahmose I ===
After the deaths of Tao and his son Kamose, Ahmose began to serve as a soldier under Pharaoh Ahmose I. He participated in the battle of Avaris (the Hyksos capital in the Delta), where he killed two Hyksos and was awarded the "gold of valor" twice. Ahmose was awarded slaves and other spoils by the pharaoh after Avaris was sacked. Ahmose also participated in the three-year siege of Sharuhen in southern Canaan for which he was rewarded. He followed his king to Nubia, where they put down three rebellions.

=== Reign of Amenhotep I ===
Under Amenhotep I, he fought against the Nubians and was given gold and slaves for his bravery.

=== Reign of Thutmose I ===
During the reign of Thutmose I, Ahmose participated in a naval campaign against Nubian tribes in the Nile valley and was appointed admiral. He also followed Thutmose on a campaign against Naharin all the way to the Euphrates River.

== Bibliography ==
- "Biography of Ahmose, son of Ebana" in Ancient Records of Egypt by James Henry Breasted, Part Two, sections 1 to 24, 38ff and 78ff.
- "The Autobiography of Ahmose Son of Abana" in Ancient Egyptian Literature by M. Lichtheim, vol.2, pp. 12ff.
- Leprohon, Ronald J. (2013). The Great Name: Ancient Egyptian Royal Titulary. SBL Press. ISBN 978-1-58983-736-2.
