= Neferubity =

Egyptian princess

- King's Daughter
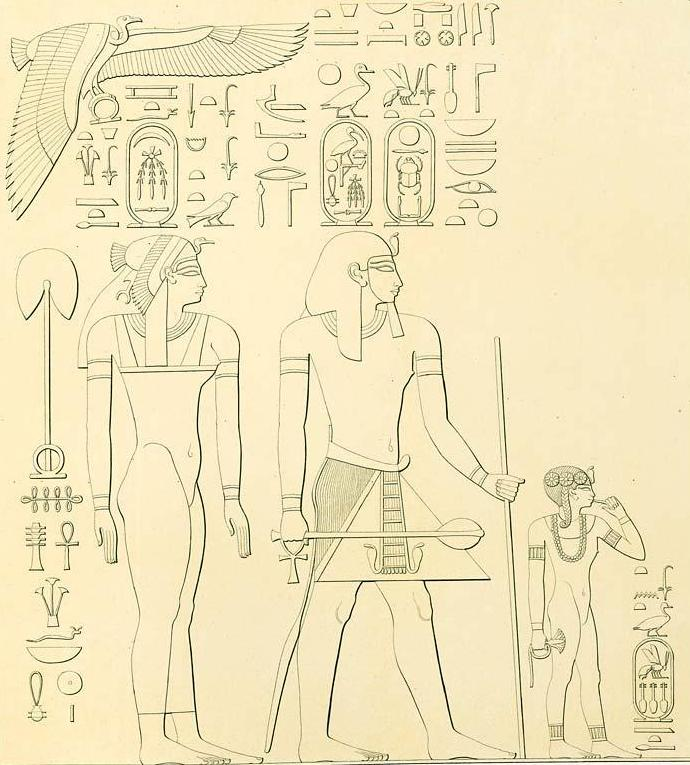
- Neferubity with Queen Ahmose and Pharaoh Thutmose I at Deir el-Bahari
Egyptian name
L2 nfr nfr nfr
- Dynasty: 18th Dynasty
- Father: Thutmose I
- Mother: Ahmose

Neferubity (Ancient Egyptian: nfrw bity) was an ancient Egyptian princess of the 18th Dynasty. She was the daughter of Pharaoh Thutmose I and Ahmose, the sister of Hatshepsut and the half-sister of Thutmose II, Wadjmose and Amenmose.

Her name means "Beauties of Lower Egypt" through the hieroglyphs "nefer", meaning "beauty", and "bity", meaning "Lower Egypt".

She is depicted with her parents Thutmose I and Ahmose in Hatshepsut's Deir el-Bahari mortuary temple, then vanishes. It is assumed that she died young, with her only depiction having a "sidelock of youth".
