= Antiques and the Arts Weekly =

American national weekly trade magazine

Antiques and the Arts Weekly, founded in 1963, is an American national weekly magazine covering art and antiques.

== History ==
Antiques and the Arts Weekly was founded in 1963 by R. Scudder Smith, publisher of the Newtown Bee, a newspaper covering Newtown, Connecticut that was established by Smith's grandfather in 1877. In 1988, the Weekly had a paid circulation of 23,000 in Europe, Canada, and the United States. A trade publication, the Weekly is regarded as an important source of journalism about the American and Canadian antiques market.

In 1991, architect Roger P. Ferris of Southport, Connecticut, designed a large new printing plant for the Weekly, with a fieldstone base and cedar shingle walls and roof designed to fit in with Newtown's carefully preserved historic look.
