= Yuf =

Ancient Egyptian priest

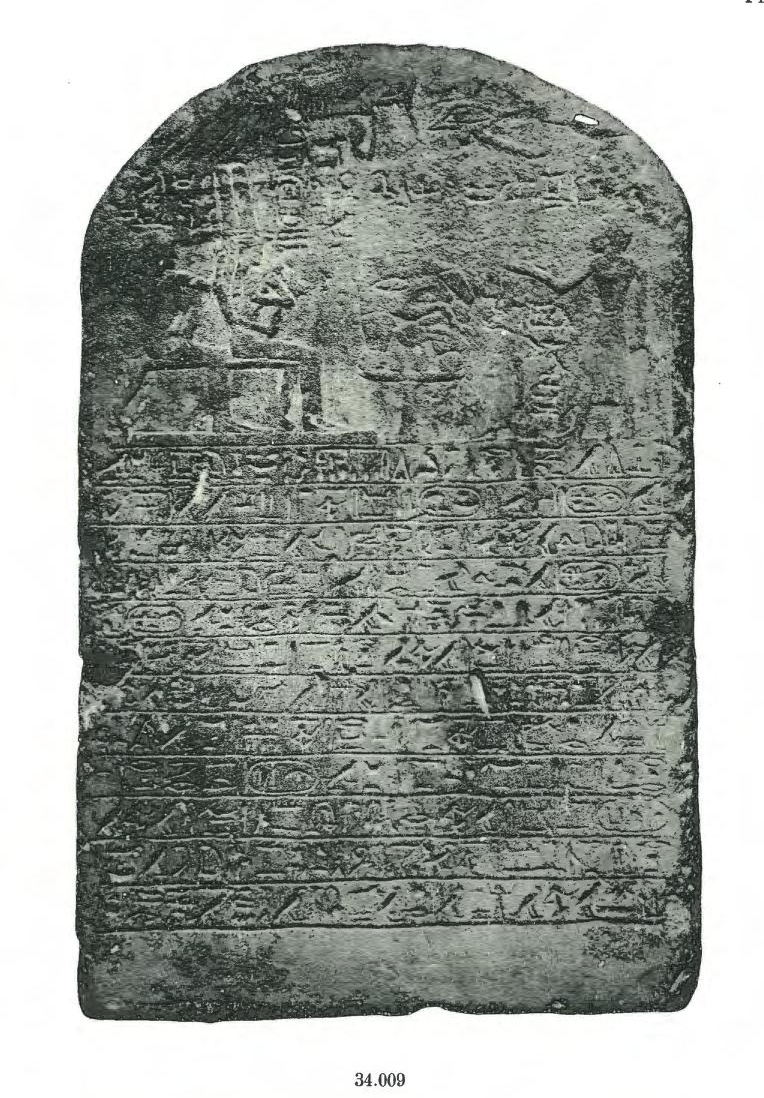
Stela of Yuf

D54 w f A1
Yuf
in hieroglyphs
Era: New Kingdom
(1550–1069 BC)

Yuf was an Ancient Egyptian priest and official who is known from a stela found in Edfu, and now in the Egyptian Museum in Cairo (inv.no. CG 34009, JdE 27091). He lived at the beginning of the 18th Dynasty. On his stela he reports that queen Ahhotep, the mother of pharaoh Ahmose I, appointed him as the second prophet of the dues (S'w) of the altar, as the door-keeper of the temple, and as a priest. He also served a number of royal women. He then reports that he was responsible for repairing the disturbed tomb of Queen Sobekemsaf of the 17th Dynasty, and eventually served Queen Ahmose, wife of king Thutmose I. Yuf recorded that Queen Ahmose appointed him as scribe of the god's sealer and entrusted him with the service to a statue of her majesty.
