= Amenmose (prince) =

Ancient Egyptian prince

i mn n F31 simn ms
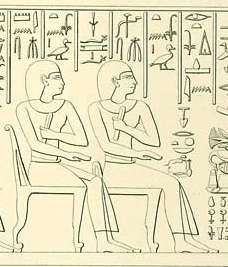
- Amenmose with his brother Wadjmose in the tomb of Paheri
- Relatives: Thutmose I
- Military career
- Allegiance: 18th dynasty of Egypt (Thutmose I)
- Rank: Overseers of the troops

Amenmose was an ancient Egyptian prince. He lived during the 18th dynasty and was the eldest son and designated heir of Thutmose I.

== Family ==
Amenmose is likely to have been born before his father ascended the throne. It is not known who was his mother or his brother Wadjmose's mother. She is likely to have been either the Great Royal Wife Ahmose, who was also the mother of Hatshepsut and Neferubity, or the secondary queen Mutnofret, who also was the mother of Thutmose II.

== Life ==
=== Reign of Thutmose I ===
When Thutmose I (r. 1525-1514 BCE, 12 regnal years, high chronology) became king, Amenmose was already a young man, receiving the title Eldest King's Son.

Year 02 | In Year 2 of Thutmose I, Amenmose already held the titles Eldest King's Son and Overseer of Troops. Consequently, Amenmose was an adult with military experience to be an overseer of troops.

Year 04 | A fragment of Amenmose's small stone naos has also been found dated to year 4 of Thutmose I. Amenmose's name was written in a cartouche, which was usually restricted to pharaohs and their chief queens; it was rare for a crown prince to be identified in this manner. Amenmose was the first Egyptian prince to receive a military title (that of "Great Overseer of Soldiers"), reflecting the role of pharaohs and princes as generals. This title first appeared during the Middle Kingdom and was later used frequently for princes during the Ramesside period.

== Attestations ==
Amenmose is known from four attestations.

- UC 11930 | A steatite scarab seal (15x11 mm) belonging to King's Son Amenmose.
- Davies, Sudan & Nubia 5, 50 fig. 5 | At Hagar el-Merwa, a rock inscription mentioning Eldest King's Son Amenmose.
- Akasha 21-S-29 Face A, 1 | At Akasha, a rock inscroption dated to Year 2 of Thutmose I, with Amenmose holding the titles Eldest King's Son and Overseer of Troops.
- Louvre E 8074 | At Giza, a lintel/naos dated to Year 4 of Thutmose I, mentioning Eldest King's Son and Great Overseer of Troops, Amenmose (name in cartouche). This may indicate that Amenmose had become the designated heir.
- Elkab tomb 3 | Post-humous mention of King's Son Amenmose. Amenmose is depicted in the el-Kab tomb of his and Wadjmose's tutor, Paheri.

== Death ==
Amenmose died before the end of the reign of Thutmose I, during Years 5-12, leaving Thutmose II the heir instead. No Tomb of Amenmose or Mummy of Amenmose have been found.
