= Sidelock of youth =

Hairstyle in Ancient Egypt

drawing of an Ancient Egyptian child, depicted naked with the sidelock of youth.

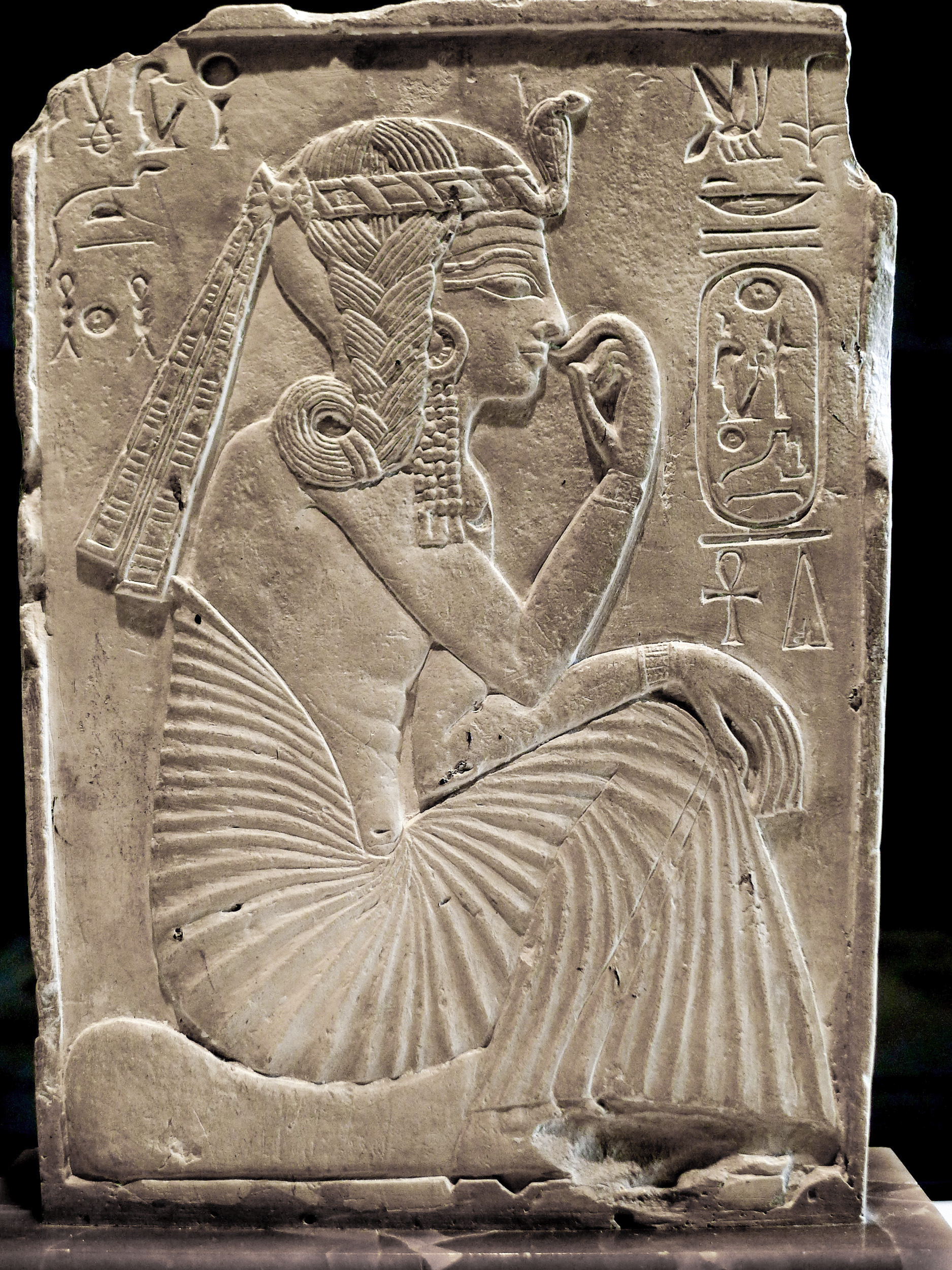
Rameses II as crown prince represented as a child with his sidelock.

The sidelock of youth (also called a Horus lock, Prince's lock, Princess' lock, lock of childhood or side braid) was an identifying characteristic of the child in Ancient Egypt. It symbolically indicates that the wearer is a legitimate heir of Osiris. The sidelock was used as a divine attribute from at least as early as the Old Kingdom.

In earlier depictions, the sidelock can be seen with short hat-like hairstyles in, for example, mortuary cults. Later it was usually attached to an almost shoulder-length wig, which was worn in three styles: curled, straight, or in tresses. Based on the connection between sidelocks and children, Egyptologists coined the term "sidelock of youth". They were worn by both mortal and divine children.

== Forms ==
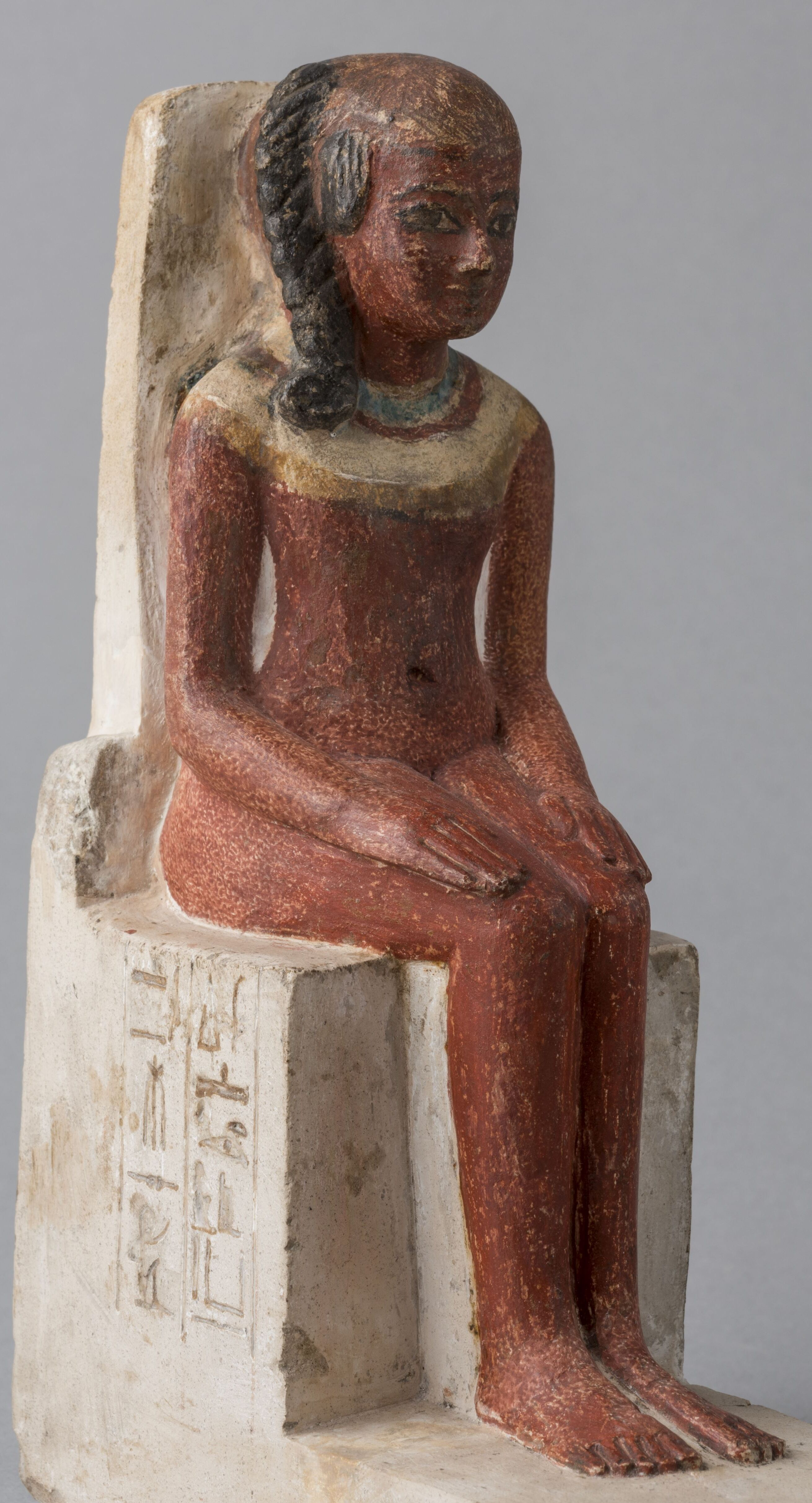
Statue of a child, depicted naked with the sidelock of youth. 18th Dynasty (New Kingdom), 1480–1390 BC. Museo Egizio, Turin (Cat. 3093)

The name "sidelock of youth" is not entirely accurate, since it is usually a braid rather than a lock, with its end twisted into a spiral. In Middle Kingdom depictions, the end is rolled to the front.

The sidelock was generally worn on the right. In reliefs it can be depicted on the left or the right, since otherwise the lock would not be visible on a figure in profile facing left. A strand of hair was separated off from the side of the skull, itself further separated into three individual braids. The braided portion was held in place by a clasp at its point of origin.

Thereafter there were several different possibilities, such as the triple braided sidelock, whose three strands converged in a spiral. Only in a few cases was it gathered with a clasp at its point of origin and ended with a spiral but left as a loose lock of hair in between.

Further types of divine sidelock are also known. The Horus lock, like the sidelock, was braided from three strands of hair, which seem to terminate in a claw-like shape and are connected with the goddess Mafdet in Egyptian mythology.

== Mythological significance ==
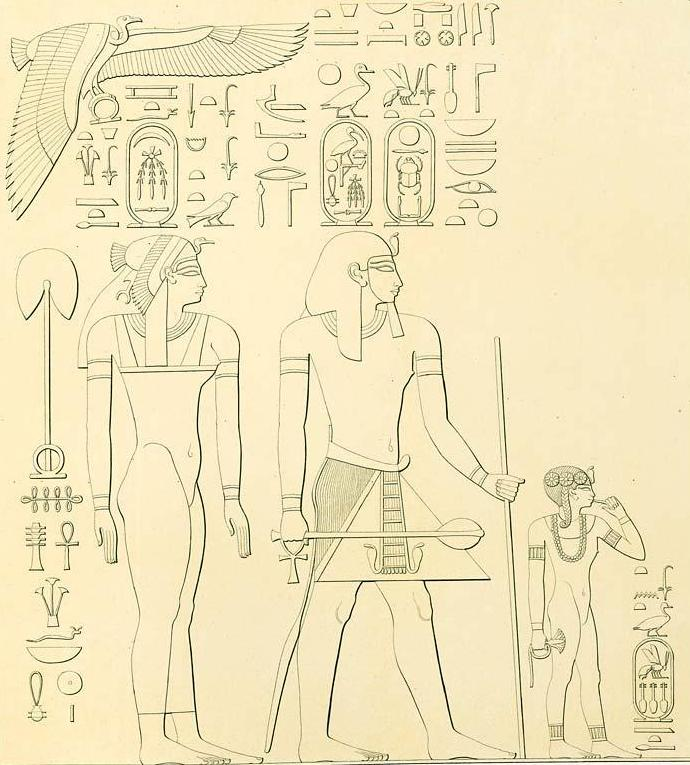
Neferubity (sister of Hatshepsut) as a child with the sidelock of youth

The sidelock of youth was used by the children of the pharaohs, not only to show them to be children, but also to indicate their connection to the youthful Horus. Like them, the young Horus had worn the sidelock as the heir apparent of his father Osiris.

In accordance with the mythological precedent, the children of the king, as his designated heirs, received the Horus lock as an indication of the special duties that were bound up with that status. In iconography, royal children were depicted naked and sucking on their finger, with their heads shaved entirely bald except for the sidelock.

Amenhotep I, as well as Thutmoses III, reused the special form of the Middle Kingdom, which is connected with their revival of the imagery of the Middle Kingdom more generally. Again in the Late Period, the Middle Kingdom depiction of the sidelock was revived.

With the beginning of the New Kingdom, the lock of youth achieved central significance as a special symbol of the princes and princesses of the 18th Dynasty. Particularly notable is the connection of the lock of youth with princesses, who as children of the reigning king were also seen as probable heirs and therefore were also depicted with the Horus lock.

== See also ==
- Payot

== Bibliography ==
- Erika Feucht. Das Kind im Alten Ägypten - Die Stellung des Kindes in Familie und Gesellschaft nach altägyptischen Texten und Darstellungen. Campus, Frankfurt/Main 1995, ISBN 3-593-35277-X.
- Victorine von Gonzenbach. Untersuchungen zu den Knabenweihen im Isiskult der römischen Kaiserzeit. Rudolf Habelt, Bonn 1957.
- Rolf Gundlach, Matthias Rochholz. Ägyptische Tempel. Gerstenberg, Hildesheim 1994, ISBN 3-8067-8131-1.
