= The Bees =

The Bees may refer to:

== Sports ==
- Barnet F.C., an English football club
- Boston Bees, the 1936–1941 name of the Boston (later Atlanta) Braves Major League Baseball franchise
- Bracknell Bees, an English ice hockey team
- Brentford F.C., an English football club
- Burlington Bees, a Class A minor league baseball team
- Coventry Bees, an English motorcycle speedway team
- New Britain Bees, a baseball team
- Salt Lake Bees, a minor league baseball team of the Pacific Coast League
- Werribee Football Club, an Australian rules football club often unofficially referred to as the Bees

== Bands ==
- The Bees (English band), an indie group from the Isle of Wight, known in the US as A Band of Bees
- The Bees (American band), a 1960s garage rock band
- The Silver Seas, a Nashville band formerly called The Bees

== Other uses ==
- The Bees Army, an opposition movement in Saudi Arabia.
- The Bees (film), the 1978 film
- Las Abejas, a Mexican pacifist civil society organization
- The Bees, a collection of writings associated with the Sarmoung Brotherhood, a Sufi order
- The Bees (novel), a 2014 novel by Laline Paull

== See also ==
- Bob Bees (born 1972), American football player
- Bee (disambiguation)
