= Be =

BE or be may refer to:

== Linguistics ==
- Be (Cyrillic), a letter of the Cyrillic alphabet
- be (interjection), in several languages
- Be (kana), in syllabic Japanese script
- Be languages or Ong Be, a pair of languages of northern Hainan province, China
- Belarusian language, ISO 639-1 code: be
- Black English, or African-American Vernacular English, an English dialect
- British English, abbr. BE, usually used in contrast to AE (American English)
- To be, the English copular verb

== Music ==
=== Albums ===
- Be (Beady Eye album), 2013
- Be (Casiopea album), 1998
- Be (Common album), 2005
- BE (Pain of Salvation album), 2004
  - BE (Original Stage Production), a 2005 live album by Pain of Salvation
- Be (BTS album), 2020

=== Songs ===
- "Be", a song by Neil Diamond from the 1973 soundtrack Jonathan Livingston Seagull
- "Be", a song by Jessica Simpson from In This Skin
- "Be", a song by Lenny Kravitz from Let Love Rule
- "Be", a song by Slade from Whatever Happened to Slade

== Organisations ==
- Be Inc., a former US software company (1990–2001) and developer of the Be Operating System (BeOS)
- Be Unlimited, a former UK Internet service provider (2003–2014)
- Badminton Europe, the governing body of badminton in Europe
- British Eventing, the British governing body for the equestrian sport of eventing
- BearingPoint (former stock ticker symbol BE)
- Bloco de Esquerda or Left Bloc, a Portuguese political party
- Bob Evans Restaurants, an American restaurant chain
- Bloom Energy, NYSE ticker symbol BE

== Places ==
- Bè, a neighborhood in Togo
- Belgium (ISO 3166-1 and FIPS 10-4 country code: BE)
- Berlin, a state of Germany (ISO 3166 code: DE-BE)
- Bermuda (World Meteorological Organization territory code: BE)
- Canton of Bern, a canton of Switzerland (ISO 3166 code: CH-BE)
- Lampung (vehicle registration prefix BE)

== Science and technology ==
=== Computing ===
- .be, the country code top-level domain for Belgium
- Backup Exec, backup and recovery software from Veritas Software
- Big-endian, a system that stores the most significant byte of a word at the smallest memory address
- BeOS, an operating system by Be

=== Physics ===
- Baumé scale (°Bé), a density scale
- Be star, in astronomy, a B-type star
- Bejan number (Be), in thermodynamics and fluid mechanics

=== Other uses in science and technology ===
- Base excess (BE), excess or deficit in the amount of base in the blood
- Beryllium, symbol Be, a chemical element

== Transportation ==
- BE Be Electric, Electric Car Manufacturing Company
- Baltimore and Eastern Railroad Company (B&E), US
- Beriev (design office prefix: Be), a Russian aircraft manufacturer
- Blue Engines (prefix: BE), the rocket engines from Blue Origin
- BE, then IATA code of Flybe (2022–2023), former English airline
- BE, then IATA code of Flybe (1979–2020), former English airline
- BE, then IATA code of British European Airways (1946–1974), former British airline
- BE, Indian Railways station code of Bareilly Junction railway station, Uttar Pradesh, India
- Lampung (vehicle registration prefix BE)

== Other uses ==
- Bé (footballer), Portuguese footballer
- Bachelor of Engineering, an academic degree
- Bahá'í Era, in timekeeping
- Buddhist Era, in timekeeping

== See also ==
- B (disambiguation)
- Bay (disambiguation)
- BBE (disambiguation)
- Bebe (disambiguation)
- Bee (disambiguation)
