= Wadjmose =

- Prince of Egypt
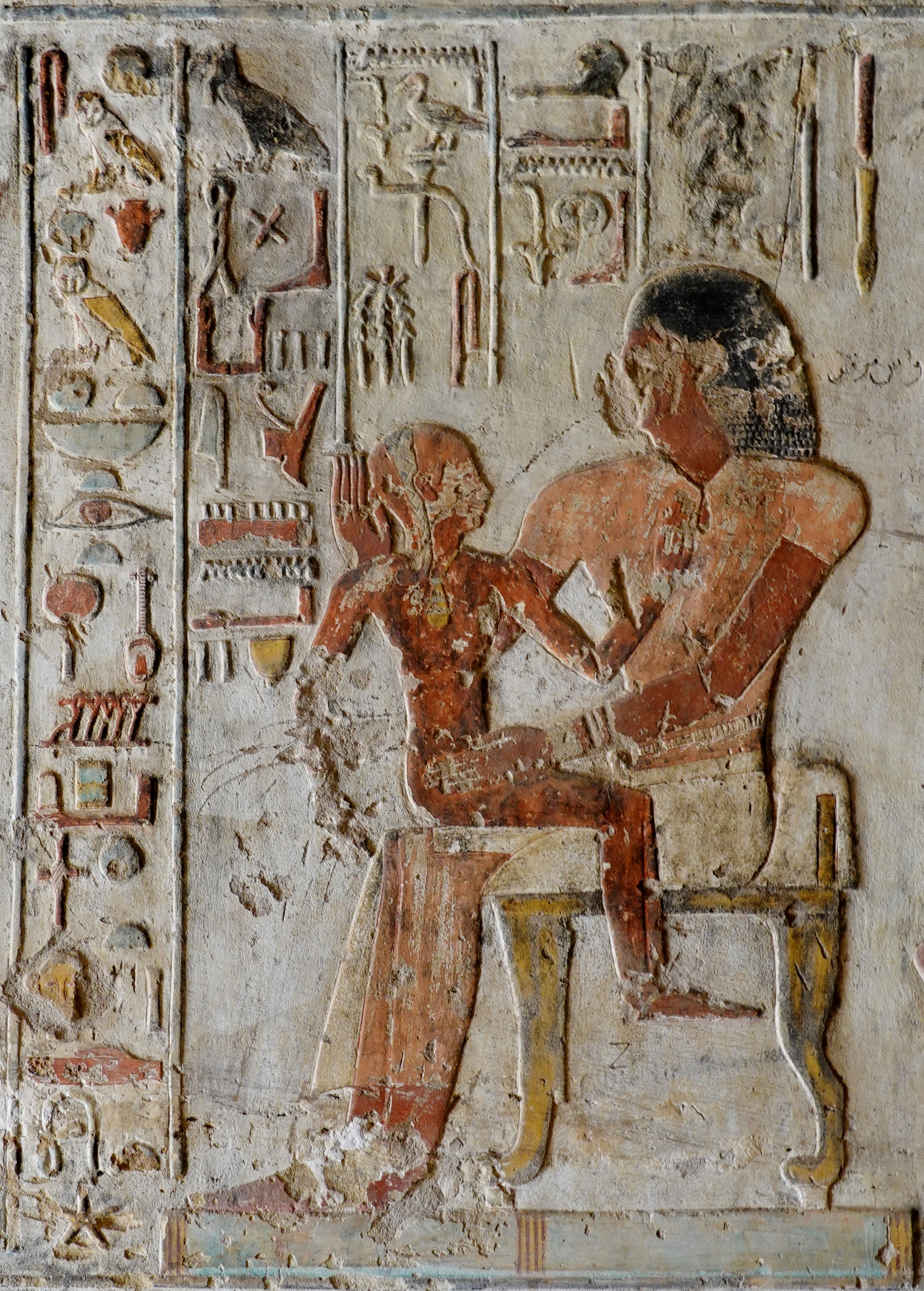
- Prince Wadjmose seated on the lap of his tutor Paheri
Egyptian name
M14 F31 S29W3ḏ ms
- Dynasty: 18th dynasty
- Father: Thutmose I
- Mother: Uncertain, Mutnofret or Ahmose

Wadjmose was an ancient Egyptian prince of the 18th Dynasty; a son of Pharaoh Thutmose I.

== Biography ==
He is likely to have been born a few years before his father ascended the throne. He had a brother named Amenmose; it is disputed who their mother was. If they were born to Queen Ahmose, they were full brothers of Hatshepsut and Neferubity. On the other hand, Wadjmose may have been the son of Queen Mutnofret and thus a full brother of Thutmose II.

Wadjmose is depicted in the El Kab tomb of himself and Amenmose's tutor Paheri, as sitting on Paheri's lap. He is thought to have predeceased his father. Wadjmose and another prince named Ramose were mentioned in the Theban funerary chapel of Thutmose I where Queen Mutnofret is also included. This chapel may have been erected during the reign of Thutmose II between the places where later the mortuary temple of Thutmose IV and the Ramesseum were built. A statue of Mutnofret was found here, making it likely that she was his mother.

Wadjmose's name occurs written in a cartouche, which is quite rare for princes.
