= Quiz Kids (magazine) =

British children's magazine

- Cover of the 100th issue of Quiz Kids
- Categories: Children's, puzzle
- Frequency: 2 Months
- Founded: 1987
- First issue: 1987
- Final issue: 2023
- Company: Puzzler Media
- Country: United Kingdom
- Based in: Bromley
- Language: English
- OCLC: 60741424

Quiz Kids (sometimes Puzzler Quiz Kids) is a defunct children's puzzle magazine owned by Puzzler Media. Publishing from 1987 to 2023, it is the longest-running magazine of its genre. Based in the Bromley, UK, each issue consisted of 100 challenges including crosswords, dot-to-dots, spot the differences, word searches, jokes and various other tasks created for children aged 7–12. The magazine also came with a free pen or a pencil attached to the front cover. The puzzles were created specially for the magazine, in line with the guidelines of the UK's National Curriculum. As of 2015 Quiz Kids is published every 2nd Month. It was also published in New Zealand.

In March 2023, Puzzler rebranded the magazine to Puzzler Kids' Collection in attempts to create a magazine that is "far more attractive to the younger generation".

== Characters ==
The five principal characters as they appeared in 1994. Left to right: Streetwise, Bee, Paws, Simon, Mutt.

The plots in Quiz Kids centre around the adventures of five main characters: Bee (a girl), Simon (a boy), Mutt (a dog), Paws (a cat) and Streetwise (a mouse). In each issue, the Quizkids team embark on a new adventure, and must use their puzzle-solving skills to achieve their goals.

Secondary characters who occasionally feature in the magazine to help the Quizkids include Tom Boffin (Bee and Simon's uncle), and Spider and Dewie (a junior reporter and junior photographer respectively, who work for the newspaper Scoop!).

== Book ==
A companion book, The Puzzler Quiz Kids Adventures was released by Carlton Books in May 2006. The book comprised five Quiz Kids stories: "Jungle Adventure", "Quiz Kids and the Black Shark", "Animal Farm Adventure", "Quiz Kids Adventure Camp" and "Quiz Kids Funfair Adventure".
