= Amherst Bee =

- Type: Weekly newspaper
- Format: Tabloid
- Owner: Bee Group Newspapers
- Founder: Adam Lorenzo Rinewalt (1849–1902)
- Publisher: Trey Measer
- Editor: Bob Kupczyk
- Founded: 1879
- Language: American English
- Headquarters: 5564 Main Street; Village of Williamsville
- City: Williamsville
- Country: United States
- Circulation: 27,000 (as of 2018)
- Readership: Williamsville, Buffalo
- ISSN: 1095-9432
- OCLC number: 12957674
- Website: www.amherstbee.com

The Amherst Bee is an American, English language newspaper established in 1879 which serves the Buffalo and Williamsville area of New York, and is part of the Bee Group Newspapers. It is published weekly on Wednesdays. Its estimated circulation was 27,000 in 2018.

== History ==
This newspaper was founded in 1879 by Adam Lorenzo Rinewalt. While Rinewalt was in later life deeply engaged in Republican politics, it was initially founded as an independent, nonpartisan paper. The paper quickly became the leading journal in the county, and by 1880, the paper had moved to larger facilities.

Rinewalt ran the newspaper until his suicide on October 1, 1902. The paper was taken over by Rinewalt's wife and their son, Allan S. Rinewalt, until March 1907. In 1907, the paper was sold to Frank and his brother George Measer, who had worked for the paper as foreman the two years prior. George Measer operated the paper until his death in 1965, when his son George Jr. took it over. It was during George Jr.'s tenure that the Bee Group expanded, opening multiple local papers. After George Jr.'s retirement in 1994 his son, Trey Measer, took over. Trey remains the publisher, assisted by editor Anna DeRosa.

The Amherst Bee is known for never missing an issue, including during the Blizzard of '77. The first telephone in Amherst was installed at the Amherst Bee on Main Street.
