= Ahmose (queen) =

- Queen consort of Egypt; Great Royal Wife
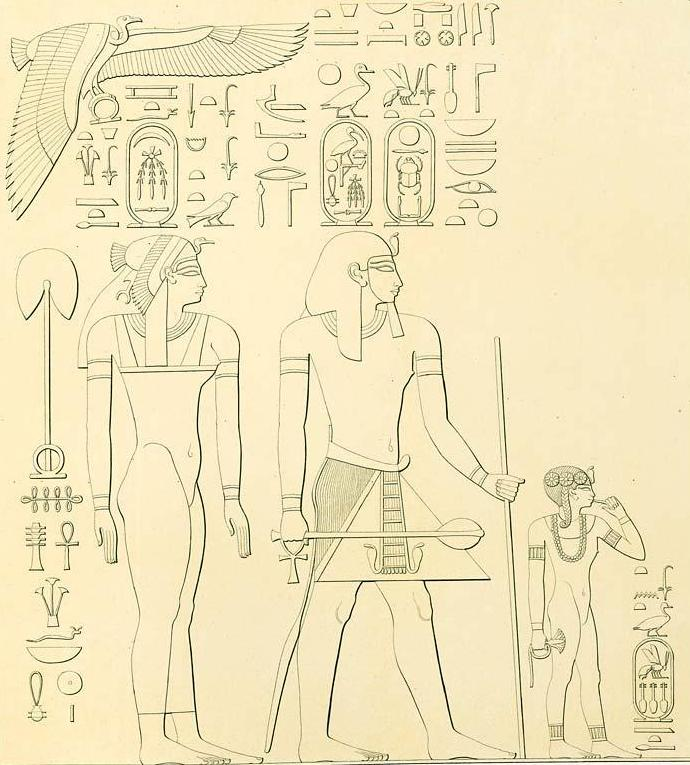
- Thutmose I and his wife Ahmose with their eldest daughter
- Born: Thebes?
- Died: Thebes
- Burial: Deir el-Bahari
- Spouse: Thutmose I
- Issue: Hatshepsut; Neferubity
Egyptian name
iaH ms O34
- Dynasty: 18th of Egypt
- Father: Amenhotep I (possibly)
- Religion: Ancient Egyptian religion

Ahmose was an Ancient Egyptian queen in the Eighteenth Dynasty. She was the Great Royal Wife of the dynasty's third pharaoh, Thutmose I, and the mother of the queen and pharaoh Hatshepsut. Her name means "Born of the Moon".

== Family ==
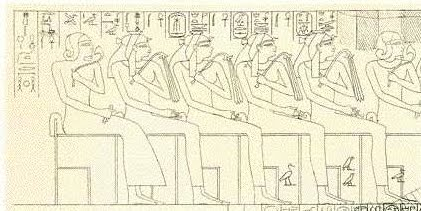
Prince Sipair, unknown royal lady, Queen Ahmose, Queen Tures and Queen Henuttamehu

It is not known who Ahmose's father and mother were. It has been suggested that Ahmose was either a daughter of pharaoh Amenhotep I or a daughter of pharaoh Ahmose I and possibly Ahmose I's sister-wife Ahmose-Nefertari. Ahmose was never called a King's Daughter. This fact creates some doubt about these theories about Ahmose's royal family connections. However, Ahmose did hold the title King's Sister. This may suggest that she was a sister of Pharaoh Thutmose I.

It has been argued that Ahmose did not hold the title "King's Daughter" because she married a non-royal and thereby lost it, and Tia, the daughter of Seti I, is cited as a comparison. Tia was not a princess by birth: as an official's daughter, she married an official, never explicitly held the title "King's Daughter," and was called "King's Sister" only during her brother's reign. Ahmose's situation, however, was entirely different: at that time there was no king who had formerly been an official and could have been her father, she was not in a position to marry a non-royal, and she was called "King's Sister" during the reign of Thutmose I. Just as Tia, here "King" refers to the reigning pharaoh, her father was Thutmose I's father, who was not a pharaoh.

Ahmose is identified with an impressive array of titles: Hereditary Princess (iryt-p`t), Great of Praises (wrt-hzwt), Mistress of Great Beloved Sweetness (nebt-bnrt-‘3(t)-mrwt), Great King’s Wife, his beloved (hmt-niswt-wrt meryt.f), Mistress of Gladness (hnwt-ndjm-ib), Lady of all Women (hnwt-hmwt-nbwt), Mistress of the Two Lands (hnwt-t3wy), Companion of Horus (zm3yt-hrw), Beloved Companion of Horus (zm3yt-hrw-mryt.f), King’s Sister (snt-niswt)

Ahmose was the Great Royal Wife of Thutmose I. She is depicted in Deir-el-Bahari and she appears there with a daughter named Neferubity. Ahmose was also the mother of the queen-pharaoh Hatshepsut. It is not known with certainty whether Princes Amenmose and Wadjmose were her sons. They are generally thought to be the sons of Queen Mutnofret, another wife of Thutmose I.

== Monuments and inscriptions ==
An official named Yuf served as the second prophet of the dues (S'w) of the altar, the doorkeeper of the temple, and as a priest. He also served several royal women. He first served queen Ahhotep, the mother of pharaoh Ahmose I, he was responsible for repairing the disturbed tomb of Queen Sobekemsaf, and eventually served Queen Ahmose. Yuf recorded that Queen Ahmose appointed him as assistant treasurer and entrusted him with the service to a statue of her majesty

Ahmose features prominently in the divine conception scenes. Hatshepsut had scenes created showing how the god Amun approached her mother, Ahmose, and how she (Hatshepsut) was of divine birth. The inscriptions show how the god Thoth first mentions Queen Ahmose to Amun. "Ahmose is her name, the beneficent, mistress of [--], She is the wife of the king Aakheperkare (Thutmose I), given life forever" (from Breasted's Ancient Records). The god Amun then proceeds to the palace and makes himself known to the Queen. They proceed to conceive a child and Amun declares that she should be named Khnemet-Amun-Hatshepsut. Amun proceeds to the god Khnum and instructs him to create Hatshepsut. The scenes continue to show the confinement of the queen and the birth of her divine daughter.

Many years later Pharaoh Amenhotep III copied these scenes almost exactly to show how Amun visited his mother, Queen Mutemwiya, and conceived the royal prince.

== See also ==
- Media related to Ahmose, queen at Wikimedia Commons
