= Saint Bee =

Saint Bee may refer to:

- Saint Begga (615–693), daughter of Pepin of Landen, mayor of the palace of Austrasia
- Saint Bega, Dark Ages saint of what is now north-west England
