= The Newtown Bee =

Newspaper published in Newtown, CT

- Type: Weekly newspaper
- Format: Broadsheet
- Founder: John T. Pearce
- Founded: June 1877
- Language: English
- Headquarters: 5 Church Hill Road, Newtown, Connecticut
- Country: United States
- Website: newtownbee.com

The Newtown Bee is a weekly newspaper for Newtown, Connecticut. Founded by John T. Pearce in 1877, the Bee has been published continuously by the Smith family. The Bee is owned by Bee Publishing Company. The company also publishes Antiques and the Arts Weekly.

In 1991 architect Roger P. Ferris of Southport, Connecticut designed a new printing plant for Bee Publishing,. The building has a fieldstone base and cedar shingle walls and roof designed to fit in with Newtown's historic look.

On April 2, 2020, publisher R. Scudder Smith announced that the newspaper would suspend print publications temporarily in response to the COVID-19 pandemic to protect its employees. Online publication would continue with a reduced staff. Print production resumed with the edition of June 5, 2021.
