= BEE Japan =

Nonprofit organization

BEE Japan (Bicycle for Everyone's Earth) is a nonprofit organization that promotes environmental awareness and ecological lifestyles in Japan. Founded in 1997 by a group of JET Assistant Language Teachers, the organization's main event is an annual 2 month bicycle ride, beginning in August, from the northernmost island of Japan (Hokkaido) to the southernmost (Kyushu, and occasionally Okinawa). Each year has a different coordinator and team of riders, and a different environmental focus.

The BEE ride uses both direct action and education to promote environmental awareness and ecological lifestyles.

== Past rides ==
- 2011: Planned to support Japan For Sustainability, but was cancelled due to the 2011 Tōhoku earthquake
- 2010: All proceeds went to Japan For Sustainability
- 2009: Ride from Wakkanaito Okinawa in support of Japan For Sustainability and We 21 Japan
- 2008: Ride from Wakkanai to Cape Sata
- 2007: Supporting organizations against the Rokkasho Reprocessing Plant
- 2006: Wakkanai to Okinawa supporting a charity opposed to the relocation of a US Marine Corps base, which threatened the endangered dugong
- 2005: 3200km ride over 52 days
- 1998: Ride from Rishiri Island to Yakushima, including a visit to Rokkasho
- 1997: Ride from Wakkanai to Yakushima over 2 months
