= Be2 =

Matchmaking service

be2
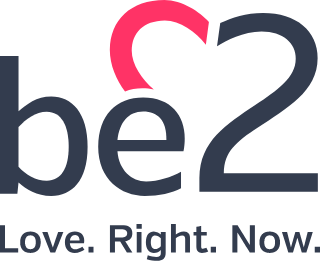
- Type: LLC
- Founded: 2004
- Founders: Robert Wuttke, Andreas Etten
- Headquarters: Armenia
- Owner: be2 LLC
- Number of employees: 180 (2010)
- Website: be2.com

Be2 is a matchmaking service in 37 countries.

== History ==
be2 was founded as a German matchmaking service in 2004 by online entrepreneur Robert Wuttke and Andreas Etten. It went live on April 1, 2004. The same year, the Spanish and Italian services were added.

== Controversies ==
The journalist Troels Jørgensen from TV station DR has rated be2's matching system as flawed. Wildly different profiles were matched to exactly the same potential partners in a test performed for consumer rights programme Kontant. Also, membership is extended without consent which is illegal according to The Danish Consumer Council. This is also illegal in Sweden according to the Swedish Consumer Council. All the questions raised by the Danish journalist in the programme have since been addressed by the company. be2 made several changes to its service in Denmark in response to the programme.
