= Bee Group Newspapers =

Family of newspapers published in Western New York, U.S.

Bee Group Newspapers are a family of suburban newspapers published in Western New York by Bee Publishing, Incorporated, of Williamsville. The forerunner of the corporation began in 1877 with the founding of the Lancaster Bee. Bee Group Newspapers publishes newspapers for Erie County, New York, targeting towns, villages, and school districts. The weekly readership is 175,672. All papers include local government news, their award-winning classified sections, and special themed sections produced throughout the year. Bee Group Newspapers are members of the New York Press Association and the National Newspaper Association. All Bee newspapers are available in newsstands throughout the towns they report on - whether they are free or not depends on which paper it is. All of the papers are also mail-delivered weekly to paid subscribers.

In November 2024, the Measer family sold the business to Sample News Group.

== Individual Newspapers ==
=== Lancaster Bee ===
The Lancaster Bee serves Lancaster, New York. It was founded February 8, 1878, as the Lancaster Star by with Paul Bussmaan and William B. Fuller as editors and publishers. A month later. Fuller assumed the entire ownership, and a year later, publication was discontinued. On May 26. 1880, E. R. Vaughn and P.J. Gaudy issued the first edition of the Lancaster Times, and in 1885, Adam L. Rinewalt, then publisher of the Amherst Bee, took over the ownership of the Lancaster paper. Later in the same year the publication was sold to Marvin L. Reist (1862–1908), who published it until 1907, when it was sold to W. C. Naylor of Olean, New York.

=== Amherst Bee ===
Founded in 1879 in Williamsville, New York, by Adam Lorenzo Rinewalt (1849–1902), who edited it until shortly before his death. It is the flagship paper of Bee Group Newspapers and is published weekly on Thursday. The Amherst Bee is free at over 150 locations in Amherst, New York. Amherst Bee celebrated their 125th year of publication in 2004.

=== Depew Bee ===
Serving Depew, it was founded in 1893. It is published every Thursday.

=== Clarence Bee ===
Has served Clarence since 1937. It is published every Thursday.

=== Ken-Ton Bee ===
The Ken-ton Bee serves the village of Kenmore and the town of Tonawanda, New York, was founded in 1982. It is published every Thursday.

=== Cheektowaga Bee ===
The Cheektoaga Bee serves Cheektowaga. It was founded in 1977.

=== Southtowns Bee publication ===
West Seneca Bee, serving West Seneca, was founded in 1980. It is published every Thursday.

Orchard Park Bee, serving the Orchard Park, was founded in 1986. It is published every Thursday.

East Aurora Bee, serving East Aurora and Elma, was founded in 1987. It is published every Thursday.

At the end of 2025, the three papers, East Aurora, Orchard Park and West Seneca, combined into one larger publication. Justin Sullivan and Eric Keppeler were named co-editors of the publication.
