= Mutnofret =

Ancient Egyptian queen of 18th Dynasty of Egypt

X1 G15 nfr f&r&t
Mutnofret
in hieroglyphs
Era: New Kingdom
(1550–1069 BC)

Mutnofret ("Mut is Beautiful"), also rendered as Mutneferet or Mutnefert, was a queen during the Eighteenth Dynasty of Egypt. She was a secondary wife of Thutmose I and the mother of his successor Thutmose II; Thutmose I's chief wife, however, was Queen Ahmose, the mother of Hatshepsut.

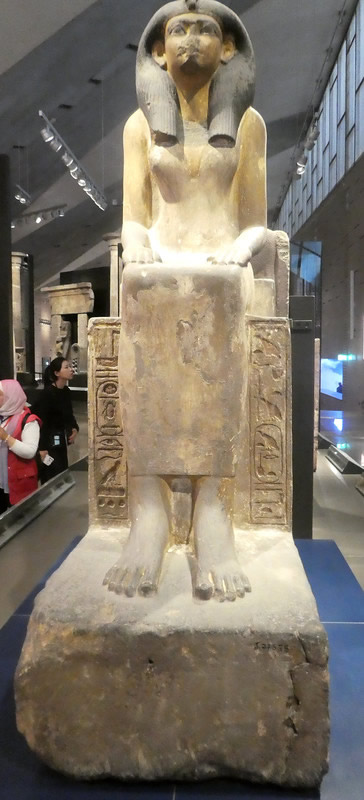
Statue of Mutnofret

Based on her title of King's Daughter, she is likely to have been a daughter of Ahmose I and a sister of Amenhotep I, who married the latter's successor Thutmose I. It is possible that she was also the mother of Thutmose I's other sons, Amenmose and Wadjmose. The connection of Thutmose I and Thutmose II to the earlier kings Ahmose and Amenhotep I (and also the mother of Wadjmose and Amenmose) was conjectured to have been Queen Ahmose in older and sometimes even current literature. However, the absence of the title King's Daughter among the titles of Queen Ahmose has been considered decisive in indicating she was not the daughter of an earlier king, and owed her primacy to being the sister (as indicated by her title King's Sister) of the new king Thutmose I, himself the son of non-reigning parents: his mother Senisonbe is titled only King's Mother. The admittedly rare attestation of the title King's Daughter for Mutnofret suggests it was she, not Queen Ahmose, who connected their husband Thutmose I to his immediate predecessors.

Mutnofret was depicted in the Deir el-Bahri temple built by her grandson Thutmose III; on a stela found at the Ramesseum; on the colossus of her son; and a statue of her bearing a dedication by Thutmose II was found in Wadjmose's chapel. This suggests that Mutnofret was still alive during her son's reign.

== Bibliography ==
- Dodson, Aidan, and Dyan Hilton, The Complete Royal Families of Ancient Egypt, Thames & Hudson, 2004. ISBN 0-500-05128-3
- Gauthier, Henri, Livre des rois d'Égypte, vol. 2, Cairo 1912.
- Robins, Gay, Review of Michel Gitton, Les Divines Épouses de la 18e dynastie, Journal of Egyptian Archaeology 73 (1987) 272-276.
- Roehring, Catherine, et al. (eds.), Hatshepsut: from Queen to Pharaoh, New York, 2005.
- Shaw, Ian (ed.), The Oxford History of Ancient Egypt, Oxford, 2000.
- Tyldesley, Joyce, Hatshepsur: The Female Pharaoh, Penguin Books, 1998. ISBN 0-14-024464-6
