= BBE =

BBE may refer to:

== Arts and media ==
- B.B.E., a French trance music group
- "BBE" (song), a 2024 song by Italian rapper Anna
- Bad Boy Entertainment, an American hip hop and R&B record label
- Barely Breaking Even, a British record label
- Bible in Basic English, a 1949 translation of the Bible

== Places in the United States ==
- Baldwin Beach Express, a highway in Alabama
- Belgrade-Brooten-Elrosa School District, Minnesota

== Other uses ==
- Bangba language, spoken in DR Congo (ISO 639-3:bbe)
- Barako Bull Energy, a Philippine basketball team
- Bickerstaff brainstem encephalitis, a rare disease
- Bijzondere Bijstands Eenheid, a Dutch special forces unit
