= Bee (hieroglyph) =

Egyptian hieroglyph

Base of "Funerary Cone", with details of hieroglyphs. (clay)

The Egyptian hieroglyph representing a honey bee (𓆤 Gardiner L2). It is used as an ideogram for "bee" (bjt), but most frequently as part of the title of the King of Upper and Lower Egypt, rendered nswt-bjtj (interpreted as "He of the Sedge and the Bee").

== See also ==
- Gardiner's Sign List#L. Invertebrates and lesser animals
- Egyptian biliteral signs
- Nswt-bjtj
- List of Egyptian hieroglyphs
