= Thutmose II =

Fourth Egyptian Pharaoh of the 18th Dynasty (c. 1493/1482 – 1479 BC)

- Thutmosis II; Chebron, Chebros
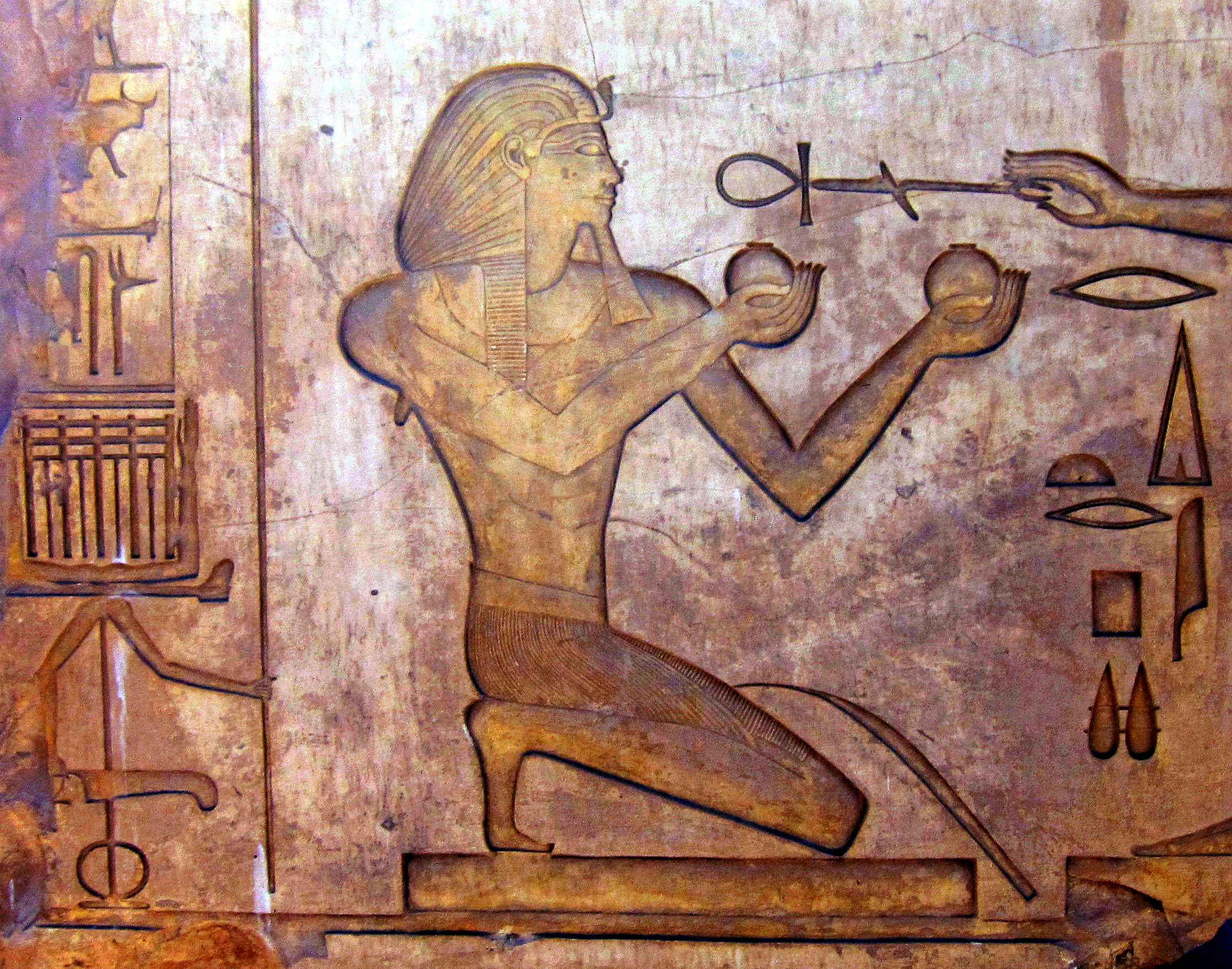
- Relief of Thutmose II from the Karnak temple complex, now at the Grand Egyptian Museum

Pharaoh
- Reign: Either 13–14 or 2–3 regnal years: 1493–1480 BC (Low Chronology); 1513–1500 BC (High Chronology); 1513–1499 BC (Helck); 1493–1479 (Grimal); 1482–1480 BC (Cooney); 1482–1479 BC (Nadig)
- Predecessor: Thutmose I
- Successor: Thutmose III
Royal titulary
Horus name
Ka nakht weser pehty
K3-nḫt-wsr-pḥty
Victorious bull, strong of might
Strong bull, rich of strength
G5	E1 D40 F12 S29 F9 F9
Nebty name
Netjeri nesyt
Nṯri-nsyt
Divine of kingship
G16	R8 M23 M17 M17 X1 Y1
Golden Horus
Sekhem kheperu
Sḫm-ḫprw
Powerful of manifestations
G8	S42 L1 G43 Y1 Z2
Prenomen
Aa kheper en re
ˁ3 ḫpr n Rˁ
The great one is the manifestation of Ra
Great is the manifestation of Ra

M23 X1 L2 X1	N5 O29 L1 N35
Nomen
Djehutymes(u)
Ḏḥwty-ms(w)
Thoth is born
Born of Thoth
G39 N5 Z1 < G26 F31 S29 >
Djehutymes Neferkhau
Ḏḥwtj-msj(w)-nfr-ḫˁw
Born of Thoth, he whose apparitions are perfect
G39 N5 Z1 < G26 F31 S29 F35 N28 Z2s >
Djehutymes Nedjty re
Ḏḥwtj-msj(w)-nḏtj-Rˁ
Thoth is born, protector of Ra
G39 N5 Z1 < N5 G26 F31 Aa27 W24 X1 Z4 >
- Consorts: Hatshepsut, Iset
- Children: Thutmose III, Neferure
- Father: Thutmose I
- Mother: Mutnofret
- Born: c. 1492 BC (or 1502 BC)
- Died: c. 1479 BC (aged approx. 13–23)
- Burial: Tomb of Thutmose II, Western Wadis (original burial); Mummy found in the Deir el-Bahari royal cache (Theban Necropolis) [disputed]
- Dynasty: 18th Dynasty

Thutmose II (also written as Thutmosis, Tuthmosis, or Thothmes in older history works in Latinized Greek; Ancient Egyptian: ḏḥwti.ms(.w): "Born of Thoth") was the fourth pharaoh of the Eighteenth Dynasty of Egypt, and his reign is thought to have lasted for 14 years, from 1493 to 1479 BC (Low Chronology), or just 3 years, from around 1482 to 1479 BC. Little is known about him, and he is overshadowed by his father Thutmose I, half-sister and wife Hatshepsut, and son Thutmose III. There are relatively few monuments that refer to Thutmose II.

He died before the age of 30, and a body claimed to be his was found in the Royal Cache above the Mortuary temple of Hatshepsut. His tomb, in the Western Wadis near the Valley of the Queens, was found in 2022 and confirmed to be his in 2025. The tomb was built under waterfalls, leading to periodic flooding, which damaged the tomb throughout the ages. His mummified body was relocated in ancient times, and its final resting place is disputed.

== Family ==
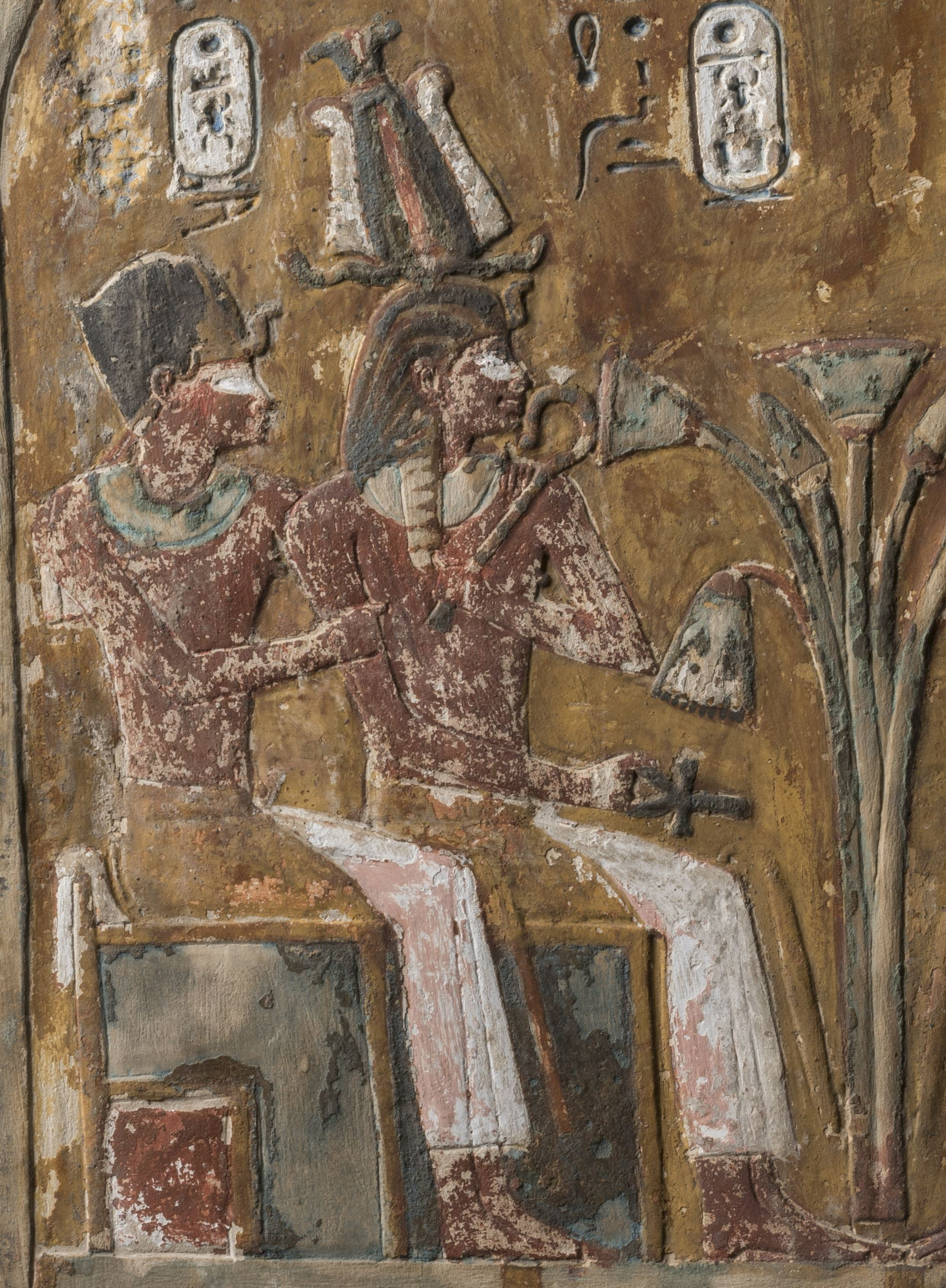
Thutmose I (right) and Thutmose II as depicted in the stela of Sennefer

The name Thutmose II is read as Thutmosis or Tuthmosis II, Thothmes in older history works in Latinized Greek, and derives from Ancient Egyptian: /ḏḥwty.ms/ Djehutymes, meaning "Thoth is born".

Thutmose II was the son of Thutmose I and his minor wife, Mutnofret, who was probably a daughter of Ahmose I. He was, therefore, a lesser son of Thutmose I and chose to marry his fully royal half-sister, Hatshepsut, in order to secure his kingship. Because Mutnofret was a princess and Thutmose I was common born, they most likely married only after Thutmose became king, hence their son would be born after his father's coronation, and probably after his half-sister Hatshepsut, who was the pharaoh's daughter by his primary wife. That would mean Thutmose II was in his early teens when he became pharaoh himself. While he successfully put down rebellions in Nubia and the Levant and defeated a group of nomadic Bedouins, these campaigns were specifically carried out by the king's generals, and not by Thutmose II himself. This is often interpreted as evidence that Thutmose II was still a minor at his accession.

Thutmose II fathered Neferure with Hatshepsut, and Thutmose III, by a lesser wife named Iset.

Some archaeologists believe that Hatshepsut was the real power behind the throne during Thutmose II's rule because of the similar domestic and foreign policies that were later pursued under her reign and because of her claim that she was her father's intended heir. She is depicted in several raised relief scenes from a Karnak gateway dating to Thutmose II's reign both together with her husband and alone. She later had herself crowned pharaoh several years into the rule of her husband's young successor Thutmose III; this is confirmed by the fact that "the queen's agents actually replaced the king's name in a few places with her own cartouches" on the gateway.

If Thutmose II had indeed been born after his father's coronation, he would either have been in his early teens (short reign) or early twenties (long reign) upon his death.

== Reign ==
=== Dates and length of reign ===
The Epitome by Manetho refers to Thutmose II as "Chebron" and credits this ruler with a reign of 13 years. The Greek name may reflect a version of the prenomen, Aakheperenre. Egyptologists debate whether Thutmose II had a short or long reign. Some suggest a short reign of three years, based on his highest attested date is Year 1, II Akhet day 8 stele. There are only a small number of surviving documents, and a minimal amount of scarabs attested to this king.

It is still possible to estimate when Thutmose II's reign would have begun by means of a heliacal rise of Sothis in Amenhotep I's reign, which would give him a reign from 1493 to 1479 BC, although uncertainty about how to interpret the rise also permits a date from 1513 to 1499 BC, and uncertainty about how long Thutmose I ruled could also potentially place his reign several years earlier still. Nonetheless, scholars in the 20th century were assigning him a reign from 1493 or 1492 to 1479.

Alternatively, Thutmose could have ruled around two or three years, from 1482 to 1480/1479 BC.

==== Argument for a short reign ====
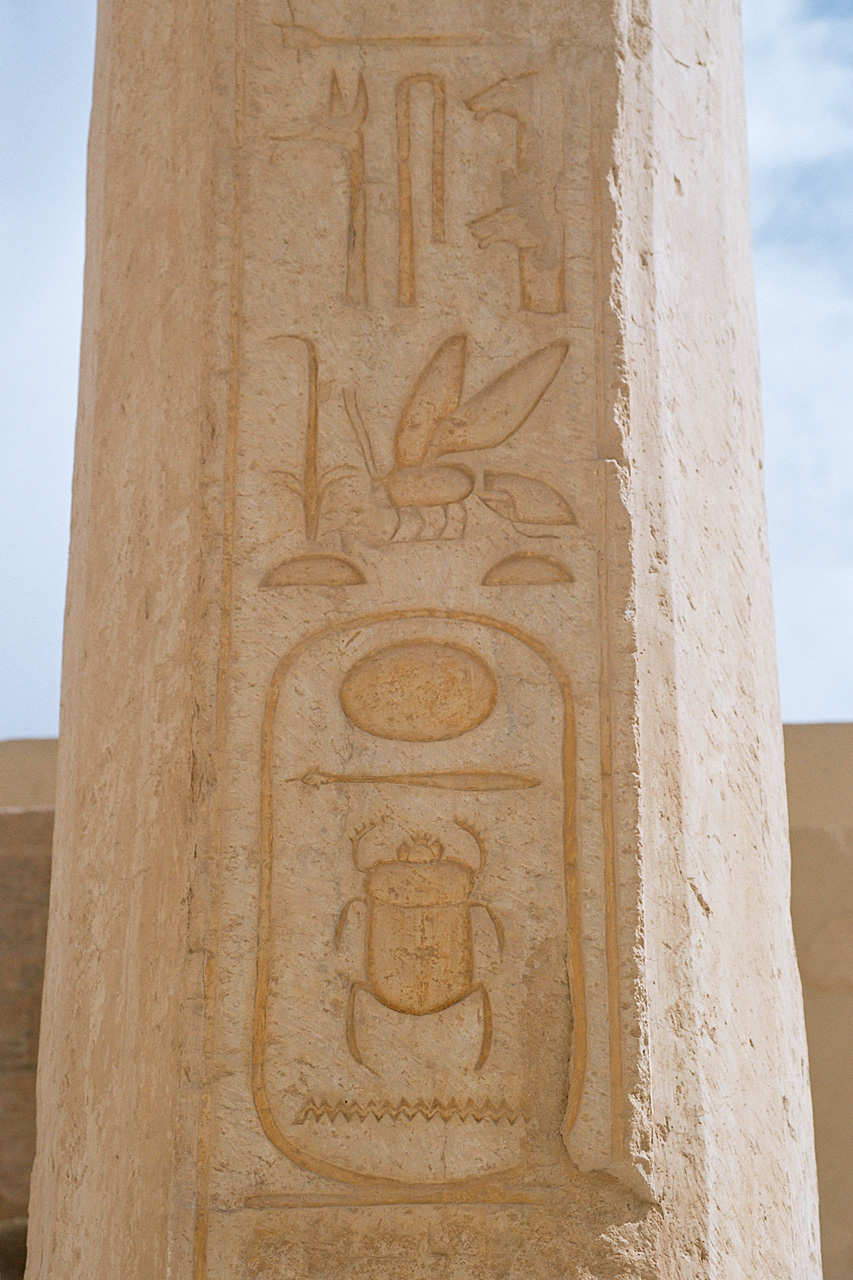
Aakheperenre, the praenomen of Thutmose II, temple of Hatshepsut, Luxor

Ineni, who was already aged by the start of Thutmose II's reign, lived through this ruler's entire reign into that of Hatshepsut. In addition, Thutmose II is poorly attested in the monumental record and in the contemporary tomb autobiographies of New Kingdom officials. A clear count of monuments from his rule, which is the principal tool for estimating a king's reign when dated documents are not available, is nearly impossible because Hatshepsut usurped most of his monuments, and Thutmose III in turn reinscribed Thutmose II's name indiscriminately over other monuments. However, apart from several surviving blocks of buildings erected by the king at Semna, Kumma, and Elephantine, Thutmose II's only major monument consists of a limestone gateway at Karnak that once lay at the front of the Fourth Pylon's forecourt. Even this monument was not completed in Thutmose II's reign but in the reign of his son Thutmose III, which hints at "the nearly ephemeral nature of Thutmose II's reign". The gateway was later dismantled and its building blocks incorporated into the foundation of the Third Pylon by Amenhotep III.

In 1987, Luc Gabolde published a study that statistically compared the number of surviving scarabs found under Thutmose I, Thutmose II and Hatshepsut. While monuments can be usurped, scarabs are so small and comparatively insignificant that altering their names would be impractical and without profit; hence, they provide a far better insight into this period. Hatshepsut's reign is believed to have lasted for 21 years and 9 months. Gabolde highlighted, in his analysis, the consistently small number of surviving scarabs known for Thutmose II compared to Thutmose I and Hatshepsut respectively; for instance, Flinders Petrie's older study of scarab seals noted 86 seals for Thutmose I, 19 seals for Thutmose II and 149 seals for Hatshepsut while more recent studies by Jaeger estimate a total of 241 seals for Thutmose I, 463 seals for Hatshepsut and only 65 seals for Thutmose II. Hence, unless there was an abnormally low number of scarabs produced under Thutmose II, this would indicate that the king's reign was rather short-lived. On this basis, Gabolde estimated Thutmose I and II's reigns to be approximately 11 and 3 full years, respectively.

Kara Cooney argues for short reign, no longer than 3 years, by judging that there were "hardly any temples with his name on them, no campaigns, no mortuary complex of any worth", and points that all known children of Thutmose II were toddlers at the time of his death, which suggests his untimely death before they could grow up.

Consequently, the reign length of Thutmose II has been a much debated subject among Egyptologists with little consensus given the small number of surviving documents for his reign.

==== Argument for a long reign ====
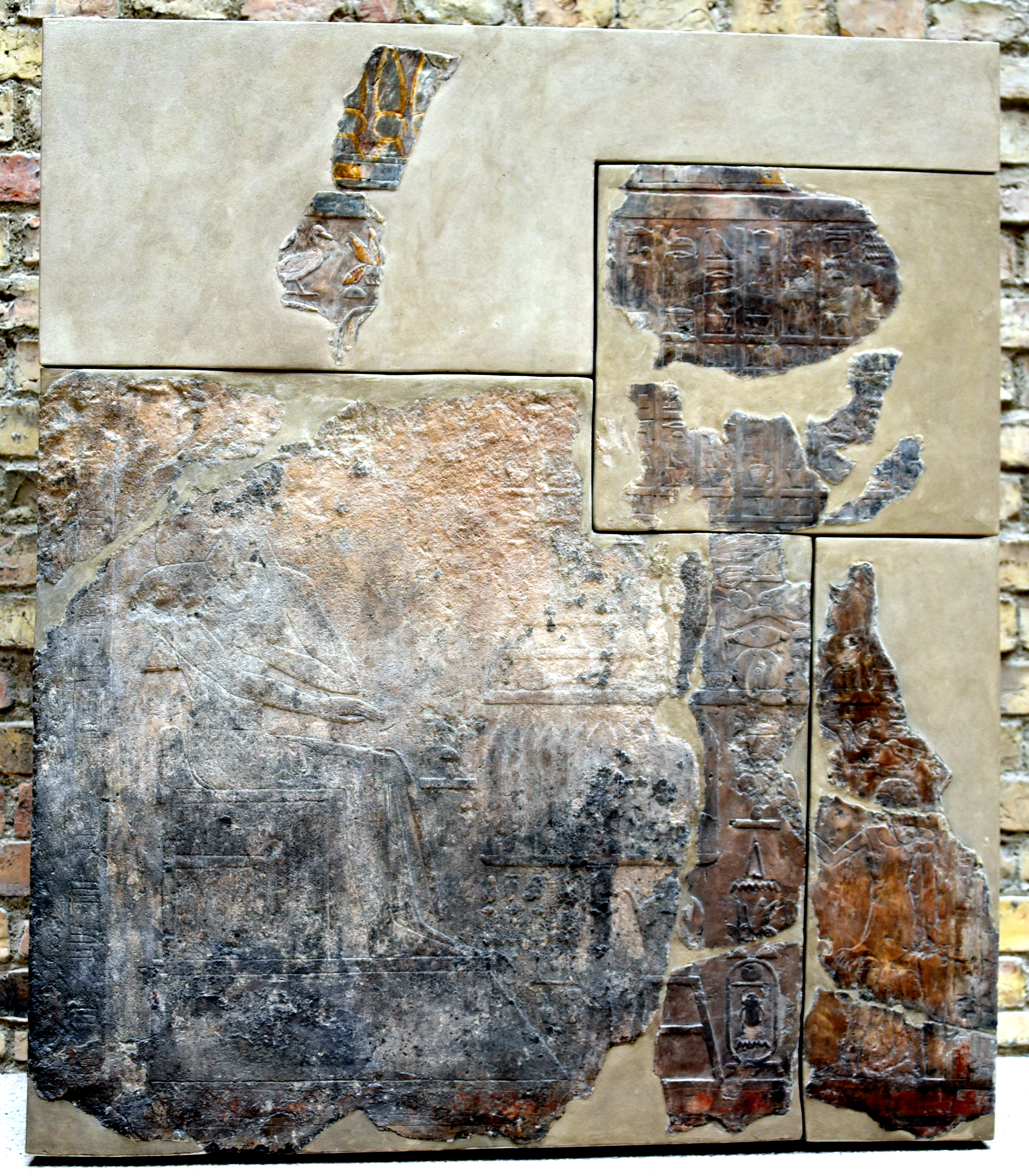
Thutmose II in front of an offering table. From the mortuary temple of Hatshepsut at Deir el-Bahari, Egypt. Neues Museum, Berlin

A depiction of the Tomb of Thutmose II

Thutmose's reign is still traditionally given as 13 or 14 years. Although Ineni's autobiography can be interpreted to say that Thutmose reigned only a short time, it also calls Thutmose II a "hawk in the nest", indicating that he was perhaps a child when he assumed the throne. Since he lived long enough to father two children—Neferure and Thutmose III—this suggests that he may have had a longer reign of 13 years in order to reach adulthood and start a family. The German Egyptologist J. Von Beckerath uses this line of argument to support the case of a 13-year reign for Thutmose II. Alan Gardiner noted that at one point a monument had been identified by Georges Daressy in 1900, dated to Thutmose's 18th year, although its precise location has not been identified. This inscription is now usually attributed to Hatshepsut, who certainly did have an 18th year. Von Beckerath observes that a Year 18 date appears in a fragmentary inscription of an Egyptian official and notes that the date likely refers to Hatshepsut's prenomen Maatkare, which had been altered from Aakheperenre Thutmose II, with the reference to the deceased Thutmose II being removed. There is also the curious fact that Hatshepsut celebrated her Sed Jubilee in her Year 16, which von Beckerath believes occurred 30 years after the death of Thutmose I, her father, who was the main source of her claim to power. This would create a gap of 13 to 14 years where Thutmose II's reign would fit in between Hatshepsut and Thutmose I's rule. However Kara Cooney proposes Hatshepsut was celebrating 30 years of her father's dynasty (11 years for Thutmose I, 3 years for Thutmose II and 16 for Thutmose III) which would suggest short reign for her husband after all.

Von Beckerath additionally stresses that Egyptologists have no conclusive criteria to statistically evaluate the reign length of Thutmose II based on the number of preserved objects from his reign.

Catherine Roerig has proposed that tomb KV20, generally believed to have been commissioned by Hatshepsut, was the original tomb of Thutmose II in the Valley of the Kings. If correct, this would be a major project on the part of Thutmose II, which required a construction period of several years and implies a long reign for this king. Secondly, new archaeological work by French Egyptologists at Karnak has produced evidence of a pylon and an opulent festival court of Thutmose II in front of the 4th pylon according to Luc Gabolde. Meanwhile, French Egyptologists at Karnak have also uncovered blocks from a chapel and a barque sanctuary constructed by Thutmose II there. Finally, Zygmunt Wysocki has proposed that the funerary temple of Hatshepsut at Deir el-Bahari was originally begun as Thutmose II's own mortuary temple. Thutmose III here later replaced depictions of Hatshepsut with those by Thutmose II in those parts of the temple that are proposed to have been executed by the latter king before Hatshepsut took over the temple following Thutmose II's death. Thutmose II also contributed to the decoration of the temple of Khnum at Semna.

A reconsideration of this new archaeological evidence would remove several arguments usually advanced in support of a short reign: namely the absence of a tomb that can be assigned to Thutmose II (prior to 2025), the absence of a funerary temple and the lack of any major works undertaken by this pharaoh. Thutmose II's Karnak building projects would also imply that his reign was closer to 13 years rather than just 3 years.

=== Military campaigns ===
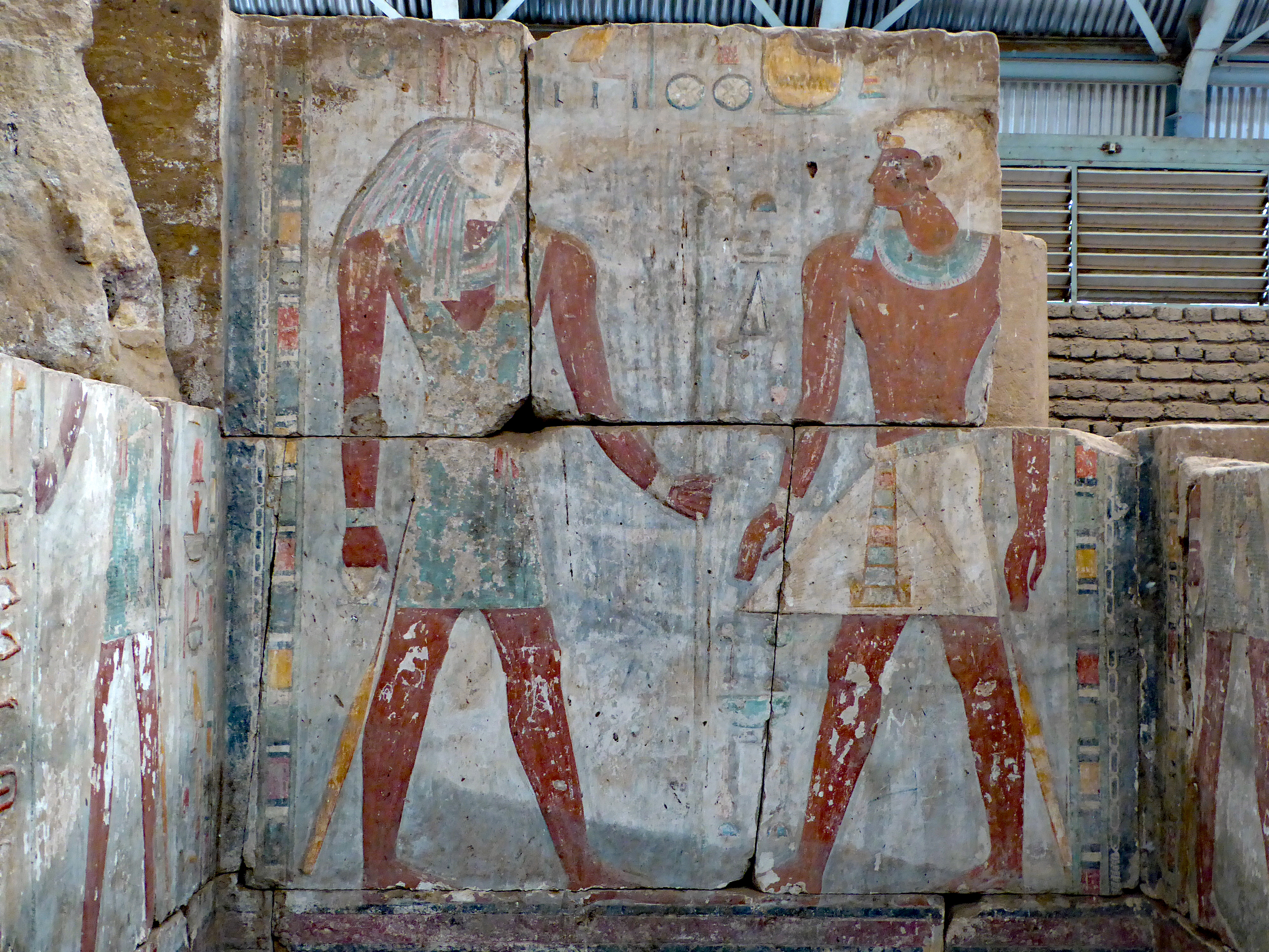
Fragment of a painted relief of Thutmose II wearing the Khat while being blessed by Horus, from the Temple of Buhen

==== The Nubian Rebellion ====
In Year 1, the Coronation of Thutmose triggered Kush to rebel, as it had the habit of doing upon the transition of Egyptian kingship. The Nubian state had been completely subjugated by Thutmose I. Rebels from Khenthennofer rose up, and the Egyptian forces retreated into a fortress built by Thutmose I. On account of his relative youth at the time, Thutmose II dispatched an army into Nubia rather than leading it himself. He seems to have easily crushed this revolt with the aid of his father's military generals. An account of the campaign is given by the historian Josephus who refers to it as the Ethiopic War.

Aswan Stela of Thutmose II summary: Kush started to conspire, making subjects of the Lord of the Two Lands (nb-tawy) to contemplate a revolt. Plundering took place behind the fortification lines built by Thutmose I to hold back revolts from the foreign lands of the tribesmen of Ta-Seti of Khent-hen-nefer. The chief (wr) to the north of Kush had started hostilities, together with two tribesmen of Ta-Seti who were the sons of the chief (wr) of Kush. The foreign lands were divided into five parts.

==== The Shashu Rebellion ====
In the Sinai, Thutmose II seems to have fought against the Shasu Bedouin in a campaign mentioned by Ahmose Pen-Nekhbet. This campaign has been called a minor raid by some scholars.

There is a fragment recorded by Kurt Sethe that records a campaign in Upper Retenu, or Syria, which appears to have reached as far as a place called Niy where Thutmose I hunted elephants after returning from crossing the Euphrates. This quite possibly indicates that the raid against the Shasu was only fought en route to Syria.

== Attestations ==
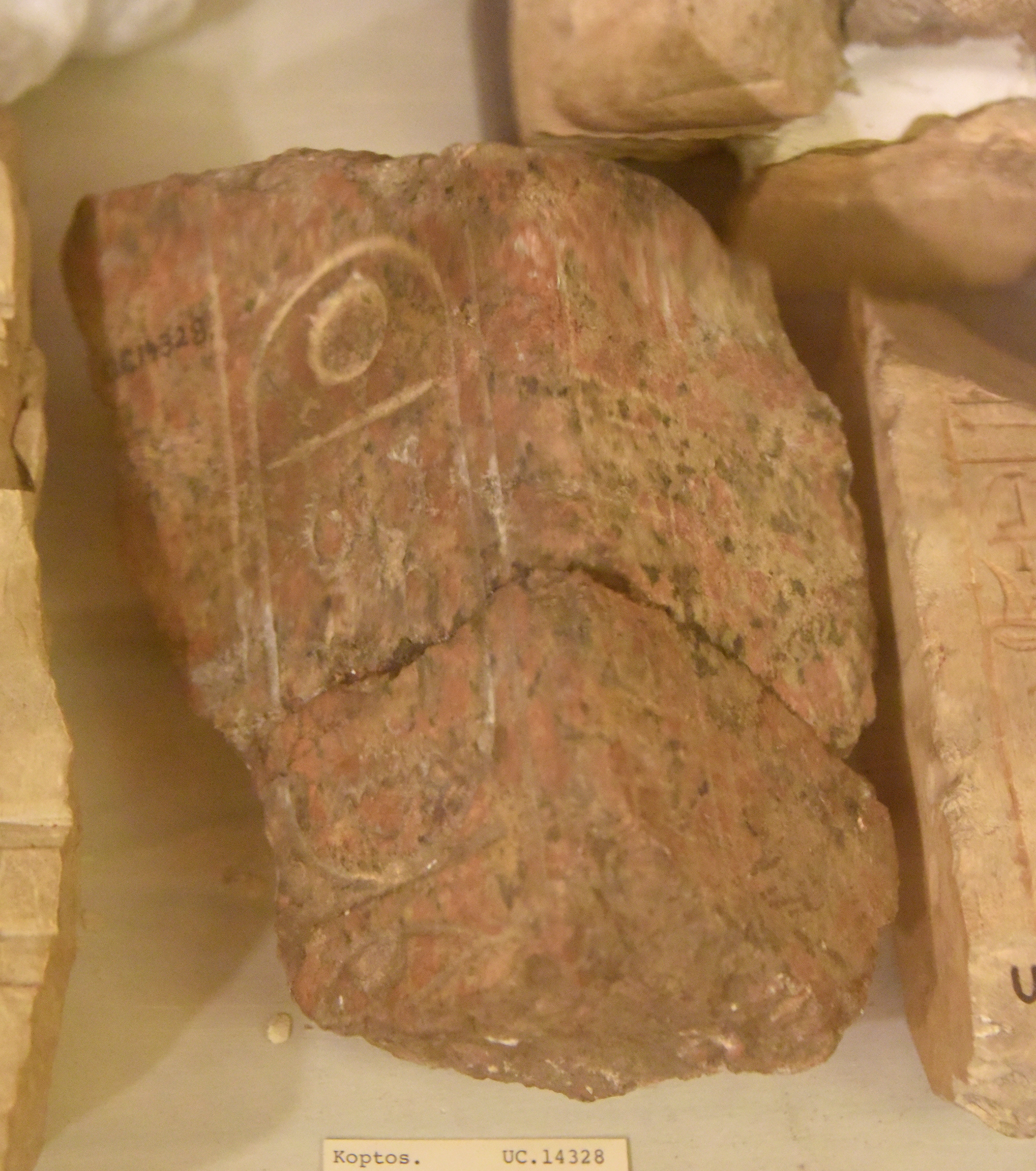
Red granite fragment bearing the cartouche of Thutmose II. Probably from a throne of a seated statue. From Thutmose III Temple at Koptos, Egypt. 18th Dynasty

There are relatively few monuments that refer to Thutmose II. One reason is that his wife and successor, Hatsheput, placed her name on monuments begun by Thutmose II. Another problem is that Thutmose III later reassigned monuments to Thutmose II.

=== Aswan Stela ===
At Aswan, the "Aswan Stela" is dated to Year 1, II Akhet 8 of Thutmose II. The monument is the highest dated attestation of the king. It records a rebellion in Upper Nubia.

=== Karnak, Gateway ===
At Karnak, Thutmose II started the construction of a limestone gateway in the forecourt in front of the Fourth Pylon at the Temple. The monument was not completed until Thutmose III. Under Amenhotep III, the gateway was dismantled and its building blocks became part of the foundation of the Third Pylon.

=== Deir el-Bahari, Stone Chest ===
Archaeologists from Warsaw University's Institute of Archaeology led by Andrzej Niwiński have discovered a treasure chest and a wooden box dated 3,500 years back in the Egyptian site of Deir el-Bahari in March 2020. The stone chest consisted of several items and all of them covered with linen canvas. Three bundles of flax were found during the excavation. A goose skeleton was found inside one of them, sacrificed for religious purposes. The second one included goose eggs. It is believed that what the third bundle contained was an ibis egg which had a symbolic meaning for the ancient Egyptians. In addition, a little wooden trinket box was discovered inside the bundle, believed to contain the name Pharaoh Thutmose II. According to the Andrzej Niwiński, "The chest itself is about 40 cm long, with a slight smaller height. It was perfectly camouflaged, looked like an ordinary stone block. Only after a closer look did it turn out to be a chest."

== Death ==
=== Burial ===
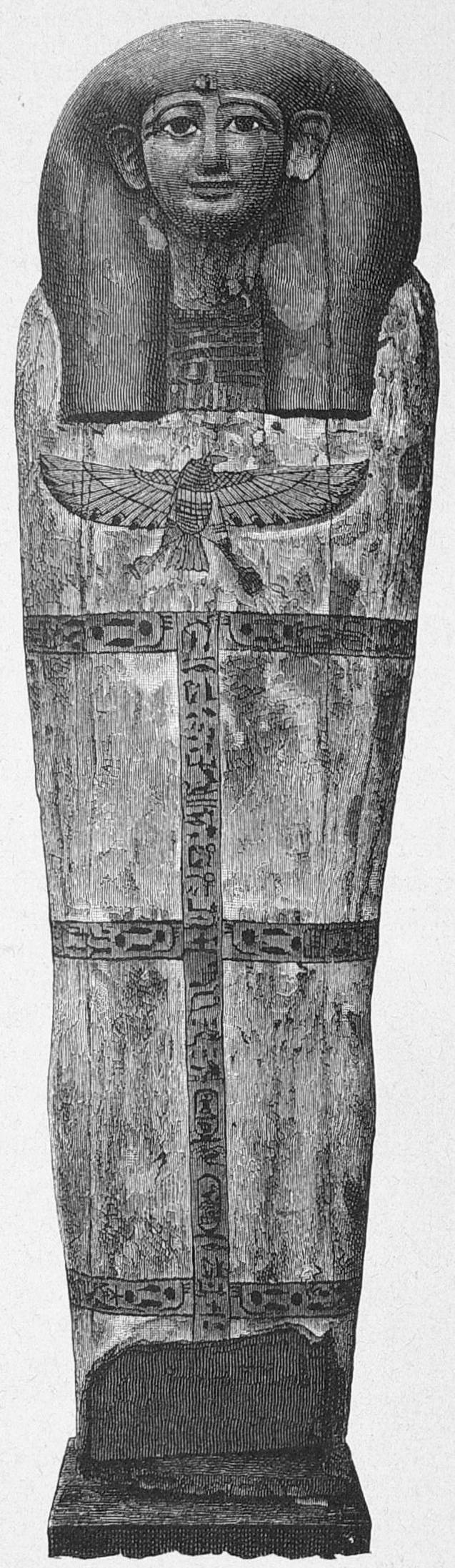
Coffin of Thutmose II

Before 2025, a variety of locations were proposed for the location of Thutmose II's tomb. It was speculated that it may have originally been KV42, but the lack of royal funerary equipment suggests the tomb was never used for burial. In 2020, a team led by Polish archeologist Andrzej Niwiński proposed a location near the Temple of Thutmose III and Temple of Hatshepsut due to the discovery of a chest bearing Thutmose's cartouche.

In 2022, a joint Egyptian-British team of the Egyptian Ministry of Tourism and Antiquities and the New Kingdom Research Foundation (affiliated to the University of Cambridge's McDonald Institute for Archaeological Research) and led by Piers Litherland uncovered a new tomb in the Western Wadis, near the Valley of the Kings. The tomb, designated C4, was believed to have been dedicated during the reign of Hatshepsut and Thutmose III. While the king's tomb was discovered in 2022, the king's purported remains were found in the Royal Cache of Mummies at Deir el-Bahari (Theban Necropolis) in 1881.

In 2025, Egyptian Egyptologists from the Egyptian Ministry of Tourism and Antiquities announced that the tomb Wadi C-4 was the tomb of Thutmose II. The tomb showed many features typical for a king's burial, such as a blue-painted ceiling with yellow stars, the remains of the funerary text known as the Amduat depicted on the walls and inscribed vessels bearing the king's name and Hatshesput's name as his great wife. Additionally, fragments of alabaster jars with the names of Thutmose II and Hatshepsut were found in the tomb which helped confirm ownership. The tomb is the first royal tomb discovered in the Theban mountain since the Tomb of Tutankhamun in 1922. The tomb was built under waterfalls, leading to periodic flash flooding which damaged the tomb throughout the ages. It's believed to have remained sealed since the Third Intermediate Period. According to the Mohamed Abdel Badie, head of the Egyptian Antiquities Sector: "The tomb is situated in a poorly-chosen place beneath two waterfalls and at the bottom of a slope down which water would have (and did) pour in the much wetter weather of the 18th dynasty." Some time after his initial burial, Thutmose II's body was moved to the Deir el-Bahari Cache, where his mummy was uncovered in the 19th century.

=== Mummy ===
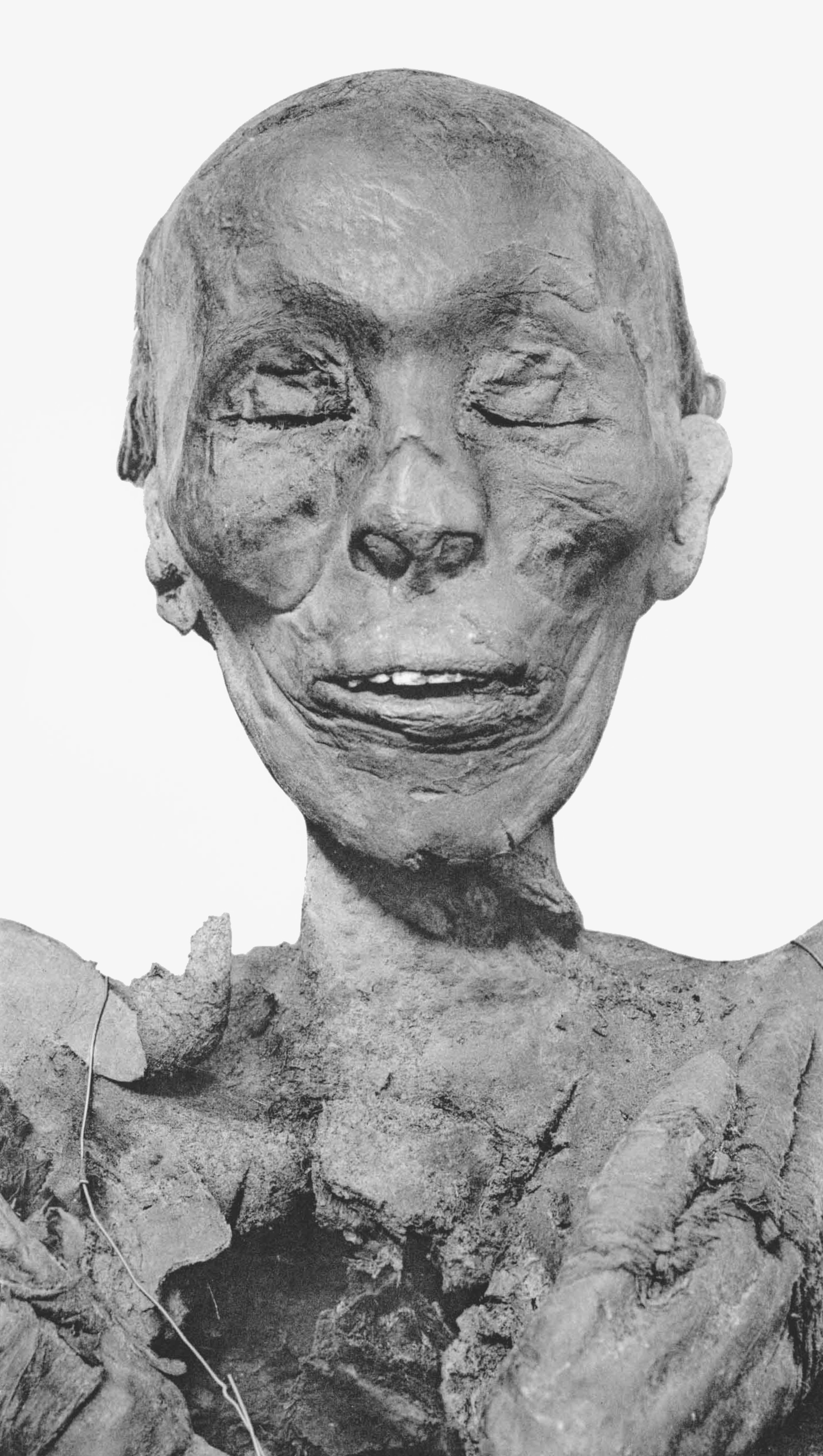
The mummified head of Thutmose II's supposed mummy

A mummy identified as Thutmose II's was discovered in the Deir el-Bahari cache, revealed in 1881. It was interred along with other 18th and 19th dynasty leaders including Ahmose I, Amenhotep I, Thutmose I, Thutmose III, Ramesses I, Seti I, Ramesses II, and Ramesses IX. It included a label that indicated it had been re-wrapped in the Twenty-first Dynasty.

The mummy was unwrapped by Gaston Maspero on 1 July 1886. There is a strong familial resemblance to the mummy of Thutmose I, his likely father, as the mummy's face and shape of the head are very similar. The body of Thutmose II suffered greatly at the hands of ancient tomb robbers, with his left arm broken off at the shoulder-joint, the forearm separated at the elbow joint, and his right arm chopped off below the elbow. His anterior abdominal wall and much of his chest had been hacked at, possibly by an axe. In addition, his right leg had been severed from his body. All of these injuries were sustained post-mortem, though the body also showed signs that Thutmose II did not have an easy life, as the following quote by Gaston Maspero attests:

He had scarcely reached the age of thirty when he fell a victim to a disease of which the process of embalming could not remove the traces. The skin is scabrous in patches, and covered with scars, while the upper part of the skull is bald; the body is thin and somewhat shrunken, and appears to have lacked vigour and muscular power.

James Harris and Fawzia Hussien (1991) conducted an X-ray survey on New Kingdom royal mummies and examined the mummified remains of Thutmose II. The results of the study determined that the mummy of Thutmose II had a craniofacial trait measurement that was common among Nubian populations.

His mummy has the inventory number CG 61066. In April 2021, this mummy was moved from the Museum of Egyptian Antiquities to the National Museum of Egyptian Civilization along with those of 17 other kings and 4 queens in an event termed the Pharaohs' Golden Parade. The identity of the mummy has been questioned in recent times. Piers Litherland who led the mission which discovered Thutmose II's tomb in February 2025 notes that Thutmose II's mummy, from the Royal Cache "has been repeatedly [been] given an age at death of 30, was labelled "Aa-en-re". Since the only king with an "en" in his name is Thutmose II, whose regnal name was "Aa-kheper-en-re", Litherland says this mummy was identified as being Thutmose II." The re-wrapping label appears to identify him as Thutmose II but it may have been modified from that of Thutmose I.

But as Litherland notes:

This is the only basis for identifying the mummy as Thutmose II. It is known that several of the mummies were mislabelled so this evidence is pretty shaky. It is only the fact that it has been repeated over and over again which has given it any weight....If his body has been found why, unlike many other kings of the New Kingdom, have his funerary goods, or fragments of his burial equipment, never been found?

== See also ==
- History of Ancient Egypt
- Family tree of the Eighteenth dynasty of Egypt
