= Temple of Esna =

Ancient Egyptian temple at Esna

Coordinates: 25.2935°N 32.5562°E

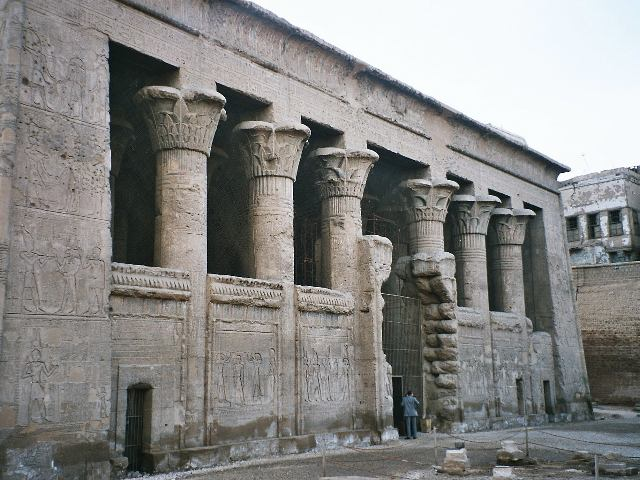
The Temple of Esna

The Temple of Esna, also known as the Temple of Khnum at Esna, is an ancient Egyptian temple in the city of Esna, about 64 kilometres south of Luxor. The temple was mainly dedicated to the creator god Khnum and the goddess Neith. Other deities worshipped there included Heka, Menhyt and Nebetu.

The surviving temple was constructed during the Ptolemaic period. Building began under Ptolemy V Epiphanes, while decoration continued under Ptolemy VI Philometor, Ptolemy VIII and Cleopatra II. During the Roman period, a large columned hall was added, probably under Emperor Claudius. Its decoration continued until the reign of Decius, in the third century AD.

== History and architecture ==
Only the large hypostyle hall of the temple remains standing. The original sanctuary and the other rooms of the temple have disappeared or lie beneath the modern city of Esna.

The hall is approximately 37 metres long, 20 metres wide and 15 metres high. Its roof is supported by eighteen columns and six half-columns. The twenty-four columns and half-columns have decorated capitals based on different plant forms, and no two capitals are identical.

The ceiling is decorated with astronomical images, including stars, planets, constellations and the zodiac. The walls and columns contain religious texts, calendars, hymns and scenes of rulers making offerings to Egyptian gods. Fourteen of the columns preserve parts of an extensive temple ritual.

The temple contains some of the latest extensive hieroglyphic inscriptions known from ancient Egypt. The priests of Esna used rare signs, unusual spellings and visual wordplay in the inscriptions.

The temple contains the names and representations of numerous Roman emperors, including Claudius, Vespasian, Domitian, Trajan, Hadrian, Commodus, Septimius Severus, Caracalla, Geta, Philip the Arab and Decius. They were portrayed according to traditional Egyptian customs, wearing pharaonic crowns and presenting offerings to the gods.

Philip the Arab was represented in two scenes. One showed him worshipping Montu-Ra and Tjenenet, while the other showed him presenting a ceremonial collar to Shu and Tefnut. After Philip was defeated by Decius, Philip's names were erased and replaced with the names of Decius. Some column cartouches of Decius were also placed over earlier cartouches of Philip.

The name of Decius is the latest securely dated imperial name preserved at the temple.

== See also ==
- Esna
- Khnum
- Egyptian temple
- Ancient Egyptian architecture
- Temple of Edfu
- Dendera Temple complex
