= Famine Stela =

Hieroglyphic inscription on Sehel Island, Egypt

Coordinates: 24°03′27.05″N 32°52′26.40″E

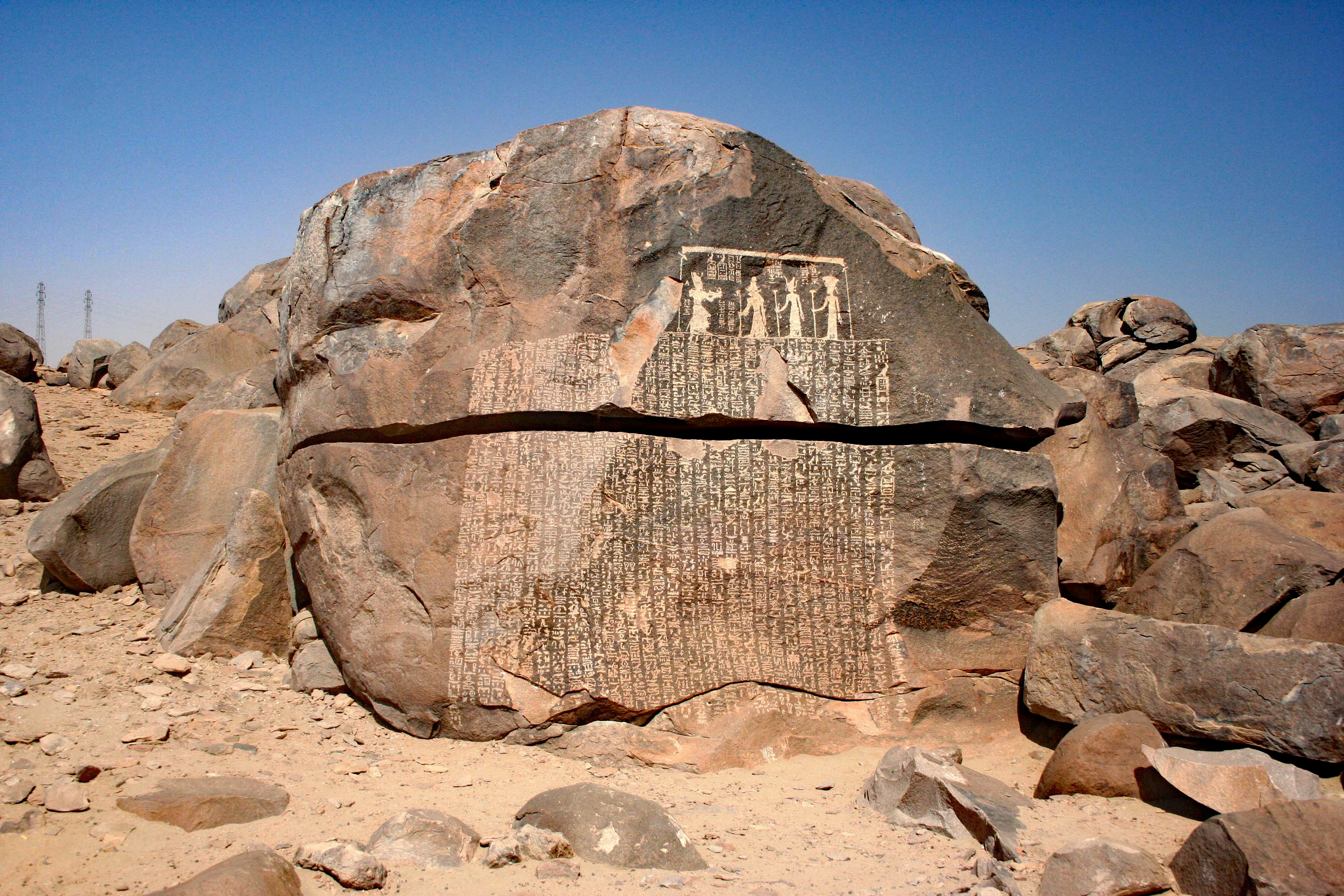
The Famine Stela, with some carved sections missing.

Location of the Famine Stela in Egypt

The Famine Stela is an inscription written in Egyptian hieroglyphs located on Sehel Island in the Nile near Aswan in Egypt, which tells of a seven-year period of drought and famine during the reign of pharaoh Djoser (reigned ca. 2686–2648 BC) of the Third Dynasty. It is thought that the stele was inscribed during the Ptolemaic Kingdom, which ruled from 332 to 31 BC. The inscription has been tentatively dated to the reign of king Ptolemy V (205 – 180 BC).

== Description ==
The Famine Stela was inscribed into a natural granite block whose surface was cut into the rectangular shape of a stela. The inscription is written in hieroglyphs and contains 32 columns. The top part of the stele depicts three Egyptian deities: Khnum, Satis and Anuket. In front of them, Djoser faces them, carrying offerings in his outstretched hands. A broad fissure, which already existed at the time of creating the stela, runs horizontally through the middle of the rock. Some sections of the stela are damaged, making a few passages of the text unreadable.

== The inscription ==
The story told on the stela is set in the 18th year of the reign of Djoser.

The text describes how the king is upset and worried as the land has been in the grip of a drought and famine for seven years, during which time the Nile has not flooded the farmlands.

The text also describes how the Egyptians are suffering as a result of the drought and that they are desperate and breaking the laws of the land.

Djoser asks the priest staff under the supervision of high lector priest Imhotep for help. The king wants to know where the god of the Nile, Hapi, is born, and which god resides at this place.

Imhotep decides to investigate the archives of the temple ḥwt-Ibety (“House of the nets”), located at Hermopolis and dedicated to the god Thoth. He informs the king that the flooding of the Nile is controlled by the god Khnum at Elephantine from a sacred spring located on the island, where the god resides. Imhotep travels immediately to the location (Ancient Egyptian: jbw). In the temple of Khnum, called “Joy of Life”, Imhotep purifies himself, prays to Khnum for help and offers “all good things” to him. Suddenly he falls asleep and in his dream Imhotep is greeted by the kindly looking Khnum. The god introduces himself to Imhotep by describing who and what he is and then describes his own divine powers. At the end of the dream Khnum promises to make the Nile flow again. Imhotep wakes up and writes down everything that took place in his dream. He then returns to Djoser to tell the king what has happened.

The king is pleased with the news and issues a decree in which he orders priests, scribes and workers to restore Khnum's temple and to once more make regular offerings to the god. In addition, Djoser issues a decree in which he grants the temple of Khnum at Elephantine the region between Aswan and Tachompso (Koine Greek: Ταχομψώ) with all its wealth, as well as a share of all the imports from Nubia.

== Dating of the inscription ==
Since the initial translation and examination by French Egyptologist Paul Barguet in 1953, the Famine Stela has been of great interest to historians and Egyptologists. The language and layout used in the inscription suggests that the work can be dated to the Ptolemaic period, perhaps during the reign of king Ptolemy V (205 – 180 BC). Egyptologists such as Miriam Lichtheim and Werner Vycichl suggest that the local priests of Khnum created the text. The various religious groups in Egypt during Ptolemaic Dynasty jostled for power and influence, so the story of the Famine Stela could have been used as a means to legitimise the power of Khnum's priests over the region of Elephantine.

At the time of the first translation of the stela, it was thought that the story of a seven-year-famine might be connected to the biblical story in Genesis 41, where a famine of seven years also occurs, and this famine was not limited to Egypt but was widespread across the region. More recent investigations appear to confirm this, as the seven-year famine was a motif common to nearly all cultures of the Near East: a Mesopotamian account also speaks of a seven-year-famine and in the well known Gilgamesh-Epos the god Anu gives a prophecy about a famine for seven years. Another Egyptian account about a long-lasting drought appears in the so-called “Book of the Temple”, translated by German Demotist Joachim Friedrich Quack. The ancient text reports about king Neferkasokar (late 2nd dynasty), who faces a seven-year-famine during his reign.

The Famine Stela is one of only three known inscriptions that connect the cartouche name Djoser (“the blessed one”) with the serekh name Netjerikhet (“divine of body”) of king Djoser in one word, helping to confirm the two are referring to the same person. Therefore, it provides useful evidence for Egyptologists and historians who are involved in reconstructing the royal chronology of the Old Kingdom of Egypt.
