= Temple of Beit el-Wali =

Ancient Egyptian temple

Coordinates: 23°57′42.7″N 32°51′59″E

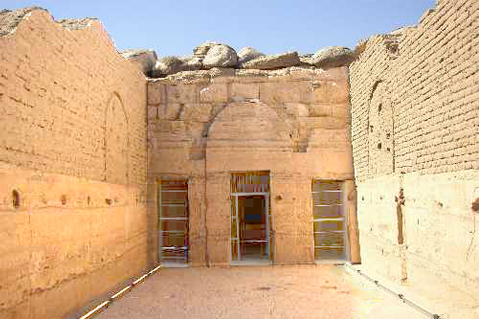
Forecourt of Beit el-Wali temple

The Temple of Beit el-Wali is a rock-cut ancient Egyptian temple in Nubia which was built by Pharaoh Ramesses II and dedicated to the deities of Amun-Re, Re-Horakhti, Khnum and Anuket. It was the first in a series of temples built by Ramesses II in this region; its name Beit el-Wali means 'House of the Holy Man' and may indicate its previous use by a Christian hermit at some point in time. The temple was relocated during the 1960s as part of the International Campaign to Save the Monuments of Nubia as a result of the Aswan High Dam project and moved towards higher ground along with the Temple of Kalabsha. This move was coordinated with a team of Polish archaeologists financed jointly by a Swiss and Chicago institute respectively. The temple was located 50 kilometres south of Aswan.

== History ==
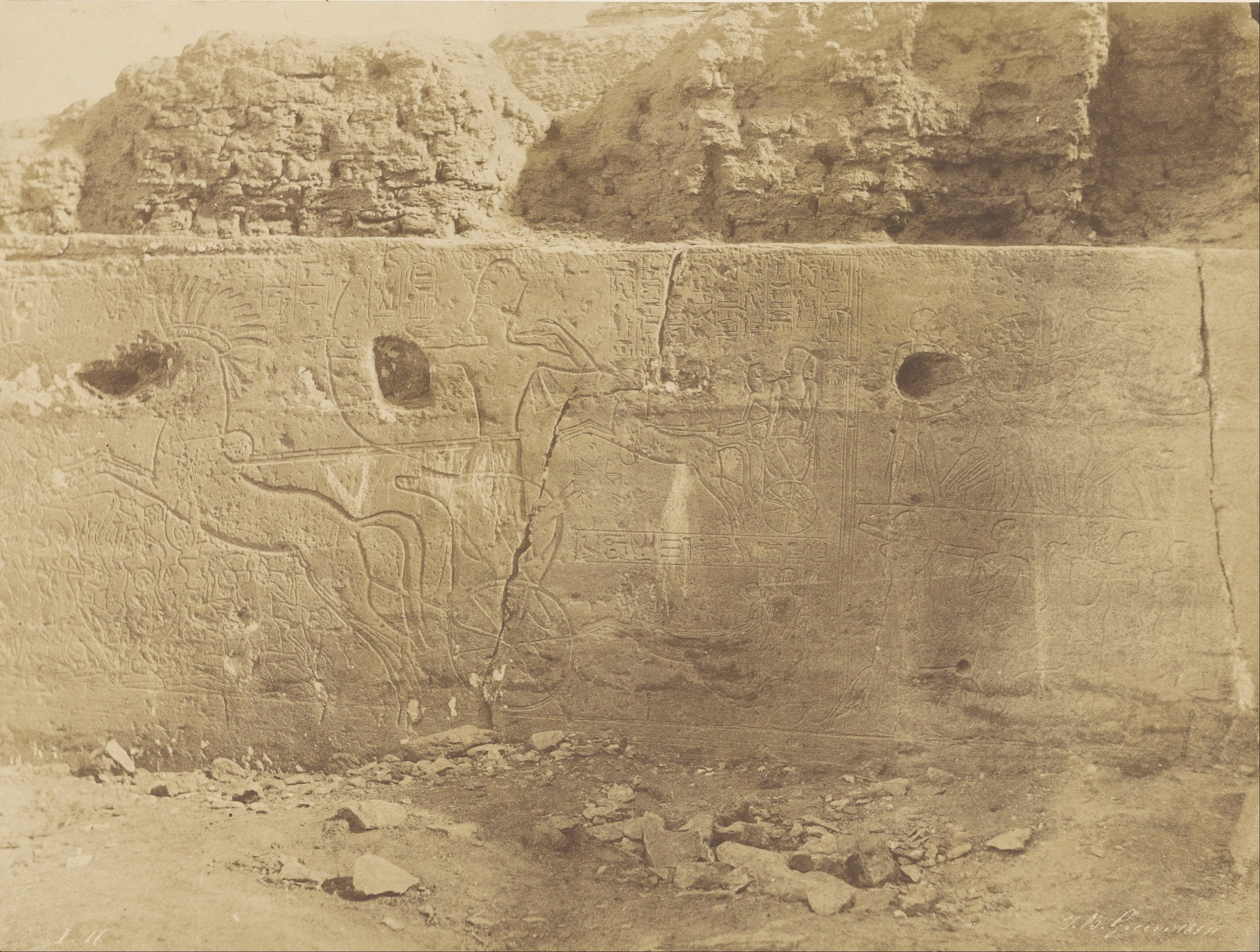
Earliest photo, 1854 by John Beasley Greene

The Nubian temples of Ramesses II (i.e. Wadi es-Sebua, Beit el-Wali and Abu Simbel), were part of a state sponsored policy designed to maintain Egyptian control over this area. During the New Kingdom period of Egypt, Nubia was not only ruled by Egyptian officials but also subject to:

a deliberate policy of acculturation, the intention of which was to break down Nubian identity. Many leading Nubians were educated in Egypt and adopted Egyptian dress, burial customs and religion. They spoke the Egyptian language and even changed their names to Egyptian ones. the decoration of the temples was to some extent royal propaganda intended to intimidate the [local] population.

== Temple architecture and decorations ==
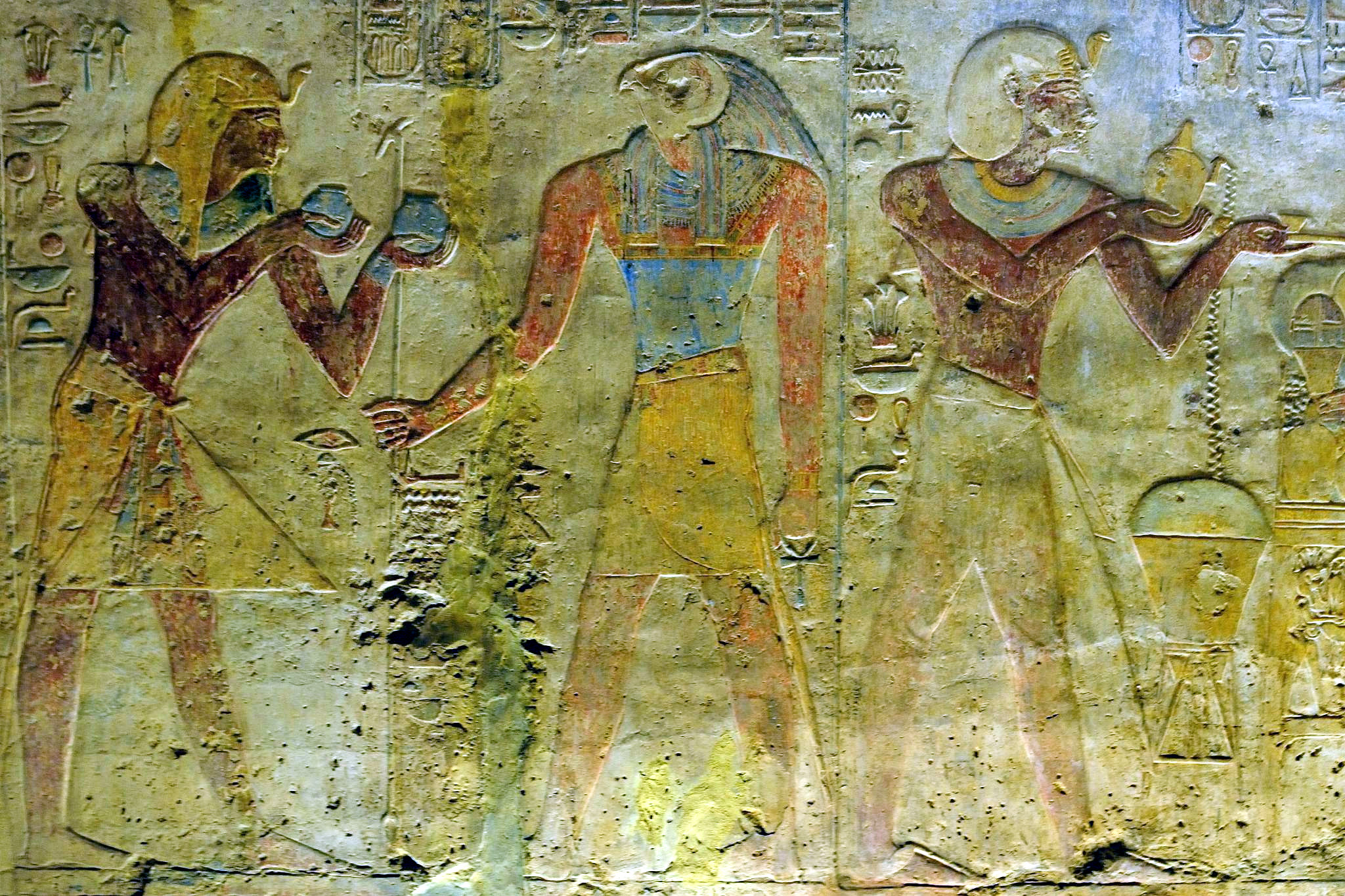
Wall relief of Ramesses II making an offering to Horus at Beit el-Wali temple

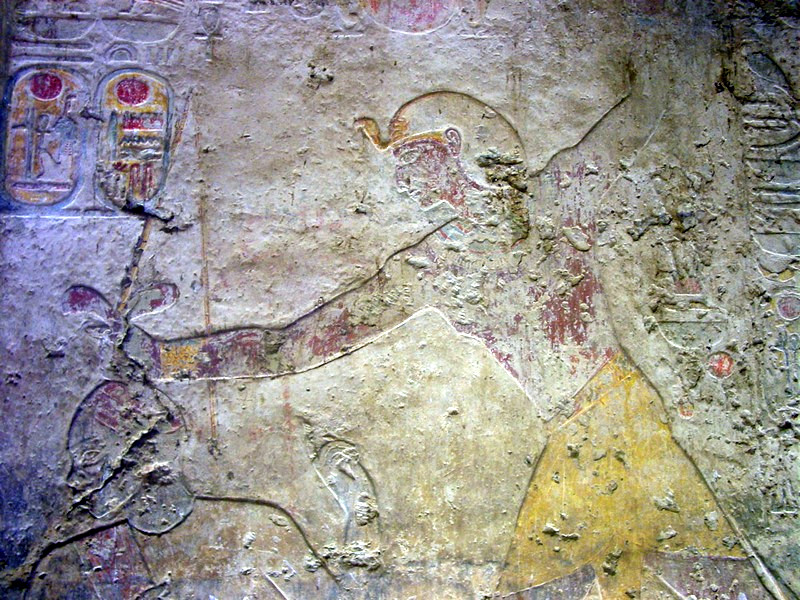
Relief of Ramesses II smiting an enemy of Egypt from Beit el-Wali

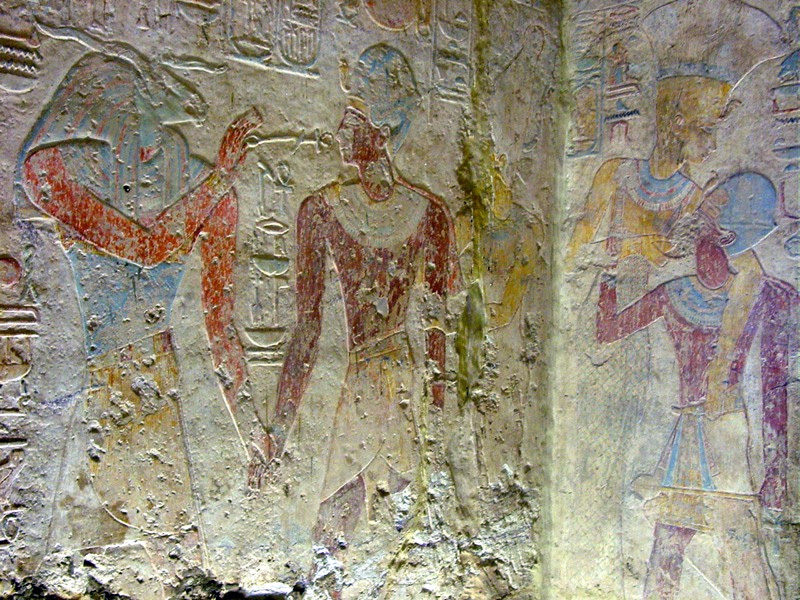
Relief of Ramesses II being suckled by Anuket and offered life by Khnum

There is a large amount of original colour remaining in the inner part of this temple though the paint has disappeared from the historical scenes on its Forecourt. Near the middle of the south wall of the temple, Ramesses II is depicted charging into battle against the Nubians while his two young sons Amun-her-khepsef and Khaemwaset are shown being present in this relief scene. In the next relief scene,

Ramesses [is] enthroned, receiving the tribute of Nubia. In the upper register, Ramesses' eldest son and the viceroy Amenemope present the tribute procession. The viceroy is rewarded for his efforts with gold collars.

"A painted cast from a wall relief" in the Beit el-Wali temple then illustrates the wealth of exotic products which the Egyptians obtained in trade or tribute from the Kushites; here, the pharaoh receives "leopard-skins, giraffe tails, giraffes, monkeys, leopards, cattle, antelopes, gazelles, lions, ostrich feathers and eggs, ebony, ivory, fans, bowls, shields made of [animal] hides, and gold." Some of the Nubians who are part of the tribute "would be destined to be taken to Egypt to work on the king's building projects, act as policemen or be recruited into the army for service in Syria." The overriding theme of Egyptian military success is also hammered home on the opposite wall, where Ramesses II's triumphal campaigns in Libya and Syria were recorded: he is portrayed trampling his enemies and holding others "by their hair in his left hand while smiting them with his right."

The theme of Ramesses' might is also carried into the temple's interior where there are further smiting scenes on the walls of the vestibule. Henceforth, Ramesses II is shown as a pious ruler who worships other deities; besides the doorway leading to the sanctuary "are niches containing statues of the king with (on the left) Isis and Horus and (on the right) Khnum and Anuket, the gods of Elephantine and the First Cataract." The pharaoh is shown presenting vases of wine to Khnum. The deity Anuket offers Ramesses several jubilees. The sanctuary contains three rock-cut cult images perhaps that of Amun, Ptah and Ramesses II. The most touching scenes are on eitherside of the doorway where Ramesses is shown as a child being suckled by Isis and Anuket; however, the statue niche was destroyed later perhaps in the Christian era. The exquisite reliefs of Beit el-Wali and its unusual plan differentiates it from later temples by this pharaoh which are located further south in Nubia.

The temple of Beit el-Wali is small, and was built on a symmetrical level. It is made up of a forecourt, an anteroom with two columns and a sanctuary cut into the surrounding rock, with the exception of the entrance and the doorway. The temple was fronted by a pylon.

At the beginning of the Christian Coptic period, the temple was used as a church. Many early travellers visited the temple; its architectural and artistic details were published by Günther Roeder in 1938.

== Further readings ==
- Ricke, Herbert; Hughes, George R.; and Wente, Edward F. (1967). The Beit el-Wali Temple of Ramesses II. The University of Chicago Oriental Institute Nubian Expedition, Volume 1. Chicago: University of Chicago Press.
- Roeder, Günther (1938). Der Felsentempel von Bet el-Wali. Cairo: Imprimerie de l'Institut français d'archéologie orientale.
- Fisher, Marjorie M. (2012). "Beit al-Wali". In D'Auria, Sue; Lacovara, Peter; and Roehrig, Catharine H. (eds.), Ancient Nubia: African Kingdoms on the Nile, pp. 390–393. New York: Institute for the Study of the Ancient World.
- Wilkinson, Richard H. (2000). The Complete Temples of Ancient Egypt. London: Thames & Hudson.
- Török, László (2009). Between Two Worlds: The Frontier Region between Ancient Nubia and Egypt 3700 BC–500 AD. Leiden: Brill.
- Porter, Bertha, and Moss, Rosalind L. B. (1952). Topographical Bibliography of Ancient Egyptian Hieroglyphic Texts, Reliefs, and Paintings, Volume VII: Nubia, the Deserts and Outside Egypt. Oxford: Griffith Institute.

== See also ==
- List of ancient Egyptian sites, including sites of temples

== Notes and references ==
=== Bibliography ===
- Dieter Arnold & Nigel Strudwick, The Encyclopaedia of Ancient Egyptian Architecture, I.B. Tauris Publishers, 2003.
- Lorna Oakes, Pyramids, Temples and Tombs of Ancient Egypt:An Illustrated Atlas of the Land of the Pharaohs, Hermes House: Anness Publishing Ltd, 2003.
- Günther Roeder, Der Felsentempel von Bet el-Wali (Cairo, 1938) ('The rock temple of Bet el-Wali')
