= Paul Barguet =

French egyptologist (1915–2012)

- Born: September 8, 1915; Montbéliard, France
- Died: February 1, 2012 (aged 96); Dax, France
- Occupation: Egyptologist

Paul Barguet (September 8, 1915 – February 1, 2012) was a French Egyptologist.

== Biography ==
He studied the Ancient Egyptian language at the École pratique des hautes études.

From 1947 to 1951, he worked at the French Institute for Oriental Archaeology in Cairo. He became curator at the Department of Egyptian Antiquities of the Louvre in 1959 and was an Egyptian epigraphy teacher at the Louvre School between 1956 and 1979. Barguet was then director of the Institute of Egyptology at the University of Lyon 2, where he was succeeded by Jean-Claude Goyon in 1981.

He published a translation and examination of the Famine Stela at Sehel Island in 1953.

In 1967, he published a French translation of the Egyptian Book of the Dead.

In 1995, Barguet wrote his memoir, Une vie d’égyptologue, which was published posthumously.

== Awards and honors ==
- Ordre des Palmes académiques

== Works ==
- Les textes des sarcophages égyptiens du Moyen Empire (1986)
- Le livre des morts des Anciens Egyptiens (1967)
- Le temple d'Amon-Rê à Karnak. Essai d'exégèse (1962)
