= Khnum =

God of creation and the waters in Egyptian mythology

- The Egyptian god Khnum was usually depicted with the head of a ram.
Name in hieroglyphs
W9 E10
- Major cult center: Elephantine, Esna
- Symbol: the potter's wheel
- Consort: Heqet, Satis, Neith, Menhit, and Nebtuwi
- Offspring: Heka, Serket and Anuket

Equivalents
- Lower Egyptian: Banebdjedet

Khnum, also romanised Khnemu (/kəˈnuːm/; Ancient Egyptian: 𓎸𓅱𓀭 ẖnmw, Koine Greek: Χνοῦβις Chnoûbis), was one of the earliest-known Egyptian deities in Upper Egypt, originally associated with the Nile cataract. He held the responsibility of regulating the annual inundation of the river, emanating from the caverns of Hapi, the deity embodying the flood. Since the annual flooding of the Nile brought with it silt and clay, and its water brought life to its surroundings, he eventually became known as the creator of human bodies and the life force kꜣ ("ka"). Using a potter's wheel and clay, he fashioned these entities and placed them within their mothers' wombs. Often, his creative endeavors were overseen by another god. He was later described as having moulded the other deities, and was revered as the creator of the animal kingdom. Banebdjedet was the equivalent god in Lower Egypt.

Worship of Khnum spanned from the First Dynasty and persisted even into the Greco-Roman period when rule by native dynasties had ended. Initially, his primary cult center was at Herwer in Middle Egypt. While his presence on the island of Elephantine dates back to the Early Dynastic Period, it wasn't until the New Kingdom that he ascended to become the principal deity of the island, acquiring the title as the overseer of the First Cataract of the Nile River. At Elephantine, Khnum formed a divine triad alongside the Nubian goddesses Satis and Anuket. His religious significance also extended to Esna, located south of Thebes.

Khnum's primary function in the inception of human beings was typically portrayed with the horns of a ram, one of the sacred animals worshiped in Ancient Egypt, representing aspects such as fertility, rebirth, regeneration, and resurrection. He was originally illustrated with horizontally spiraled horns (based on the Ancient Egyptian corkscrew-horned sheep, an extinct subspecies of the barbary sheep), but his representation later evolved to feature the down-turned horns of Ammon in the New Kingdom (based on the extinct sheep subspecies Ovis platyra palaeoaegyptiacus). Khnum's imagery also includes the crocodile head, denoting his dominion over the Nile. He can additionally be found wearing the atef crown adorned with two feathers, or the white crown of Upper Egypt.

== Etymology ==
The hieroglyphic symbol hnm (𓎸 ) often appearing in Khnum's name is derived from the word hnmt, signifying "well", or "spring". His name can also be connected to a Semitic root meaning "sheep". Alternatively, the formation of the name can be interpreted as "the beloved divine being". Khnum is also often described with the term iw m hapy, meaning "the coming of the Nile". Additionally, he is called Khnum-Ra, representing his role in the Nile cataract as the soul of the sun-god, Ra. Khnum's positions and powers are described through various titles such as the "Creator god", "Potter god", "Lord of Life", "Lord of the Field", "Lord of Esna", "the good protector", and "Lord of the crocodiles".

Over time, the Egyptian word khn.m was later created to mean "shape" or "build", akin to Khnum's divine powers in creation. His significance also led to early theophoric names of him, for children, such as Khnum-Khufwy "Khnum is my Protector", the full name of Khufu, builder of the Great Pyramid of Giza.

== Worship ==
The worship of Khnum centered on two principal riverside sites, Elephantine and Esna, which were regarded as sacred sites. At Elephantine, he was worshipped alongside Satis and Anuket, while at Esna, he was worshipped alongside Menhit, Nebtu, Neith and Heka. Banebdjedet was the equivalent god in Lower Egypt. Khnum has also been related to the deity Min.

At the Temple at Elephantine and the Temple at Esna, ancient rituals and festivals would take place. Among these was a fertility rite, exclusively participated in by women seeking to conceive, with male priests disallowed. Held late in the evening at the Temple of Esna, this ceremony featured women presenting a potter's wheel and offering chants before a concealed statue in honor of Khnum. The "Installation of the Potter's Wheel" culminated in a celebrated with a feast, occurring on the first day of the month of Paremhat.

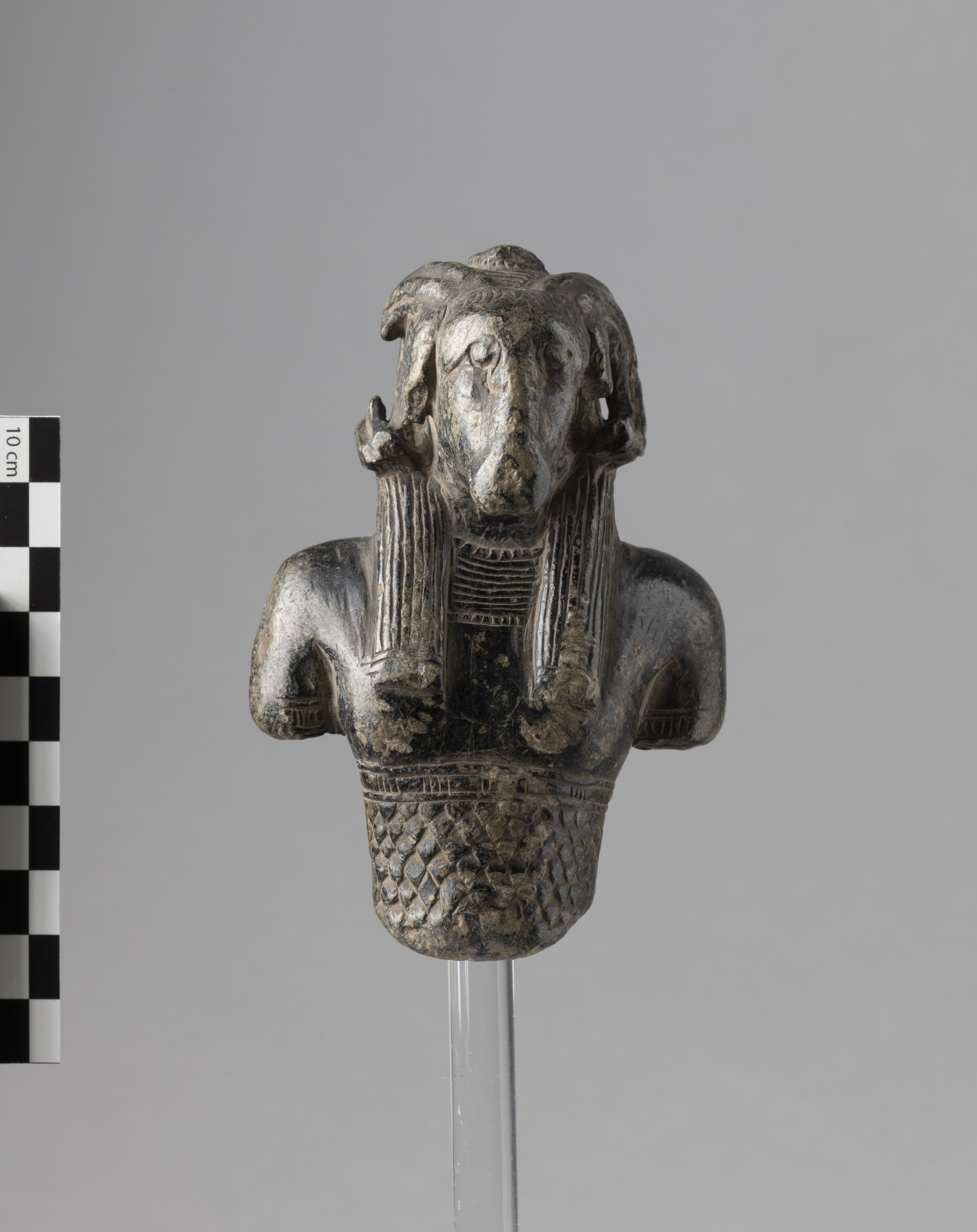
Statuette of Khnum in steatite, Late Period (722–332 BC). Museo Egizio, Turin (Cat. 513).

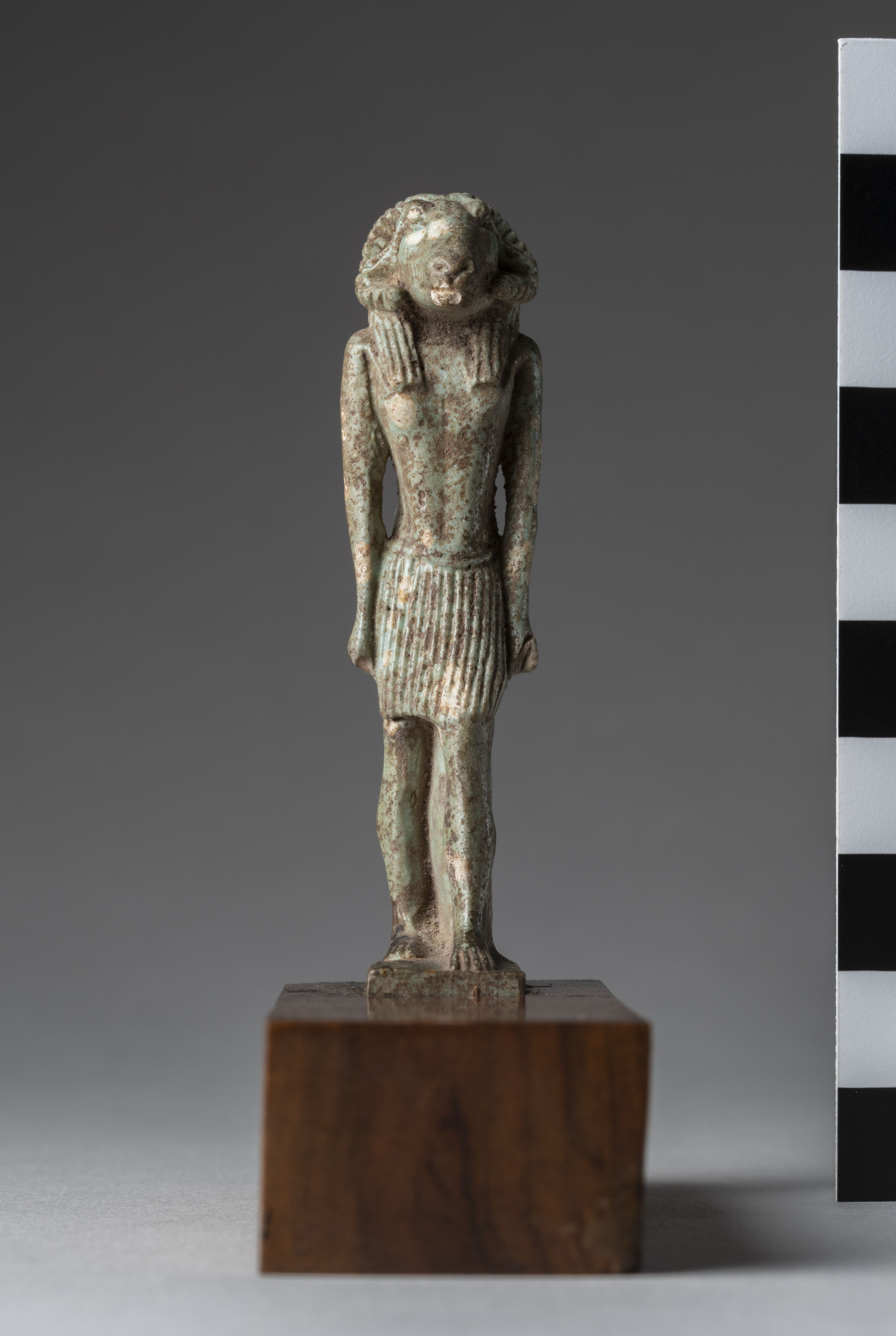
Amulet depicting Khnum or Amun in Egyptian faience, Late Period (722–332 BC). Museo Egizio, Turin (Cat. 490).

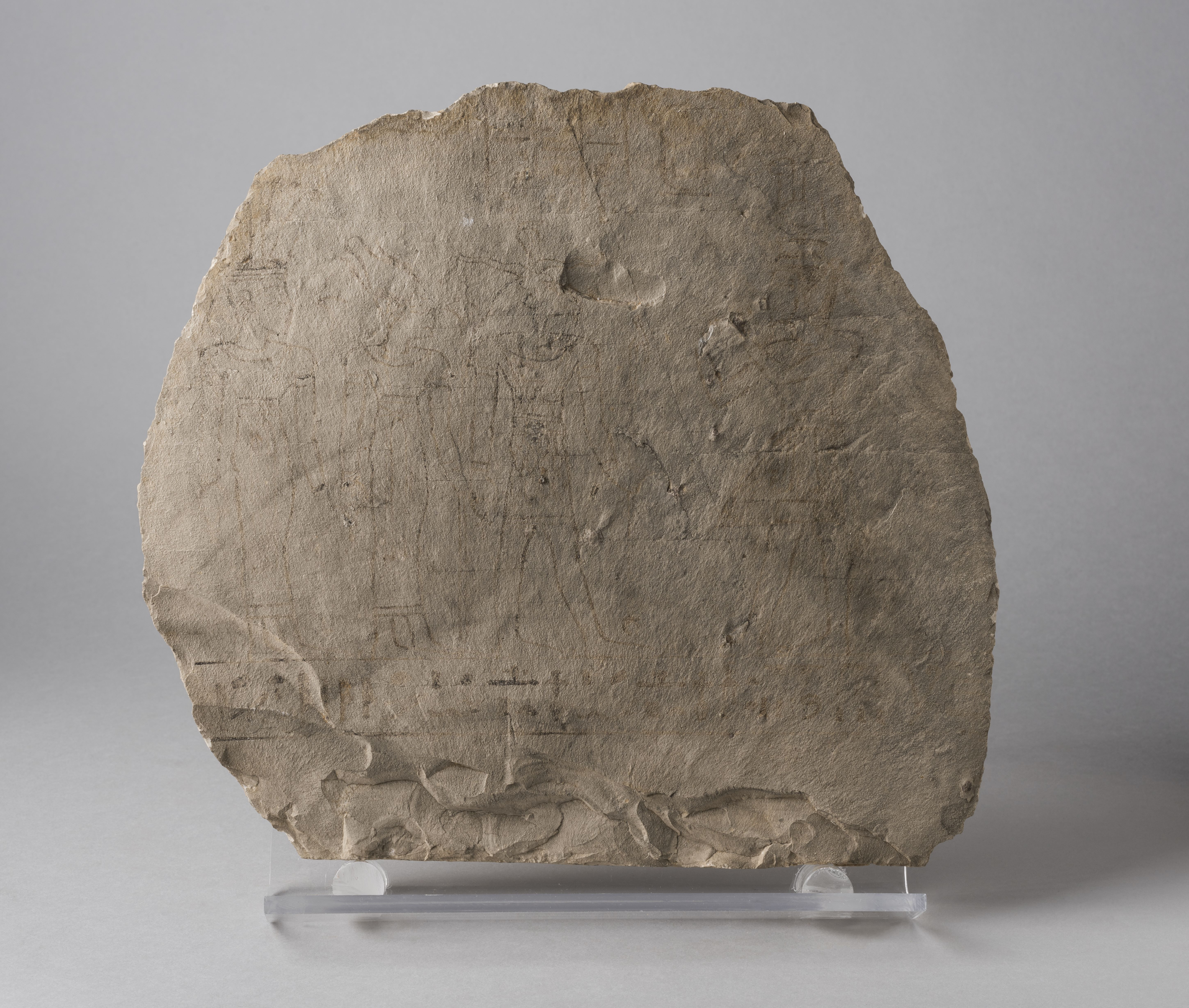
Figured and inscribed ostracon showing Amenhotep I worshipping before the triad of Elephantine, in limestone, New Kingdom (1539–1076 BC). Museo Egizio, Turin (Suppl. 5688).

== Temple at Elephantine ==
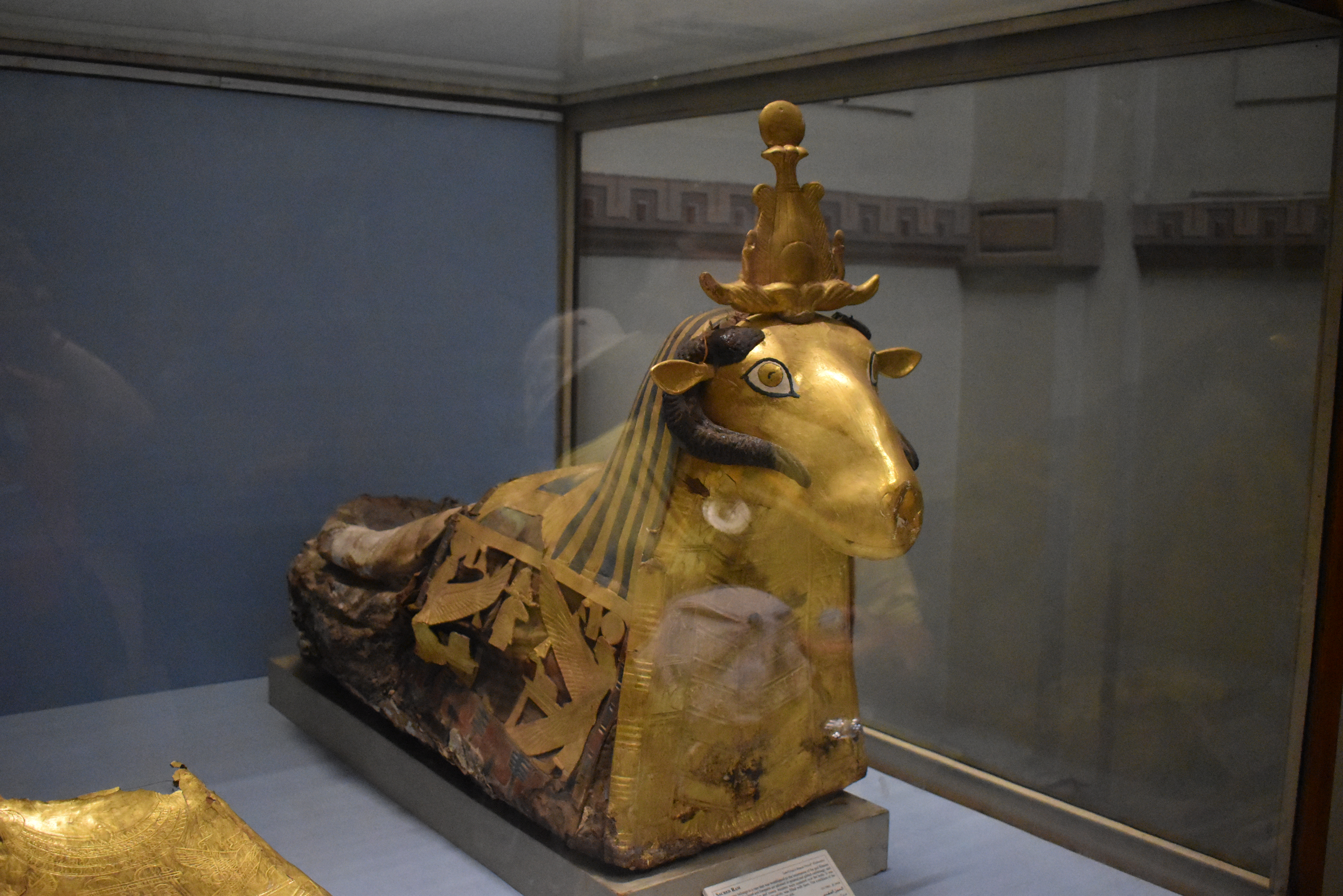
Coffin of a Ram associated with Khnum in the Egyptian Museum.

The original cult center of Khnum was situated in the town of Elephantine, with the temple dating back to the Middle Kingdom era. Khnum, along with his consort Satis and daughter Anuket, were all documented at Elephantine by the Eleventh Dynasty. During the New Kingdom period, leaders expanded existing temples and erected additional structures on the island of Elephantine. Notable additions included the Temples of Khnum and Satis, overseen by Hatshepsut and Thutmose III, along with a way-station for the festival barque dedicated to Khnum. Subsequent Ptolemaic and Roman rulers also imposed their own embellishments later on.

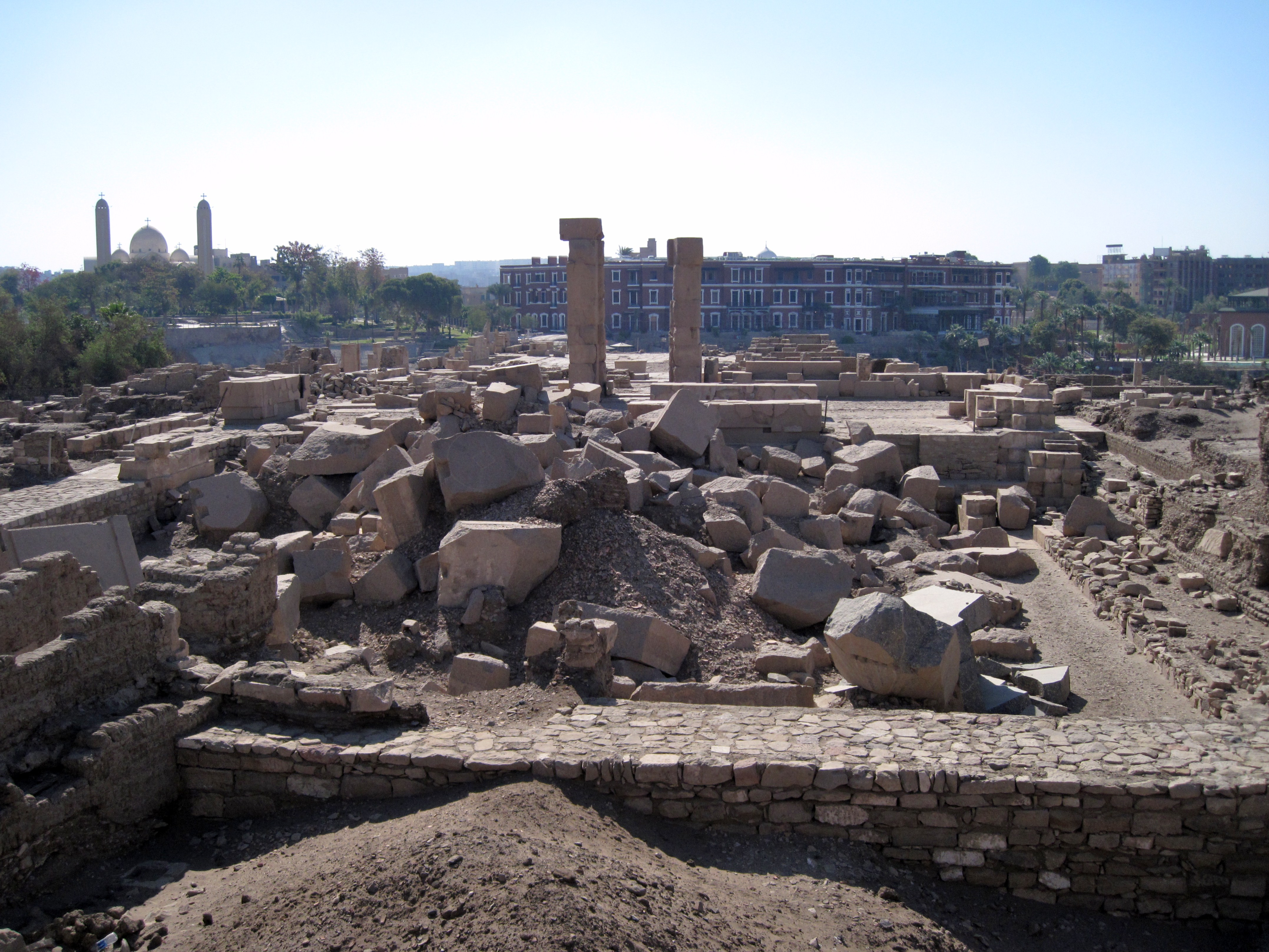
Remains of the temple house of the Khnum Temple on Elephantine Island in Aswan, Egypt

Rams revered by Khnum have been unearthed on the Elephantine Island, mummified, embellished with golden headgear, and placed in stone coffins. There is also evidence discovered of tensions between the staff at the Temple of Elephantine and a nearby Jewish temple, arising from a desire of the Elephantine staff to enlarge the temple, causing detriment to the Jewish community.

Remnants from the Thirteenth Dynasty, such as limestone fragments, provide evidence of architectural features including an entrance, an ornamented room featuring ceremonial depictions, and a sacred boat shrine. Portions of the Greco-Roman Temple of Khnum are believed to have originated from the Middle Kingdom Temple of Satet. Opposite Elephantine, on the east bank at Aswan, Khnum, Satis and Anuket are shown on a chapel wall dating to the Ptolemaic Kingdom.

Presently, one of the few remaining sections of the Temple of Khnum is a grand monumental entrance.

== Temple at Esna ==
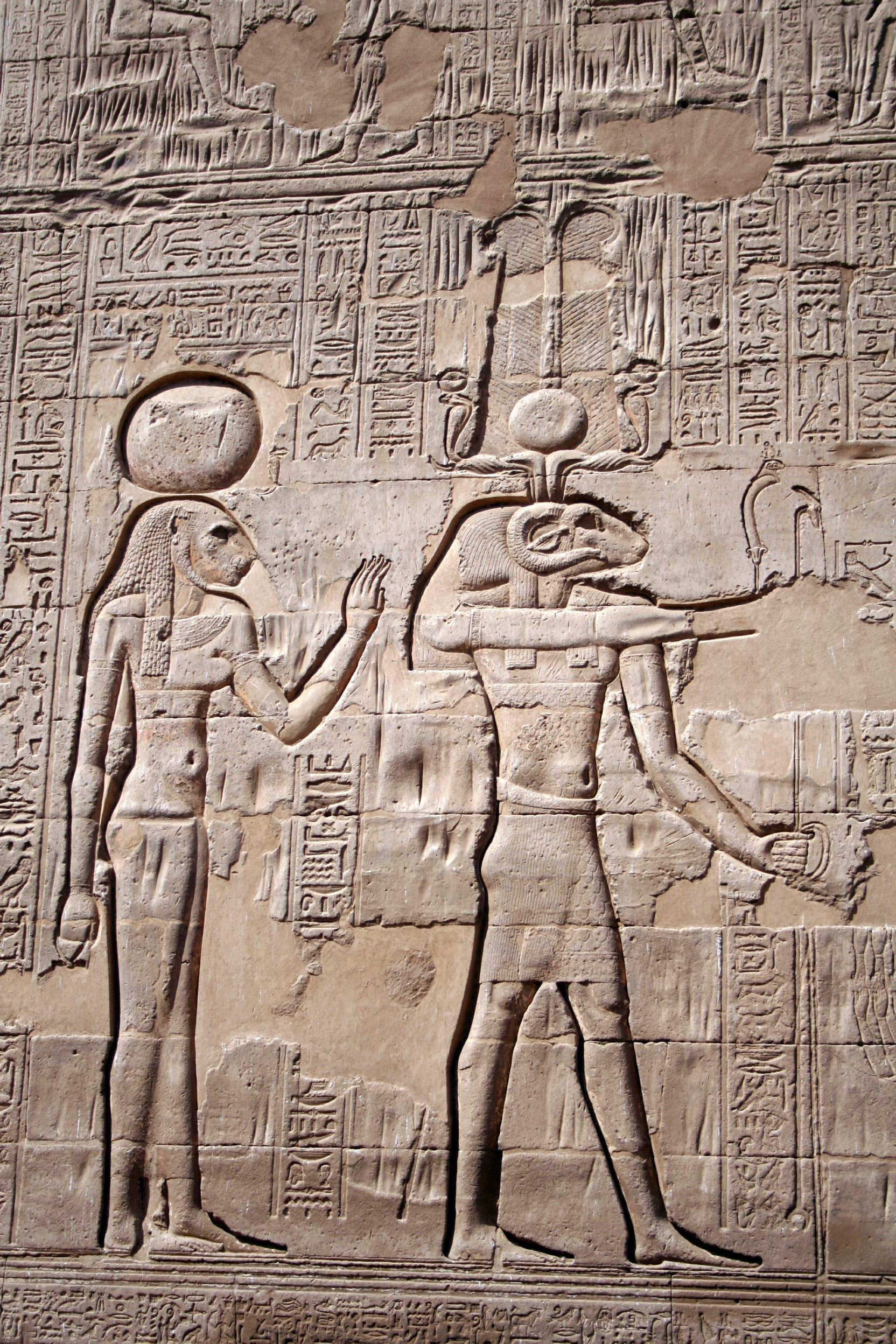
Khnum on the right with Menhit on the left, shown on the outside wall of the temple at Esna

In Esna, a temple was dedicated to Khnum, Neith and Heka, among other deities. Although construction of this temple commenced during the Ptolemaic era, the majority of its surviving sections were erected during Roman times. The temple rested in a field, which Khnum is regarded as the lord of, and was responsible for maintaining the land's fertility, ensuring the continuation of life. The Temple of Esna emphasizes his role as a divine potter through numerous hymns that attribute the creation of deities, mankind, plants, and animals to him. The north temple's wall features depictions of the favor shown by Roman rulers, showcasing offerings made by emperors and their encounters with deities.

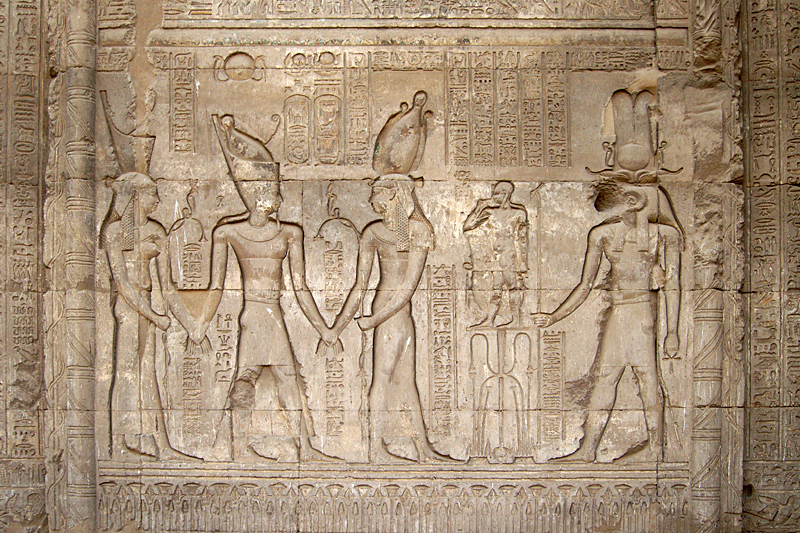
At the Temple of Esna, Emperor Tiberius is depicted led by the deities Wadjet and Nekhbet to Khnum.

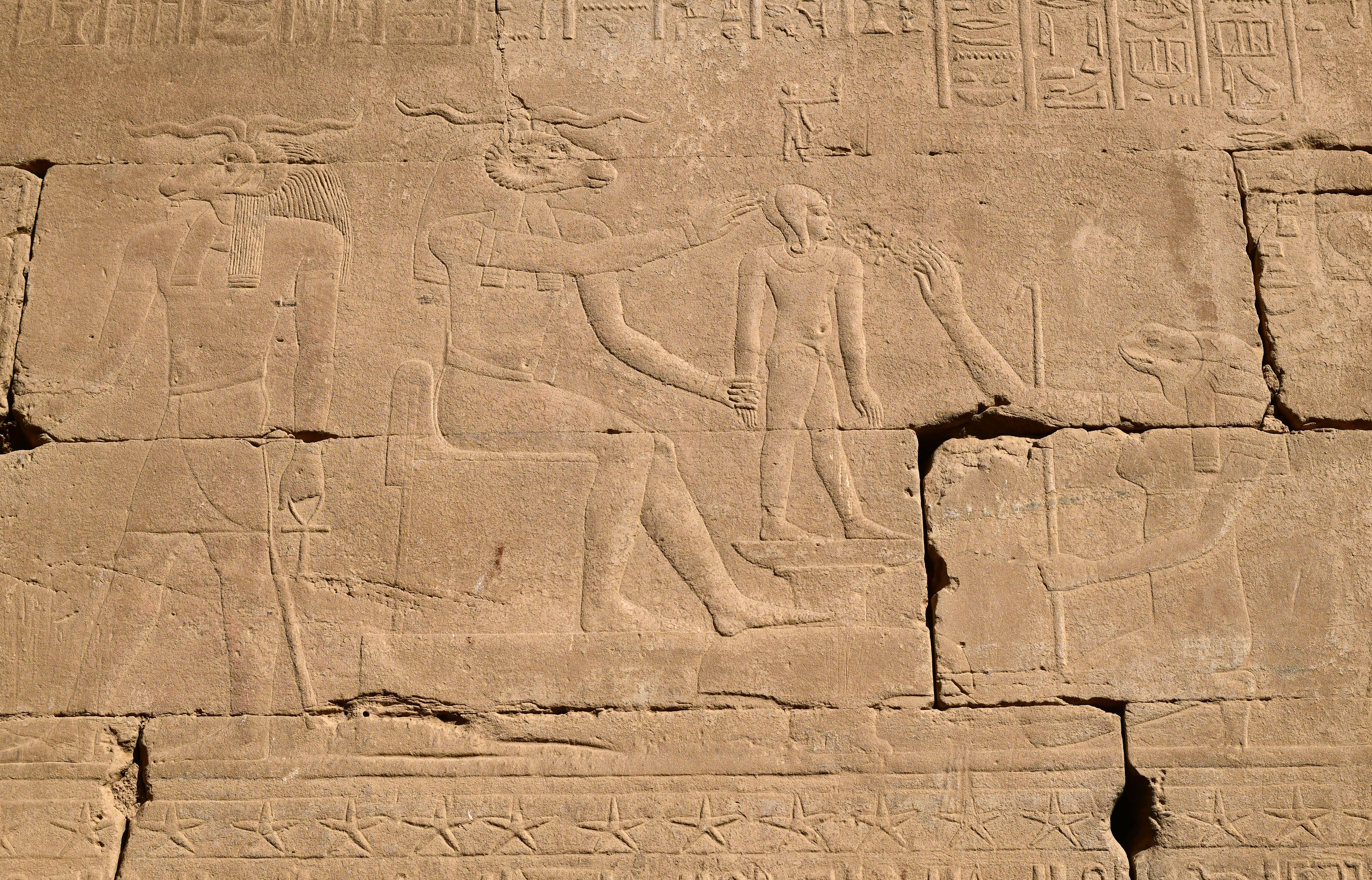
Khnum (left) fashions the god Ihy (middle) on a potter's wheel, with the help of the goddess Heqet, Dendera Temple.

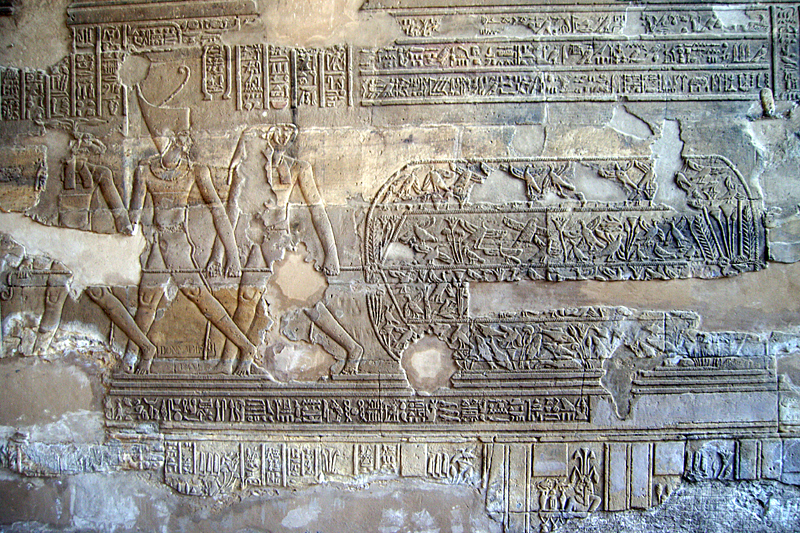
Horus, emperor Commodus and Khnum drawing a net with birds of the marshs and fishes, inner north wall, Temple of Khnum, Esna, Egypt.

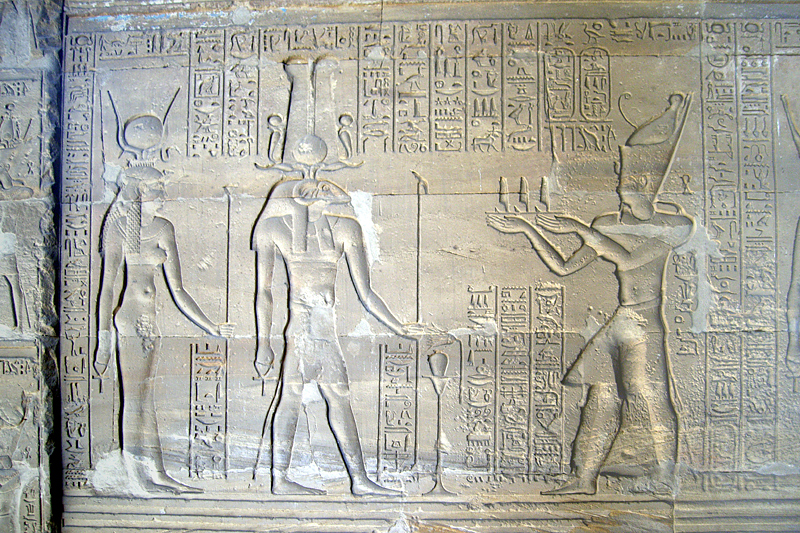
Scene at the south wall, king offers feathers to Khnum and Nepthys, Temple of Khnum, Esna, Egypt

Within the temple, Khnum is occasionally depicted with the head of a crocodile. His primary consorts are Nebtuwi and Menhit, while Heka is recognized as his eldest son and successor. Khnum is sometimes referred to as the "father of the fathers" and Neith as the "mother of the mothers". They later become the parents of Ra, who is also referred to as Khnum-Re.

The completion of hieroglyphic embellishments in Egyptian temples culminated with the Temple of Esna. Esna-A, built in the Ptolemaic era, later gained modern renown as the first ancient Egyptian structure to formally record a connection between the zodiac and the two decan lists.

Presently, much of the site lies in ruins, as many blocks had been repurposed to build a canal. The remnants of the temple lie largely obscured beneath modern residential areas.

== Portrayal in Art and Literature ==
Khnum is commonly depicted seated beside a potter's wheel, with a formed entity standing upon it, symbolizing his act of creation. Khnum is often portrayed alongside the frog-headed fertility goddess Heqet, who can be seen assisting him at the pottery wheel, as seen in the wall relief of the mammisi of Nectanebo II. Khnum and Heqet can also be found together molding the god Ihy at the Dendera Temple.

Statues of Khnum, Satis, and Anuket, along with Isis and Horus, adorned the Temple of Beit el-Wali of Ramesses II. In Karnak's Great Hypostyle Wall, Khnum stands beside Pharaoh Ramesses II and Horus, employing a net to ensnare water fowl. This is also similarly depicted on the inner north wall of the Temple at Esna with Khnum alongside the Roman emperor Commodus.

Throughout ancient texts, Khnum is depicted as a creator. In the Pyramid Texts of the later Old Kingdom, he crafts ferryboats and a ladder ascending to heaven. The Fifth Dynasty portrays him specifically as the creator of the vessels used by the sun god Ra, known as the solar barque. In the Middle Kingdom, Khnum is credited as the creator of humans in spell 214 of the Coffin Texts. Khnum is mentioned as an inactive god during a famine in the Ipuwer Papyrus of the 12th dynasty, where it is said he "does not fashion because of the state of the land." In the Papyrus d'Obriney of Seti II of the New Kingdom, or Tale of Two Brothers, Khnum is responsible for creating Bata's wife. Khnum's role extends to the Book of the Dead, as part of the formula spell to prevent the heart of the deceased from opposing them in the Necropolis.

=== Stelas ===
Khnum features prominently in an inscription and relief of the Ptolemaic Kingdom known as the Famine Stela, located on the island of Sehel, south of Elephantine. The stela recounts a seven-year period of drought and famine during the reign of King Djoser of the Third Dynasty. According to the inscription, Djoser receives a vision of Khnum, who promises to end the famine. In response, the king issues a decree of one-tenth of all revenue to be allocated to the Temple of Khnum as an offering of gratitude. Above the stela, King Djoser is depicted offering tributes to Khnum, as well as the goddesses Satis and Anuket.

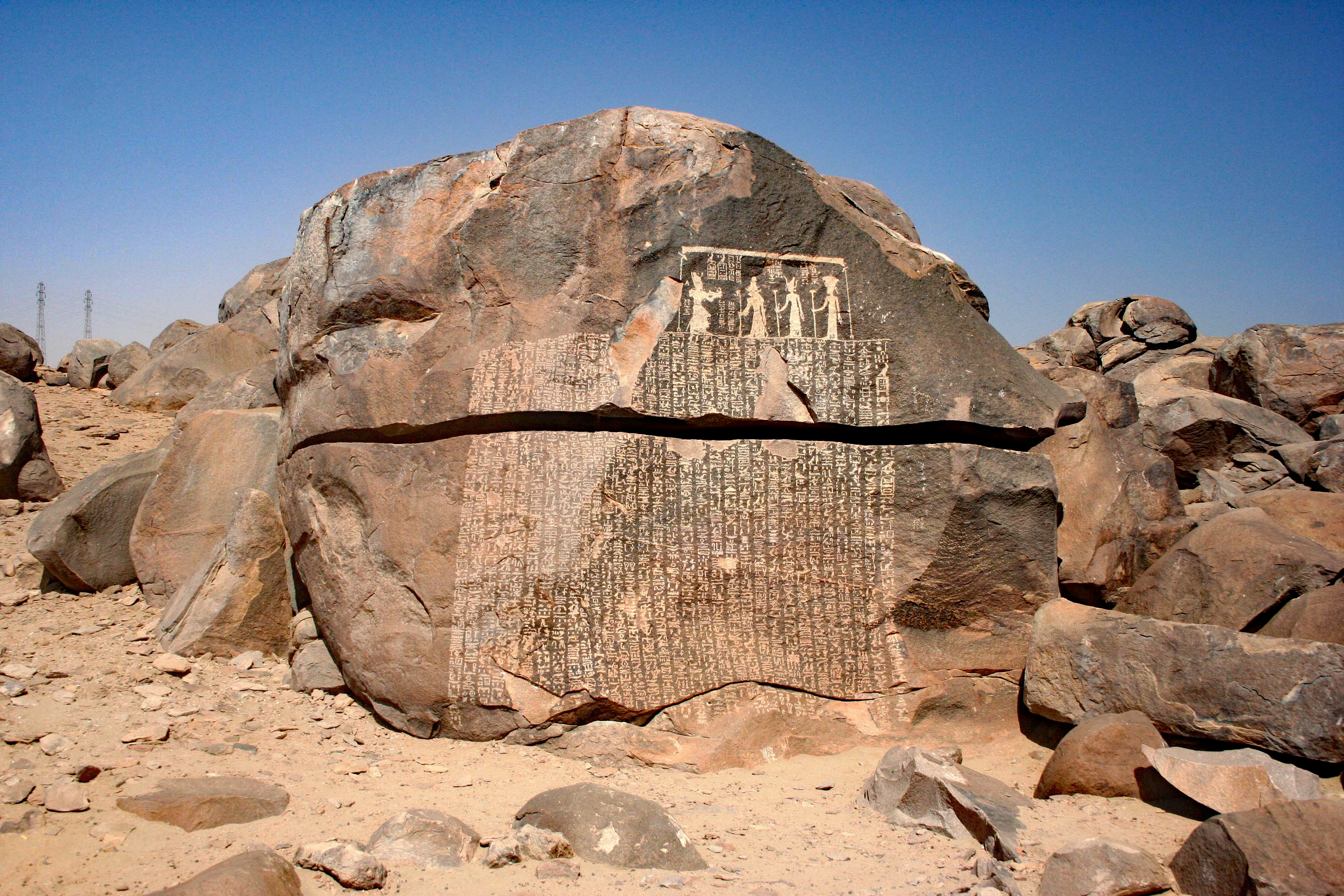
The Famine Stela, on the island of Sehel.

Khnum is also portrayed in the Stela of Seti I. The king is depicted presenting an offering to Khnum, bowing while holding two nw-pots. Khnum holds a was-scepter in his left hand and an ankh in his right, adorned in a kilt and an atef crown topped with a solar disk. Both figures stand on a mA-sickle and are equally sculpted. Above Khnum, it states, "Beloved of Khnum, lord of the West."

In the Stela of Tutankhamun from Sinn el-Kabid, Tutankhamun is depicted incensing the god Khnum. Khnum is seated on a throne, dressed in a kilt, chest piece, and wide collar, holding an ankh and a was-scepter. Khnum, revered at Kumma, holds an epithet indicative of his protective role over riverine and desert passes, symbolized by opposing bows at the entrances. The text above Khnum designates him as the "Lord of the Cataract."

=== Hymns ===
Khnum is a recurring figure in numerous of the hymns within the temples at Elephantine and Esna, showcasing his significance. Distinctively, The Morning Hymn to Khnum aligns him with the gods Amun and Shu, venerating him as the "Lord of life" and attributing him the ability to shape the bodies of humans. Another revered hymn, The Great Hymn to Khnum, celebrates him as the creator of all men, gods, and animals, as well as the provider of minerals and nurturer of plant life. This hymn delves into Khnum's intricate craftsmanship in forming body parts and assigning their functions. Additionally, Khnum is also acknowledged for creating a diversity of languages across regions, contrasting with Egyptian speech. In this hymn, Khnum is further depicted as the "Ba-of" many different deities scattered throughout Egypt, merging with the gods and representing the embodiment of their souls. In The Great Second Hymn to Khnum, the hymn depicts Khnum-Ra sailing across the sky to establish pillars with goddesses in the south, north, and east, and possibly the west.

Further linking Khnum to the divine narrative, he is mentioned in The Hymn to Hapy, connecting him to the Nile-god.

=== Divine Birth Scenes ===
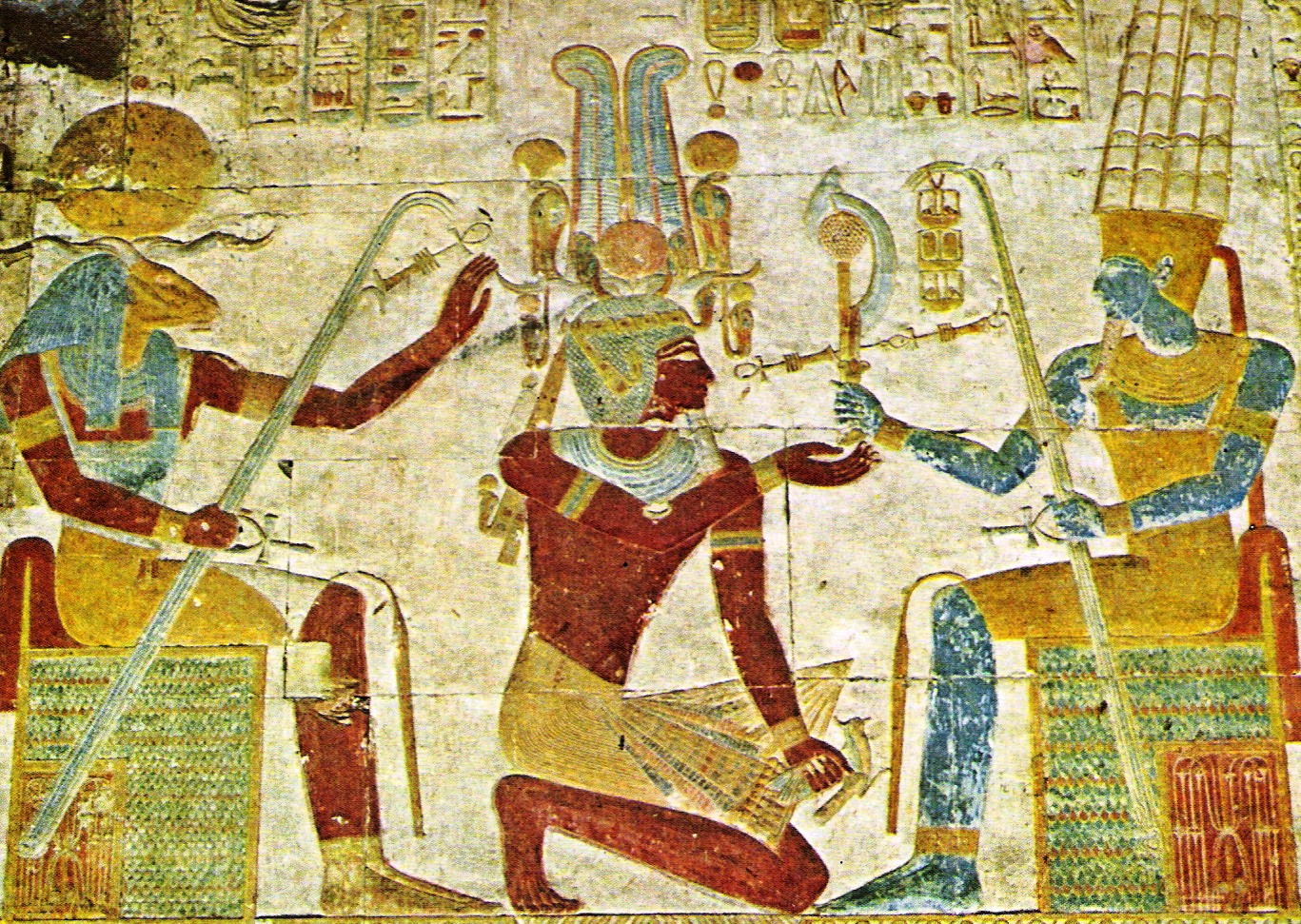
Khnum, Seti I and Amun in the Mortuary Temple of Seti I in Abydos

The god Khnum plays a significant role in the birth narratives of Egyptian leaders, often serving to legitimize their rule. In the Old Kingdom, King Sahure of the Fifth Dynasty can be seen suckling on the goddess Nekhbet at his birth, with Khnum presiding beside them. In the Middle Kingdom, the Westcar Papyrus, recounts the birth of three triplet kings by the woman Ruddedet. Khnum and the other deities disguise themselves to assist with the birth, and Khnum infuses "health" into the life of the bodies of the future kings, receiving a sack of barley as payment. Queen Hatshepsut of the New Kingdom was similarly illustrated being created on Khnum's potter's wheel in the depiction of her Divine Birth, at the Temple of Deir el-Bahari, bestowing "life, health, and strength, and all gifts," upon her. It is also carved that Khnum made "her appearance above the gods". Additionally, reliefs in the Luxor Temple illustrate Khnum crafting the body and ka of King Amenhotep III in a comparable manner.

== In popular culture ==
- Khnum is featured in Hirohiko Araki's 1989 Manga and its subsequent TV adaptation, JoJo's Bizarre Adventure Part 3: Stardust Crusaders as the stand of Oingo, the first of the Oingo Boingo Brothers, giving him the ability to alter his appearance in reference to Khnum's feat of creating humans.

== Gallery ==
Depictions of Khnum and the Temples at Esna and Elephantine
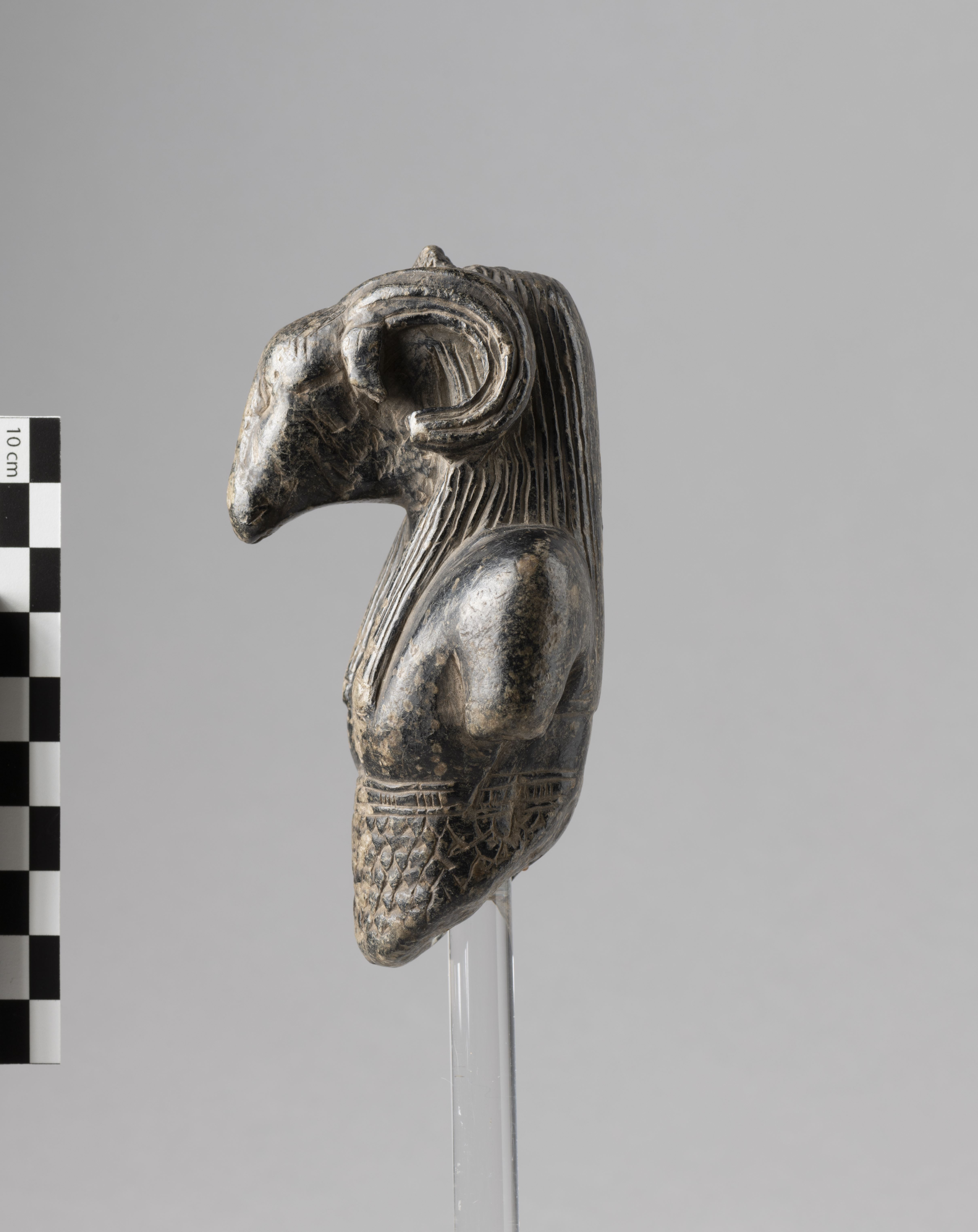
Khnum with the curved horns of Ammon, of the Late Period of ancient Egypt, made of soapstone.

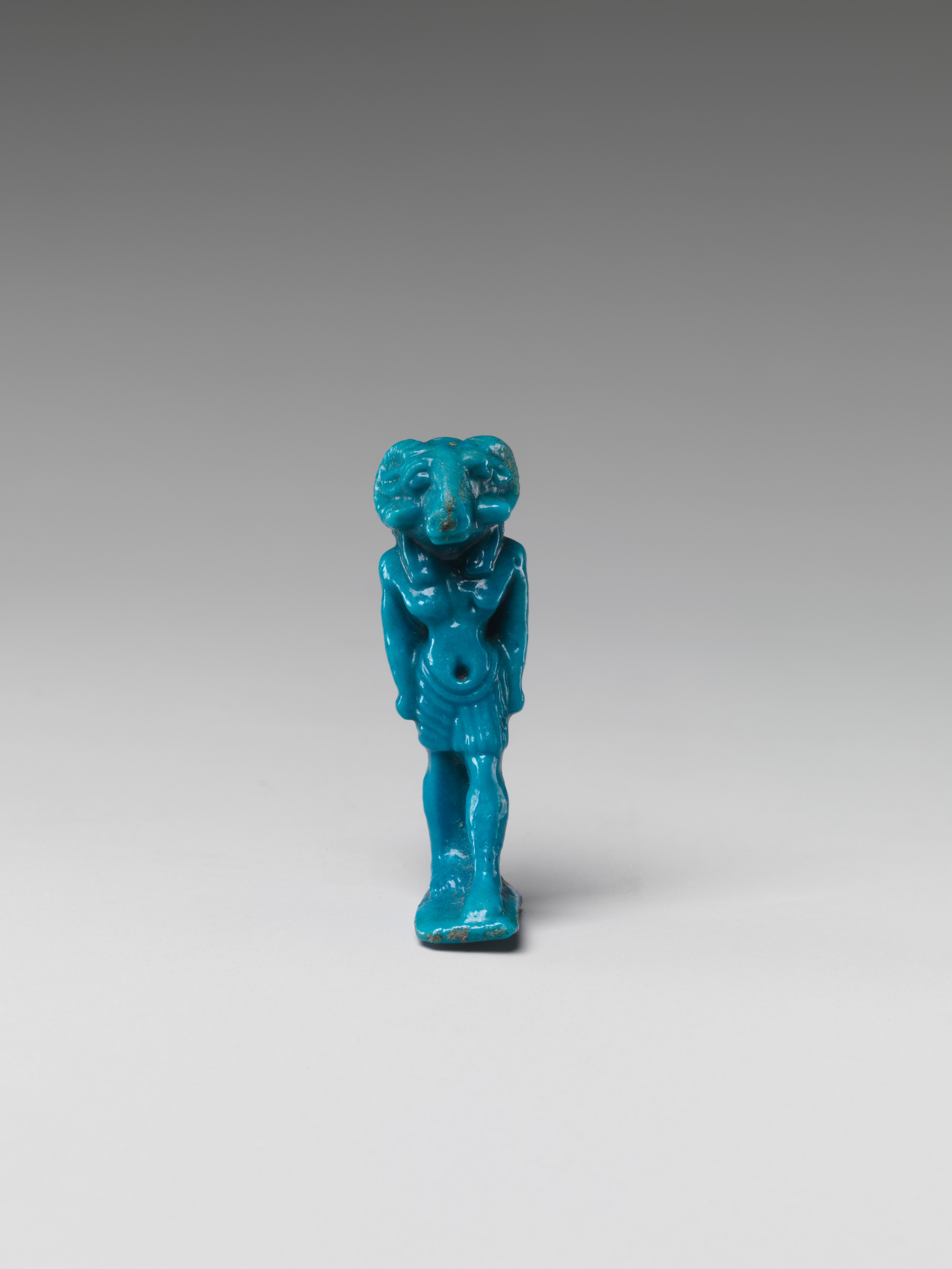
Amulet of Khnum, of the Ptolemaic Period, made of faience.

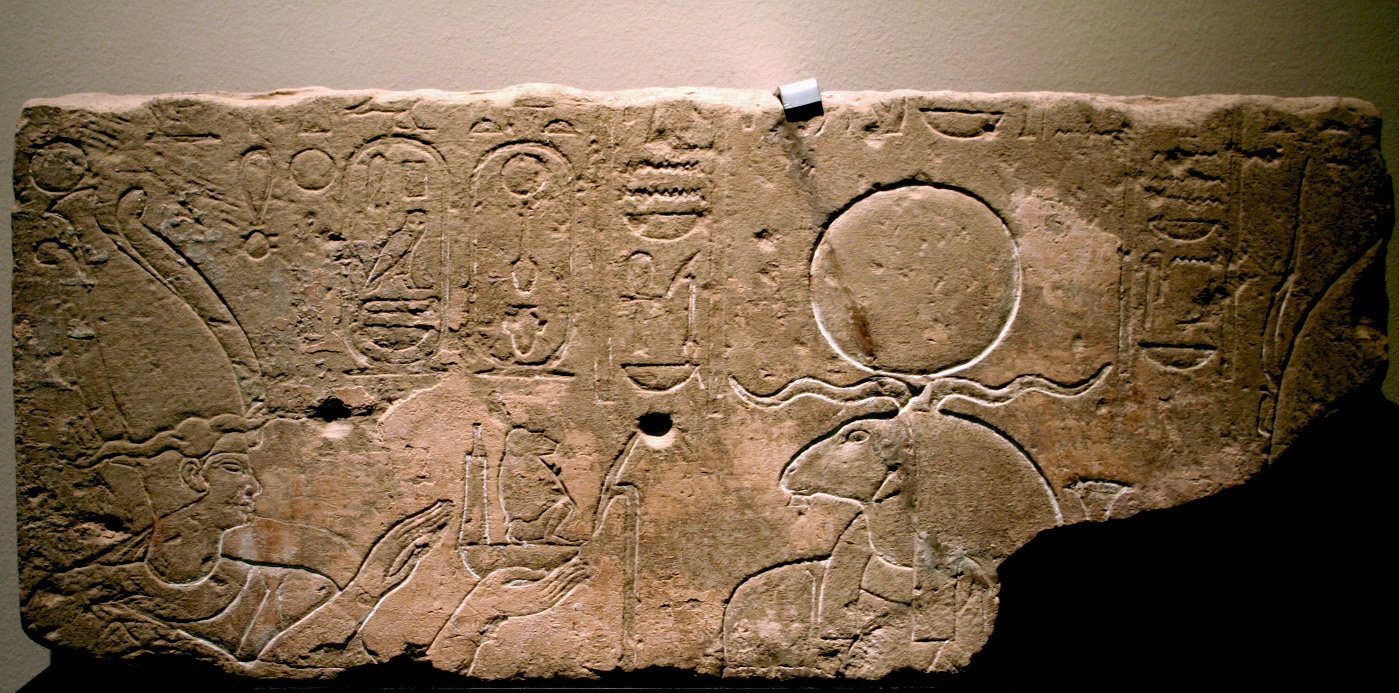
Psamtik II offers a sacrifice to the god Khnum wearing a solar disk (right).

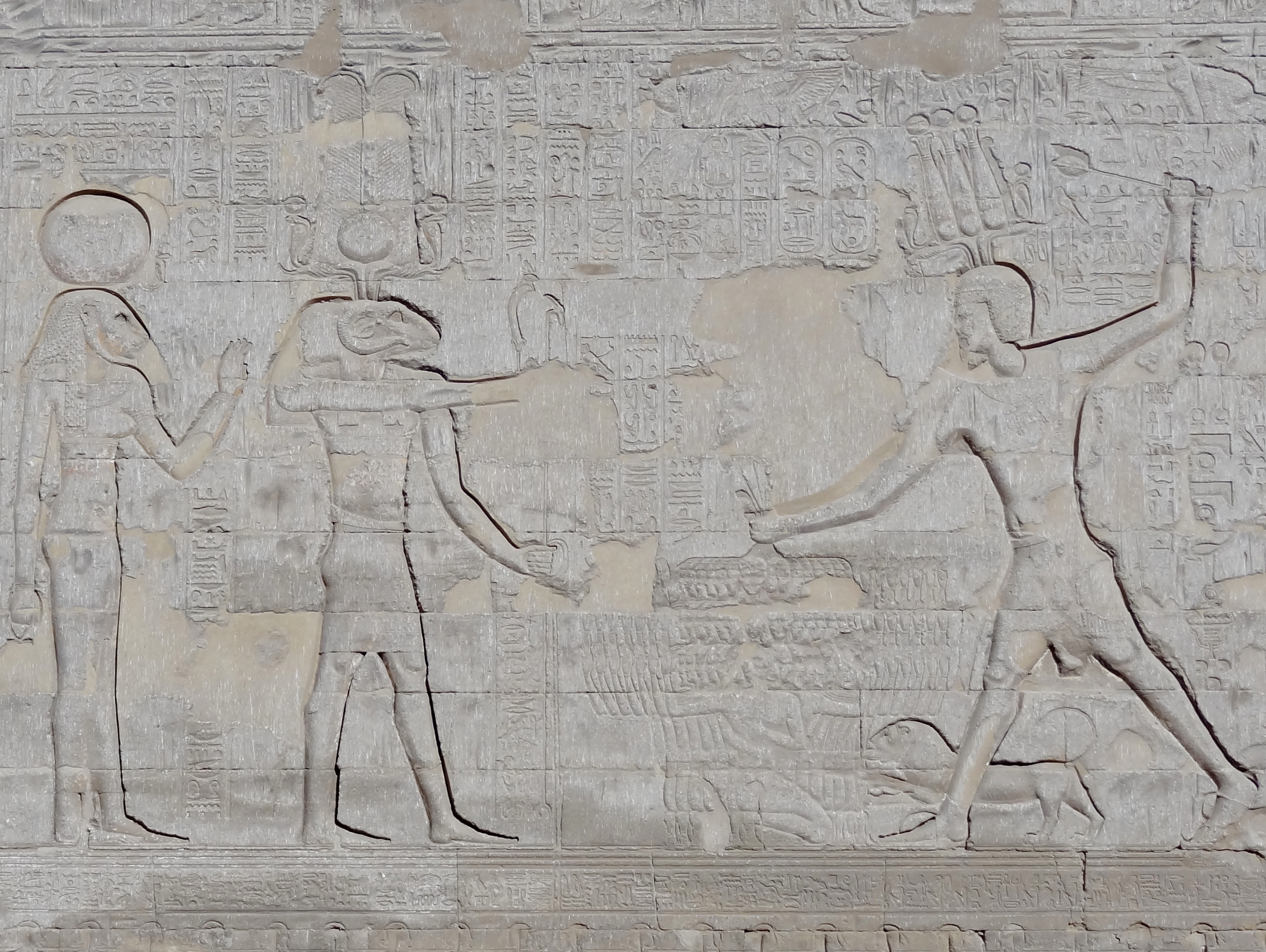
Emperor Domitian slays the country's enemies in front of Khnum and Menhit, southeast side of the Temple of Esna from Roman times, Egypt.

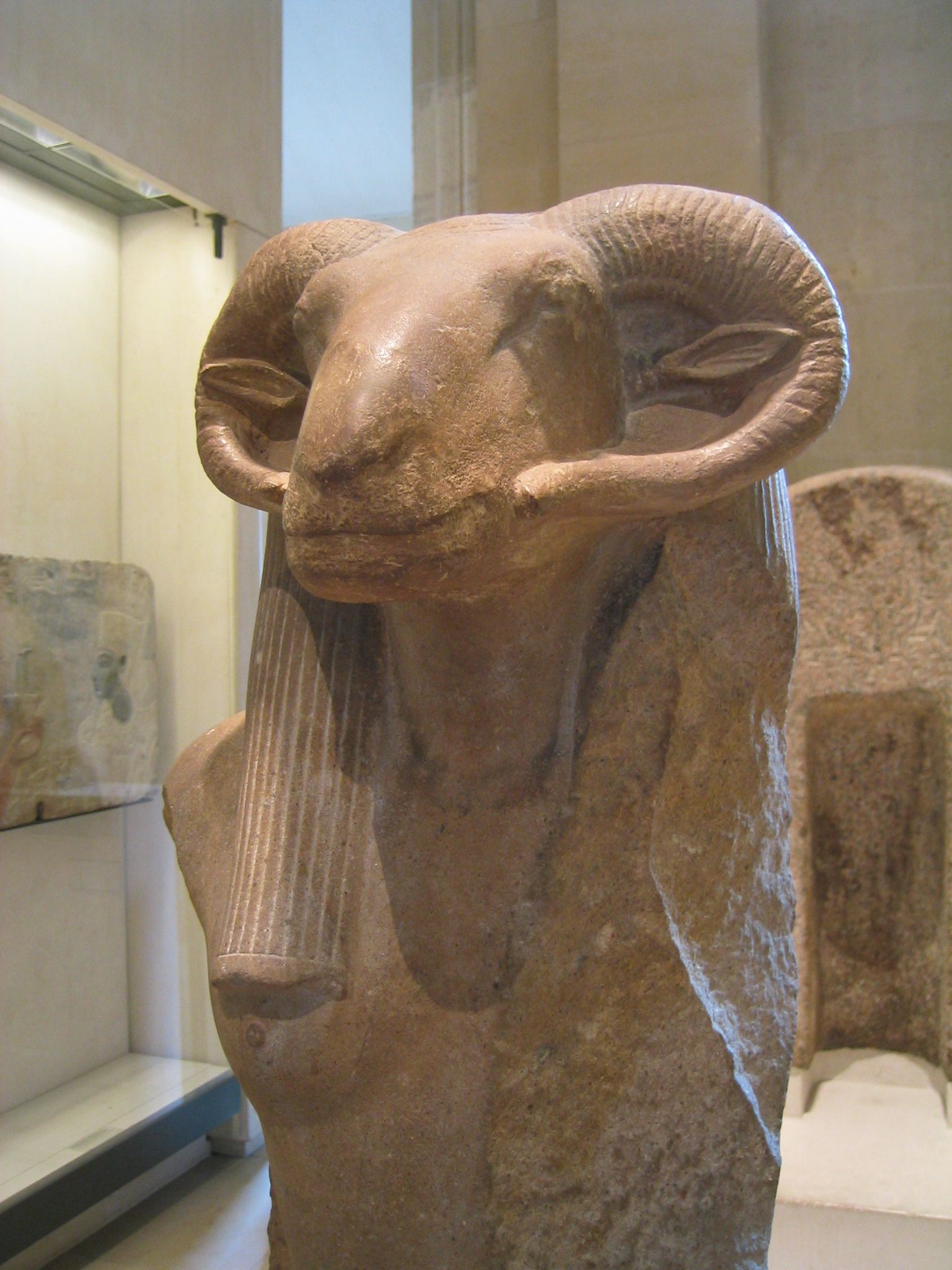
Seated statue of Khnum, 18th Dynasty, Louvre Museum, Paris, France.

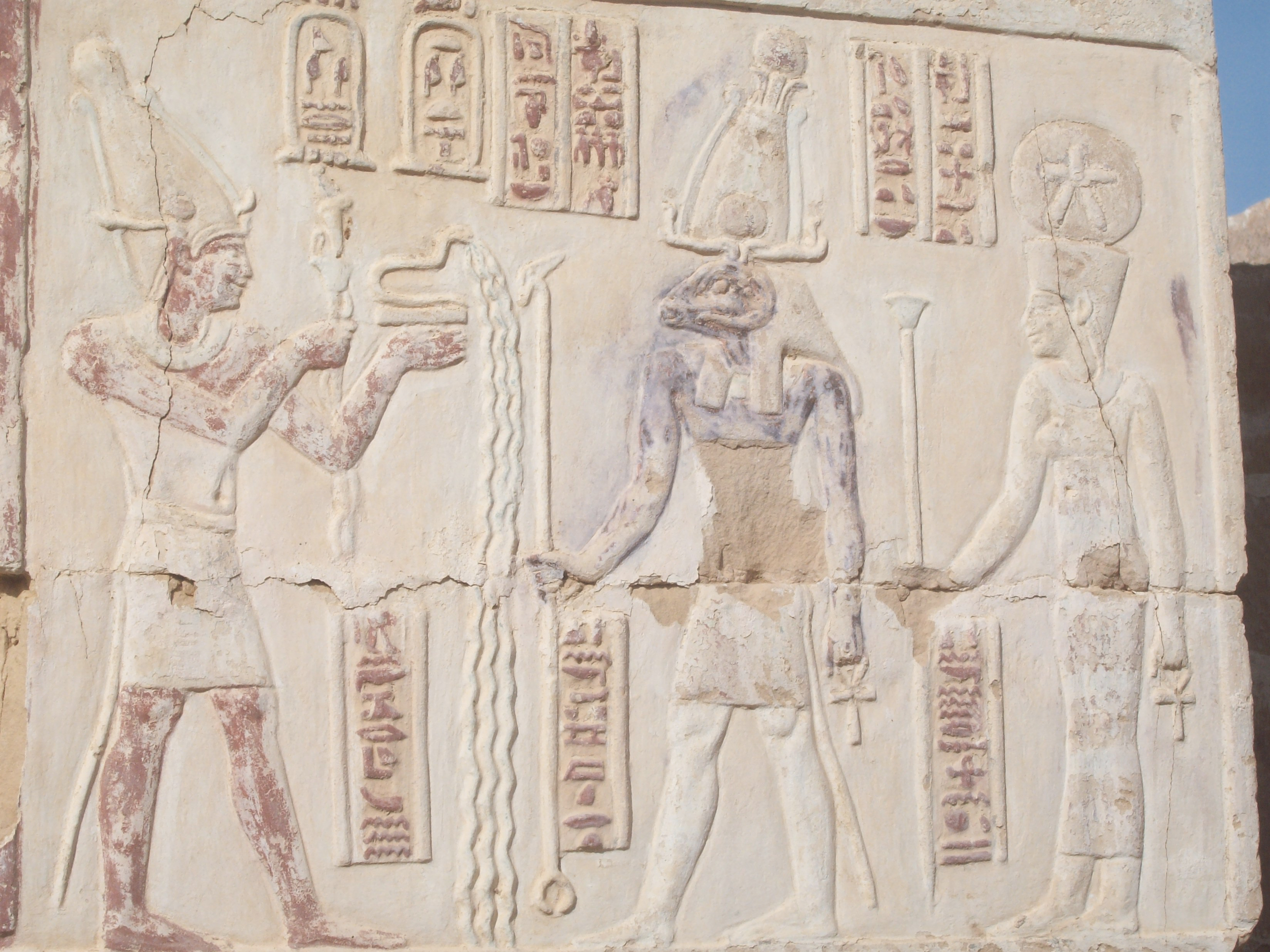
Relief at Deir el-Haggar depicting Titus (left) making an offering before Khnum (middle) and Satis (right).

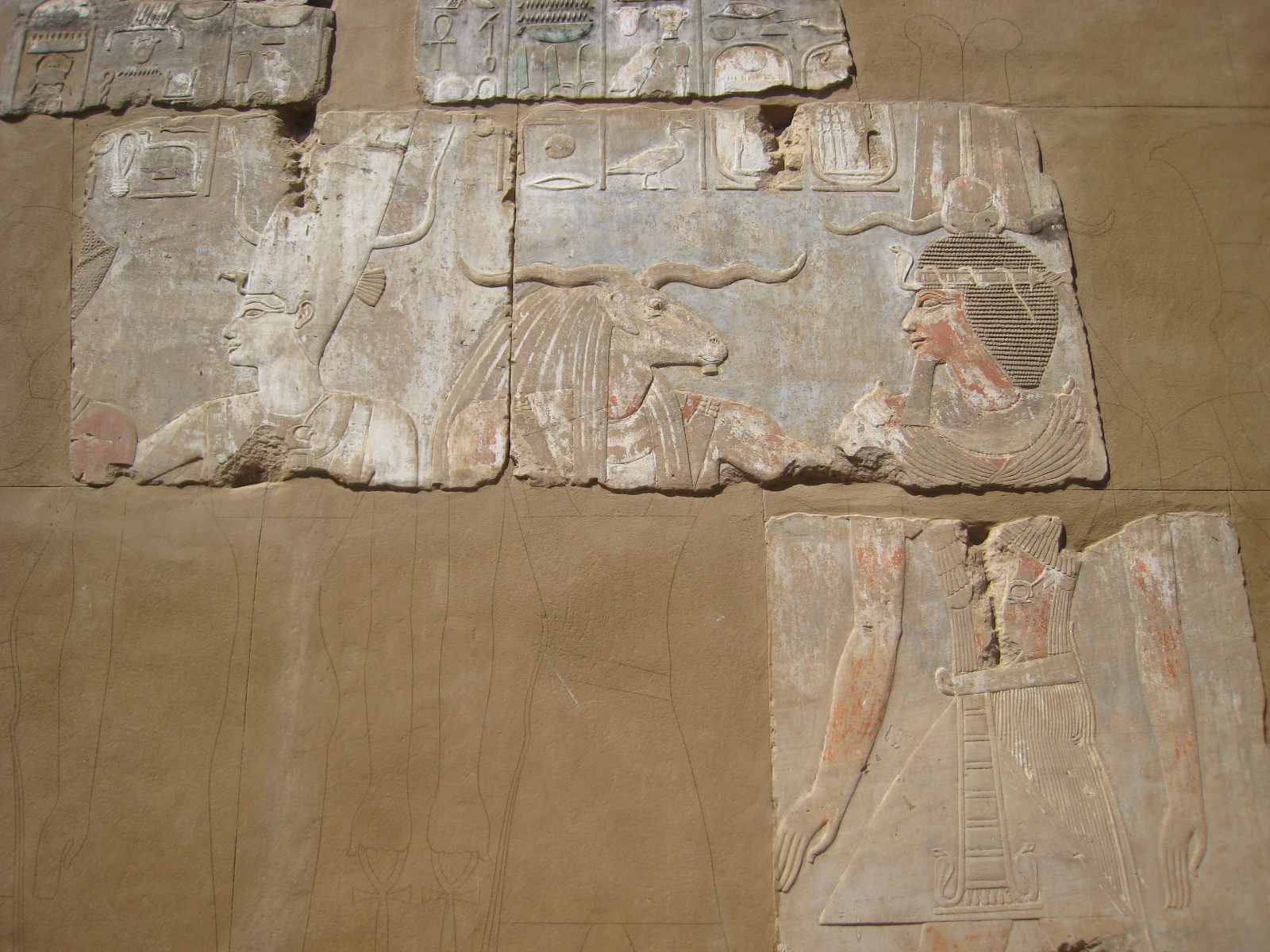
Painted relief of Thutmose I and Khnum in Elephantine Island.

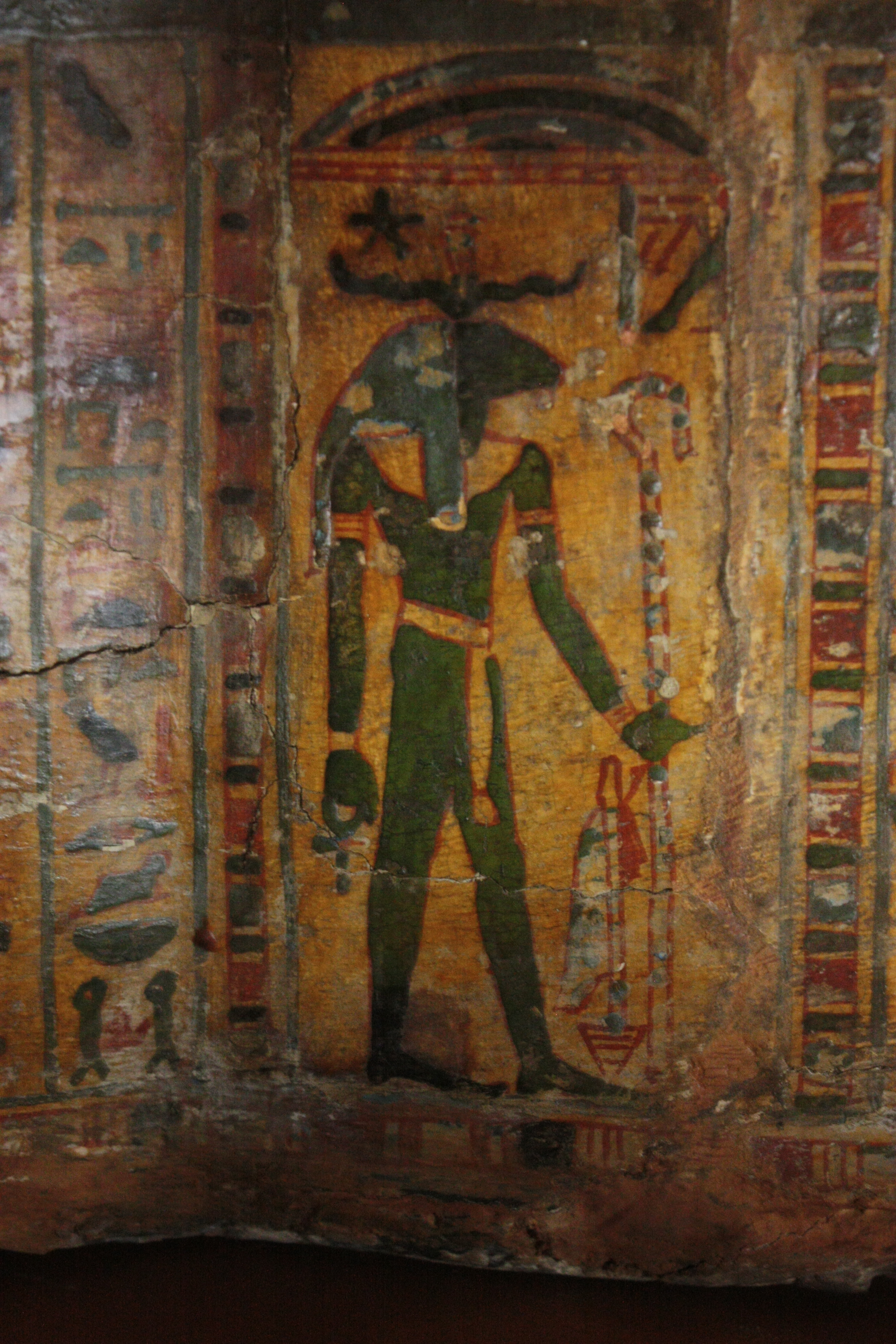
Khnum on the details of the sarcophagus of the mummy from the Perpignan Museum. The mummy is a priest-scribe of the temple of Amun-Re from the 21st dynasty named Iouef-en-Khonsou.

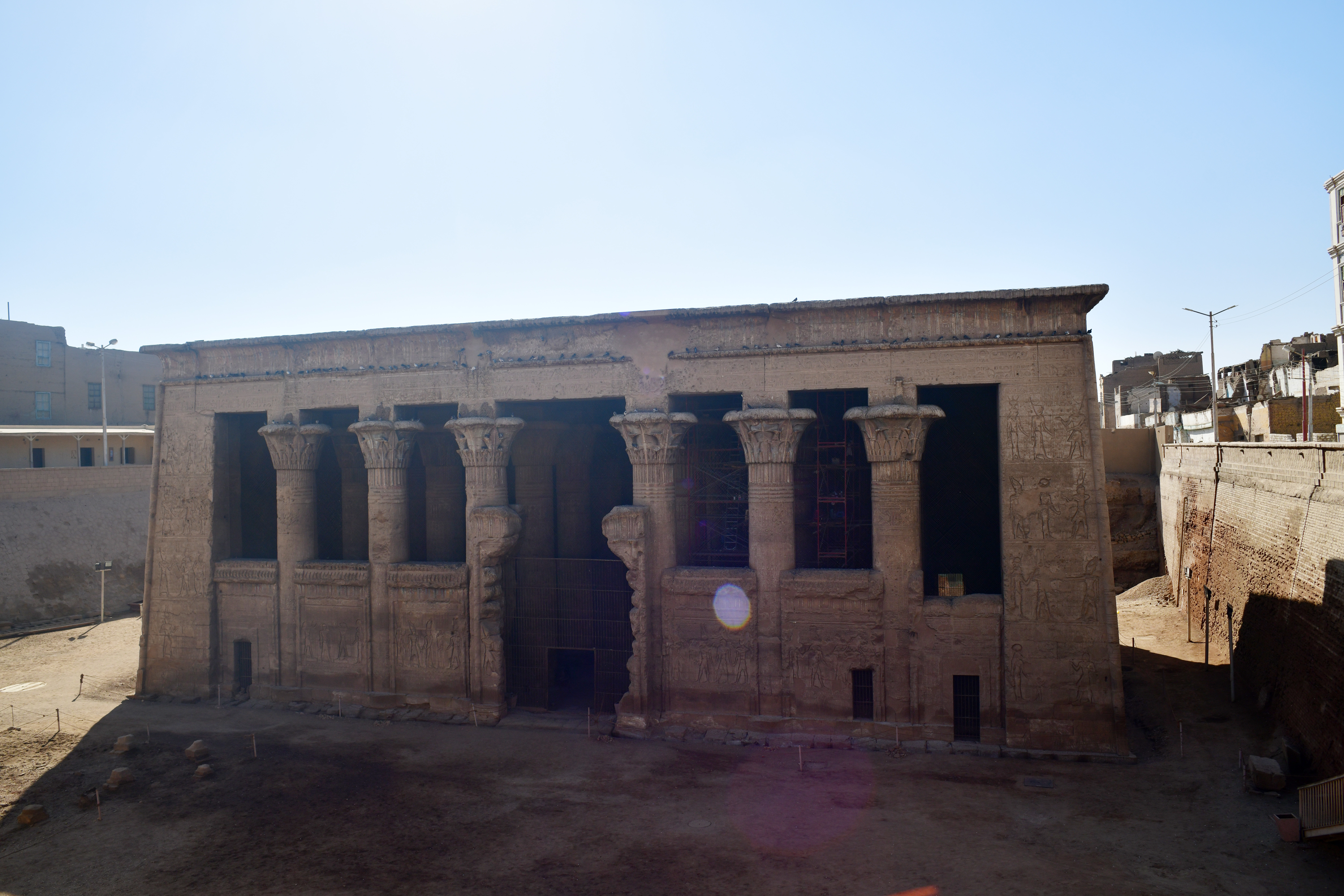
The Temple of Khnum at Esna.

== See also ==
- Banebdjedet
