= Heka (god) =

Ancient Egyptian deity

- Heka, depicted wearing a Hemhem crown and sidelock, carrying a crook and flail and ankh.
Name in hieroglyphs
Egyptian: ḥkꜣwH kA Y1 Z3 A40orF22 R12
- Major cult centre: Esna

Genealogy
- Parents: Khnum (father); Neith, Mehet-Weret, Menhit, or Nebetu'u (mother)

Heka (/ˈhɛkə/; Ancient Egyptian: ḥkꜣ(w); Coptic: ϩⲓⲕ hik; also transliterated Hekau) was the deification of magic and medicine in ancient Egypt. The name is the Egyptian word for "magic". According to Egyptian literature (Coffin text, spell 261), Heka existed "before duality had yet come into being." The term ḥkꜣ was also used to refer to the practice of magical rituals.

== Name ==
The name Heka is identical with the Egyptian word ḥkꜣ(w) "magic". This hieroglyphic spelling includes the symbol for the word ka (kꜣ), the ancient Egyptian concept of the vital life force. Due to the importance placed onto names in ancient Egypt Heka was often incorporated into personal names. Some examples include: Hekawy, Hekaf, or simply Heka. The goddess Isis is also sometimes affiliated with Heka being titled Weret Hekau, Great Lady of magic; Hekau which is heka in its plural form.

== Beliefs ==
The Old Kingdom Pyramid Texts depict Heka as a supernatural energy that the gods possess. The "cannibal pharaoh" must devour other gods to gain this magical power. Eventually, Heka was elevated to a deity in his own right, and a cult devoted to him developed.

=== Creation myth ===
Heka is said to have been created at the beginning of time by the creator Atum. According to the Egyptian cosmological belief their world was created through Heka. Heka was the primary force of life as a creative act according to the Egyptologist Ritner. Spell 648 of the Coffin Texts read:

“His powers put fear into the gods who came into being after him, his myriad of spirits is within his mouth. It was Heka who came into being of himself, at seeing whom the gods rejoiced, and through the sweet savor of whom the gods live, who created the mountains and knit the firmament together.”

=== General myths ===
Heka is later depicted as part of the tableau of the divine solar barque and as a protector of Osiris in Duat capable of blinding crocodiles.

Then, during the Ptolemaic dynasty, Heka's role was to proclaim the pharaoh's enthronement as a son of Isis, holding him in his arms.

Heka also appears as part of a divine triad in Esna, Ptolemaic and Roman capital of the Third Nome of the Thebaid of Upper Egypt, where he is the son of ram-headed Khnum and a succession of goddesses. His mother was alternately said to be Nebetu'u (a form of Hathor), lion-headed Menhit, and the cow goddess Mehet-Weret, before settling on Neith, a war and mother goddess.

Werethekau whose name means "she who has great magic" is also sometimes connected with the force of Heka.

As Egyptologist Ogden Goelet (1994) explains, magic in the Book of the Dead is problematic: The text uses various words corresponding to 'magic', for the Egyptians thought magic was a legitimate belief. As Goelet explains:

Heka magic is many things, but, above all, it has a close association with speech and the power of the word. In the realm of Egyptian magic, actions did not necessarily speak louder than words – they were often one and the same thing. Thought, deed, image, and power are theoretically united in the concept of Heka.

— O. Goelet (1994)

== Gallery ==
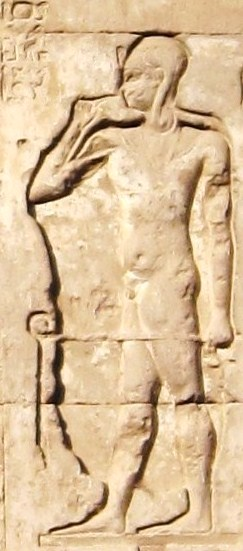
Relief of Heka at the Temple of Esna

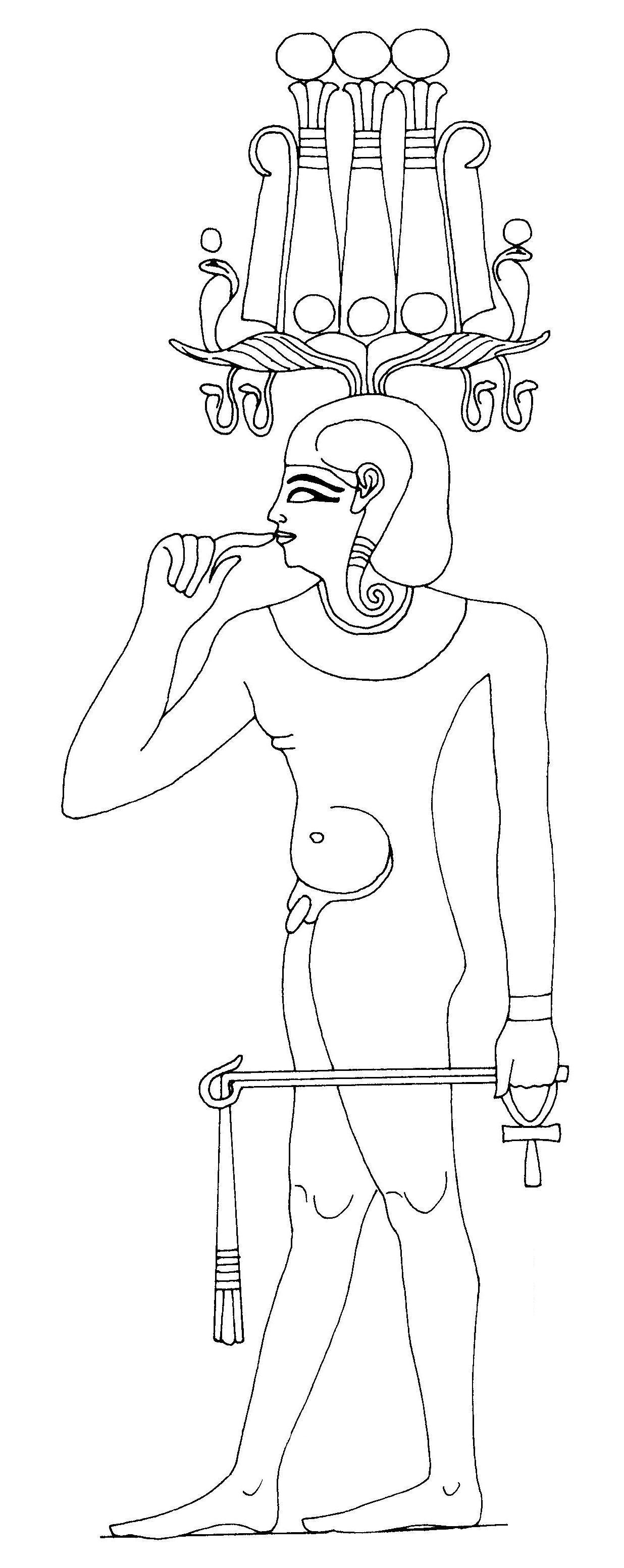
Heka (ḥkꜣ)

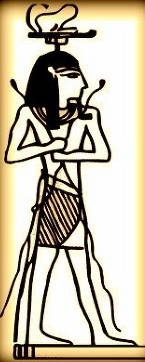
Heka, holding two serpents crossing each other with the hind of a lion on nome standard represent his name on his head in the magical form
