= Satis (goddess) =

Ancient Egyptian goddess

Name in hieroglyphs
S29 F29 X1 X1 B1 (Note: Variant representations of Satis include F29 X1 X1, F29 M17 M17 X1, S22 X1 X1, S29 V13 M17 S22 X1, and S29 V13 X1 F29 X1 A43.)
- Major cult center: Abu (Elephantine)
- Symbol: Hedjet crown; antelope; ankh; bow; arrow; flowing river; Sirius
- Parents: Ra
- Consort: Montu, Khnum, or Ra
- Offspring: Anuket

Satet, Satit or Satjet, Satjit in Ancient Egyptian (Ancient Egyptian: Sṯt or Sṯı͗t, lit. "Pourer" or "Shooter"), Greek: Satis, also known by numerous related names, was an Upper Egyptian goddess who, along with Khnum and Anuket, formed part of the Elephantine Triad. A protective deity of Egypt's southern border with Nubia, she came to personify the former annual flooding of the Nile and to serve as a war, hunting, and fertility goddess.

She was sometimes conflated with Isis and Sopdet, goddess of the bright star Sirius, which the Egyptians connected with the onset of the Nile flooding. Under the interpretatio graeca, she was conflated with Hera and Juno.

== Names ==
The exact pronunciation of Egyptian is often uncertain since vowels were not recorded until a very late period. In transcription, the goddess's name also appears as Setis, Sati, Setet, Satet, Satit, and Sathit. Derived from sṯ, meaning "eject", "shoot", "pour", or "throw", her name can be variously translated as "She who Shoots" or "She who Pours" depending on which of her roles is being emphasized.

Her name was originally written with the hieroglyph for a linen garment's shoulder knot (S29); this was later replaced by Anuket's animal hide pierced by an arrow (F29). She was also known by epithets, such as "Mistress of Elephantine" and "She Who Runs Like an Arrow", thought to refer to the flowing river current.

== History ==
A goddess of the Upper Egyptians, her cult is first attested on jars beneath the Step Pyramid of Saqqara (Dynasty III). She appears in the Pyramid Texts (Dynasty VI) purifying a deceased pharaoh's body with four jars of water from Elephantine.

Her principal center of worship was at Abu (Elephantine), an island in Aswan on the southern edge of Egypt. Her temple there occupied an early predynastic site shown by Wells to be aligned with the star Sirius. Other centers include Swenet (Aswan proper) and Setet (Sehel Island nearby). She was particularly associated with the upper reaches of the Nile, which the Egyptians sometimes considered to have its source near Aswan. She is invoked in Aramaic as Sati on a divorce document in the Elephantine papyri.

== Myths ==
As a war goddess, Satis protected Egypt's southern Nubian frontier by killing the enemies of the pharaoh with her sharp arrows.

As a fertility goddess, she was thought to grant the wishes of those who sought love.

She seems to have originally been paired with the Theban god Montu but later replaced Heket as the consort of Khnum, guardian of the source of the Nile. By Khnum, her child was Anuket, goddess of the Nile. After Khnum was conflated with Ra, she sometimes became an Eye of Ra in place of Hathor.

Together Khnum, Anuket, and Satis formed the Elephantine Triad.

== Representation ==
Satis was usually pictured as a woman in a sheath dress wearing the hedjet, the conical crown of Upper Egypt, with antelope horns. She is sometimes depicted with bow and arrows; holding an ankh or scepter; or offering jars of purifying water.

She also appears in the form of an antelope.

Her symbols were the arrow and the running river.

== See also ==
- Egyptian pantheon
- Elephantine, Aswan, & Sehel Island
