= Nebtuwi =

Egyptian goddess of fertility

Name in hieroglyphs
nb w N21 Z4 B1
nb.t-w.w
- Major cult center: Latopolis
- Consort: Khnum
- Offspring: Heka (in some myths)

Nebtuwi is an ancient Egyptian goddess personifying fertility, wife of Khnum. Her name translates as "the lady of the fields." The cult centre of her was Latopolis (also known as Esna). Functions of Nebtuwi were close to the functions of goddesses like Isis and Hathor. Subsequently, Nebtuwi's cult was gradually relegated to the cult of Neith. She was depicted as a lady with a vulture cap similar to the goddess Mut.
