= Ancient Egyptian corkscrew-horned sheep =

Type of sheep in ancient Egypt and Nubia

Modern depiction of the sheep variety "Ovis longipes palaeoaegyptiacus" based on ancient artwork

The ancient Egyptian corkscrew-horned sheep (Ovis longipes palaeoaegyptiacus) is a type of the extinct wild Barbary sheep found in the ancient southern Egypt and Nubia. The ovicaprines were domesticated and often depicted on the stone tomb murals of the pharaohs for religious or aesthetic purposes. O. l. palaeoaegyptiacus was one of the two most commonly domesticated sheep used on the reliefs of early pharaonic tombs, mostly because of its unique, loosely spiraling horns, which came out of the sides of the skull. A similar form of the sheep called Ovis platyura aegyptiaca had horns that developed downward and curled forward.

Later on, these two variants of sheep came to assume important religious significance, as well as domestic use. Herodotus recounts that early Egyptians did not wear wool, but some scholars argue that it was meant only for the priests and that archaeological evidence, including the body of a man wrapped in wool dating to the First Dynasty in a burial at al-Helwan, delineates this point. The use of this sheep is also unique in Egyptian depiction of their early deities. In fact, "the standard representation of Egyptian gods, were first developed, and naturally the ram-headed deities wore the horns of the then prevailing Ovis longipes palaeoaegyptiacus and retained them even long after the sheep itself had died out." The sheep disappeared from records by the end of the Middle Kingdom of Egypt (1782 BC).

The gods Banebdjedet of Lower Egypt and Khnum of Upper Egypt were both depicted with the head of a corkscrew-horned sheep.
