= Werethekau =

Ancient Egyptian deity

- Werethekau depicted with the head of a lion
Name in hieroglyphs
wr t H kA Z2 I12

Werethekau (Egyptian: wrt-ḥk3w "great one of magic, great enchantress"; alternately Urthekau, Weret Hekau, Wusa) was an ancient Egyptian and ancient Nubian deity. She served as the personification of supernatural powers.

== In myth ==
As a deity dedicated to protection, she often appeared on funerary objects, particularly weapons, to allow the deceased to protect him or herself against the dangers of the underworld. She also was placed on ivory knives as a charm to protect pregnant and nursing mothers.

Her power was one of the inherent qualities of the Crowns of Egypt. As goddess of the crowns she was a snake or a lion-headed woman and dwelt in the state sanctuary. As the wife of Ra-Horakhty she is depicted with his solar disk on her head. Werethekau was an epithet frequently conferred on Isis, Sekhmet, Mut, and others.

== See also ==
- Eye of Horus
