= Menhit =

Nubian war goddess

- Nubian lioness goddess of war and the Sun
Name in hieroglyphs
mn n H i i t I12
- Consort: Khnum
- Offspring: Heka

Menhit /ˈmɛnˌhɪt/ (also known as Menhyt, and Menchit) was originally a Nubian lion goddess of war in the Kingdom of Kush, who was regarded as a tutelary and sun goddess. Her name means either "she who sacrifices" or "she who massacres."

== History ==
Believed to have origins as a Nubian goddess, Menhit is always depicted as a lioness with solar disk and a uraeus symbol. Coffin texts associate her with being a tutelary and solar deity. Some sources identify her as the subject of the "Distant Goddess" myth. In one legend, the Eye of Ra flees from Egypt. Her counterpart, Ra, sends another god to track her down in Nubia, where she transforms into a lioness. When she is returned to Ra, she either becomes or gives birth to Menhit.

She also was believed to advance ahead of the Egyptian armies and cut down their enemies with fiery arrows, similar to other war deities. She was less known to the people as a crown goddess and was one of the goddesses who represented the protective uraeus on royal crowns.

== Cults ==
In the 3rd Nome of Upper Egypt, particularly at Esna, Menhit was said to be the wife of Khnum and the mother of Heka. She was also known to be the mother of Shu. She was also worshipped in Lower Egypt, where she was linked with the goddesses Wadjet and Neith. She became identified with another lioness goddess, Sekhmet.

== Literature ==
- Rolf Felde: Ägyptische Gottheiten. Wiesbaden 1995
- Hans Bonnet: Lexikon der ägyptischen Religionsgeschichte, Hamburg 2000; ISBN 3-937872-08-6
