= Anuket =

Ancient Egyptian goddess

- The goddess Anuket, depicted as a woman with a tall, plumed headdress
Name in hieroglyphs
a n q t B1
- Major cult center: Elephantine, Seheil
- Symbol: Bow, arrows, gazelle, ostrich feather
- Parents: Khnum and Satet

Equivalents
- Greek: Hestia
- Roman: Vesta

Anuket was the ancient Egyptian goddess of the cataracts of the Nile and Lower Nubia in general, worshipped especially at Elephantine near the First Cataract.

== Etymology ==
In ancient Egyptian, she was known as Anuket, Anaka, or Anqet. Her name meant the "Clasper" or "Embracer". In Greek, this became Anucis (Ανουκις), sometimes also spelled Anoukis or Anukis. In the interpretatio graeca, she was considered equivalent to Hestia or Vesta.

== History and roles ==
She was originally the daughter of Ra, but was always related to Satet in some way. For example, both goddesses were called the "Eye of Ra", along with Bastet, Hathor, and Sekhmet. Also, they were both related in some way to the Uraeus.

Anuket was the goddess of the Nile flood and a protective goddess of the southern border of Egypt. Her posing with her arms outstretched may have been a visual reference to the shape of the Nile, with its two tributaries, and influenced her being called "the Embracer". In the New Kingdom, her aspects as a southern goddess were emphasized to the point where one of her epithets was "the Nubian".

She was associated with swift moving water, and this was the reason for her association with papyruses.

== Worship ==
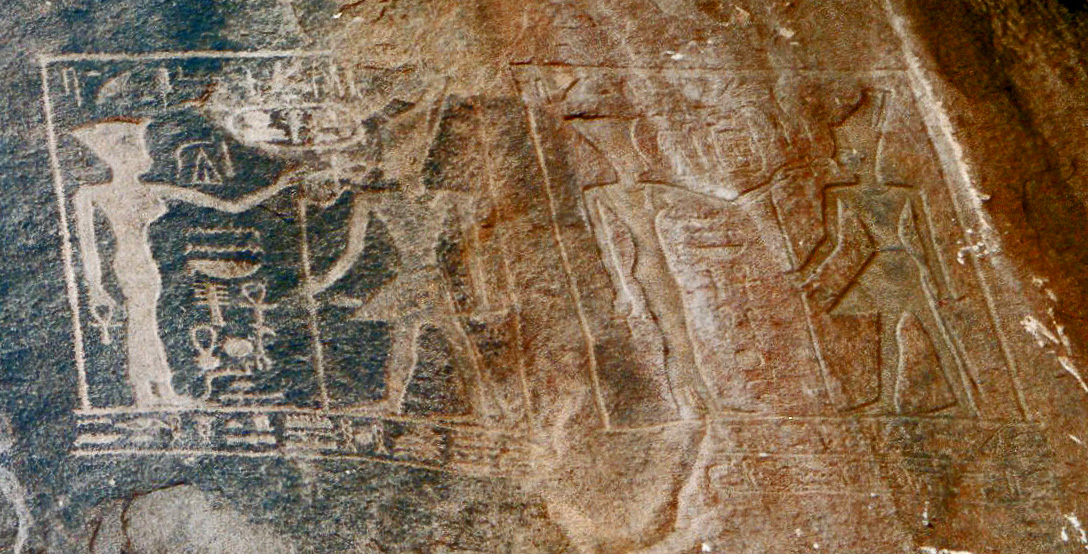
Reliefs of Senusret III and Neferhotep I making offerings to Anuket on Seheil.

Anuket was part of a triad with the god Khnum, and the goddess Satis. She may have been the sister of the goddess Satis or she may have been a junior consort to Khnum instead.

A temple dedicated to Anuket was erected on the Island of Seheil. Inscriptions show that a shrine or altar was dedicated to her at this site by the 13th Dynasty pharaoh Sobekhotep III. Much later, during the 18th Dynasty, Amenhotep II dedicated a chapel to the goddess.

During the New Kingdom, Anuket's cult at Elephantine included a river procession of the goddess during the first month of Shemu. Inscriptions mention the processional festival of Khnum and Anuket during this period.

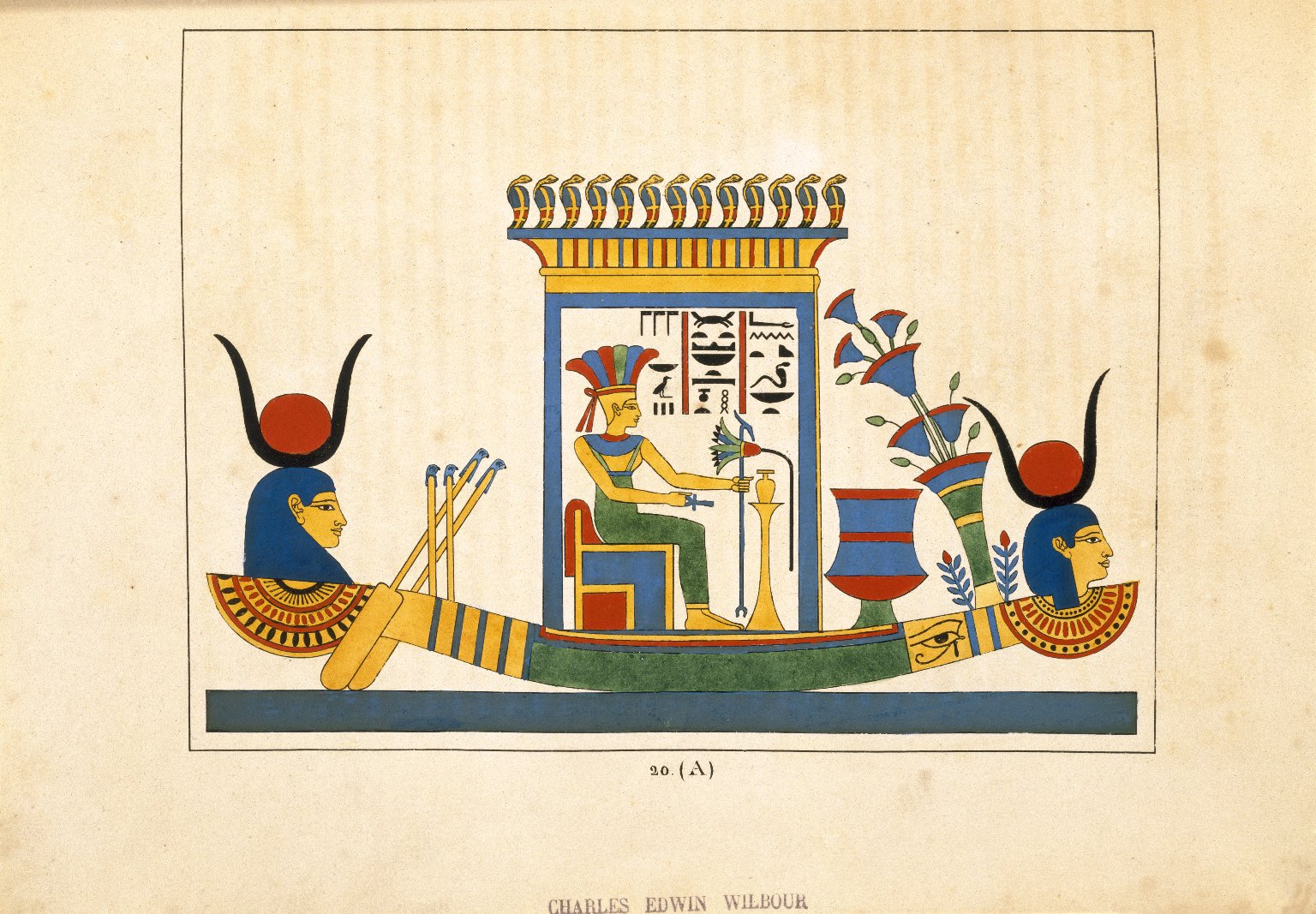
Anouké or Anouki (Anucè, Anucis, Istia, Estia, Vesta), N372.2, Brooklyn Museum

Ceremonially, when the Nile started its annual flood, the Festival of Anuket began. People threw coins, gold, jewelry, and precious gifts into the river, in thanks to the goddess for the life-giving water and returning benefits derived from the wealth provided by her fertility. The taboo held in several parts of Egypt, against eating certain fish which were considered sacred, was lifted during this time, suggesting that a fish species of the Nile was a totem for Anuket and that they were consumed as part of the ritual of her major religious festival. She was seen as bringing forth the flood.
