= Sehel Island =

Island in the Nile

Coordinates: 24°03′33″N 32°52′16″E

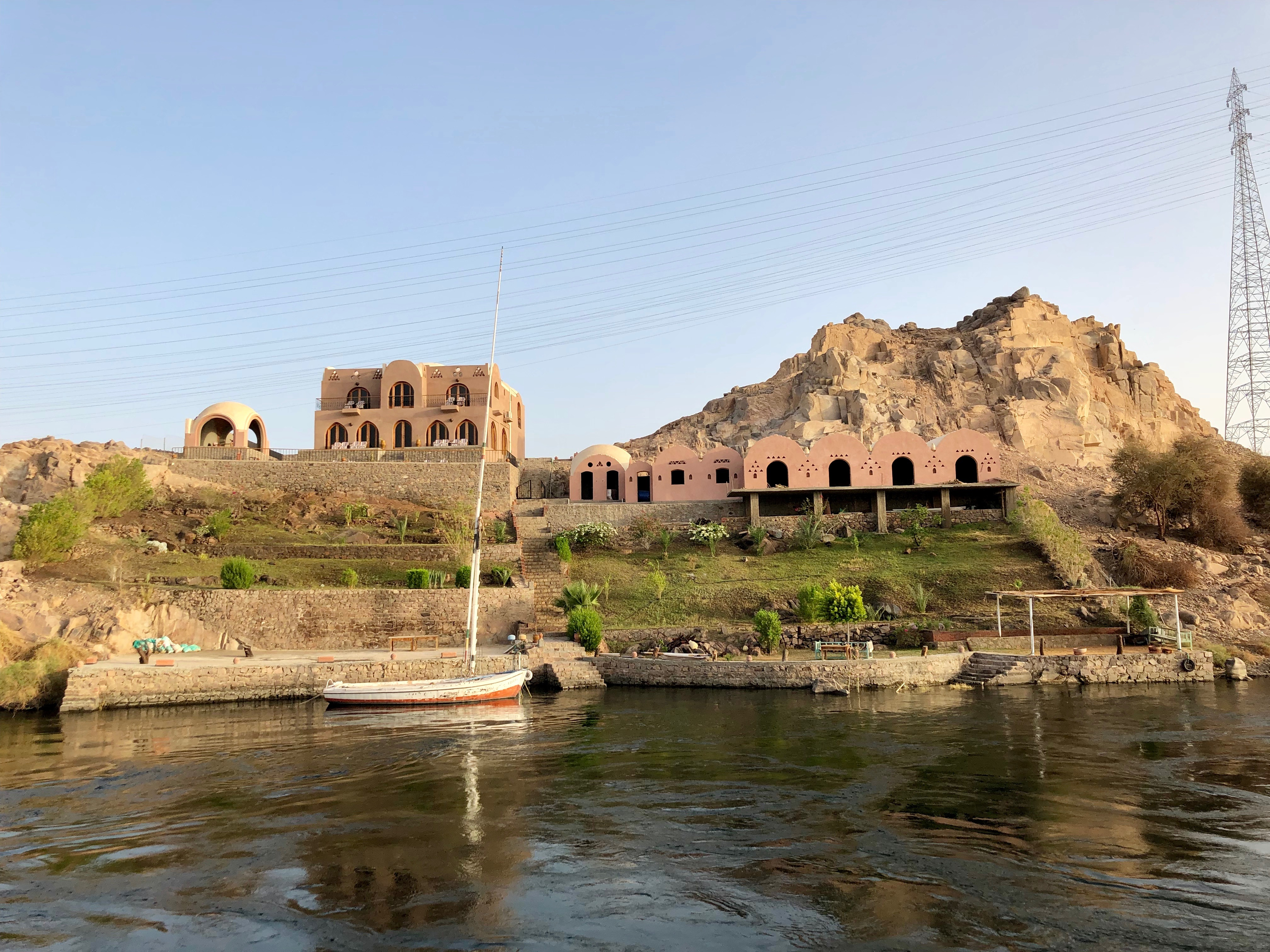
Seheil Island

Sehel Island in the Nile, below Aswan Low Dam.

Sehel Island (Ancient Greek: Σῆτις) is located in the Nile, about 2 miles (3.2 km) southwest of Aswan in southern Egypt. It is a large island, and is roughly halfway between the city and the upstream Aswan Low Dam.

== Geography ==
Sehel Island, spanning 3/4 the width of the Nile, is the primary large island below the Nile's First Cataract and the Aswan Low Dam (1902). Following downriver, the next major islands after Sehel are: Saluga, Ambunarti, Elephantine, and then Kitchener's Island. There are a dozen smaller islands scattered around them.

== Archaeological artefacts ==
s T t S22 niwtS22 t
sṯt
in hieroglyphs
Era: Old Kingdom
(2686–2181 BC)

S22 t t T14 xAst
sṯt(t)
in hieroglyphs

The island was known in ancient tiles as Setet, and there are many archaeological sites, including sacred places, such as the temple of Anuket, the Egyptian water goddess, and goddess of the Nile's cataracts.

Sehel was home to a stone quarry for granite used during various Ancient Egyptian eras, and there are many inscriptions in the island's granite boulders. These inscriptions were usually left by travellers marking either the start or end of their journey to Nubia. There are several famous inscriptions that record ancient historical events. One is the Famine Stela, which is of Greco-Roman origin, but claims to record events from the time of Djoser and Imhotep.

== Gallery ==
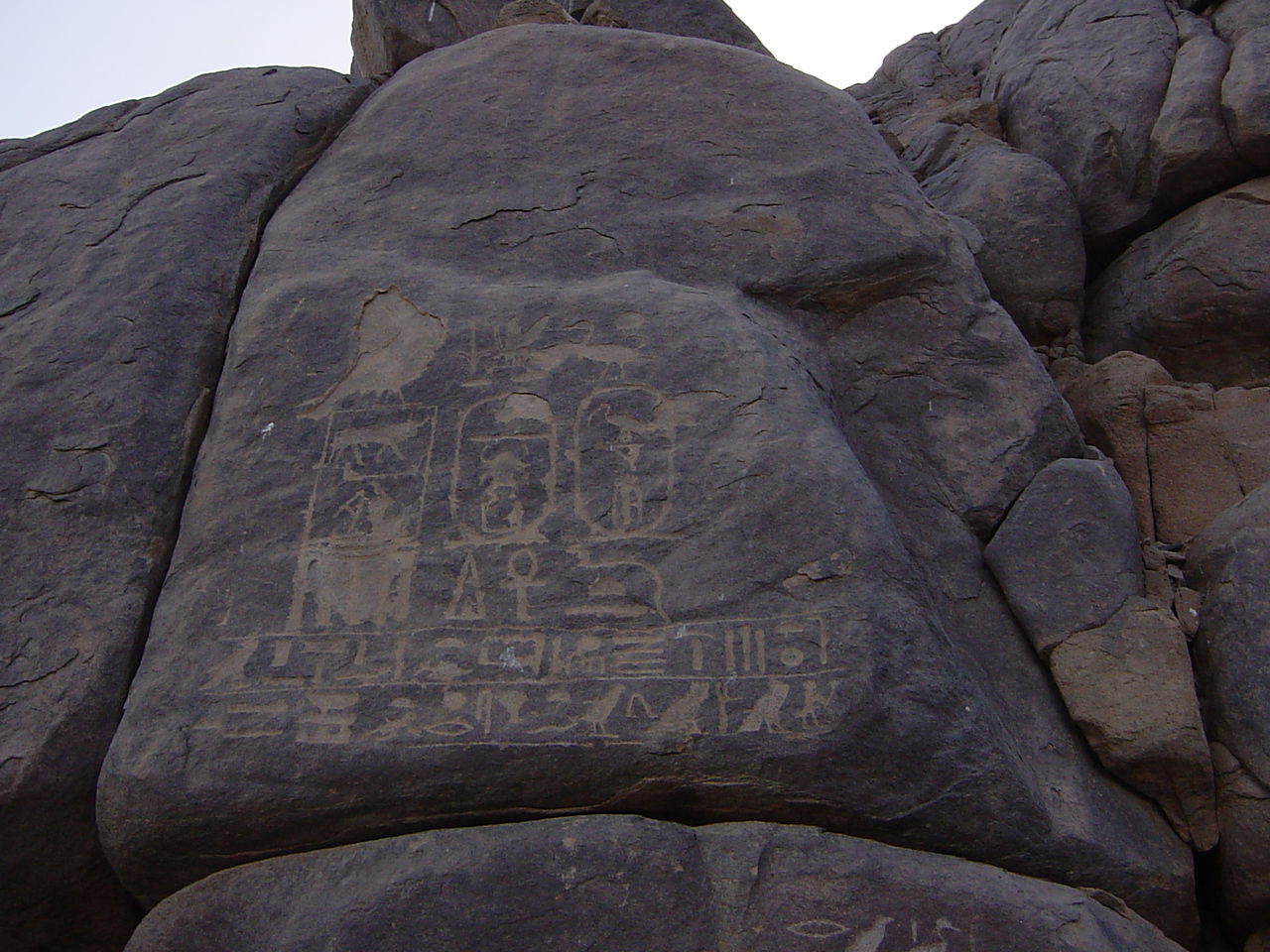
Sehel Inscriptions, in island's granite boulders.

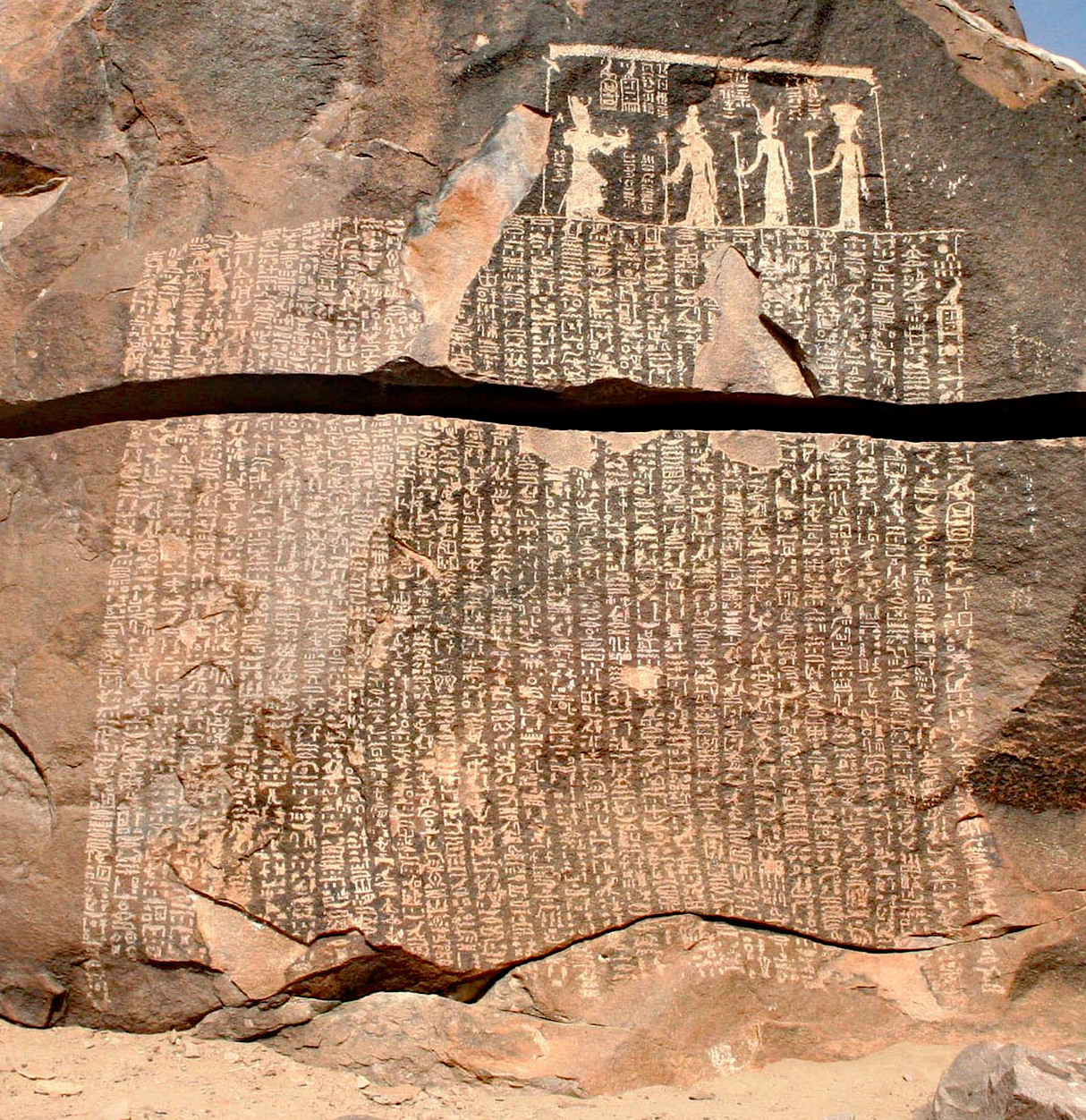
The Famine Stela, Sehel Island.
