= Minmose (overseer of granaries) =

Minmose was an Ancient Egyptian official under the ruling queen Hatshepsut. He was the overseer of the double granary. He is shown in the queen's mortuary temple at Deir el Bahari in a scene depicting the transport of two obelisks. and was therefore evidently involved in the erection of these monuments. He also appears on objects found in the burial KV60 of the nurse Sitre In who was buried in the Valley of the Kings. Minmose might have been buried close the temple of Hatshepsut at Deir el Bahari. There was found a burial in shaft tomb with the remains of a coffin belonging to a person called Minmose. The burial was already heavily looted in ancient times and reused in the 21st Dynasty.
