= KV60 =

Ancient Egyptian tomb in the Valley of the Kings

- Burial site of Sitre In and possibly Hatshepsut
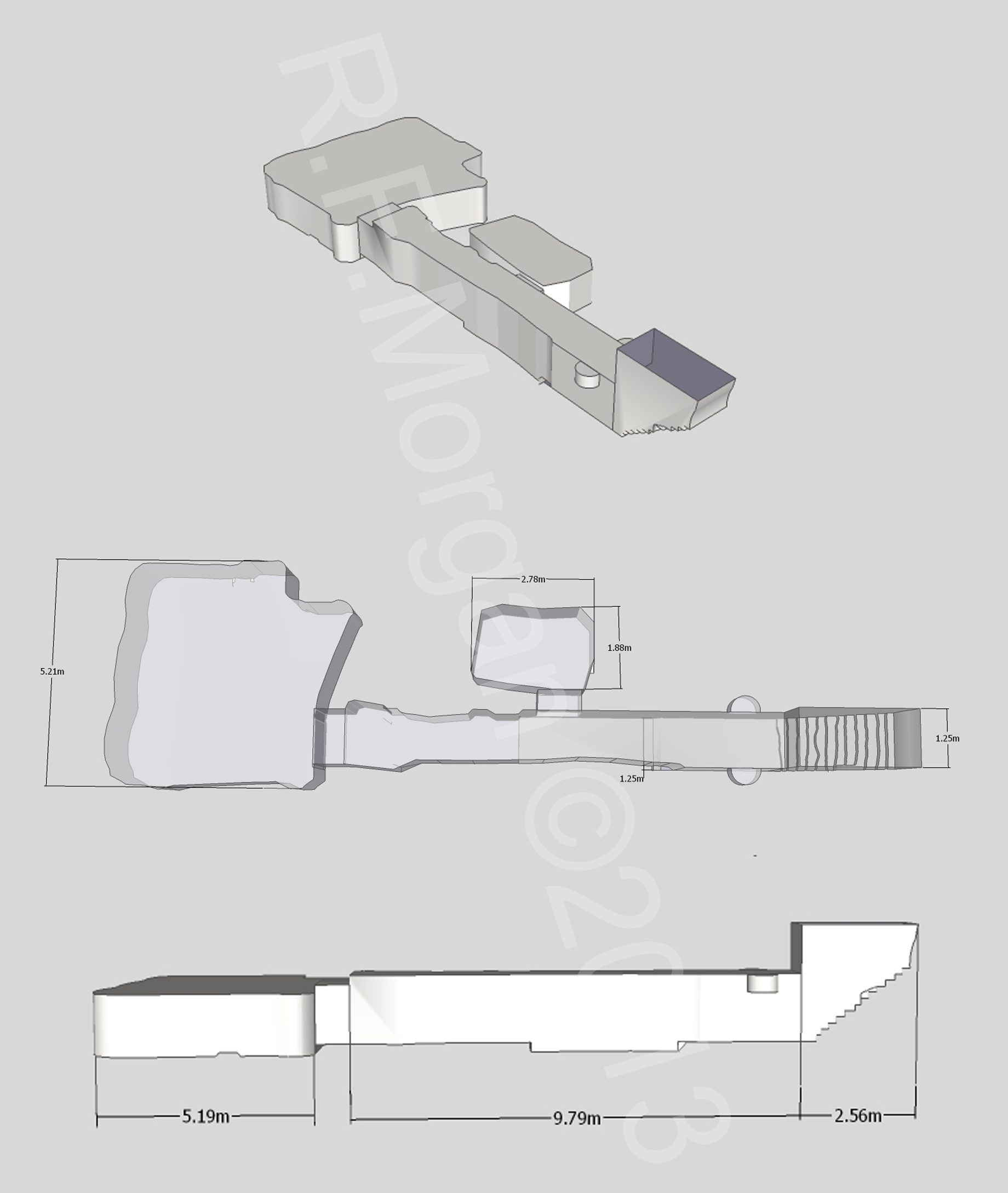
- Schematic of KV60

- Location within Egypt
- Coordinates: 25°44′20.6″N 32°36′11.3″E
- Location: East Valley of the Kings
- Discovered: 1903
- Excavated by: Howard Carter (1903); Edward R. Ayrton (1906); Donald P. Ryan (1989)
- Layout: Straight axis
- ← Previous; KV59 Next → KV61

Tomb KV60 is an ancient Egyptian tomb in the Valley of the Kings, Egypt. It was discovered by Howard Carter in 1903, and re-excavated by Donald P. Ryan in 1989. It is one of the more perplexing tombs of the Theban Necropolis, due to the uncertainty over the identity of one female mummy found there (KV60A). She is identified by some, such as Egyptologist Elizabeth Thomas, to be that of the Eighteenth Dynasty pharaoh Hatshepsut; this identification is advocated for by Zahi Hawass.

== Layout ==
This small, uninscribed tomb is located approximately 11.3 metres (37 ft) in front of the entrance of the tomb of Mentuherkhepshef (KV19). It consists of a rough, steep, flight of stairs leading to a doorway blocked with large stones. A pair of niches are cut into the wall just inside the entrance. A straight passage that is about 8 metres (26 ft) long descends to a low, roughly cut chamber which measures about 5.5 by 6.5 by 2 metres (18.0 ft × 21.3 ft × 6.6 ft) high. A small side chamber branches off about halfway down the descending corridor.

== Discovery and investigations ==
This tomb was discovered by Howard Carter in 1903 during excavations conducted by the Antiquities Service on behalf of Theodore M. Davis. The burial was found to have been ransacked in antiquity but still held two female mummies, one lying in the base of a coffin, and some mummified geese. Carter reclosed the tomb, only removing the geese.

In 1906, Edward R. Ayrton reopened it while clearing KV19; he removed one mummy (KV60B) together with the coffin base to the Egyptian Museum. Since neither Carter nor Ayrton drew plans or maps indicating the location of the tomb, its whereabouts became forgotten.

=== Re-excavation ===
In 1989, the tomb was rediscovered, reopened and properly excavated by a team from the Pacific Lutheran University Valley of the Kings Project led by Donald P. Ryan. They found the tomb corridor littered with assorted debris; in niches on either side of the door were piled broken pieces of funerary equipment, including the face of a coffin, its golden surface and inlaid eyes having been adzed off in antiquity. A wedjat eye was painted in each niche. An unwrapped piece of mummified meat sat on the doorstep of the small side chamber. This chamber, which was not noted by Carter, contained the discarded wrappings of the leg, which may have looked like a small human mummy when wrapped, and the limestone blocking that originally sealed the room's entrance. The burial chamber was found to be relatively clean, but was scattered with fragments of a burial. A pile of mummified food offerings sat opposite the entrance, and in the centre of the floor, still lay the lone female mummy (KV60A). Following mapping and excavation, she was placed in a new wooden coffin, and left in the tomb, which was resealed with a new metal door.

In 1993 the Project installed a crack monitor to measure the movements of cracks in the rock. In 2005, the fourteen victual mummies remaining in the tomb were investigated using x-ray analysis by Salima Ikram. The packets were revealed to contain the femur, humerus, foreleg, ribs, vertebrae, and scapula of a cow; a piece of liver; three birds; and three packets of rolled meat.

== Mummies ==
=== KV60A ===
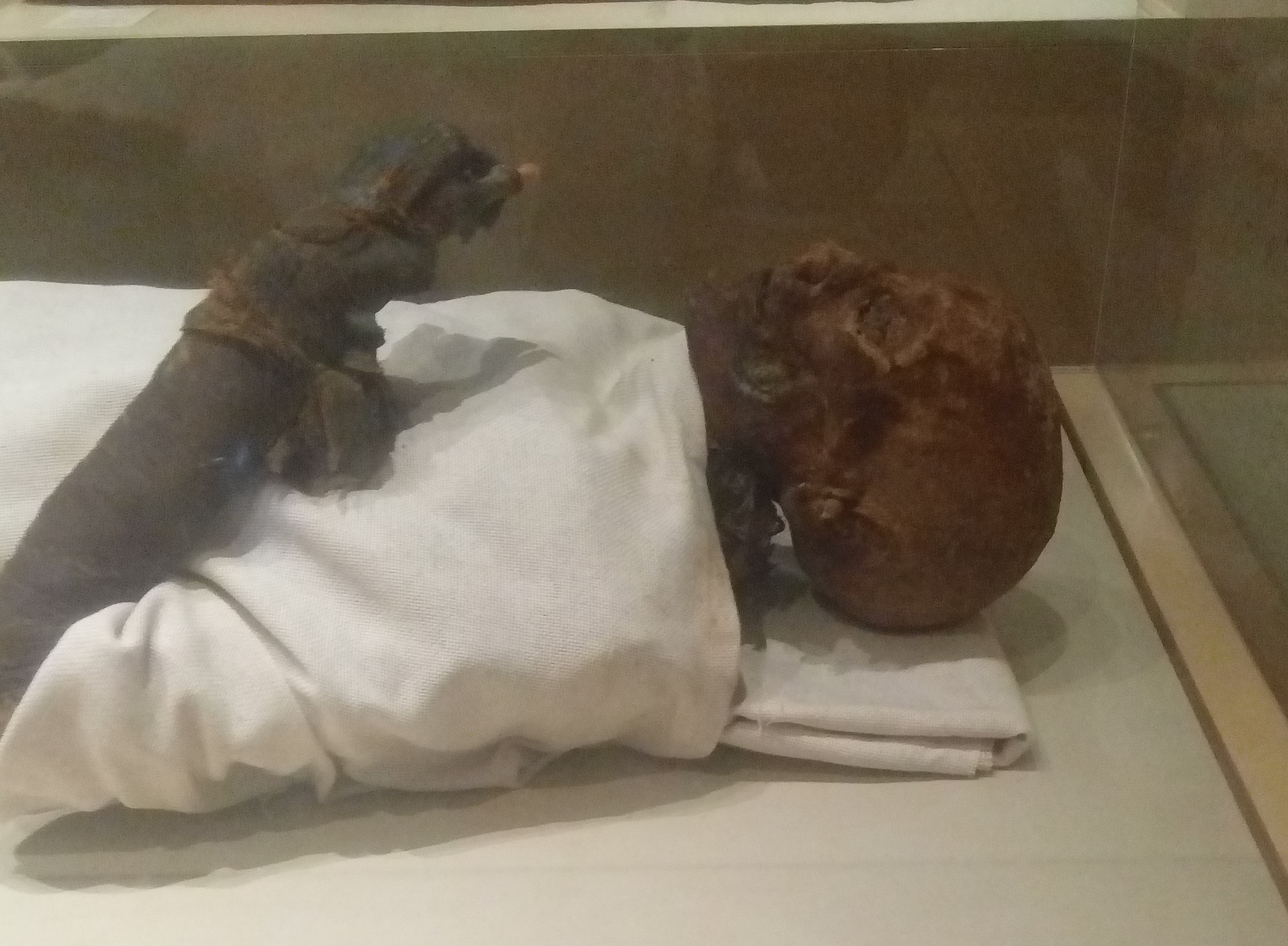
The KV60A mummy, thought to be that of Hatshepsut

This mummy is reasonably preserved, with a height of 159 centimetres (5.22 ft), and aged 50–60 years old at the time of her death. She was obese in life, and suffered from poor health; many of her teeth are missing or badly decayed, and a single root from a molar is retained in the jaw. This tooth appears to have been abscessed and extracted just before death. Her poor oral health combined with her weight may indicate she had diabetes. Her brain was not removed. Her heart is preserved in her chest and her torso is filled with embalming packs. She was eviscerated through the pelvic floor instead of through an embalming incision, perhaps due to her weight. Her left arm is crossed over her chest while the right arm is at her side. The fingernails of her left hand are tinted red and outlined in black. She may have had cancer: a tumor destroyed part of her left hip, and spread to her lumbar vertebrae. Her cause of death is assumed to be due to metastatic cancer, complications of diabetes, or an abscessed molar that was extracted shortly before her death.

Elizabeth Thomas was the first to propose that this mummy was that of Hatshepsut, relocated to the tomb of her nurse by Thutmose III, as part of his campaign of official hostility towards her. Ryan and Papworth's 1989 excavation produced evidence both in favour of, and casting doubt on the suggestion. On the supporting side, the mummy proved to be that of a relatively elderly lady, with her left arm flexed in the pose thought to mark royal women of the 18th Dynasty. On the other hand, few inscribed or dateable materials were recovered, meaning that a date range could not be firmly established. The wooden coffin face had a notch, presumably to take a false beard despite the fact that the tomb contained only women, and Hatshepsut is known to have used a false beard. Ryan felt, at that time, that advocating for KV60A as the mummy of Hatshepsut would be "foolishly premature", instead suggesting she could be any of a number of royal women or nurses from the period.

The identification of this mummy as Hatshepsut hinges on the contents of a wooden box inscribed with her cartouches discovered inside the cache DB320. When it was CT-scanned in 2007, it was found to contain a mummified liver and intestine, as well as a molar tooth that lacks one root. The tooth was found to match the size, shape, and density of the remaining molars, as well as lacking the same root that is still present in the jaw.

However, doubt has been cast on the validity of this attribution; the tooth may have been misidentified, and the match has yet to be confirmed by DNA testing.

A large resin-covered coffin fragment recovered from the burial chamber was found, when cleaned, to name a hitherto unknown temple singer called Ty. Ryan suggests in his retrospective that, given the concerns over the accuracy of the identification of KV60A as Hatshepsut, it may have been readily accepted that the tomb belonged to a royal nurse and a singer if Elizabeth Thomas had not suggested Hatshepsut as one of the occupants.

=== KV60B ===
This well-preserved mummy is about 1.5 metres (4.9 ft) tall. She has long red hair remaining on her head. Her right arm at her side, and the left arm is placed across her torso; the left hand is closed. She was eviscerated through a V-shaped embalming incision. Traces of fine linen bandages remain, with the fingers individually wrapped. Robbers looking for valuables have torn away much of the bandaging, which is bundled at the bottom of the coffin. She was once thought by Hawass to be the mummy of Hatshepsut.

The 2.13 metres (7.0 ft) coffin base she was found lying in was inscribed with the name and title wr šdt nfrw nswt In, meaning the Great Royal Nurse, In. This personage has been widely identified with Sitre In, the royal nurse of Hatshepsut, who is known from her sandstone statue from Deir el Bahari.
