= Minmose =

Minmose in hieroglyphs
R22 R12 ms
mnw–ms
Minmose ("Born of Min")

Minmose was an ancient Egyptian personal theophoric name. Some notable bearers were:

- Minmose (overseer of works) during the 18th Dynasty
- Minmose (overseer of granaries) during the 18th Dynasty
- Minmose (high priest) during the 19th Dynasty
