= Corinna Rossi =

Italian Egyptologist

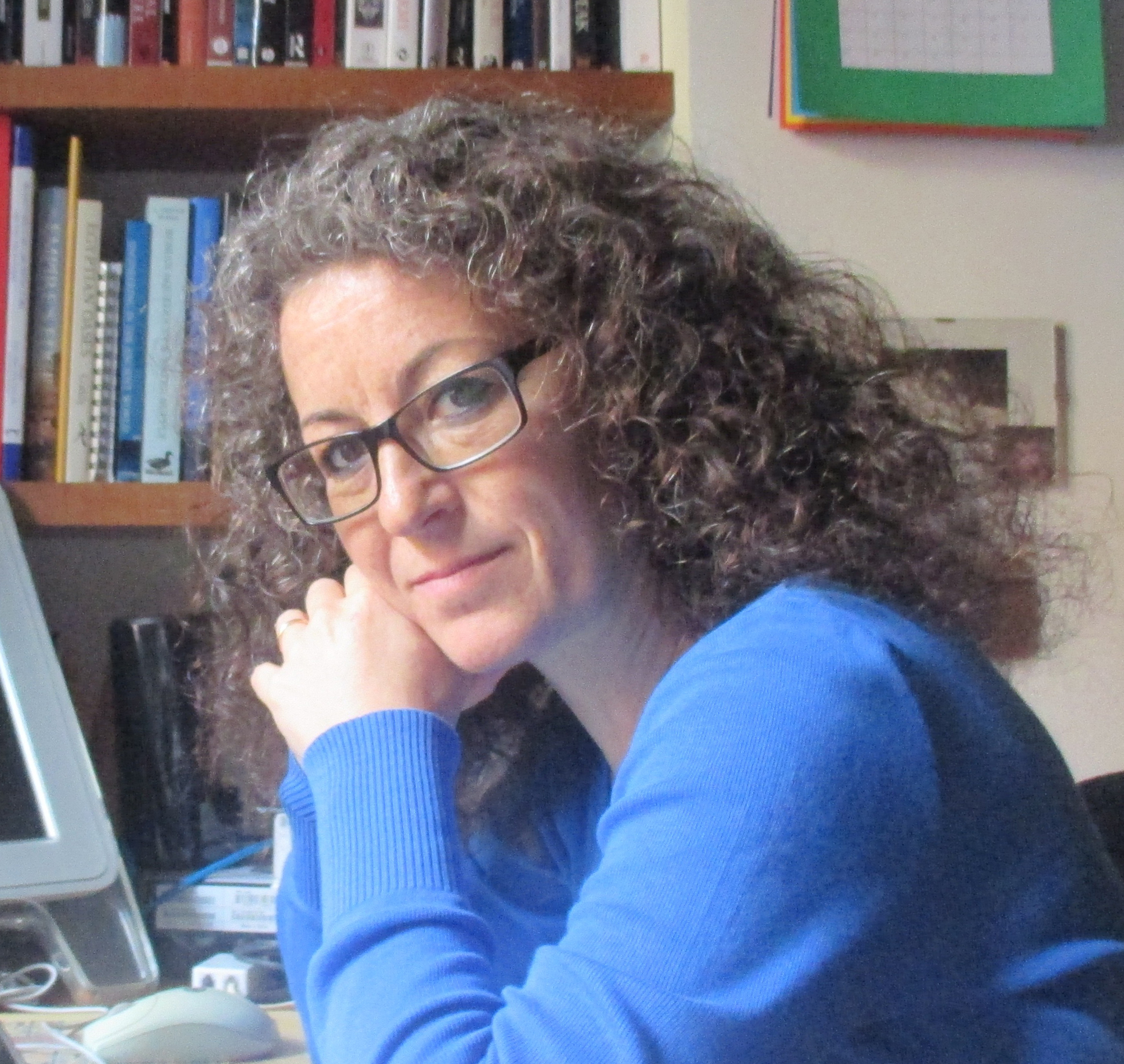
Corinna Rossi 2016

Corinna Rossi (born 1968) is an Italian Egyptologist known for her works on Ancient Egyptian mathematics and Ancient Egyptian architecture, on the archaeology of the Kharga Oasis, and on related topics in the history of Egypt and the Levant.

== Biography ==
Rossi was born in 1968 in Naples. She studied architecture at the University of Naples Federico II beginning in 1989, earning a laurea in 1994, and then moved to the University of Cambridge for graduate study in the Faculty of Oriental Studies, where she earned an M.Phil. in 1998 and a Ph.D. in 2000 in Egyptology under the supervision of Barry J. Kemp. She continued as a Junior Research Fellow of Churchill College, Cambridge. She moved back to Italy in 2004 and became Head of International Exchanges at the Collegio di Milano. In 2015 she moved to the Polytechnic University of Milan, where she is Associate Professor of Egyptology in the Department of Architecture, Built Environment, and Construction Engineering.

== Projects and scientific activity ==
She was a member of the British Mission to Tell al-Amarna from 2000 to 2003. Since 2019 is a member of the Dutch-Italian Mission to Saqqara of Museo Egizio, Turin and Rijksmuseum van Oudheden, Leiden (since 2019) and since 2020 also of the joint IFAO-Museo Egizio mission to Deir al-Medina From 2001 to 2006 she co-directed the North Kharga Oasis Survey project with Salima Ikram and is the Director of the Italian archaeological mission to Umm al-Dabadib (Kharga Oasis) since 2014.

== Books ==
Rossi's books include:

- Architecture and Mathematics in Ancient Egypt (Cambridge University Press, 2003).
- The Pyramids and the Sphinx: Art and Archaeology (The American University in Cairo Press and White Star Publishers, 2005)
- The Treasures Of the Monastery Of Saint Catherine (The American University in Cairo Press and White Star Publishers, 2006)
- North Kharga Oasis Survey: Explorations in Egypt’s Western Desert (co-authored with Salima Ikram, Peeters, 2018)
- Innovative Models for Sustainable Development in Emerging African Countries (edited with Niccolò Aste, Stefano Della Torre, Cinzia Talamo, and Rajendra Singh Adhikari, Springer, 2020)
- Egypt, Greece, and Rome. A History of Space and Places (Routledge, 2022).
