= Speos Artemidos =

Archaeological site in Minya Governorate, Egypt

Coordinates: 27°54′N 30°52′E

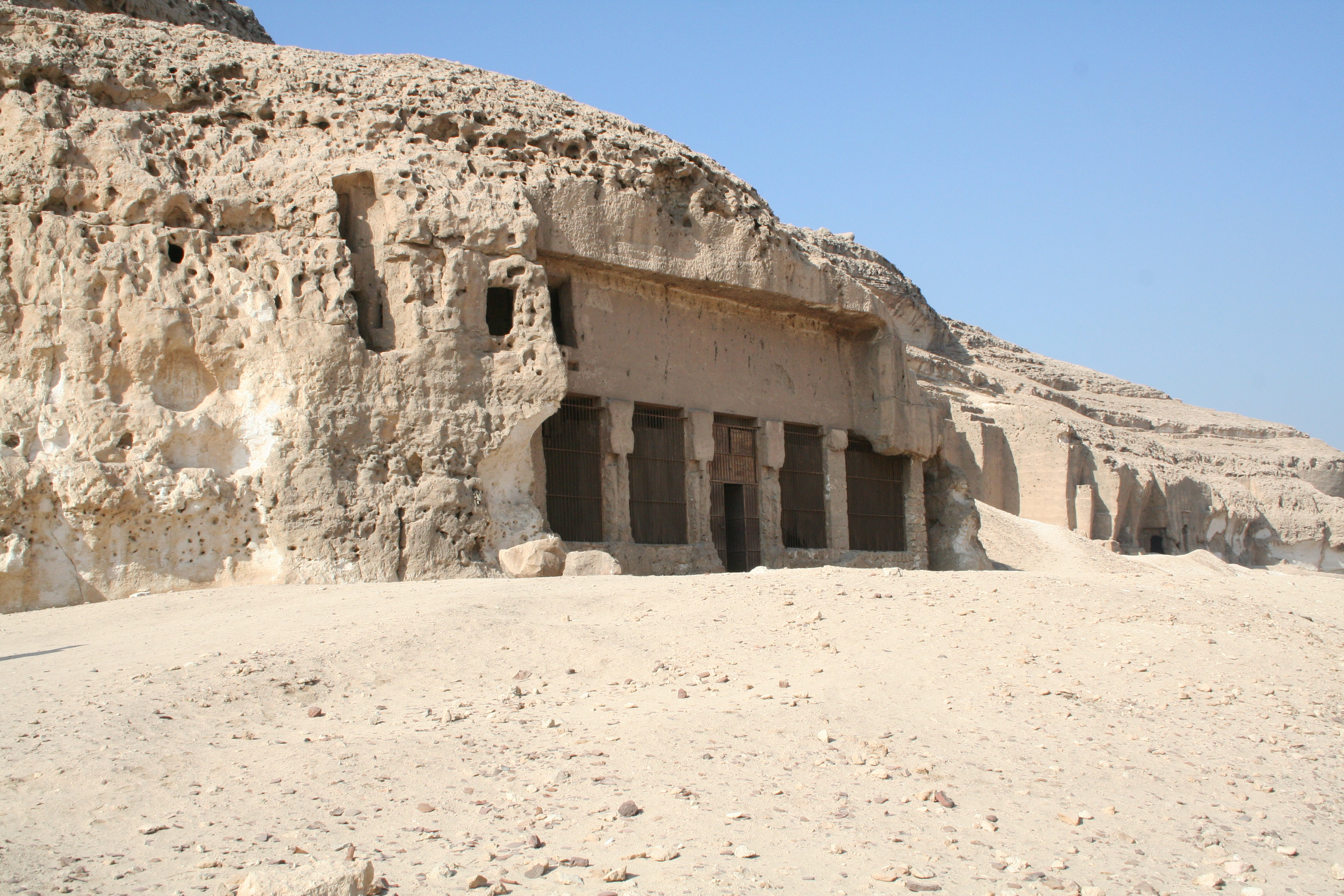
Speos Artemidos

The Speos Artemidos (Ancient Greek: Σπέος Αρτέμιδος; meaning, Grotto of Artemis) is an archaeological site in Egypt. It is located about 2 km south of the Middle Kingdom tombs at Beni Hasan in the wadi Batn al-Baqara, Egypt. Today, the area in known by the name Istabl Antar. The site was once a limestone quarry. The temple was dedicated to the goddess Pakhet and was commissioned by Hatshepsut, a female pharaoh. She ruled about 20 years during Egypt's 18th dynasty. The temple was the first rock-cut temple and contains inscriptions exemplifying Hatshepsut's reign. Seti I made changes to the temple years later.

== Location and history ==
The area was used for quarrying limestone in the Old Kingdom and start of the New Kingdom. The quarries were part of a larger area near Beni Hasan, long before the temple was built.

The temple was dedicated to the goddess Pakhet, who was associated with hunting and protection. The Greeks later connected Pakhet with their goddess Artemis, which is where the name Speos Artemidos derives from. The temple was built as a place of worship and not built as a tomb for Hatshepsut.

== Hatshepsut's Temple ==
Speos Artemidos was the first temple cut out of the living rock, unlike many Egyptian temples that were constructed out of blocks of stone. Hatshepsut's temple is composed of two chambers connected by a short passageway. The outer portico is rectangular and originally had eight stone columns arranged in two rows. Only three of the four columns forming the facade are still relatively intact and none of the internal pillars remain. The rough pillars suggest that the temple was unfinished. The North faces of the pillars show that Hathoric sistrum-columns were intended to be attached to them, but only their outlines were cut; the south faces retain very crude preliminary sketches of Osirian figures.

== Exterior Inscriptions ==
In 1943, H.W Fairman and Bernhard Grdseloff went to Speos Artemidos in order to study the temple's inscriptions. The inscriptions are important because they explain why Hatsheput had the temple built, as well as the changes that were made by Pharaohs after her. The rock face above the external pillars of the portico is dressed and inscribed with text bearing Hatsheput's name. It includes the famous text in which she denounces the Hyksos and records her actions in rebuilding the damage they had caused thus legitimizing her own reign.

== Interior Inscriptions ==
Within the portico only the southern wall bears any inscription. The text originally referred to Hatshepsut but was usurped by Seti I who also added further dedications. The smaller inner sanctuary is square with a statue niche at the back. It was not inscribed by Hatshepsut and Brand has suggested that it was in fact Seti who first excavated the passageway and sanctuary.

Interior Inscriptions

== Archaeological Research ==
Speos Artemidos has been studied for many years. In 1943, H.W Fairman and Bernhard Grdseloff went to Speos Artemidos in order to study the temple's inscriptions. Their research was not the first of the temple, it was the first to record the inscriptions of the temple. Their findings provided information of the temple as well as changes made by later pharaohs.

== Changes Made by Seti I ==
Seti I made several changes to Speos Artemidos. He replaced Hatshepsut's name with his own and changed representations of the Queen to depictions of himself. There is some debate over who was responsible for the damage. Brand argues that some of the damage was originally caused by Thutmose III and later repaired by Seti I. Seti I replaced other inscriptions and images of Hatshepsut's reign with images of himself and religious beliefs instead.
