= Elizabeth Thomas (Egyptologist) =

American egyptologist

- Born: March 29, 1907; Memphis, Tennessee
- Died: November 28, 1986 (aged 79); Jackson, Mississippi
- Education: B.A. University of Mississippi (1937), M.A. University of Chicago (1948)
- Alma mater: University of Mississippi University of Chicago
- Occupation: Egyptologist
- Known for: Egyptologist

Elizabeth Mary Thomas (March 29, 1907 – November 28, 1986) was an American Egyptologist.

She worked in the Theban Necropolis, near Luxor, recording and publishing tomb plans in the Valley of the Kings and Valley of the Queens.

== Early life and career ==
Thomas was born in Memphis, Tennessee, in 1907 to John Albert T. Thomas and Ruth Archer Thomas. She and her two older brothers, James and Wilmer, grew up in Granada, Mississippi. Thomas began studying at Granada College in 1924, transferring to Hollins College the next year. She took a break from studying for close to ten years, only to resume her studies at Granada College. She later transferred again and attended the University of Mississippi, where she received a B.A. in 1937. She first traveled to Egypt in 1935, spending a vast majority of time at the tombs in the Valleys of the Kings and Queens. Upon returning from the trip, Thomas began to study Egyptology at the Oriental Institute at the University of Chicago in 1938. Here she studied a variety of subjects, including the Hebrew language, as well as ancient Egyptian language and culture.

Her studies as a graduate student were derailed by World War II; between 1942 and 1946 she served in the Army Signal Corps, working as a cryptographer. She resumed graduate work in 1948, and formulated a thesis on the cosmology of the Pyramid Texts. Thomas received her M.A. that year. She returned to Egypt for several field seasons between 1948 and 1960, concentrating on royal tombs.

== First visit to Egypt ==
Thomas made her first visit to Egypt within a year of her graduation with Thomas Cook & Sons, a tourism company, to ensure safety. However, when she found out that the tour didn't always include the sites she wanted to explore or allow enough time to study its monuments in details, she hired transportation and guides as her only companions to venture off and study in the desert. From February to early March 1938, she traveled around Luxor where she spent most of her time to visit and study the tombs in the Valleys of the Kings and Queens. Thomas met Egyptologist Charles F. Nims and his wife Myrtle Nims, while visiting the Chicago House, the Luxor field headquarters of the Epigraphic Survey of the University of Chicago.

== Research ==
=== Queen Hatshepsut ===
Thomas worked on the KV60 tomb of Queen Hatshepsut’s wet nurse, which was discovered in 1903. Thomas argued that one of the mummies was Queen Hatshepsut, even though the tomb belonged to her wet nurse, because the left arm of the mummy was positioned over the chest. The positioning of the arm signified royalty, although Thomas was unable to prove her claim about the identification of Hatshepsut. Thomas wrote in her book, The royal necropoleis of Thebes [sic], that "Of the...mummy nothing can be said without examination. It is merely possible to ask a question with utmost temerity: did Thutmosis III [stepson and successor of Hatshep-sut] inter Hatshepsut intrusively in this simple tomb below her own?"

The tomb was lost and rediscovered in the 1980's. In 2007, Dr. Zahi Hawass, Egypt’s Secretary-General for the Supreme Council of Antiquities, announced that the mummy was indeed Hatshepsut, verified though DNA testing.

=== Other ===
Before much was known about KV5, Elizabeth Thomas suspected that the tomb may have belonged to the royal children of Ramses II. Her hunch was mentioned in a report about tomb robberies by government inspectors that occurred centuries after the construction of KV5. Although later generations of tomb robbers left the tomb in ruins, enough remained to prove that Thomas had been correct.

== Publications ==
- Thomas, Elizabeth (1966). The royal necropoleis of Thebes. Princeton.
- Thomas, Elizabeth (1978). "The 'Well' in Kings' Tombs of Bibân el-Molûk". The Journal of Egyptian Archaeology. 64: 80–83. doi:10.2307/3856437. JSTOR 3856437.
