= Hatshepsut =

Pharaoh of Egypt from 1479 to 1458 BC

- Statue of Hatshepsut on display at the Metropolitan Museum of Art

Pharaoh
- Reign: 22 regnal years: 1479–1457 BC (Low Chronology) (Note: Dates include her time as regent. Hatshepsut was crowned Pharaoh between Year 2 and 7 of her regency/Thutmose III's nominal sole reign, and contemporary dating protocols were retroactively including her rule as regent into the time she reigned as co-monarch of her stepson.) (Note: Thutmose's reign began in I Shemu (Month IX), day 4. Beckerath converted this date as 28 April 1479 BC, claiming it was a "chronological certainty" (chronologisch sicheren). He dates her death to January 1457 BC, accepting Manetho's claim that "Amessis" (Hatshepsut) ruled 21 years and 9 months. Her reign is now believed to have ended in Year 22, II Peret (Month VI), day 10, which would mean that she ruled for exactly 21 years and 281 days according to the Egyptian calendar (9 months + 6 days + 5 intercalary days). However, some authors have dated her death to 16 January 1458 BC. Adding 21 years, 281 days, to 28 April 1479 BC gives 3 February 1457 BC.)
- Coregency: Thutmose III
- Predecessor: Thutmose III (as sole ruler)
- Successor: Thutmose III (as sole ruler)
Royal titulary
Horus name
Weseret kau
wsrt-kꜢw
Powerful of kas
G5	wsr s X1 D28 D28 D28
Nebty name
Wadjet renput
wꜢḏt-rnpwt
Flourishing of years
G16	M13 X1 M4 M4 M4
Golden Horus
Netjeret khau
nṯrt-ḫꜤw
Divine of appearances
G8	nTr t xa Z2
Prenomen
Maat ka re
mꜢꜤt kꜢ rꜤ
The true one of the ka of Re
Truth (Ma'at) is the Ka of Re

M23 X1 L2 X1	ra mAat kA
Nomen
Khenemet imun, hat shepsut
imn ẖnmt ḥꜢt špswt
United with Amun, foremost of noble women

G39 N5	i mn n W9 t F4 t A51
- Consort: Thutmose II
- Children: Neferure
- Father: Thutmose I
- Mother: Ahmose
- Born: Between 1505-1495 BC
- Died: 1457 BC (aged 37-48)
- Burial: KV20 (possibly re-interred in KV60)
- Monuments: Temple of Karnak; Mortuary Temple of Hatshepsut; Speos Artemidos; Chapelle Rouge
- Dynasty: 18th Dynasty

Hatshepsut (Note: /hætˈʃɛpsʊt/; also Hatchepsout; Egyptian: ḥꜣt-špswt "Foremost of Noble Ladies"; or archaically Hatasu) (/hɑːtˈʃɛpsʊt/ haht-SHEPP-sut; c. 1505–1458 BC) was the sixth pharaoh of the Eighteenth Dynasty of Egypt, ruling first as regent, then as queen regnant from c. 1479 BC until c. 1458 BC (Low Chronology) and the Great Royal Wife of Pharaoh Thutmose II. She was Egypt's second confirmed woman who ruled in her own right, the first being Sobekneferu/Neferusobek in the Twelfth Dynasty.

Hatshepsut was the daughter of Thutmose I and Great Royal Wife, Ahmose. Upon the death of her husband and half-brother Thutmose II, she had initially ruled as regent to her stepson, Thutmose III, who inherited the throne at the age of two. Several years into her regency, Hatshepsut assumed the position of pharaoh and adopted the full royal titulary, making her a co-ruler alongside Thutmose III. In order to establish herself in the Egyptian patriarchy, she took on traditionally male roles and was depicted as a male pharaoh, with physically masculine traits and traditionally male garb. She emphasized both the qualities of men and women to convey the idea that she was both a mother and father to the realm. Hatshepsut's reign was a period of great prosperity and general peace. One of the most prolific builders in Ancient Egypt, she oversaw large-scale construction projects such as the Karnak Temple Complex, the Red Chapel, the Speos Artemidos and most famously, the Mortuary Temple of Hatshepsut at Deir el-Bahari.

Hatshepsut presumably died in Year 22 of the reign of Thutmose III. Towards the end of the reign of Thutmose III and into the reign of his son Amenhotep II, an attempt was made to remove her from official accounts of Egyptian historiography: her statues were destroyed, her monuments were defaced, and many of her achievements were ascribed to other pharaohs.

== Early life ==
Hatshepsut was born between 1505 and 1495 BC as eldest daughter of Thutmose I and his great royal wife, Ahmose. After her father's death, Hatshepsut was then married to Thutmose II, her half-brother and father's heir, when she was fourteen or fifteen years old. Thutmose II was of a similar age. The couple had together at least one daughter, Princess Neferure, who bore later the title of "King's Eldest Daughter", which implies that her parents might have had eventually a second daughter, who probably died in childhood.

== Reign ==
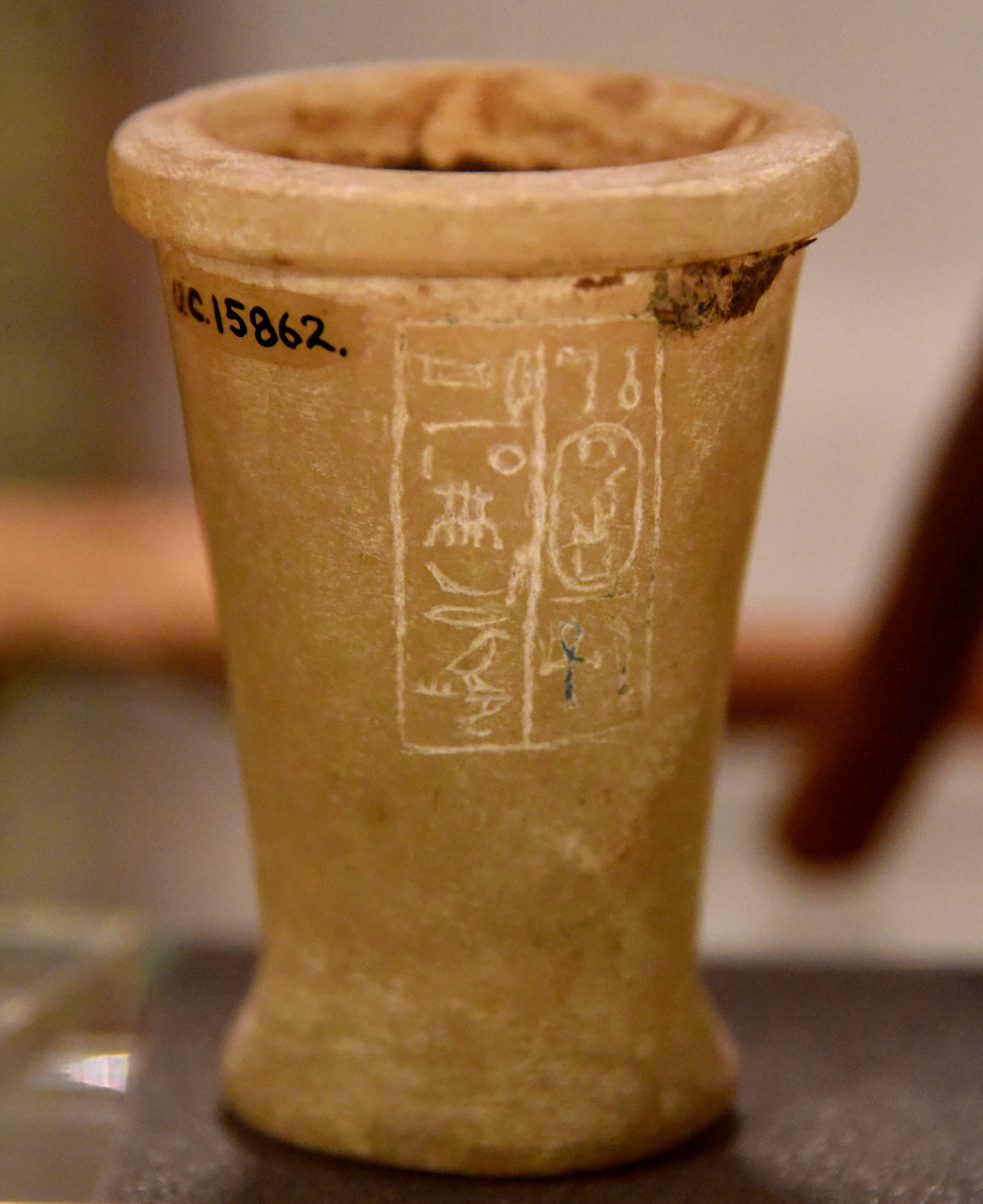
Jar bearing the cartouche of Hatshepsut. Filled in with cedar resin. Calcite, unfinished. Foundation deposit. 18th Dynasty, from Deir el-Bahari, Egypt. Petrie Museum, London

Upon the death of Thutmose II, the underage Thutmose III became the pharaoh of Egypt. Hatshepsut was thought of by early modern scholars to have only served as regent alongside him. However, modern scholars agree that, while she initially served as regent for young Thutmose III from his accession in c. 1479 BC, Hatshepsut eventually assumed the position of pharaoh alongside him by Year 7 of his reign, c. 1472 BC; becoming queen regnant, Hatshepsut shared Thutmose III's existing regnal count, effectively back-dating her accession as pharaoh to Year 1, when she had been merely regent. As a result, Thutmose III was relegated to junior coregent (Horus), while Hatshepsut became senior coregent (Osiris). Although queen Sobekneferu and (possibly) Nitocris, have previously assumed the role of pharaoh, Hatshepsut was the only female ruler to do so in a time of prosperity, and she arguably had more powers than her female predecessors.

Retrospectively, Hatshepsut was described by ancient authors as having reigned for about 21–22 years, which included both her regency and her reign as queen regnant. Josephus and Julius Africanus follow the earlier testimony of Manetho (3rd century BC), mentioning a queen regnant called Amessis (Aμεσσης) or Amensis, specified by Josephus as having been the sister of her predecessor. This woman was later identified by historians as Hatshepsut. In Josephus's text, her reign is described as lasting for 21 years and 9 months, while Africanus states it as 22 years, apparently rounding up. The latest attestation of Hatshepsut in contemporary records comes from Year 20 of the regnal count of Thutmose III; she is no longer mentioned in Year 22, when he undertook his first major foreign campaign. This is compatible with the 21 years 9 months recorded by Manetho and Josephus, which would place the end of Hatshepsut's reign in Year 22 of Thutmose III.

Dating the beginning of her reign is more difficult. Her father, Thutmose I, began his reign in either 1526 BC or 1506 BC according to the high and low estimates of her reign, although the length of the reigns of Thutmose I and Thutmose II cannot be determined with certainty. With short reigns, Hatshepsut would have ascended the throne 14 years after her father's coronation; longer reigns would put her accession 25 years after his coronation.

The earliest attestation of Hatshepsut as pharaoh occurs in the tomb of Ramose and Hatnofer, where a collection of grave goods contained a single pottery jar or amphora from the tomb's chamber, stamped with the date "Year 7". Another jar from the same tomb, discovered in situ by a 1935–36 Metropolitan Museum of Art expedition on a hillside near Thebes, was stamped with the seal of the "God's Wife Hatshepsut", and two jars bore the seal of "The Good Goddess Maatkare". The dating of the amphorae, "sealed into the [tomb's] burial chamber by the debris from Senenmut's own tomb", is undisputed, meaning that Hatshepsut was acknowledged as pharaoh of Egypt—and no longer merely regent—by Year 7 of her reign. She was certainly pharaoh by Year 9, the date of the Punt expedition, c. 1471 BC; her last dated attestation as pharaoh is Year 20, c. 1460 BC, and she no longer appears in Year 22, c. 1458.

== Major accomplishments ==
=== Trade routes ===
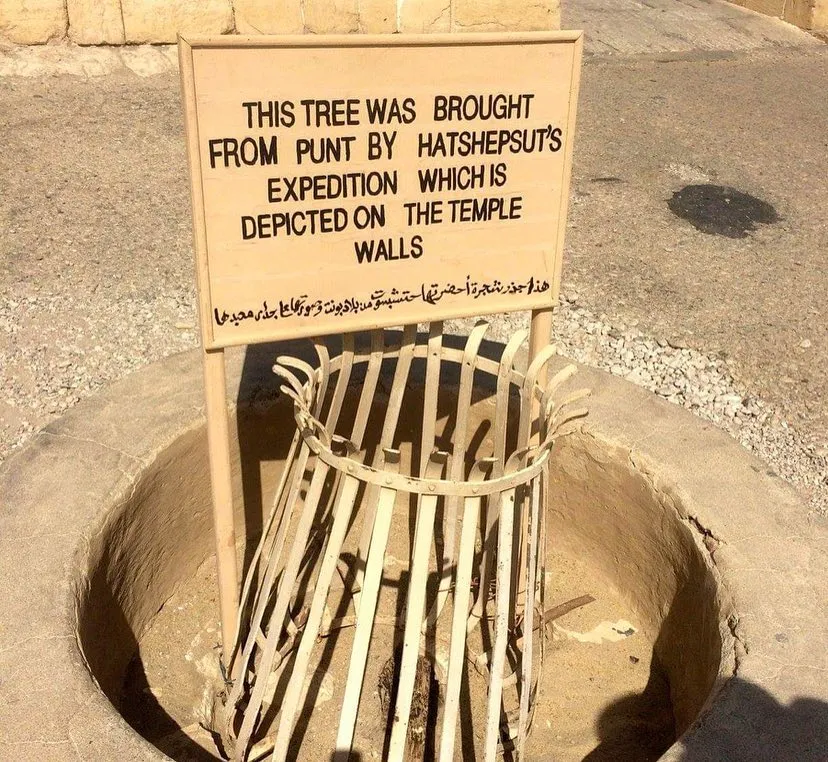
The trunk of a myrrh tree brought by Hatshepsut's expedition from the Land of Punt, planted in front of her temple at Deir el-Bahari.

Hatshepsut re-established a number of trade networks that had been disrupted during the Hyksos occupation of Egypt during the Second Intermediate Period. She oversaw the preparations and funding for a mission to the Land of Punt.

Hatshepsut's delegation returned from Punt bearing 31 live myrrh trees and other luxuries such as frankincense. Hatshepsut would grind the charred frankincense into kohl eyeliner. This is the first recorded use of the resin.

Hatshepsut had the expedition commemorated in relief at Deir el-Bahari, which is also famous for its realistic depiction of Queen Ati of the Land of Punt. Hatshepsut also sent raiding expeditions to Byblos and the Sinai Peninsula shortly after the Punt expedition. Very little is known about these expeditions. Although many Egyptologists have claimed that her foreign policy was mainly peaceful, it is possible that she led military campaigns against Nubia and Canaan.

=== Building projects ===
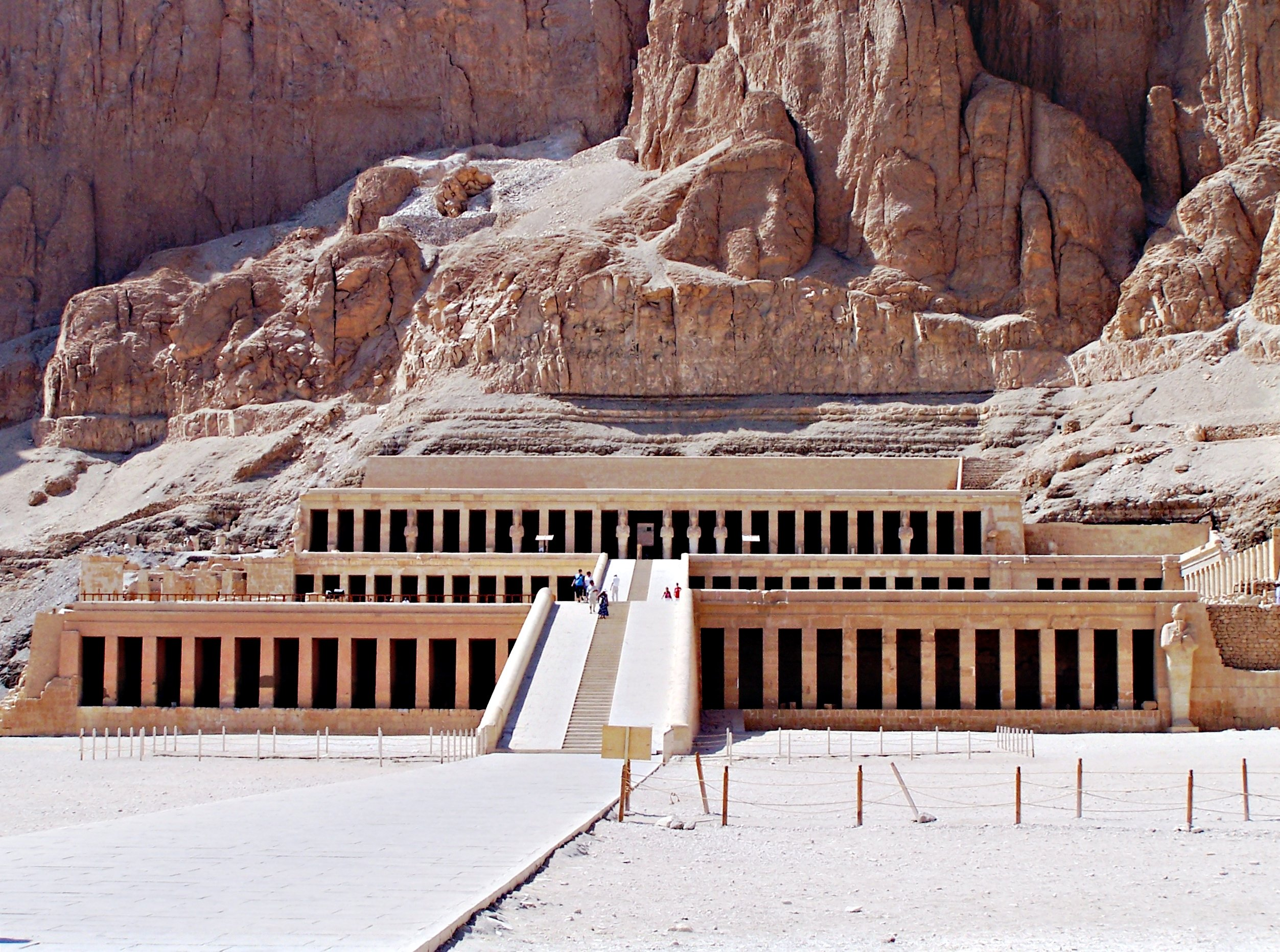
The Colonnaded design of Hatshepsut's mortuary temple

Hatshepsut was one of the most prolific builders in Ancient Egypt, commissioning hundreds of construction projects throughout both Upper Egypt and Lower Egypt. Many of these building projects were temples to build her religious base and legitimacy beyond her position as God's Wife of Amun. At these temples, she performed religious rituals that had hitherto been reserved for kings, corroborating the evidence that Hatshepsut assumed traditionally male roles as pharaoh. She employed the great architect Ineni, who also had worked for her father, her husband, and for the royal steward Senenmut. The extant artifacts of the statuary provide archaeological evidence of Hatshepsut's portrayals of herself as a male pharaoh, with physically masculine traits and traditionally male Ancient Egyptian garb, such as a false beard and ram's horns. These images are seen as symbolic, and not evidence of cross-dressing or androgyny.

Following the tradition of most pharaohs, Hatshepsut had monuments constructed at the Temple of Karnak. She also restored the original Precinct of Mut, the great ancient goddess of Egypt, at Karnak that had been ravaged by the foreign rulers during the Hyksos occupation. It later was ravaged by other pharaohs, who took one part after another to use in their own projects. The precinct awaits restoration. She had twin obelisks erected at the entrance to the temple which at the time of building were the tallest in the world. Only one remains upright, which is the second-tallest ancient obelisk still standing, the other having toppled and broken in two. The official in charge of those obelisks was the high steward Amenhotep. Another project, Karnak's Red Chapel, or Chapelle Rouge, was built as a barque shrine.

Later, she ordered the construction of two more obelisks to celebrate her 16th year as pharaoh; one of the obelisks broke during construction, and a third was therefore constructed to replace it. The broken obelisk was left at its quarrying site in Aswan, where it remains. Known as the Unfinished Obelisk, it provides evidence of how obelisks were quarried.

Hatshepsut built the Temple of Pakhet at Beni Hasan in the Minya Governorate south of Al Minya. The name, Pakhet, was a synthesis that occurred by combining Bast and Sekhmet, who were similar lioness war goddesses, in an area that bordered the north and south division of their cults. The cavernous underground temple, cut into the rock cliffs on the eastern side of the Nile, was admired and called the Speos Artemidos by the Greeks during their occupation of Egypt, known as the Ptolemaic Dynasty. They saw the goddess as akin to their hunter goddess, Artemis. The temple is thought to have been built alongside much more ancient ones that have not survived. This temple has an architrave with a long dedicatory text bearing Hatshepsut's famous denunciation of the Hyksos that James P. Allen has translated. This temple was altered later, and some of its insides were altered by Seti I of the Nineteenth Dynasty in an attempt to have his name replace that of Hatshepsut.

Following the tradition of many pharaohs, the masterpiece of Hatshepsut's building projects was a mortuary temple. She built hers in a complex at Deir el-Bahari. The identity of the architect behind the project remains unclear. It is possible that Senenmut, the Overseer of Works, or Hapuseneb, the High Priest, was responsible. It is also likely that Hatshepsut provided input to the project. Located opposite the city of Luxor, it is considered to be a masterpiece of ancient architecture. The complex's focal point was the Djeser-Djeseru or "the Holy of Holies".

=== Official lauding ===
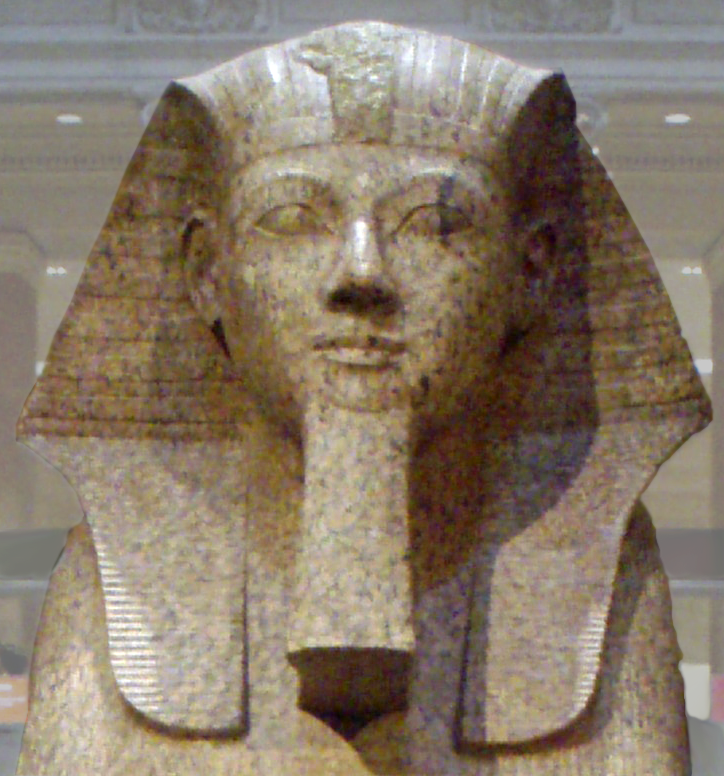
Hatshepsut was "often portrayed in lion form sphinx when she ruled as king", as in this granite sculpture which also shows her wearing the traditional false beard, a symbol of pharaonic power.

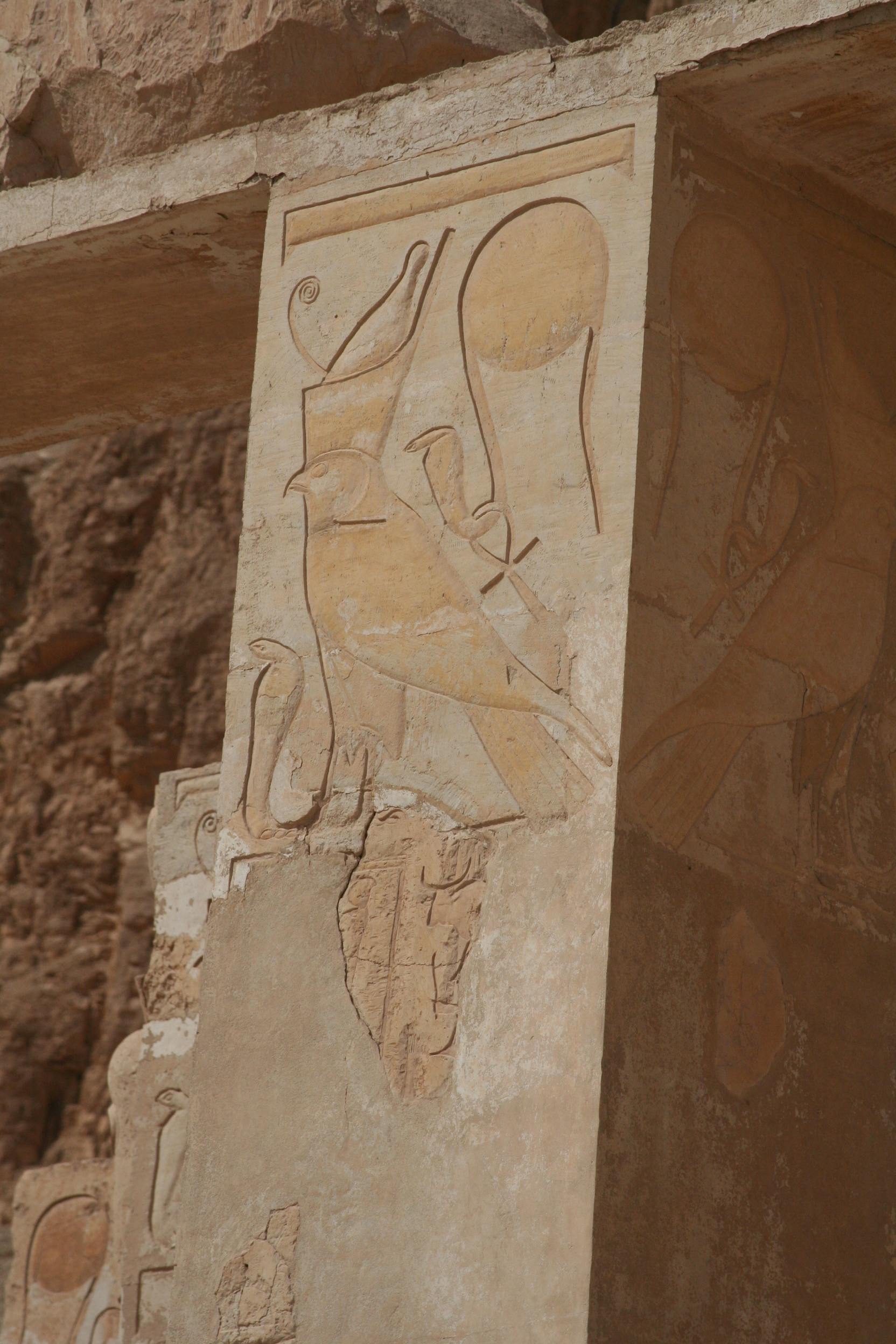
The Hawk of the Pharaoh, Hatshepsut—Temple at Luxor

Hyperbole is common to virtually all royal inscriptions of Egyptian history. While all ancient leaders used it to laud their achievements, Hatshepsut has been called the most accomplished pharaoh at promoting her accomplishments.

Hatshepsut assumed all the regalia and symbols of the Pharaonic office in official representations: the Khat head cloth, topped with the uraeus, the traditional false beard, and shendyt kilt. Hatshepsut was ambiguous and androgynous in many of her statues and monuments. She would create a masculine version of herself to establish herself in the Egyptian patriarchy.

Osirian statues of Hatshepsut—as with other pharaohs—depict the dead pharaoh as Osiris, with the body and regalia of that deity.

To further lay her claim to the throne, priests told a story of divine birth. In this myth, Amun goes to Ahmose in the form of Thutmose I. Hatshepsut is conceived by Ahmose. Khnum, the god who forms the bodies of human children, is then instructed to create a body and ka, or corporal presence/life force, for Hatshepsut. Heket, the goddess of life and fertility, and Khnum then lead Ahmose along to a place where she gives birth to Hatshepsut. Reliefs depicting each step in these events are at Karnak and in her mortuary temple.

The Oracle of Amun proclaimed that it was the will of Amun that Hatshepsut be pharaoh, further strengthening her position. She reiterated Amun's support by having these proclamations by the god Amun carved on her monuments:

Welcome my sweet daughter, my favorite, the King of Upper and Lower Egypt, Maatkare, Hatshepsut. Thou art the Pharaoh, taking possession of the Two Lands.

Once she became pharaoh herself, Hatshepsut supported her assertion that she was her father's designated successor with inscriptions on the walls of her mortuary temple:

Then his majesty said to them: "This daughter of mine, Khnumetamun Hatshepsut—may she live!—I have appointed as my successor upon my throne... she shall direct the people in every sphere of the palace; it is she indeed who shall lead you. Obey her words, unite yourselves at her command." The royal nobles, the dignitaries, and the leaders of the people heard this proclamation of the promotion of his daughter, the King of Upper and Lower Egypt, Maatkare—may she live eternally.

== Irregular Heb Sed ==
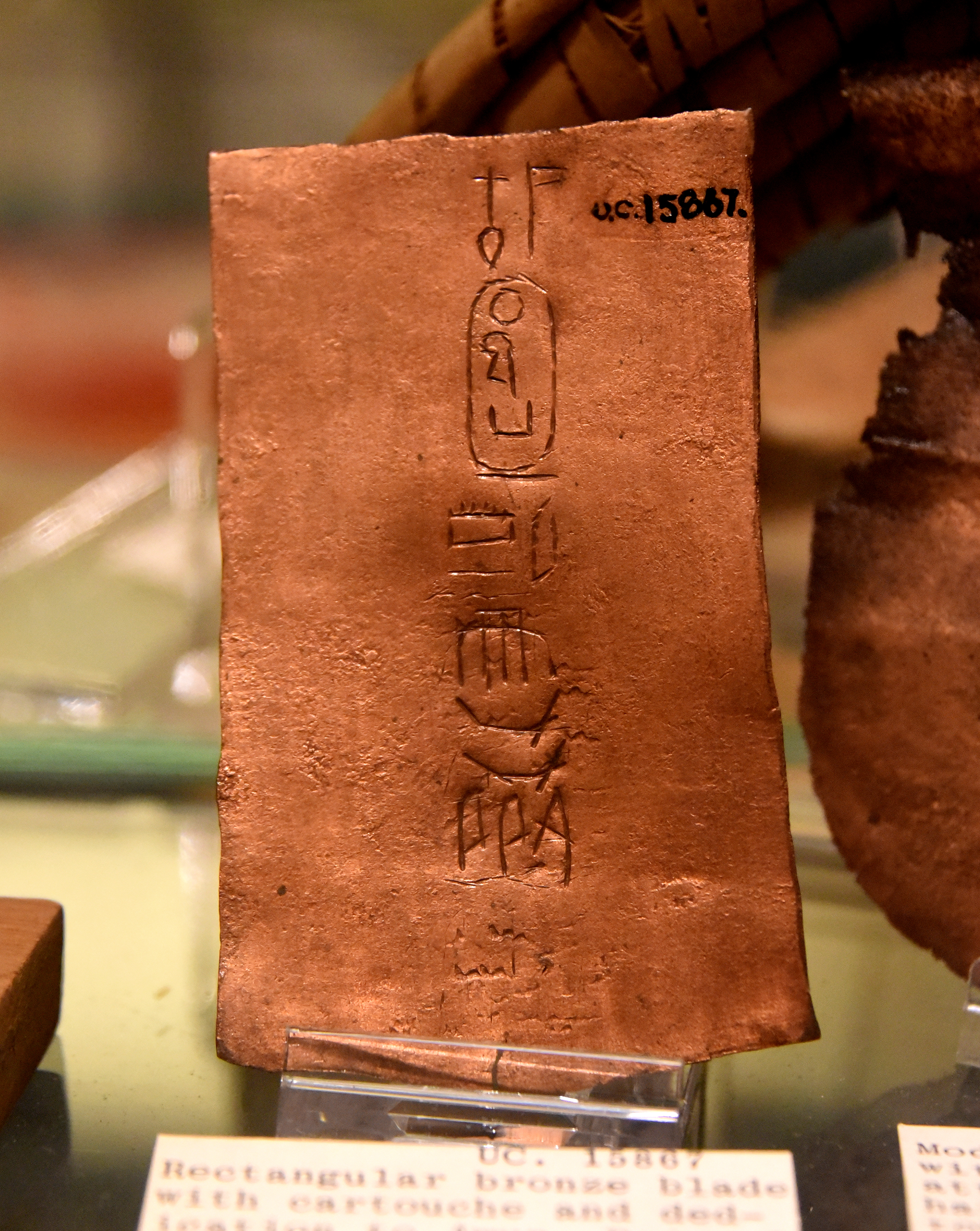
Copper or bronze sheet bearing the name of Hatshepsut. From a foundation deposit in a small pit covered with a mat found at Deir el-Bahari.

Like the future 18th dynasty king Akhenaten who celebrated a heb sed jubilee after only 4 years on the throne, Hatshepsut announced her first heb sed jubilee in the 15th year of her rule as pharaoh unlike the traditional 30th year for other Egyptian kings. In theory, an Egyptian ruler:

"was entitled to celebrate his first jubilee thirty years after his coronation and thereafter as frequently as he desired....Hatchepsut, atypical as always, announced her jubilee during regnal Year 15. This was by no means the first royal tradition to be broken by Hatchepsut..."

Some Egyptologists, such as Jürgen von Beckerath in his book Chronology of the Egyptian Pharaohs, speculate that Hatshepsut may have celebrated her first Sed jubilee rather to mark the passing of 30 years from the death of her father, Thutmose I, from whom she derived all of her legitimacy to rule Egypt. If true, this would imply that her late husband, Thutmose II, had a reign of 13-14 years. On other hand, Kara Cooney suggests Hatshepsut was commemorating 30 years of her father's dynasty (11 years for Thutmose I, 3 years for Thutmose II and 16 for Thutmose III) which would suggest short reign for her husband. Alternatively, Cooney proposed that Hatshepsut might have celebrated 30 years of her own life.

== Death, burial, and mummification ==
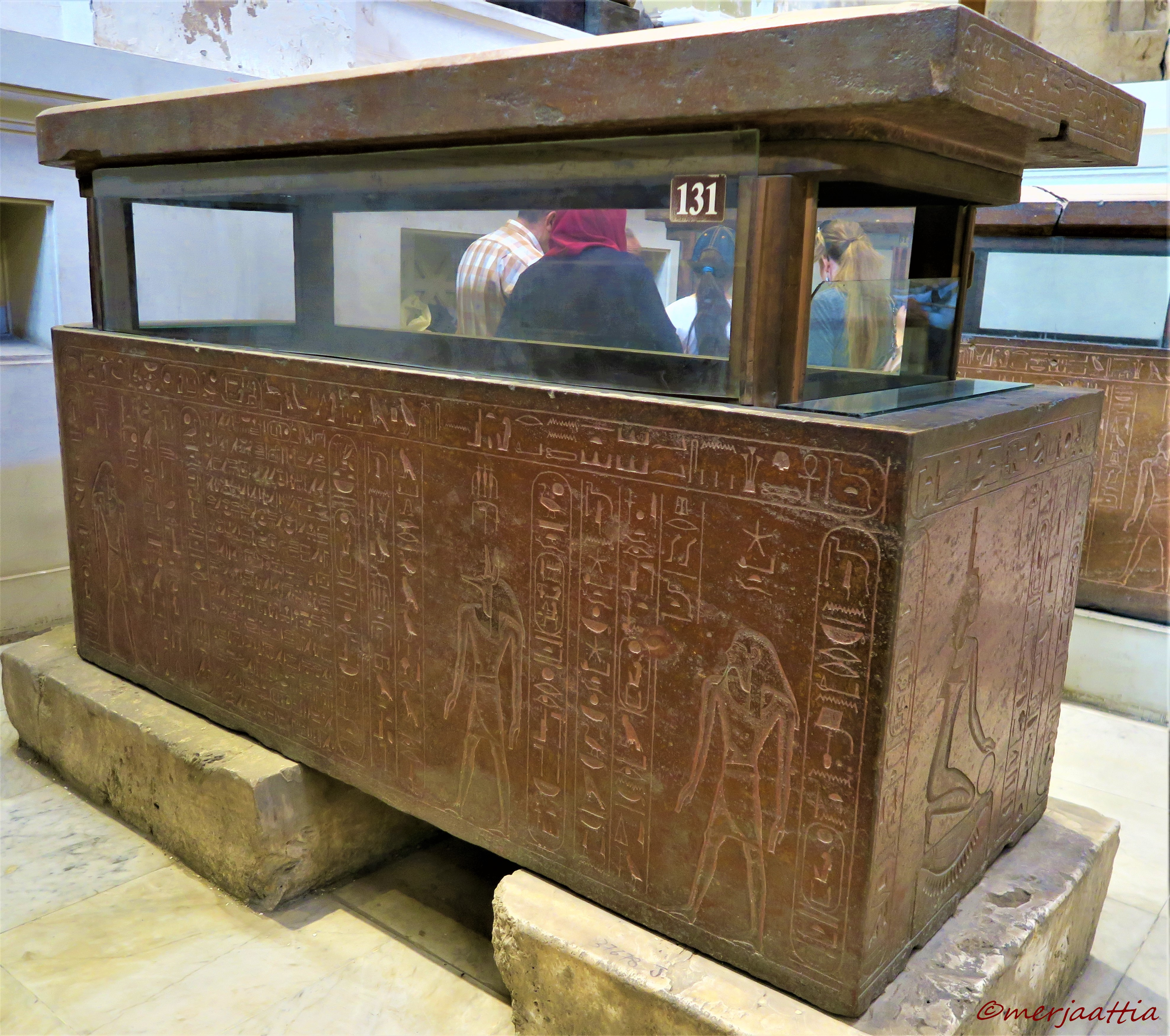
Hatshepsut's quartz sarcophagus Egyptian Museum.

Hatshepsut's last dated attestation as pharaoh is Year 20, III Peret, Day 2, c. 22 May 1459 BC, but the reign length of 21 years and 9 months for her by Manetho in Josephus's book Contra Apionem indicates that she ceased to reign in Year 22, c. 1458 BC. The precise date of the beginning of Thutmose III's reign as sole ruler of Egypt—and presumably of Hatshepsut's death—is considered to be Year 22, II Peret (Month IX), Day 10, recorded on a single stela erected at Armant, (Note: Scholars consider the Armant stela to mark the occasion of Thutmose III's sole reign since he uses the epithet "Thutmose, Ruler of Maat" twice on this document for the first time in his reign. This means he was asserting his own claim to the administration of Egypt after that of Hatshepsut, who by then had probably died.) possibly corresponding to 16 January 1458 BC or 16 January 1457 BC. This information validates the basic reliability of Manetho's king list records since Hatshepsut's known accession date was I Shemu (Month VI), Day 4.

Hatshepsut began constructing a tomb when she was the Great Royal Wife of Thutmose II. Still, the scale of this was not suitable for a pharaoh, so when she ascended the throne, preparation for another burial started. For this, KV20, originally quarried for her father, Thutmose I, and probably the first royal tomb in the Valley of the Kings, was extended with a new burial chamber. Hatshepsut also refurbished her father's burial and prepared for a double interment of both Thutmose I and her within KV20. Therefore, it is likely that when she died (no later than the 22nd year of her reign), she was interred in this tomb along with her father.

However, during Thutmose III's reign, a new tomb (KV38), was constructed along with fresh burial equipment for Thutmose I. Thus, Thutmose I was relocated from his original tomb and reburied elsewhere. There is a possibility that at the same time, Hatshepsut's mummy was moved into the tomb of her nurse, Sitre In, in KV60. These actions could have been motivated by Amenhotep II, Thutmose III's son from a secondary wife, in an effort to secure his own uncertain claim to the throne.

Besides what was recovered from KV20 during Egyptologist Howard Carter's clearance of the tomb in 1903, other funerary furniture belonging to Hatshepsut has been found elsewhere, including a lioness throne or bedstead, a senet game board with carved lioness-headed, red-jasper game pieces bearing her pharaonic title, a signet ring, and a partial shabti figurine bearing her name. In the Royal Mummy Cache at DB320, a wooden canopic box featuring an ivory knob was found, bearing the name of Hatshepsut and containing a mummified liver or spleen, along with a molar tooth. There was also a royal lady with the same name from the 21st dynasty, leading to initial speculation that the artifacts may have belonged to her instead.

=== Proposed mummy ===
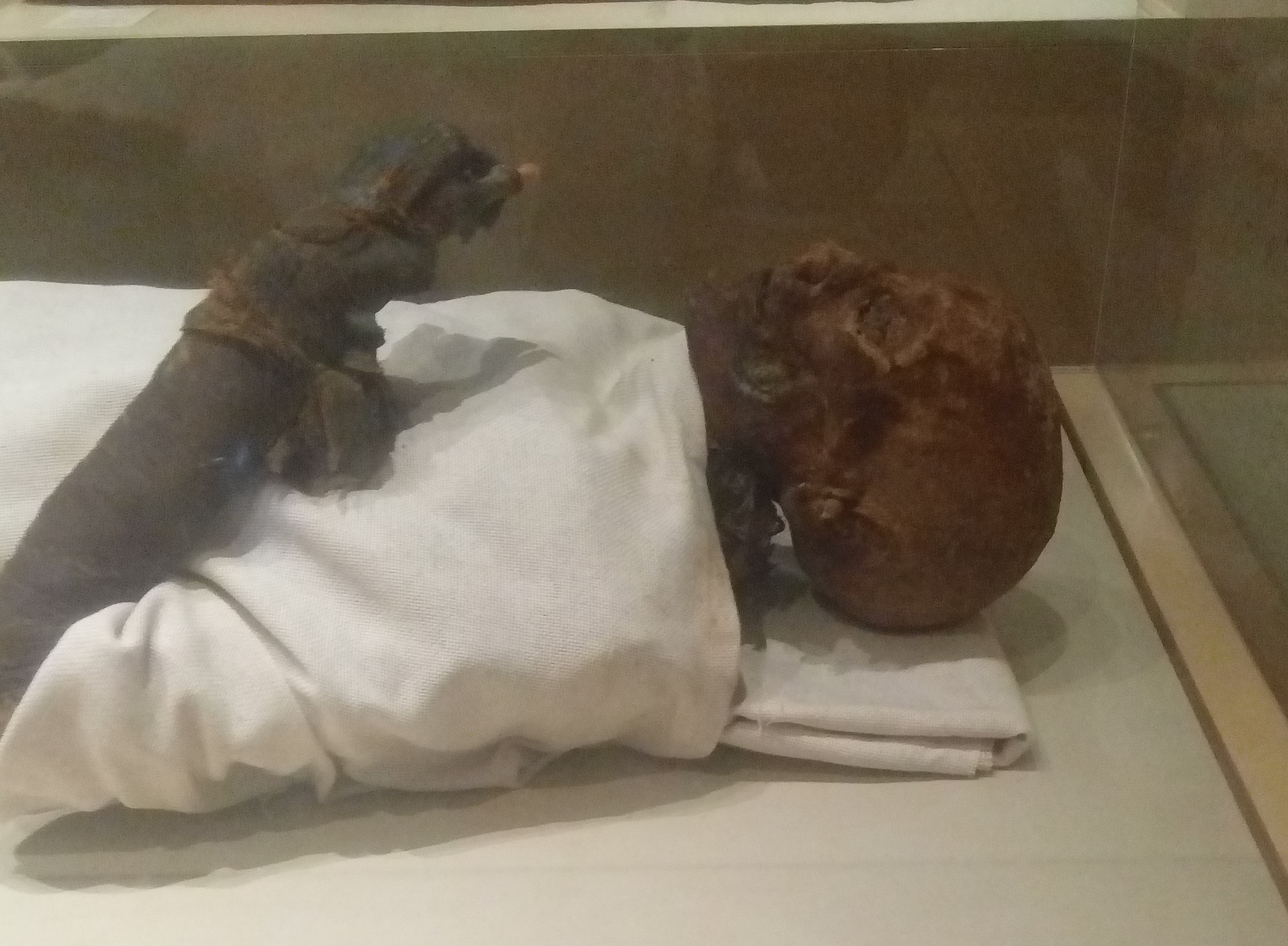
The KV60A mummy, thought to be that of Hatshepsut

In 1903, Howard Carter had discovered tomb KV60 in the Valley of the Kings. It contained two female mummies: one identified as Hatshepsut's wet nurse and the other unidentified. In spring 2007, the unidentified body, called KV60A, was finally removed from the tomb by Dr. Zahi Hawass and taken to Cairo's Egyptian Museum for testing. This mummy was missing a tooth, and the space in the jaw perfectly matched Hatshepsut's existing molar, found in the DB320 "canopic box". Based on this, Hawass concluded that the KV60A mummy is very likely Hatshepsut.

While the mummy and the tooth could be DNA tested to see if it belonged to the same person and confirm the mummy's identity, Hawass, the Cairo Museum and some Egyptologists have refused to do it as it would require destroying the tooth to retrieve the DNA. Her death has since been attributed to a benzopyrene carcinogenic skin lotion found in possession of the Pharaoh, which led to her having bone cancer: a tumor destroyed part of her left hip, and spread to her lumbar vertebrae. Other members of the queen's family are thought to have suffered from inflammatory skin diseases that tend to be genetic. Assuming that the mummy is that of Hatshepsut, it is likely that she inadvertently poisoned herself while trying to soothe her itchy, irritated skin. It also would suggest that she had arthritis and bad teeth, which may be why the tooth was removed.

However, in 2011, the tooth was identified as the molar from a lower jaw, whereas the mummy from KV60 was missing a molar from its upper jaw, thus casting doubt on the supposed identification.

== Damnatio memoriae ==
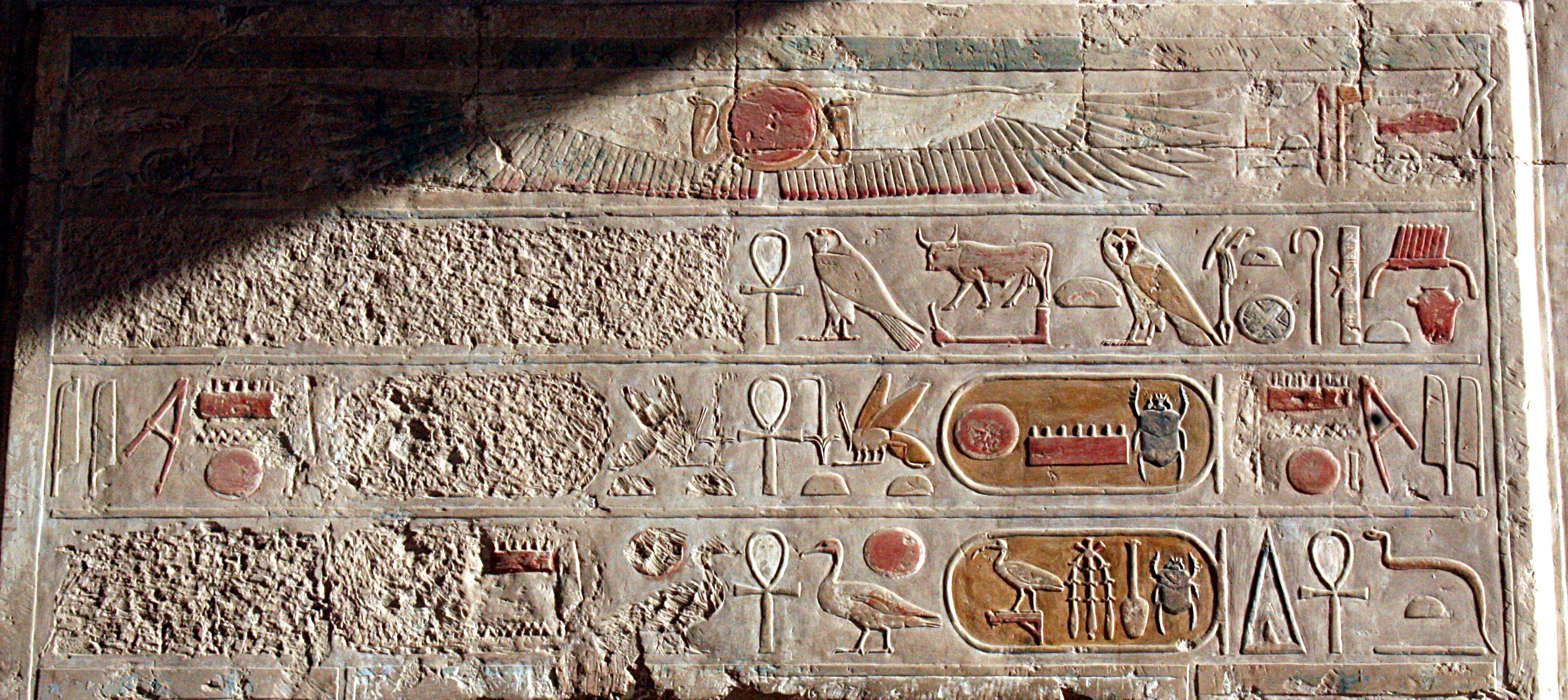
An example of damnatio memoriae of Hatshepsut in Deir el-Bahari. While the cartouches of Thutmose III (right) were left intact, the cartouches of Hatshepsut (left) were hacked off, presumably by Amenhotep II.

Toward the end of the reign of Thutmose III and into the reign of his son, an attempt was made to remove Hatshepsut from certain historical and pharaonic records. Her cartouches and images were chiselled off stone walls. Erasure methods ranged from full destruction of any instance of her name or image to replacement, inserting Thutmose I or II where Hatshepsut once stood. There were also instances of smoothing, patchwork jobs that covered Hatshepsut's cartouche; examples of this can be seen on the walls of the Deir el-Bahari temple. Simpler methods also included covering, where new stone was added to fully cover reliefs or sacred stone work.

At the Deir el-Bahari temple, Hatshepsut's many statues were torn down and in many cases, smashed or disfigured before being buried in a pit. At Karnak, an attempt was made to wall up her monuments. While it is clear that much of this rewriting of Hatshepsut's history occurred only during the close of Thutmose III's reign, it is not clear why it happened, other than as a manifestation of the typical pattern of self-promotion that existed among the pharaohs and their administrators, or perhaps to save money by not building new monuments for the burial of Thutmose III, and instead using the grand structures built by Hatshepsut.

Amenhotep II, the son of Thutmose III, who became a co-regent toward the end of his father's reign, is suspected by some as being the defacer during the end of the reign of a very old pharaoh. He would have had a motive because his position in the royal lineage was not so strong as to assure his elevation to pharaoh. He is documented, further, as having usurped many of Hatshepsut's accomplishments during his own reign. His reign is marked with attempts to break the royal lineage as well, not recording the names of his queens and eliminating the powerful titles and official roles of royal women, such as God's Wife of Amun. Some of these titles would be restored in the reign of his son Thutmose IV.

For many years, presuming that it was Thutmose III acting out of resentment once he became pharaoh, early modern Egyptologists presumed that the erasures were similar to the Roman damnatio memoriae. Egyptologist Donald Redford says that this was not borne out of hatred but was a political necessity to assert his own beliefs. Redford added:

But did Thutmose remember her? Here and there, in the dark recesses of a shrine or tomb where no plebeian eye could see, the queen's cartouche and figure were left intact ... which never vulgar eye would again behold, still conveyed for the king the warmth and awe of a divine presence.

It has long been assumed statuary of Hatshepsut was abased by Thutmose III in an act of iconoclasm but later research has suggested that it was a simple case of routine ritual deactivation of the statuary.

== Modern assessment ==
Hatshepsut is, according to Egyptologist James Henry Breasted, "the first great woman in history of whom we are informed." In some ways, Hatshepsut's reign was seen as going against the patriarchal system of her time. She managed to rule as regent for a son who was not her own, going against the system which had previously only allowed mothers to rule on behalf of their biological sons. She used this regency to create her female kingship, constructing extensive temples to celebrate her reign, which meant that the public became used to seeing a woman in such a powerful role. This ensured that when the oracle declared her king, the Egyptian public readily accepted her status.

However, as with other female heads of state in ancient Egypt, this was only done through the use of male symbols of kingship; hence the description of Hatshepsut and others as female kings rather than queens.

Egyptologist Kara Cooney states that Hatshepsut was essentially given power by the elite class, who nominally served her, to further their own interests. She was raised to power due to her previous, successful record as a High Priestess (and during the succession crisis leading up to her regency), and during her rule, the elites gained significant power and wealth.

Historian Joyce Tyldesley stated that Thutmose III may have ordered public monuments to Hatshepsut and her achievements to be altered or destroyed in order to place her in a lower position of co-regent, meaning he could claim that royal succession ran directly from Thutmose II to Thutmose III without any interference from his aunt. This was supported by Thutmose III's officials, and as Hatshepsut's officials either died or were no longer in the public eye, there was little opposition to this. (Note: Tyldesley (1996) notes on p. 252 that a detailed discussion of the disappearance of Senenmut – Hatshepsut's highest official and closest supporter who retired abruptly or died around Years 16 and 20 of Hatshepsut's reign – and a useful list of other publications on this topic is given in A. R. Schulman's 1969–70 paper "Some Remarks on the Alleged 'Fall' of Senmut," JARCE 8, pp. 29–48.) Tyldesley, along with historians Peter Dorman and Gay Robins, say that the erasure and defacement of Hatshepsut's monuments may have been an attempt to extinguish the memory of female kingship (including its successes, as opposed to the female pharaoh Sobekneferu, who failed to rejuvenate Egypt's fortunes and was therefore more acceptable to the conservative establishment as a tragic figure) and re-legitimise his right to rule.

The "Hatshepsut Problem" is a direct link to gender normatives in regards to ancient Egyptian social structures. Although she did hold Queen status, her reign, especially after, was disregarded and even erased. Her reign could be considered more successful than some pharaohs' reigns, for example with expanding borders, which can be seen as a threat to traditional gender roles. This raises questions about the conflict between power and traditional gender roles, and to what extent modernism and conservatism overlap.

Early depictions of Hatshepsut were traditionally female: yellow paint, full-body gown, stationary, a queen referred to with female pronouns. After she started ruling, these became mixed: gown, atef crown, beard; then orange paint, topless like a male Pharaoh but with female breasts. Later depictions were masculine: red paint, topless with muscles and broad shoulders, moving and engaged in physical activity, referred to with male and female pronouns as a female king. She was elevated to god status without marrying.

The erasure of Hatshepsut's name—by the men who succeeded her for whatever reason—almost caused her to disappear from Egypt's archaeological and written records. When 19th-century Egyptologists started to interpret the texts on the Deir el-Bahari temple walls (which were illustrated with two seemingly male kings) their translations made no sense. Jean-François Champollion, the French decoder of hieroglyphs, said:

If I felt somewhat surprised at seeing here, as elsewhere throughout the temple, the renowned Moeris [Thutmose III], adorned with all the insignia of royalty, giving place to this Amenenthe [Hatshepsut], for whose name we may search the royal lists in vain, still more astonished was I to find upon reading the inscriptions that wherever they referred to this bearded king in the usual dress of the Pharaohs, nouns and verbs were in the feminine, as though a queen were in question. I found the same peculiarity everywhere...

This problem was a major issue in late 19th-century and early 20th-century Egyptology, centering on confusion and disagreement on the order of succession of early 18th Dynasty pharaohs. The dilemma takes its name from confusion over the chronology of the rule of Queen Hatshepsut and Thutmose I, II, and III.

== See also ==
- Djehuty, overseer of the treasury under Hatshepsut's rule
- Eighteenth Dynasty of Egypt family tree

== Bibliography ==
- American Research Center in Egypt (2007). "Volumes 41–43". Journal of the American Research Center in Egypt. American Research Center in Egypt.
- Allen, James P. (2002). "The Speos Artemidos Inscription of Hatshepsut". Bulletin of the Egyptological Seminar 16. Archived from the original on 3 April 2007.
- Andronik, Catherine M.; Fiedler, Joseph Daniel (2001). Hatshepsut, His Majesty, Herself. New York: Atheneum. ISBN 978-0-689-82562-0.
- Baum, Margaux; Thomas, Susanna (15 December 2016). Hatshepsut. The Rosen Publishing Group, Inc. ISBN 978-1-5081-7251-2.
- Beckerath, Jürgen von (1997). Chronologie des pharaonischen Ägypten: die Zeitbestimmung der ägyptischen Geschichte von der Vorzeit bis 332 v. Chr (in German). Verlag Philipp von Zabern. ISBN 978-3-8053-2310-9.
- Bickerstaffe, Dylan (Spring 2002). "The Discovery of Hatshepsut's 'Throne'". Kmt.
- Bierbrier, M. L. (1995). "How old was Hatshepsut?". Göttinger Miszellen (144). Universität der Göttingen, Seminar für Agyptologie und Koptologie, Göttingen: 15–19. ISSN 0344-385X.
- University of Bonn (2011). "Deadly ancient Egyptian medication? German scientists shed light on dark secret of Queen Hatshepsut's flacon". ScienceDaily. Archived from the original on 9 July 2021.
- Breasted, James Henry (1906). Ockerbloom, John Mark (ed.). Ancient Records of Egypt: Historical Documents from the Earliest Times to the Persian Conquest. The University of Chicago Press – via The Online Books Page.
- Brown, Chip (April 2009). "The King Herself". National Geographic: 88–111. Archived from the original on 15 March 2021.
- Bunson, Margaret (2002). Encyclopedia of Ancient Egypt (Rev. ed.). Facts on File. ISBN 0-8160-4563-1.
- Champollion le Jeune (1868). "QUINZIÈME LETTRE: Thèbes, le 18 juin 1829". Lettres écrites d'Égypte et de Nubie en 1828 et 1829 (in French) (Nouvelle ed.) – via Project Gutenberg.
- Clayton, Peter (1994). Chronicle of the Pharaohs. Thames & Hudson. ISBN 9780500050743.
- Cooney, Kara (2015). The Woman Who Would be King. Oneworld Publications. ISBN 978-1-322-38466-5. OCLC 897502797.
- Cooney, Kara (2018). When Women Ruled the World: Six Queens of Egypt. Washington, D.C.: National Geographic. ISBN 978-1-4262-1977-1.
- Dell, Pamela (2008). Hatshepsut: Egypt's First Female Pharaoh. Capstone Publishers. ISBN 978-0-7565-3835-4.
- Dodson, Aidan; Hilton, Dyan (2004). The Complete Royal Families of Ancient Egypt. Thames & Hudson. ISBN 0-500-05128-3.
- Edwards, Amelia B. (1891). Pharaohs, Fellahs and Explorers. Harper & Brothers.
- Emberling, Geoff; Williams, Bruce (2020). The Oxford Handbook of Ancient Nubia. Oxford University Press. ISBN 978-0-19-049627-2.
- Fletcher, Joann (2013). The Search For Nefertiti. Hachette UK. ISBN 978-1-4447-8054-3. Archived from the original on 15 November 2020.
- Forbes, Dennis C. (Fall 2005). "Maatkare Hatshepsut: The Female Pharaoh". Kmt.
- Gabolde, Luc (1987). "La chronologie du règne de Thoutmosis II, ses conséquences sur la datation des momies royales et leurs répercussions sur l'histoire du développement de la Vallée des rois". Studien zur Altägyptischen Kultur (in French): 61–87.
- Gardiner, Sir Alan (1961). Egypt of the Pharaohs. Oxford: Clarendon Press.
- Graves-Brown, Carolyn (2010). Dancing for Hathor: Women in Ancient Egypt. London: Continuum. ISBN 978-1847250544.
- Graefe, Erhard (2011). "Der angebliche Zahn der angeblich krebskranken Diabetikerin Königin Hatschepsut, oder: Die Mumie der Hatschepsut bleibt unbekannt". Göttinger Miszellen (in German). 231. Göttingen: Universität der Göttingen, Seminar für Agyptologie und Koptologie. ISSN 0344-385X.
- Grimal, Nicolas (1988). A History of Ancient Egypt. Paris: Librairie Arthéme Fayard.
- Hinds, Kathryn (2007). The Pharaoh's Court. Marshall Cavendish. ISBN 978-0-7614-2183-2.
- Hornung, E.; Krauss, R.; Warburton, D. A., eds. (2006). Ancient Egyptian Chronology. Leiden: Brill. ISBN 9789047404002.
- Hornung, Erik. "New Kingdom". In Hornung, Krauss & Warburton (2006).
- Isaac, Michael (2004). A Historical Atlas of Oman. The Rosen Publishing Group. ISBN 978-0-8239-4500-9. Archived from the original on 14 September 2014.
- Lipinska, Jadwiga (2001). "Hatshepsut (r. 1502–1482 BCE)". Oxford Encyclopedia of Ancient Egypt – Volume 2. pp. 85–87.
- Martin, G. (2012). African Political Thought. Springer. ISBN 978-1-137-06205-5. Archived from the original on 4 February 2021.
- Morenz, Siegfried (1992). Egyptian Religion. Cornell University Press. ISBN 978-0-8014-8029-4.
- National Geographic (June 2007). "Photo Gallery: Mummy of Egypt's Lost Queen Found". National Geographic. Archived from the original on 27 May 2014.
- Njoku, Raphael Chijioke (2013). The History of Somalia. ABC-CLIO. pp. 29–31. ISBN 978-0-313-37857-7. Archived from the original on 25 January 2015.
- Pirelli, Rosanna (1999). "Deir el-Bahri, Hatshepsut temple". In Bard, Kathryn (ed.). Encyclopedia of the archaeology of ancient Egypt. London; New York: Routledge. pp. 275–280. ISBN 978-0-203-98283-9.
- Radner, Karen; Moeller, Nadine; Potts, D. T. (2022). The Oxford History of the Ancient Near East: Volume III: from the Hyksos to the Late Second Millennium BC. Oxford University Press. ISBN 978-0-19-068760-1.
- Robins, Gay (1993). Women in Ancient Egypt. Cambridge, MA: Harvard University Press. ISBN 0-674-95469-6.
- Redford, Donald B. (1967). History and Chronology of the 18th dynasty of Egypt: Seven studies. Toronto: University of Toronto Press.
- Roehrig, Catharine H. (2005). Hatshepsut: From Queen to Pharaoh. New York: The Metropolitan Museum of Art. ISBN 978-0300111392.
  - Roehrig, Catharine H.; Dreyfus, Renée; Keller, Cathleen A. Introduction. In Roehrig (2005), pp. 3–7.
  - Dorman, Peter (2005a). "Hatshepsut: Princess to Queen to Co-Ruler". In Roehrig (2005), pp. 87–95.
  - Keller, Cathleen A. "The Joint Reign of Hatshepsut and Thutmose III". In Roehrig (2005), pp. 96–98.
  - Arnold, Dieter. "The Temple of Hatshepsut at Deir el-Bahri". In Roehrig (2005), pp. 135–140.
  - Roth, Ann Macy. "Hatshepsut's Mortuary Temple at Deir el-Bahri: Architecture as Political Statement". In Roehrig (2005), pp. 147–157.
  - Allen, James P. "The Military Campaign of Thutmose III". In Roehrig (2005), pp. 261–266.
  - Dorman, Peter (2005b). "The Proscription of Hatshepsut". In Roehrig (2005), pp. 267–269.
- Leprohon, Ronald J. (2013). The Great Name: Ancient Egyptian Royal Titulary. SBL Press. ISBN 978-1-58983-736-2.
- Salisbury, Joyce E. (2001). Encyclopedia of Women in the Ancient World. Santa Barbara, Calif.: ABC-CLIO. ISBN 9781576070925.
- Sarll, Alex (20 February 2015). "Book review: The Woman Who Would Be King: Hatshepsut's Rise To Power In Ancient Egypt by Kara Cooney". Press and Journal.
- Seawright, Caroline (6 November 2000). "Hatshepsut: Female Pharaoh of Egypt". Archived from the original on 16 August 2018.
- Shirley, JJ E. (2014). "The Power of the Elite: The Officials of Hatshepsut's Regency and Coregency". In Galán, José M.; Bryan M., Betsy; Dorman, Peter F. (eds.). Creativity and Innovation in the Reign of Hatshepsut. Chicago: Oriental Institute of the University of Chicago. ISBN 978-1-61491-024-4.
- Stiebing, William H. Jr. (2016). Ancient Near Eastern History and Culture. Routledge. ISBN 978-1-315-51116-0. Archived from the original on 13 November 2020.
- Steindorff, George; Seele, Keith (1942). When Egypt Ruled the East. University of Chicago.
- Szafrański, Zbigniew E. (2014). "The Exceptional Creativity of Hatshepsut". In Galán, José M.; Bryan M., Betsy; Dorman, Peter F. (eds.). Creativity and Innovation in the Reign of Hatshepsut. Chicago: Oriental Institute of the University of Chicago. ISBN 978-1-61491-024-4.
- Thimes, J. L. (2008). "A Dental Observation". Kmt. 19 (3).
- Tyson, Peter (16 March 1999). "The Unfinished Obelisk". NOVA online adventure. Archived from the original on 22 August 2017.
- Tyldesley, Joyce (1996). Hatchepsut: The Female Pharaoh. London: Viking. ISBN 978-0-670-85976-4.
- Tyldesley, Joyce (2006). Chronicle of the Queens of Egypt: From Early Dynastic Times To The Death Of Cleopatra. Thames & Hudson. ISBN 978-0-500-05145-0.
- Waddell, W. G., ed. (1940). Manetho. Loeb Classical Library. Cambridge, MA: Harvard University Press.
- Wells, Evelyn (1969). Hatshepsut. Garden City, NY: Doubleday.
- Wilford, John Noble (27 June 2007). "Tooth May Have Solved Mummy Mystery". The New York Times. Archived from the original on 9 June 2017.
- Wilkinson, Toby (2010). The Rise and Fall of Ancient Egypt. London: Bloomsbury. ISBN 978-1-4088-1002-6.
- Wright, Jonathan (27 June 2007). "Tooth Clinches Identification of Egyptian Queen". Reuters. Archived from the original on 11 January 2008.
