= Aidan Dodson =

English Egyptologist and historian (born 1962)

Aidan Mark Dodson (born in London on 11 September 1962 is an English Egyptologist and historian. He has been honorary professor of Egyptology at the University of Bristol since 1 August 2018.

== Academic career ==
Dodson studied at Langley Grammar School (1975–81), before moving to Collingwood College, Durham (1981-2). He completed a BA at the University of Liverpool (1985), and an MPhil (1986, museum practice and archaeology) and PhD (1995, Egyptology) at Christ's College, Cambridge. He began teaching at the University of Bristol in October 1996, also holding the post of Simpson Professor of Egyptology at the American University in Cairo from January to July 2013. His primary research interests concern Ancient Egypt, with a particular focus on dynastic history and chronology, tomb architecture, sarcophagus and coffin design, canopic equipment, and the history of Egyptology; he is also an historian of late 19th and early 20th century navies, and has written on the royal tombs of Great Britain.

He is the prolific author of over twenty books, and 300 articles and reviews.

Dodson was elected a Fellow of the Society of Antiquaries of London in 2003. His wife is Dyan Hilton.

== Published books ==
=== Egyptology ===
1. The Length of the Third Intermediate Period JACF: Vol 2 (1988) pp.58-59
2. Egyptian Rock-cut Tombs (1991)
3. The Canopic Equipment of the Kings of Egypt (1994)
4. Monarchs of the Nile (1995) (Revised Editions in 2001 and 2015)
5. After the Pyramids (2000)
6. The Hieroglyphs of Ancient Egypt (2001)
7. The Pyramids of Ancient Egypt (2003)
8. The Complete Royal Families of Ancient Egypt (with Dyan Hilton) (2004) (2010, Revised Edition)
9. Ancient Egypt: Pyramids and Hieroglyphs (2006)
10. The Tomb in Ancient Egypt (with Salima Ikram) (2008)
11. Amarna Sunset: Nefertiti, Tutankhamun, Ay, Horemheb, and the Egyptian Counter-Reformation (2009) (2018, Revised Edition)
12. Poisoned Legacy: The Fall of the Nineteenth Egyptian Dynasty (2010) (2016, Revised Edition) Preview
13. Afterglow of Empire: Egypt from the Fall of the New Kingdom to the Saite Renaissance (2012) (2020, Revised Edition)
14. Amarna Sunrise: Egypt from Golden Age to Age of Heresy, 2014
15. ANCIENT EGYPTIAN COFFINS: THE MEDELHAVSMUSEET COLLECTION © Copyright 2015 National Museums of World Culture
16. The Royal Tombs of Ancient Egypt (2016) Partial PDF Preview
17. Sethy I, King of Egypt: His Life and Afterlife (2018)
18. Rameses III, King of Egypt: His Life and Afterlife (2019)
19. Nefertiti, Queen and Pharaoh of Egypt: Her Life and Afterlife (2020) Partial PDF
20. The First Pharaohs, Their Lives and Afterlives (2021)
21. Tutankhamun, King of Egypt: His Life and Afterlife (2022)
22. The Nubian Pharaohs of Egypt: Their Lives and Afterlives (2023) Partial PDF
23. Thutmose III and Hatshepsut, Pharaohs of Egypt: Their Lives and Afterlives (2025)
24. The Libyan Pharaohs of Egypt: Their Lives and Afterlives (2025)

=== Other books ===
1. The Royal Tombs of Great Britain (2004) (2017, Revised Edition)
2. The Kaiser's Battlefleet: German Capital Ships 1871-1918 (2015)
3. Before the Battecruiser: The Big Cruiser in the World's Navies 1865-1910 (2018)
4. German Battleship Helgoland (2019)
5. Spoils of War: The Fate of Enemy Fleets after the Two World Wars (with Serena Cant) (2020)
6. The Kaiser's Cruisers 1871-1918 (with Dirk Nottelmann) (2021)
7. The Windfall Battleships: Agincourt, Canada, Erin, Eagle and the Balkan and Latin American Arms Races (2023)

=== Articles ===
- Aidan Dodson, “The Royal Tomb at Amarna Revisited” pp.47-59 in THE JOURNAL OF THE SOCIETY FOR THE STUDY OF EGYPTIAN ANTIQUITIES, (ed: Sarah L. Ketchley and Edmund S. Meltzer), VOLUME XLV, Toronto Canada, 2018-2019
- Aidan Dodson, Thutmose III: Family Man in The Ostracon: The Journal of the Egyptian Study Society, Vol.15, No.2, Summer 2004, pp.3-7
