= Gay Robins =

British Egyptologist and art historian

Rosemary Gay Robins (born 28 June 1951), known professionally as Gay Robins, is a British Egyptologist and art historian who is professor emerita of art history at Emory University. Her research focuses on ancient Egyptian art, particularly artistic composition and the representation of gender and sexuality.

== Education and career ==
Robins studied at Durham University, where she was a member of St Aidan's College. She graduated in Chinese studies in 1972 and Egyptology in 1975. She later studied at the University of Oxford, completing a DPhil in Egyptology in 1981 under the supervision of John Baines.

From 1979 to 1983, Robins was the Lady Wallis Budge Research Fellow at Christ's College, Cambridge. She joined Emory University as an assistant professor in 1988, becoming associate professor in 1994 and professor in 1998. In 2003, she was appointed Samuel Candler Dobbs Professor of Art History. Robins also served as Faculty Curator of Ancient Egyptian Art at Emory's Michael C. Carlos Museum from 1988 to 1997. She retired from Emory in 2018 and became professor emerita.

== Selected publications ==
- Egyptian Painting and Relief. Princes Risborough: Shire Publications. 1986. ISBN 978-0-85263-789-0.
- Women in Ancient Egypt. London: British Museum Press. 1993. ISBN 978-0-7141-0956-5.
- Proportion and Style in Ancient Egyptian Art. Austin: University of Texas Press. 1994. ISBN 978-0-292-77064-5.
- The Art of Ancient Egypt. London: British Museum Press. 1997. ISBN 978-0-7141-0988-6.
