= Kmt (magazine) =

Magazine about ancient Egypt

- Spring 2008 issue of Kmt magazine
- Editor: Dennis C. Forbes
- Categories: History, archaeology, Near-Eastern studies
- Frequency: Quarterly
- Publisher: Carl A. Kojis
- Total circulation: 13,878 (2007)
- First issue: Spring 1990
- Company: KMT Communications
- Country: United States
- Based in: Weaverville, North Carolina
- Language: English
- Website: www.kmtjournal.com
- ISSN: 1053-0827

Kmt was a magazine on ancient Egypt published quarterly by Kmt Communications. The first issue was published in spring 1990. The magazine was produced in Weaverville, North Carolina, and featured stories, reports from recent excavations, announcements of upcoming lectures and symposia, and book reviews. The name of the magazine was derived from "km.t", the name of Ancient Egypt in hieroglyphics.

Kmt magazine became defunct with its Winter 2022-2023 issue, partly due to the rising costs of mail and stamps (according to an EEF Forum message by editor Dennis Forbes). However, back issues of Kmt magazine are still available.
