= Sitre In =

Ancient Egyptian lady, nurse of Hatshepsut

ra G39 t
Sit-re
in hieroglyphs
Era: New Kingdom
(1550–1069 BC)

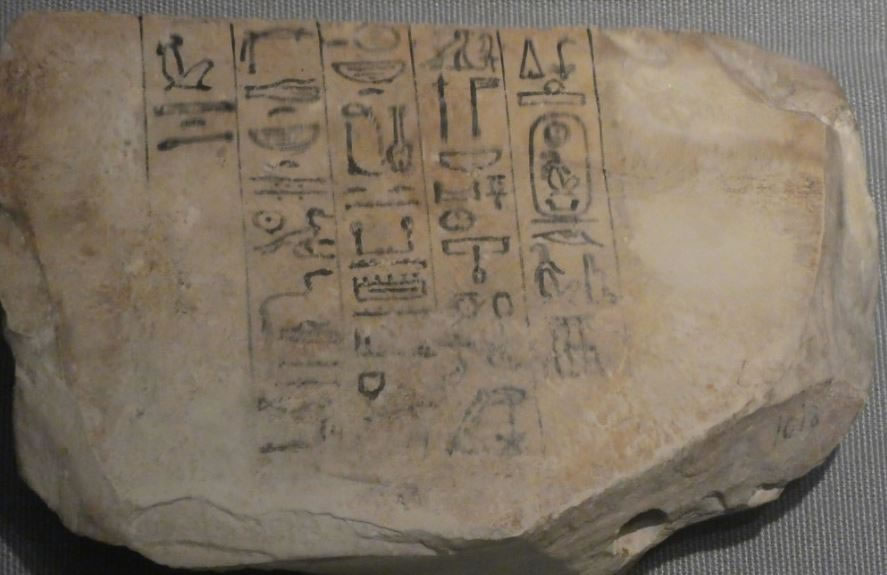
Ostracon, Vienna with an inscription for a statue of Sitre In

The ancient Egyptian noble Sitre In (or Sitra In, or Sit-re known as In or Inet, or simply Sitre) was buried in the Valley of the Kings, in tomb KV60. She has been identified as the nurse of Hatshepsut. A life-sized statue of her holding Hatshepsut is inscribed with her charge, which is repeated on an ostrakon now in Vienna. Although not a member of the royal family, she received the honour of a burial in the royal necropolis. Her coffin has the inscription wr šdt nfrw nswt In, identifying her as the Great Royal Wet Nurse In, and her well-preserved mummified body was found inside the coffin.
