= Salima Ikram =

Pakistani egyptologist (born 1965)

- Ikram in 2015
- Born: 17 May 1965 (age 61); Lahore, Pakistan
- Education: Bryn Mawr College; University of Cambridge
- Scientific career
- Fields: Egyptology
- Workplaces: American University in Cairo
- Website: salimaikram.com

Salima Ikram (Urdu: سلیمہ اکرام; born 17 May 1965) is a Pakistani professor of Egyptology at the American University in Cairo, a participant in many Egyptian archaeological projects, the author of several books on Egyptian archaeology, a contributor to various magazines and a guest on pertinent television programs.

== Early life and education ==
Ikram was born in Lahore, Pakistan, in 1965. She developed an interest in archaeology at the age of eight upon receiving copies of Nathaniel Hawthorne's Tanglewood Tales and Ancient Egypt by Time Life Books Editors. A visit to Egypt when she was nine heightened her interest in Egyptology.

Ikram studied Egyptology and Archaeology at Bryn Mawr College, earning a BA degree in Classical and Near Eastern Archaeology and History. Continuing her studies at the University of Cambridge, she earned her M.Phil. and PhD in Egyptology and Museum Studies. Her PhD thesis was entitled "Choice cuts: meat production in Ancient Egypt".

== Career ==
Ikram lives in Cairo and teaches Egyptology and Archaeology at the American University in Cairo, where she is a Distinguished Professor of Egyptology. In 2017, Ikram was a visiting professor at Yale University for the fall term. There she taught the courses Death and Burial, and Food and Drink in Ancient Egypt. She was elected to the American Academy of Arts and Sciences in 2017 as an international honorary member.

Ikram is the co-director of the Animal Mummy Project at the Egyptian Museum. Since 2001, she has directed the North Kharga Oasis Survey (NKOS) with Corinna Rossi, and directed the North Kharga Oasis Darb Ain Amur Survey and the Amenmesse Mission of KV10 and KV63 in the Valley of the Kings. She has also worked with André Veldmeijer of the Netherlands-Flemish Institute in Cairo on the Ancient Egypt Leatherwork Project (AELP). She co-directed the Predynastic Gallery Project.

Ikram has an active media presence, contributing to articles on Egyptology in Egypt Today and National Geographic. She has also written for Kmt, a journal of modern Egyptology. Ikram has appeared on documentary series and specials for PBS, Channel 4, Discovery Channel, History Channel, National Geographic Channel, Netflix, and the BBC. She has been featured in over 30 documentaries and specials focusing on her area of expertise. Some of her television credits include 'Unearthing Ancient Secrets: Animal Mummies' on Sci Channel; 'Da Vinci Code: Decoded' on Channel 4 UK; 'Tomb Raiders: Robbing the Dead' on History Channel; and 'The Real Scorpion King' on History Channel. Tomb of Saqqara on Netflix, in which she featured, reached #5 on Netflix's Most Watched Shows during 2021. She has also served as an advisor on the Universal Pictures movie The Mummy. She acted in the 2020 film Luxor (dir. Zeina Durra).

In 2018, Ikram participated in Tenerife (Spain), in the international congress "Athanatos. Inmortal. Muerte e inmortalidad en las poblaciones del pasado". During this congress, there was an exhibition of mummies from different parts of the world, including the Guanche mummies of the ancient inhabitants of the island of Tenerife, with a technique similar to the Egyptian mummies.

She lectures year-round at various conferences, museums, and more around the world. Courses that she has taught include Material Culture; Introduction to Egyptian Architecture; Research Seminar; Site Analysis; Art and Architecture of Ancient Egypt II; Culture and Society of Ancient Egypt; Death and Burial in Ancient Egypt; Cult and Society of Ancient Egypt; and Selected Topics in Cultural Resource Management and Museology.

Her research interests include Funerary Archaeology, Daily Life, Archaeozoology, Rock Art, Cultural Heritage and Museology, Experimental Archaeology, Ethnoarchaeology, and Bioarchaeology.

To date, Ikram is the only female Pakistani archaeologist working in Egypt.

== Awards and honorary degrees ==
- Excellence in Research Award by The American University in Cairo (2006).
- Annual Award in Investigation by the Spanish Geographical Society (2013).
- Elected to the American Academy of Arts and Sciences (2017).

== Published works ==
- Choice Cuts: Meat Production in Ancient Egypt (Leuven: Peeters, 1995); ISBN 9068317458.
- Pyramids (Cairo: Zeitouna, 1995); ISBN 9774244648.
- Royal Mummies in the Egyptian Museum (with Aidan Dodson, Cairo: Zeitouna/American University in Cairo Press, 1997); ISBN 9774244311.
- The Mummy in Ancient Egypt: Equipping the Dead for Eternity (with Aidan Dodson, New York: Thames & Hudson/Cairo: AUC Press, 1998); ISBN 0500050880.
- 'Diet in: Oxford Encyclopedia of Ancient Egypt (New York: Oxford University Press, 2001); ISBN 9780195102345.
- Catalogue général of Egyptian antiquities in the Cairo Museum: 24048/24056, Non-human mummies (Cairo: Supreme Council of Antiquities Press, 2002); ISBN 9773052753.
- Death and Burial in Ancient Egypt (Longman, 2003); ISBN 0582772168
- Divine Creatures: Animal Mummies In Ancient Egypt (American University in Cairo Press, 2005); ISBN 9781936190010.
- The Tomb in Ancient Egypt: royal and private sepulchres from the early dynastic period to the Romans (with Aidan Dodson, London & New York: Thames & Hudson/Cairo: AUC Press, 2008); ISBN 9780500051399.
- 'Meat Processing' in Nicholson, P. and Shaw, I. Ancient Egyptian Materials and Technology (Cambridge: Cambridge University Press, 2009); ISBN 9780521120982.
- Ancient Egypt: An Introduction (New York: Cambridge University Press, 2010); ISBN 9780521675987.
- Ancient Nubia: African Kingdoms on the Nile (edited, with M. Fisher, P. Lacovara, and S. D'Auria, Cairo: AUC Press, 2012); ISBN 9789774164781.
- Chasing Chariots: Proceedings of the First International Chariot Conference (Cairo 2012) (edited, with André J. Veldmeijer, Amsterdam: Sidestone, 2012); ISBN 9789088902093.
- Egyptian Bioarchaeology: Humans, Animals, and the Environment (with Jessica Kaiser; Roxie Walker, Cambridge: Cambridge University Press, 2015); ISBN 9789088902888.
- Divine Creatures: Animal Mummies in Ancient Egypt (Cairo: The American University in Cairo, 2016); ISBN 9789774166969.
- Animals in Ancient Egypt: Then and Now (with Richard Hoath) (Cairo: The American University in Cairo, 2026) ISBN 978-1649035080

=== Works for young readers ===
- Egyptology (Amideast, 1997)
- In Ancient Egypt: Gods and Temples (Los Altos, CA: Hoopoe Books Ltd, 1998)
- In Ancient Egypt: Mummies and Tombs (Los Altos, CA: Hoopoe Books Ltd, 1998)
- Pharaohs (Amideast, 1997)
- Land and People (Amideast, 1997)

== Archaeological tours ==
Salima Ikram leads Egyptology tours for Far Horizons Archaeological and Cultural trips and Ancient World Tours
