= Collegio di Milano =

Coordinates: 45.4356°N 9.1639°E

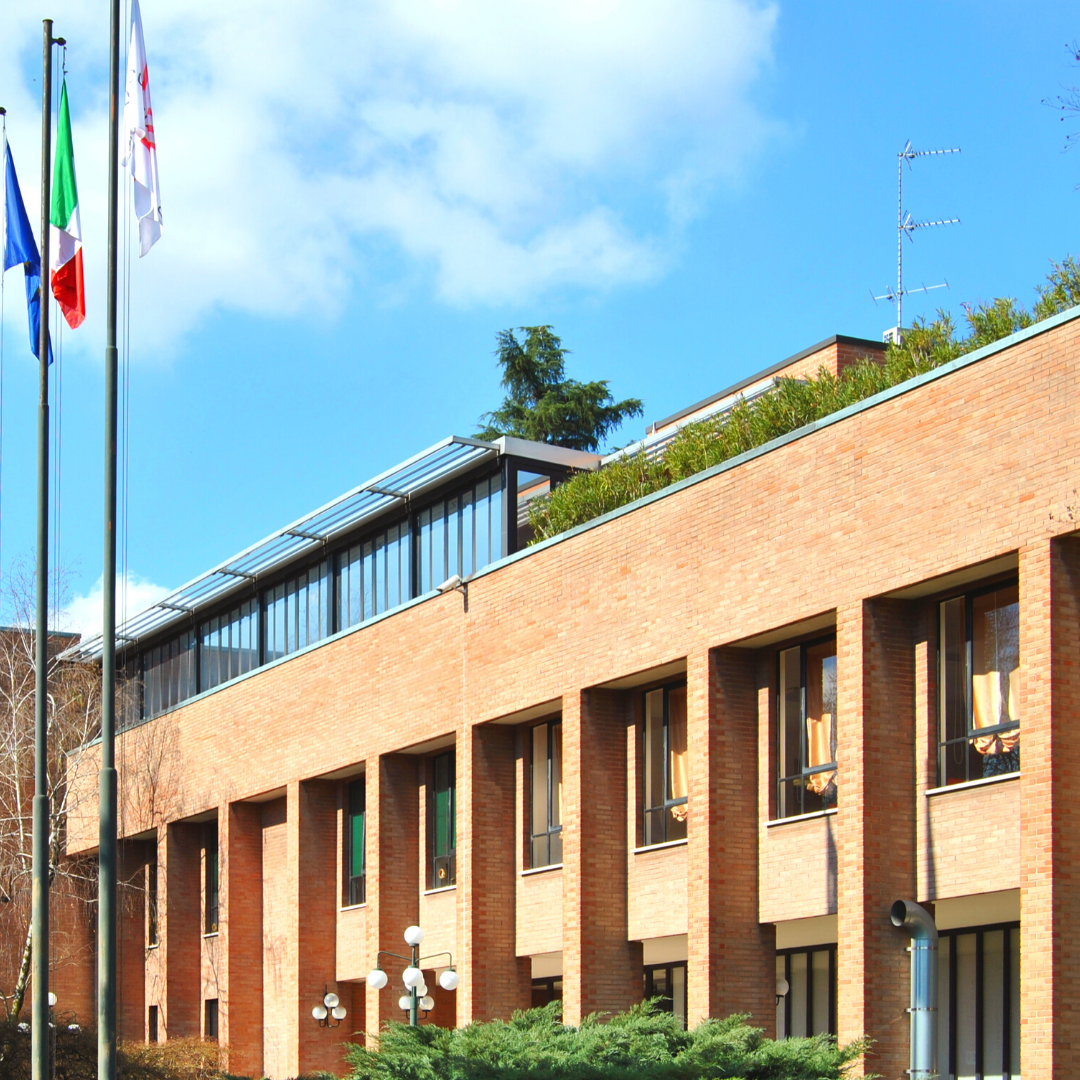

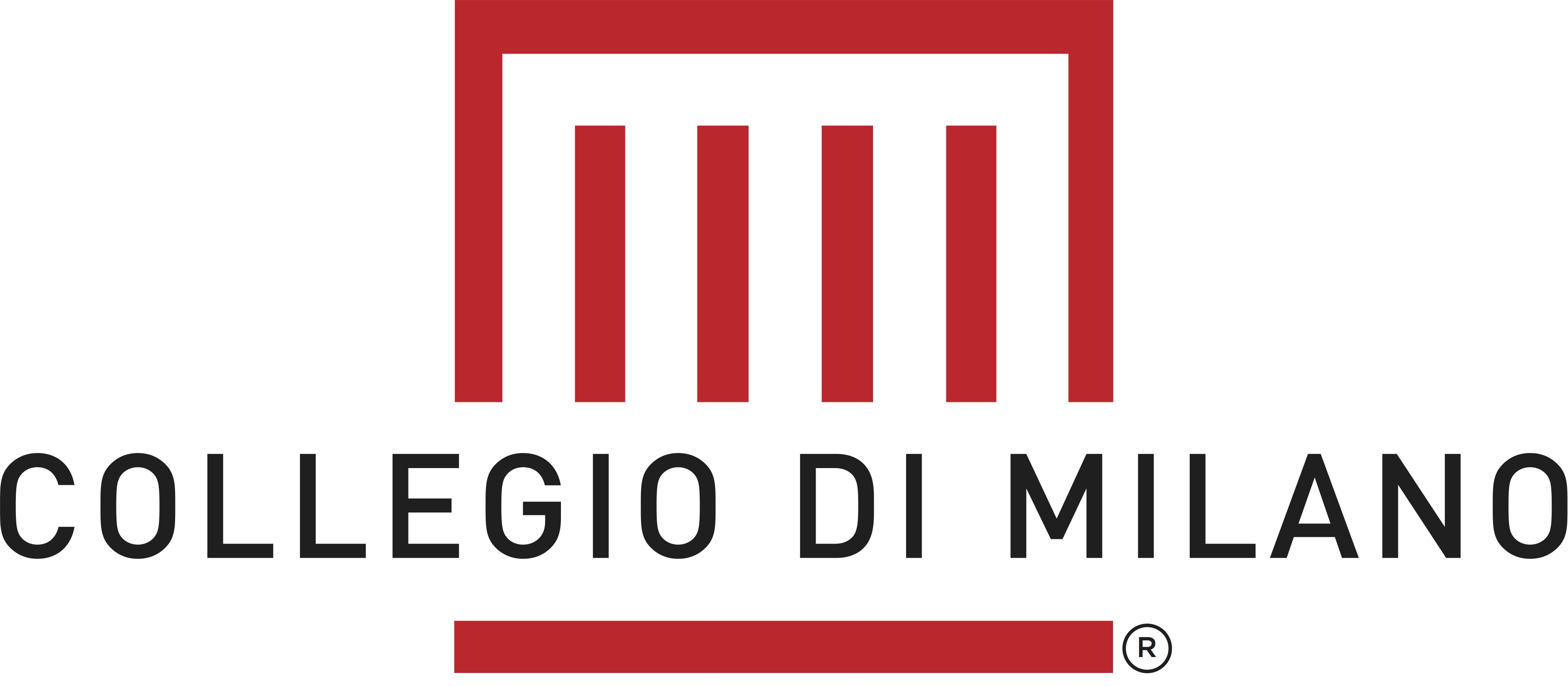
- Location: Via San Vigilio, 10 20142 Milan ()
- Full name: Fondazione Collegio delle Università Milanesi – Collegio di Milano
- Established: 2003
- Undergraduates: 171
- Website: www.collegiodimilano.it/en/

The Collegio di Milano is a merit-based inter-university campus intended to accommodate Italian and foreign students from public and private universities in Milan, who have demonstrated unique talent and enthusiasm in their studies and have obtained outstanding results. The Collegio is a nonprofit organisation made possible by a foundation composed of seven universities and public and private businesses.

It is officially recognized and credited as a Merit-based University Campus by MUR (Ministry of Universities and Research).

To be accepted to the Collegio di Milano it is necessary to participate in the call for applications, adhering to the indicated requirements, and go through the selection process.

== History ==
The Collegio di Milano, inaugurated on 29 September 2003, was founded by a group of public and private businesses and organisations, among which are seven of Milan's universities (the University of Milan, the Politecnico, the University of Milano-Bicocca, Catholic University of Milan, Bocconi University, IULM University, Vita-Salute San Raffaele University) and Aspen Institute Italy. For the realisation of this project several high-profile figures participated: Filippo de Vivo, Umberto Eco, Carlo Ratti e Marco Santambrogio. The birth of the Collegio di Milano, in fact, was inspired by the so-called Cambridge Manifest, a proposal for Italian universities drafted in 1997 by a group of Italian doctoral students at Cambridge University, among them de Vivo and Ratti, and supported by numerous academics and intellectuals, including Eco and Santambrogio.

Since 2008 the managing director has been Stefano Blanco. The President of the Foundation is Salvatore Carrubba, successor to Giancarlo Lombardi who after Carrubba's nomination was the honorary president until his passing in 2017. At the head of the Scientific Committee is Susanna Mantovani, Italian pedagogist and winner of the Ambrogino d'Oro in 2020.

== Activities and facilities ==
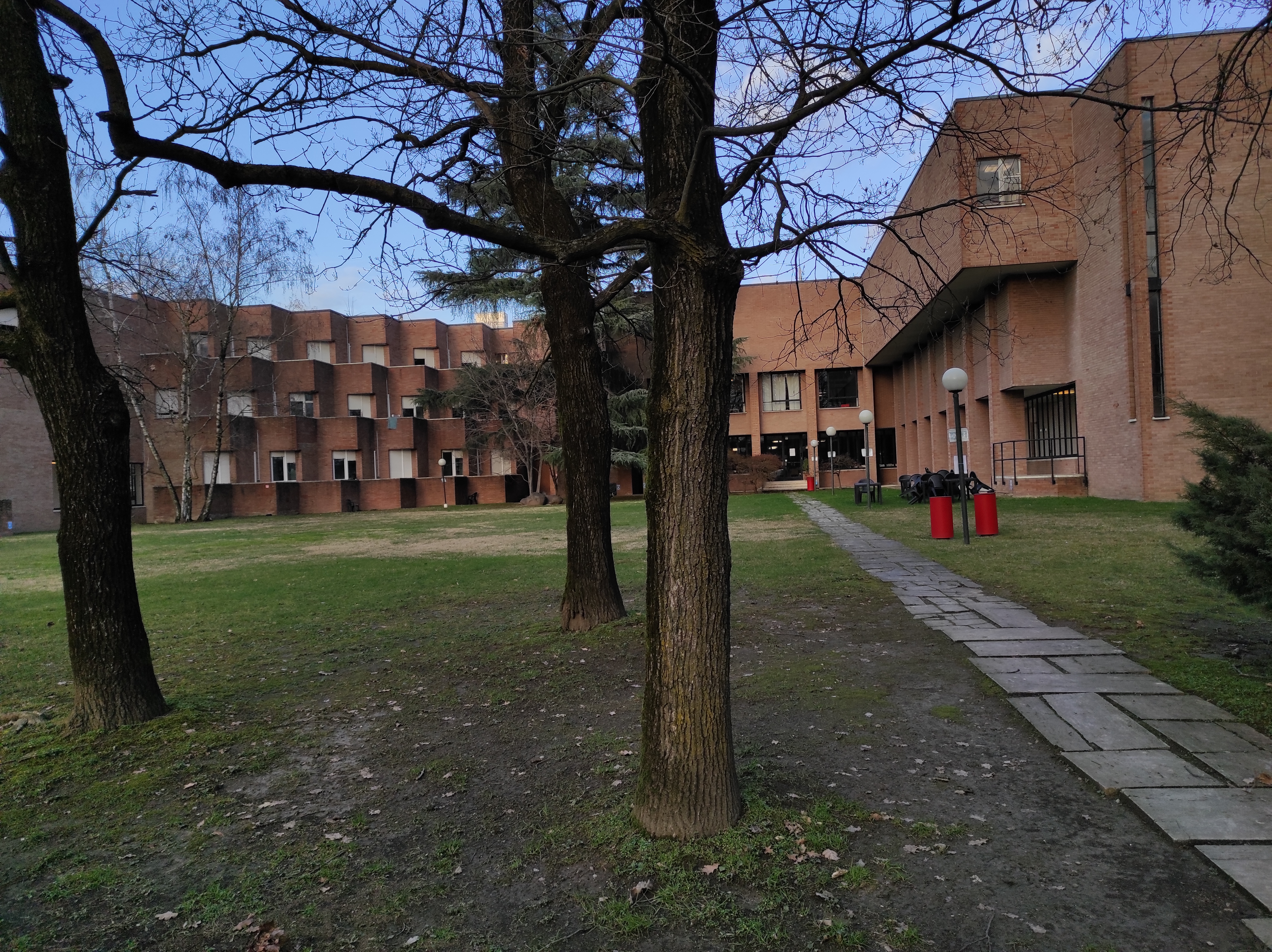
Detail of the building designed by Marco Zanuso where one can see the French doors on the private terraces enclosed in sandblasted solid brick walls.

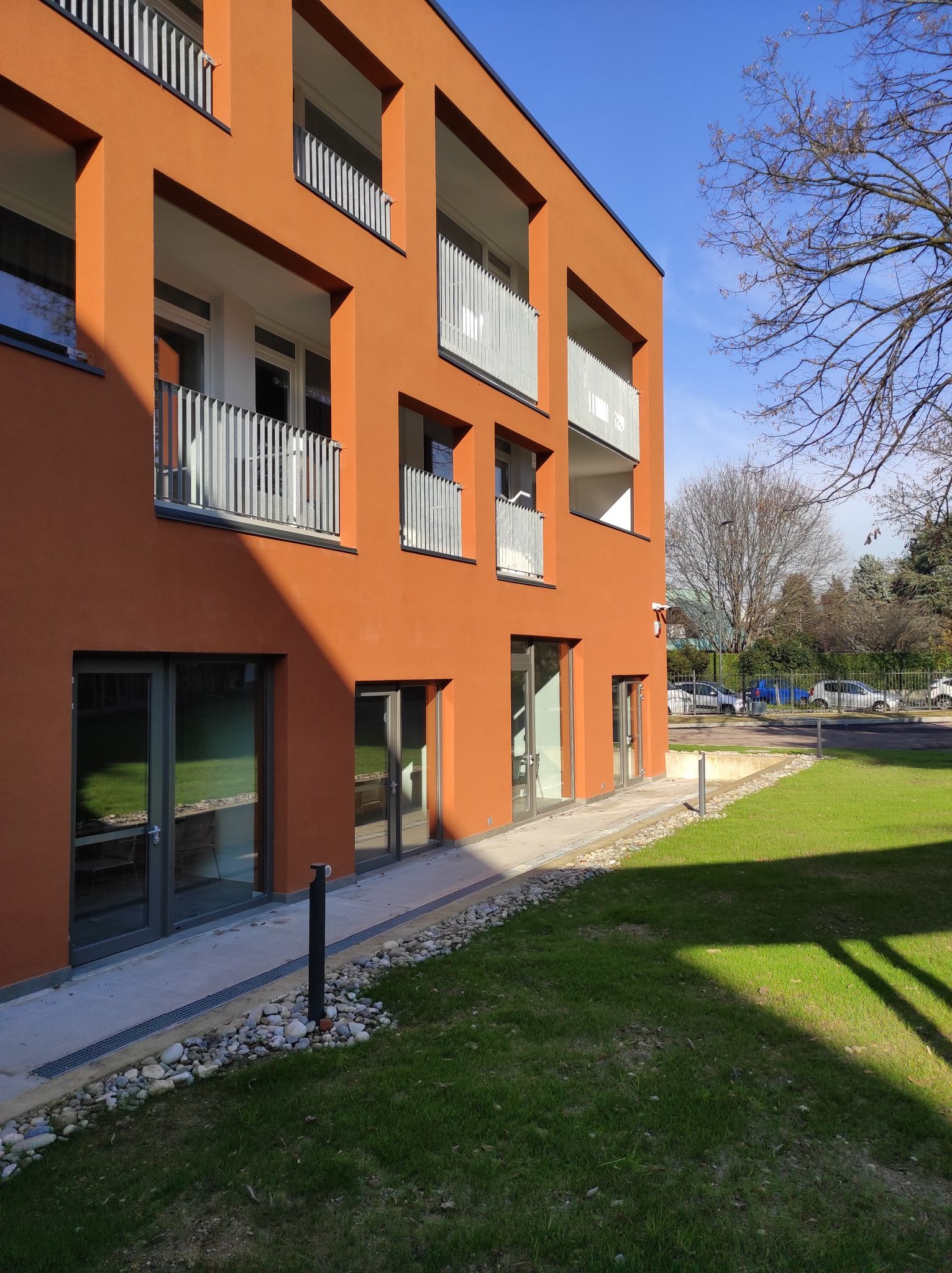
The second Collegio di Milano building, designed by Studio Piuarch.

The campus, designed by the architect Marco Zanuso, is surrounded by a 30,000 square meters park. The complex was built between 1971 and 1974 and was originally intended to host the Center for economic relief for African countries (also known as FinAfrica) that for years welcomed international students specializing in the banking and financial sectors of developing nations. The Collegio's original building design evokes the brutalism of Andrew Melville Hall designed by James Stirling and built in 1967 for St. Andrews University.

In 2020 a second building was launched, initiated by Studio Piuarch's project, winner of the competition held by the Foundation in 2008 to expand the campus, adding another 53 accommodations to the 118 existing students. Piurach's design proposal comes into fruition in the juxtaposition with a new building that is physically and functionally independent from the Zanuso building, and that affirms its own uniqueness, even after considering the current and historical context in which it stands.

Students accepted to the Collegio di Milano enjoy educational and residential services intended to provide them with a context where they can get the best out of their studies all within a multi-disciplinary and international educational setting that promotes personal and professional growth.

In particular, students at the Collegio di Milano are accepted after a very careful selection process. Students are offered an educational course path parallel and complementary to their university program, in heterogeneous fields with respect to their academic fields of study. The Collegio also provides tutoring, international relations and career services to guide its students when deciding on their academic paths and when joining the world of work.

The Collegio di Milano students must continuously respect the Educational Pact and satisfy several academic requirements.

== Fondazione Collegio delle Università Milanesi ==
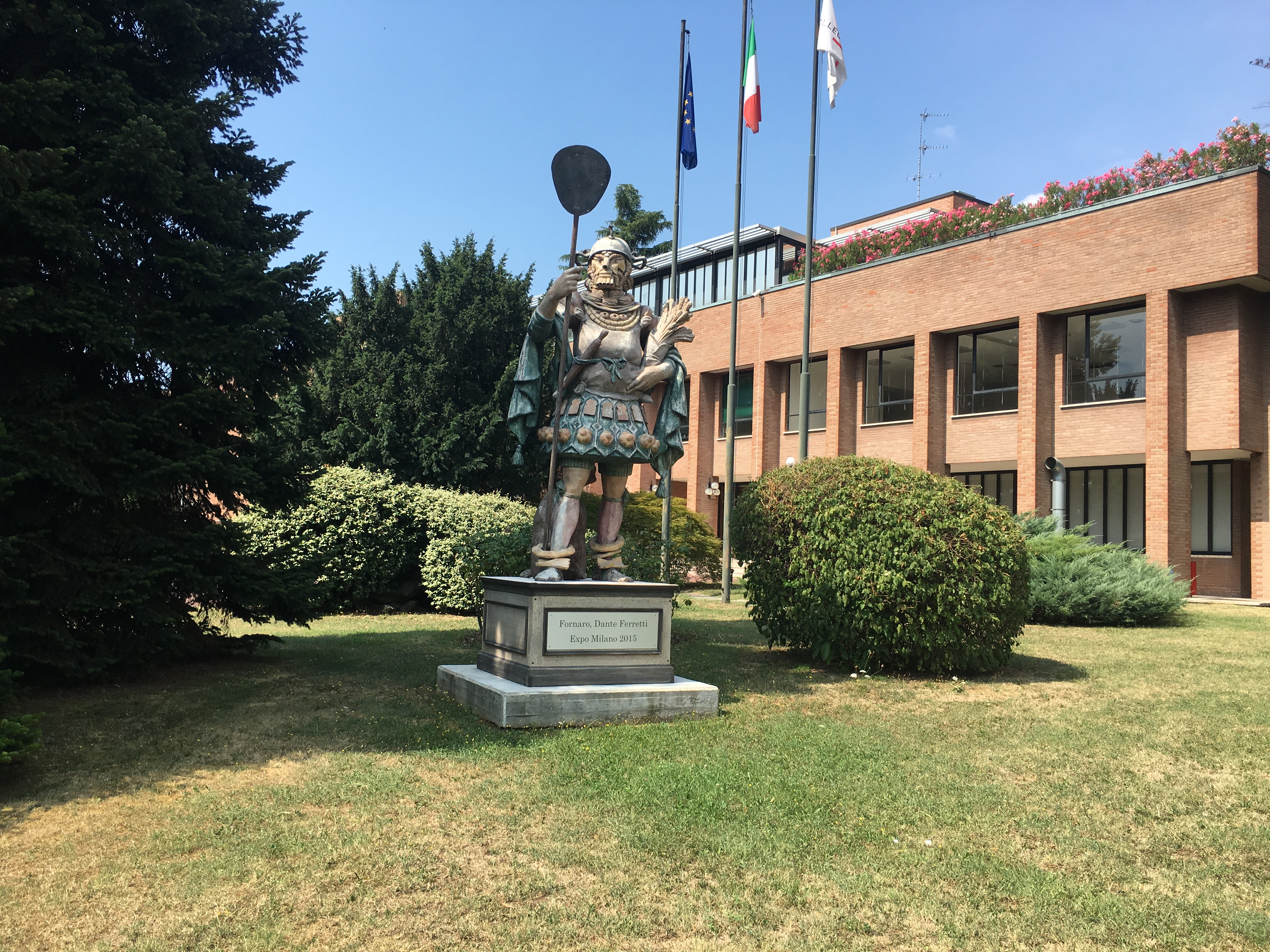
"Il Fornaro", the statue by Dante Ferretti created for the 2015 Milan Expo and donated to the Collegio di Milano.

The Collegio di Milano is brought to life by the Fondazione Collegio delle Università Milanesi, a non-profit organisation, sustained by seven universities in Milan and from important private and public businesses (Comune di Milano, Regione Lombardia, Camera di Commercio di Milano, Aspen Institute Italia, Assolombarda, Bracco, Edison, Intesa San Paolo, Mediaset e Pirelli) with the objective of being a reference point within the academic, institutional and business panorama in Italy and Europe.

The Foundation's activities are aimed at the diffusion and promotion of campus life, esteeming the merit based culture, globalization of the university system and at the integration of homegrown realities. Through studying the dynamics of temporary residency within multicultural contexts, such activities also work in promoting and incentivizing social mobility and active citizenship.

During the 2015 Milan Expo, the Collegio took part in the Expo College programme by offering accommodation to students coming from all over the world, fostering the coming together of different cultural perspectives, and had the complex job of managing the 2015 Milan Expo Village and all its related activities: a protected area adjacent to the Expo site, composed of 7 towers that hosted around 5,000 people from 130 nations over a period of ten months.

== Other University Colleges of Merit in Italy ==
- Collegio Borromeo
- Ghislieri College
