= Ineni =

Ancient Egyptian architect

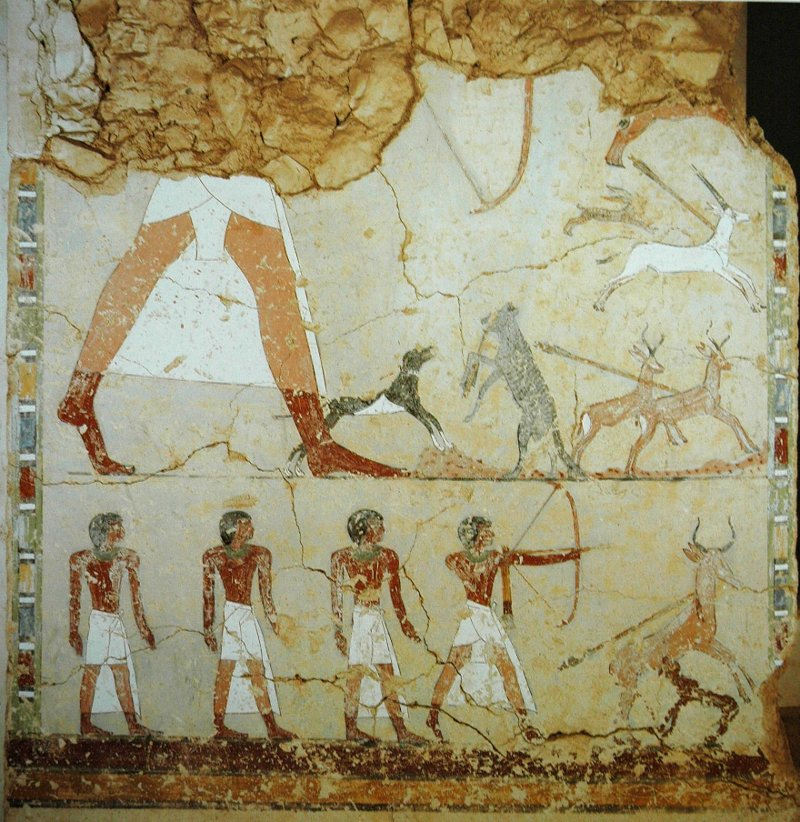
Ineni (upper left, partly destroyed) in a hunting scene from his tomb TT81.

Ineni (sometimes transliterated as Anena) was an ancient Egyptian architect and government official of the 18th Dynasty, responsible for major construction projects under the pharaohs Amenhotep I, Thutmose I, Thutmose II and the joint reigns of Hatshepsut and Thutmose III. He had many titles, including Superintendent of the Granaries, Superintendent of the Royal Buildings, Superintendent of the Workmen in the Karnak Treasuries, etc.

Ineni came from an aristocratic family and likely began his career as an architect under Amenhotep I. Amenhotep I commissioned Ineni to expand the Temple of Karnak. The expansion included a barque shrine of Amun and a new treasury. Ineni probably also oversaw the construction of Amenhotep I's tomb and mortuary temple. The mortuary temple was the first to be disconnected from the actual tomb, presumably so it would not draw attention to the burial site. Amenhotep I died before the treasury could be completed, but Ineni was retained by his successor, Thutmose I.

An avid builder, Thutmose I commissioned many construction projects during his rule, including the first tomb carved out at the Valley of the Kings. Many of his projects were at the Temple of Karnak and were under the supervision of Ineni. These works included the fourth and fifth pylons, numerous courts and statues, the completion of the Treasury expansion begun by Amenhotep I, and a hypostyle hall of cedar wood constructed at Karnak to commemorate Thutmose I's victory over the Hyksos.

After the death of Thutmose I, Ineni was once again retained by the royal family. During the reign of Hatshepsut, a new architect, Senemut, would gain major commissions; most notably the construction of her mortuary temple at Deir el-Bahri. Ineni, however, continued to supervise several structures commissioned by Hatshepsut and was likely consulted on many others. He was considered by his contemporaries to be one of her court favorites, and the steles on the walls of his tomb speak kindly of her. He died during the reign of Hatshepsut before Thutmose III assumed the throne in Hatshepsut's 22nd regnal year. His tomb was one of the few structures where Hatshepsut's name was not chiseled out or replaced, perhaps out of respect for him.
