= TT104 =

Theban tomb

Theban tomb TT104
- Burial site of Djehutynefer
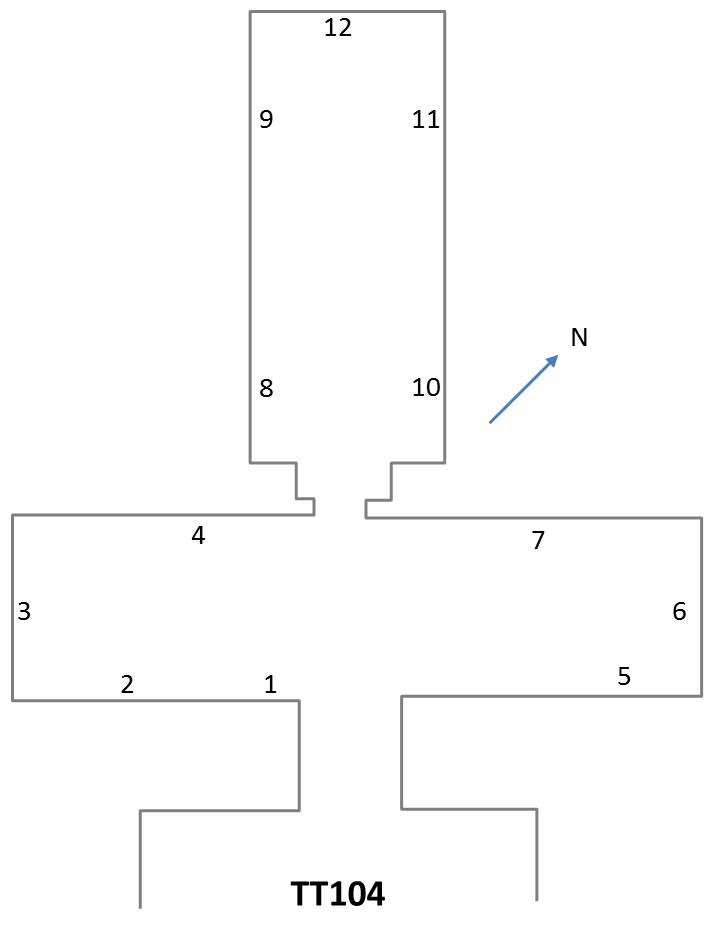
- Plan of the tomb chapel

- Location within Egypt
- Location: , Theban Necropolis
- ← Previous; TT103 Next → TT105

C3 nfr
Djehutynefer
in hieroglyphs
Era: New Kingdom
(1550–1069 BC)

The ancient Egyptian Theban Tomb no. 104 (TT104) belongs to the Overseer of the treasuries Djehutynefer, who was in office under king Amenhotep II. The tomb chapel is located in Sheikh Abd el-Qurna and is part of the Theban Necropolis, on the west bank of the Nile, opposite to Luxor. Djehutynefer had a second tomb in Thebes TT80. Tomb TT104 is decorated with paintings and has a T-shaped ground plan. The paintings are not always well preserved.

It was common for many highest officials to have two tombs; one tomb was the actual burial place, the other one most likely functioned as cult chapel, although most often both tombs had fully decorated tomb chapels. At both tomb chapels of Djehutynefer were found heavily looted burial chambers. Therefore, it is not known where he was finally buried.

== Tomb ==
In front of the tomb chapel there is an open courtyard, facing South with one burial shaft. From there, on the North side, is the entrance to the chapel. The first, broad hall is mainly decorated with daily life scenes. On the South wall, on the east side there is the most famous scene from the tomb showing the house of Djehutynefer. Three levels are depicted, indicating a three-storey house. Staircases are shown. In the second storey Djehutynefer is shown receiving offerings. In the first storey appear several scribes. The back (North wall) of this hall shows mainly rows of offering bearers as well as Djehutynefer and his wife sitting in front of an offering table. The short, West wall of this hall is decorated with a painted stela that once contained a longer biographical inscription. The text is today heavily destroyed. The opposite East wall shows Djehutynefer hunting in the marshes. The scene is not well preserved and was perhaps never finished.

The decoration in the second hall is mainly dedicated to funerary rites. There is shown a procession bringing burial goods, there are ships shown sailing to Abydos and there are several purification scenes depicted. The North, short end of the hall shows Djehutynefer and two women in front of the underworld god Osiris.

== See also ==
- List of Theban tombs

== Bibliography ==
- Bertha Porter, Rosalind L. B. Moss, Ethel W. Burney: Topographical Bibliography of Ancient Egyptian Hieroglyphic Texts, Reliefs, and Paintings. I. The Theban Necropolis. Part 1. Private Tombs 2. Second Edition Griffith Institute, Ashmolean Museum, Oxford 1970, pp. 157–159; (PDF-file; 21,9 MB); (online)
- Abdel Ghaffar Shedid: Stil der Grabmalereien in der Zeit Amenophis' II. untersucht an den thebanischen Gräbern Nr. 104 und Nr. 80, Verlag Philipp von Zabern 1988, pp. 111–162, pls. 48–75 (the full publication of the tomb, in German)
