= TT73 =

Theban tomb

Theban tomb TT73
- Burial site of Amenhotep
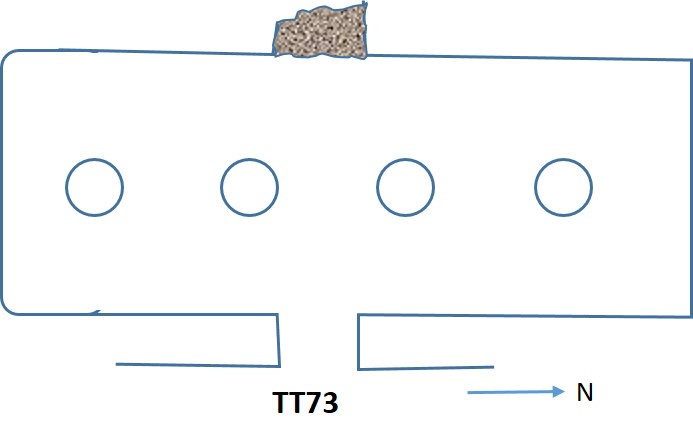

- Location within Egypt
- Location: Sheikh Abd el-Qurna, Theban Necropolis
- Discovered: c. 1957?
- ← Previous; TT72 Next → TT77

The Theban Tomb TT73 is located in Sheikh Abd el-Qurna. It forms part of the Theban Necropolis, situated on the west bank of the Nile opposite Luxor. The tomb is the burial place of the ancient Egyptian official Amenhotep. During his lifetime Amenhotep was given the titles: "Overseer of cattle" of Amun, "Overseer of Works" and "Chief steward and warrior of the king."

== Tomb ==
Theban Tomb TT73 was described in 1957 by Torgny Säve-Söderbergh as an unknown important official during the reign of Hatshepsut (18th Dynasty during 15th century BC). Located inside the tomb were gifts presented to the pharaoh which included a gold wrapped chariot. Inscriptions along the walls of TT73 include a depiction of Hatshepsut, who " appears arrayed like the sun-god himself, acting as an eternal intermediary for the tomb-owner". Also present is a badly damaged beekeeping scene on the northeast wall which was interpreted by Säve-Söderbergh.

== Buried ==
Amenhotep was an ancient Egyptian "Overseer of cattle" of Amun, "Overseer of Works" and "Chief steward and warrior of the king" in office during the reign of Queen Hatshepsut. He is mainly known from TT73 and from a series of rock-cut inscriptions in the Aswan region. His "Overseer of Works" title refers to his responsibility for the erection of two obelisks of the queen in Karnak in the 16th year of her reign. In the rock-cut inscriptions in the Aswan region (where the stone for the obelisks was quarried), he appears also with the titles of a high priest of the local deities Khnum, Satis and Anuket.

== See also ==
- List of Theban tombs
