= TT77 =

Theban tomb

Theban tomb TT77
- Burial site of Ptahemhat, usurped by Roy
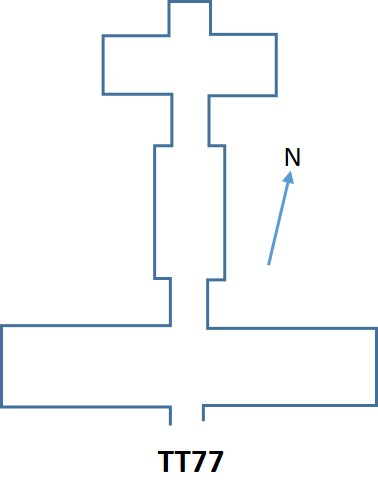
- Floor plan of TT77

- Location within Egypt
- Location: Sheikh Abd el-Qurna, Theban Necropolis
- ← Previous; TT73 Next → TT80

p t V28 G17 F4 t Z1
Ptahemhat
in hieroglyphs
Era: New Kingdom
(1550–1069 BC)

r Z1 i i
Roy
in hieroglyphs
Era: New Kingdom
(1550–1069 BC)

Theban Tomb 77 (TT 77) is located in Sheikh Abd el-Qurna, part of the Theban Necropolis, on the west bank of the Nile, opposite Luxor. It is the burial place of the Ancient Egyptian official named Ptahemhat, who was a child of the nursery, overseer of the works in the temple of Amun, and standard-bearer of the Lord of the Two Lands. The tomb dates to the reign of Tuthmosis IV.

The tomb has been known since the beginning of the 19th century. In 1837, John Gardner Wilkinson published a copy of a banquet scene. In 1847 Émile Prisse d'Avennes published the same scene with another register. Jean-François Champollion copied some of the inscriptions and noticed that the tomb had sustained a lot of damage. Karl Richard Lepsius copied further inscriptions. Other visitors came in the 20th century to draw or photograph scenes.

The decoration of the tomb chapel has never been completed. Shortly after the death of Ptahemhat, the head of the sculptor of the Lord of the Two Lands, Roy, usurped parts of the tomb decoration and had his name affixed there. The scenes of Ptahemhet and his wife Meryt were later usurped for the Overseer of the sculptors named Roy and his wife Rahuy.

As already indicated, the grave was not well preserved at the beginning of the 19th century. The tomb chapel carved into the rock is entered from the south. You get into a transverse hall. In the north, exactly opposite the entrance, there is a longitudinal hall and then a smaller transverse hall with a niche in the north. The decoration of the chapel is painted. The scenes obtained show various banquets. One scene shows King Tuthmosis IV sitting under a canopy. There is also a representation of the goddess Renenutet.

== See also ==
- List of Theban tombs
