= Senseneb =

- King's Mother (Mw.t-nswt)
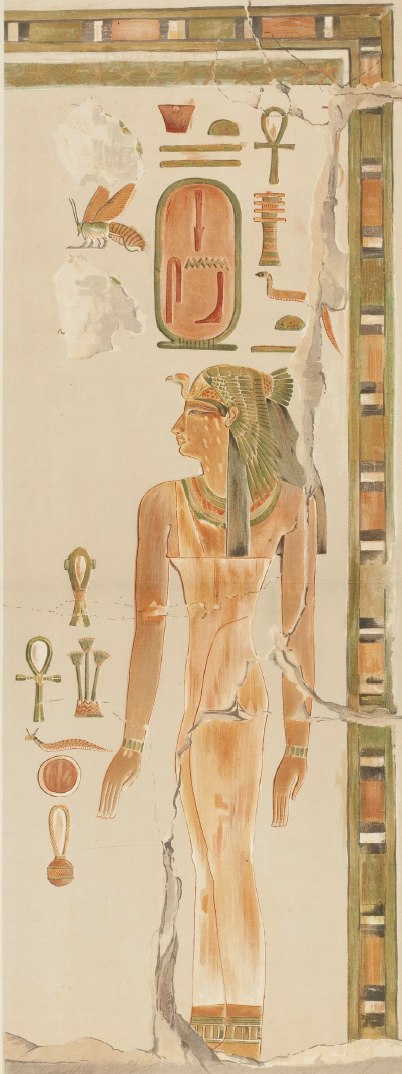
- Painted relief of Senseneb from Deir el-Bahri
- Issue: Thutmose I
Egyptian name
Snj snb
< sn S29 N35 D58 >
- Dynasty: Eighteenth Dynasty of Egypt
- Religion: Ancient Egyptian religion

Senseneb was the mother of Pharaoh Thutmose I in the Eighteenth Dynasty of the early New Kingdom.

== Attestations ==
Senseneb (sn⸗j-snb, also Seniseneb) bore the title of King's Mother (mwt-nsw) and is therefore thought to have been a commoner.

=== Wadi Halfa, Cairo CG 34006 ===
At Buhen in Wadi Halfa, a sandstone stela fragment dated to Year 1 of Thutmose I, mentions [...]; jmj-rꜣ ḫꜣst rsjt trj and King's Mother Senseneb (mwt-nsw sn⸗j-snb). She is shown swearing an oath of allegiance as the king's mother on the coronation of her son Thutmose I.

=== Deir el-Bahri PM 122, Mortuary Temple of Hatshepsut ===
At Deir el-Bahri, Senseneb is also depicted on painted reliefs from the Mortuary Temple of Hatshepsut. Here she has the title ḥnwt-tꜣwj meaning Mistress of the Two Lands.

=== Ashmolean AN1896-1908.E.3926 ===
A limestone pyramidion belonging to the lector priest of the king's mother Tety. It mentions King's Mother Senseneb and Djehuty, son of the lector priest who was the patron of this monument.

=== Berlin ÄM 15006 ===
A limestone statue of a seated man with the royal name of Thutmose I, belonging to lector priest of the king's mother and wab-priest of Hathor, the lady of Hu, Amenemhat. It also mentions King's Mother Senseneb.
