= TT80 =

Theban tomb

Theban tomb TT80
- Burial site of Djehutynefer
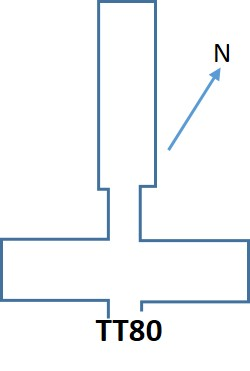
- Plan of the tomb chapel of TT80

- Location within Egypt
- Location: , Theban Necropolis
- ← Previous; TT77 Next → TT81

G26 t Z4 nfr f r
Djehutynefer
in hieroglyphs
Era: New Kingdom
(1550–1069 BC)

The ancient Egyptian Theban Tomb no. 80 (TT80) belongs to the Overseer of the treasuries Djehutynefer, who was in office under king Amenhotep II. The tomb chapel is located in Sheikh Abd el-Qurna and is part of the Theban Necropolis, on the west bank of the Nile, opposite to Luxor. Djehutynefer had a second tomb in Thebes TT104. Tomb TT80 is decorated with paintings and has a T-shaped ground plan. The paintings are partly well preserved.

The tomb has a courtyard open on one side and facing to the South with the remains of something that might be a small garden. There are several burial shaft within the tomb chapel. One unfinished shafts was dug in the courtyard. There are two other shafts guiding to undecorated burial chambers, each of them dug into the ground in the halls of the chapel.

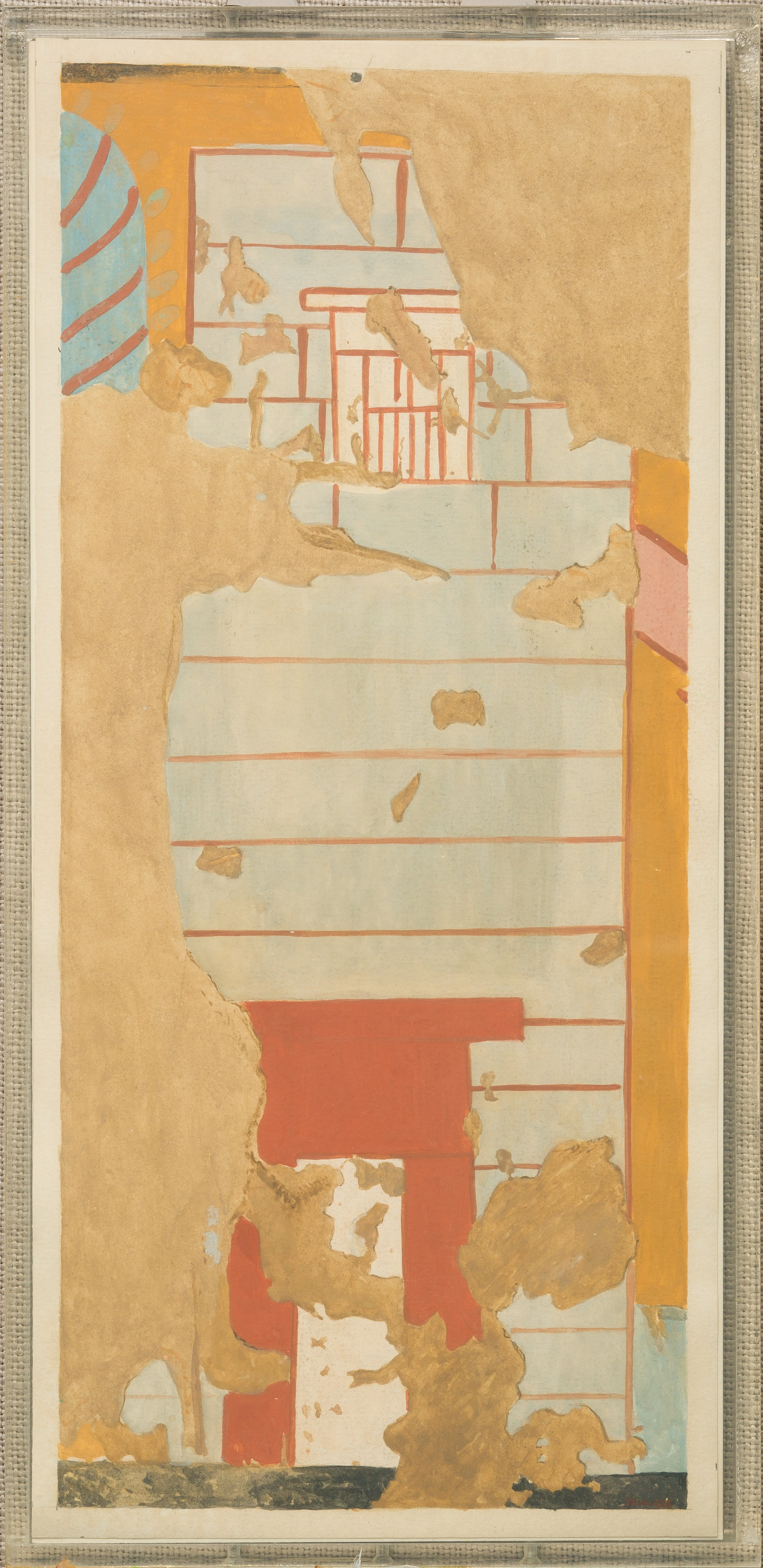
Facade of a House, depiction on the wall paintings in tomb TT80

The broad hall of the chapel shows a banquet scene on the North wall, on the right side of the entrance and on the South wall, also on the right side of the entrance is depicted an offering scene. In the latter scene different offering bearers are coming and Djehutynefer is shown making offerings. The paintings on the left of the entrance are not well preserved. Djehutynefer and his wife Takhat are show receiving bouquets. The banquet scenes include guests, a harpist, a and female lutist, clapper and lyre-player dancing.

The second, long hall shows on the West side Djehutynefer overlooking workmen. One of the registers depicts the deceased and his staff bringing and weighing Nubian tribute of ivory and gold, as well as recording grain. The East wall shows mainly scenes from funeral rituals. On the very back of the wall, on the short, North side, Djehutynefer is shown in front of the Underworld god Osiris. The background colour in the second hall is yellow, while a white background is more common in the 18th Dynasty.

== See also ==
- List of Theban tombs

== Bibliography ==
- Bertha Porter, Rosalind L. B. Moss, Ethel W. Burney: Topographical Bibliography of Ancient Egyptian Hieroglyphic Texts, Reliefs, and Paintings. I. The Theban Necropolis. Part 1. Private Tombs 2. Second Edition Griffith Institute, Ashmolean Museum, Oxford 1970, pp. 157–159; (PDF-file; 21,9 MB); (online)
- Abdel Ghaffar Shedid: Stil der Grabmalereien in der Zeit Amenophis' II. untersucht an den thebanischen Gräbern Nr. 104 und Nr. 80, Verlag Philipp von Zabern 1988, pp. 138–162, pls. 48-75 (the full publication of the tomb, in German)
