= Thutmose I =

Third Egyptian Pharaoh of the 18th Dynasty (c. 1506 – 1493 BC)

- Thutmosis, Tuthmosis, Thothmes in Latinized Greek
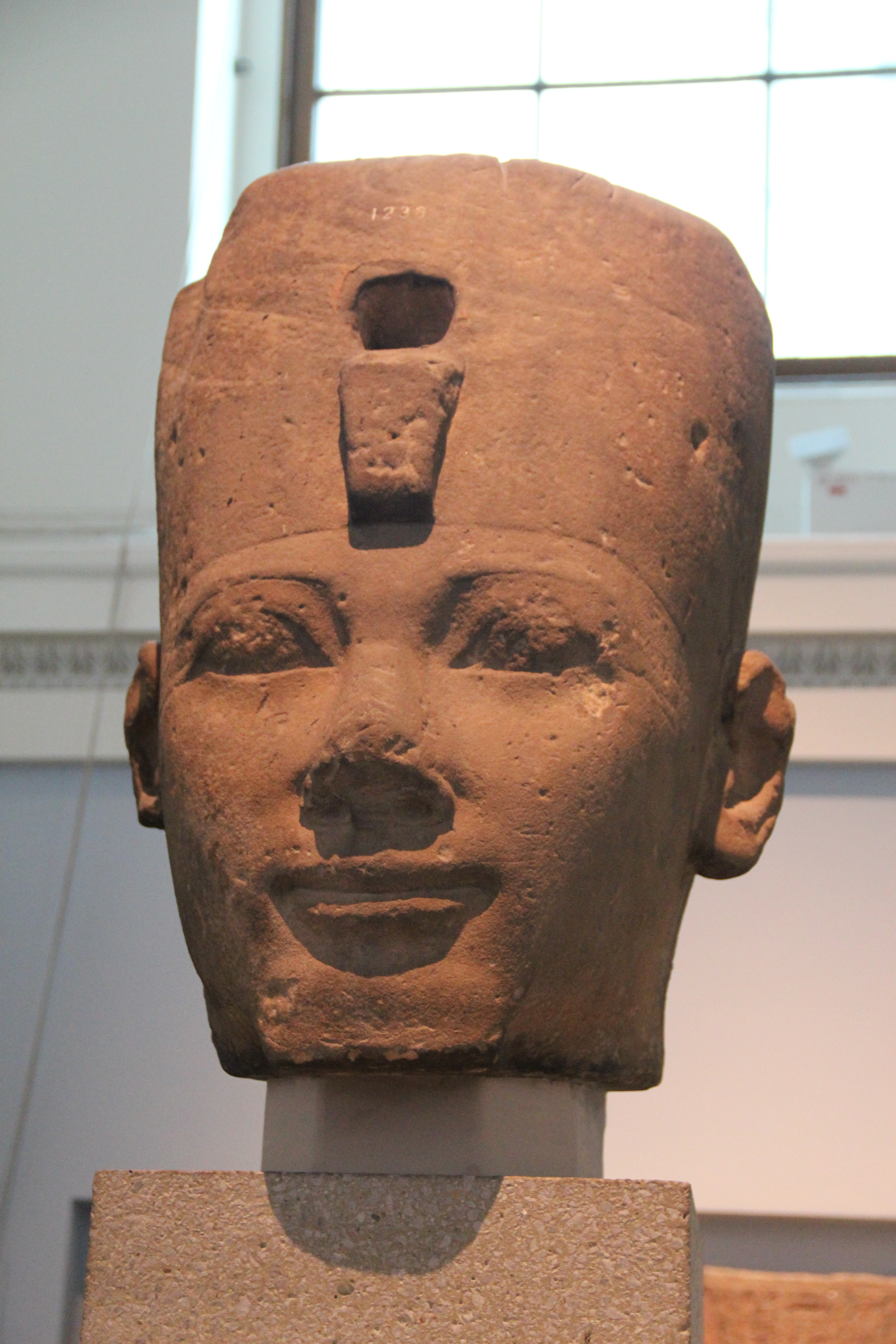
- A osiride stone head from Karnak, most likely depicting Thutmose I, on display at the British Museum

Pharaoh
- Reign: 10–12 regnal years: 1506–1493 BC (low chronology); 1526 BC to 1513 BC (high chronology); 1493–1483 BC (Cooney)
- Predecessor: Amenhotep I
- Successor: Thutmose II
Royal titulary
Horus name
Kanakht Meryma'at
K3-nḫt-mrj-m3ˁt
Strong bull, beloved of Maat
G5	E1 D40 U6 C10
Nebty name
Kha·em·neseret Aa·pehty
Ḫˁ-m-nsrt-ˁ3-pḥtj
He who appears with the uraeus, great of strength
G16	N28 D36 G17 N35 F20 D21 X1 I13 O29 F9 F9
Golden Horus
Nefer·renput S'ankh·ib·u
Nfr-rnpwt-s-ˁnḫ-jb.w
He whose years are perfect/beautiful, he who causes hearts to live
G8	F35 M4 M4 M4 S29 S34 F34 F34 F34
Prenomen
Aa·kheperkare
ˁ3-ḫpr-k3-Rˁ
Great is the manifestation of the Ka of Ra

M23 X1 L2 X1	N5 O29 L1 D28
Nomen
Djehutymes
Ḏḥwtj-msj(w)
Born of Thoth
G39 N5 Z1 < G26 F31 S29 >
Djehutymes Khamyre
Ḏḥwty-ms(jw)-ḫˁ-mj-rˁ
Born of Thoth, appearing like Ra
G39 N5 Z1 < G26 F31 O34 N28 W19 N5 >
- Consorts: Ahmose; Mutnofret
- Children: Thutmose II; Hatshepsut; Amenmose; Wadjmose; Nefrubity
- Father: Unknown
- Mother: Senseneb
- Died: 1493/1483 BC
- Burial: KV20 (original burial), later KV38; Mummy found in the Deir el-Bahri royal cache (Theban Necropolis) [disputed]
- Monuments: Pylons IV and V, two obelisks, and a hypostyle hall at Karnak
- Dynasty: 18th Dynasty

Thutmose I (also written as Thutmosis, Tuthmosis, or Thothmes in older history works of Latinized Greek; Ancient Egyptian: ḏḥwti.ms(.w): "Born of Thoth") was the third pharaoh of the 18th Dynasty of Egypt. He ascended to the throne after the death of the previous king, Amenhotep I. During his reign, he campaigned deep into the Levant and Nubia, pushing the borders of Egypt farther than ever before in each region, as Thutmose established the Euphrates as Egypt's northern border. He also built many temples in Egypt, and a tomb for himself in the Valley of the Kings; he is the first king confirmed to have done this (though Amenhotep I may have preceded him).

Thutmose I's reign is generally dated to 1506–1493 BC, but a minority of scholars—who think that astrological observations used to calculate the timeline of ancient Egyptian records, and thus the reign of Thutmose I, were taken from the city of Memphis rather than from Thebes—would date his reign to 1526–1513 BC. He was succeeded by his son Thutmose II, who in turn was succeeded by Thutmose II's sister, Hatshepsut.

== Family ==
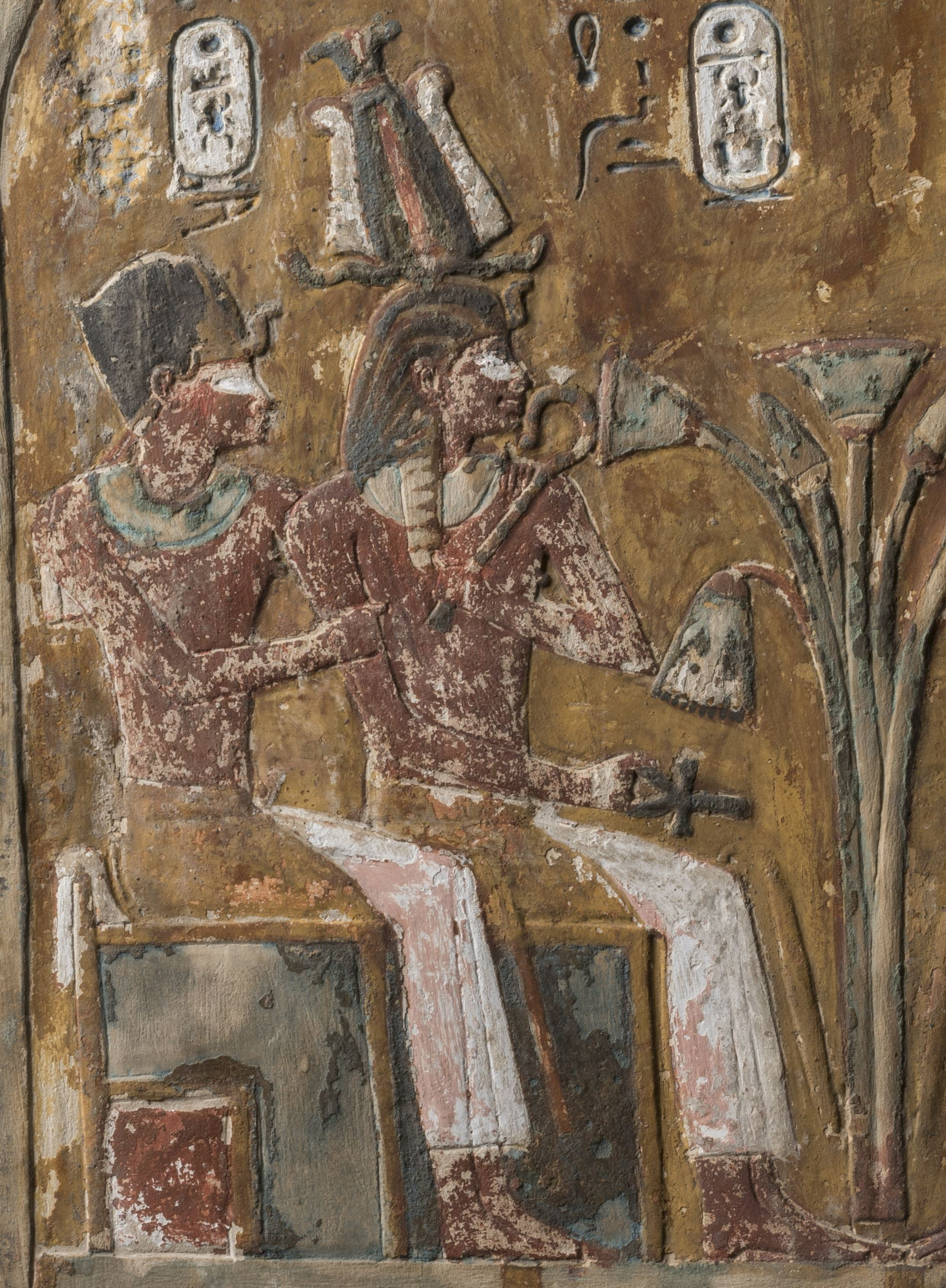
Thutmose I (right) and Thutmose II as depicted in the Stela on Sennefer

Thutmose never called himself "Son of the King", hence is believed to be born in non-royal family, to a woman named Senseneb and an unknown father.

Thutmose's wife, Queen Ahmose, who held the title of Great Royal Wife of Thutmose, was probably the daughter of Ahmose I and the sister of Amenhotep I; however, she was never called "king's daughter", so there is some doubt about this, and some historians believe she was Thutmose's sister.

There is speculation marriage was meant to elevate common-born Thutmose's position, but this is disputed because his first-born son, Amenmose, was apparently born long before Thutmose's coronation. He can be seen on a stela from Thutmose's fourth regnal year hunting near Memphis, and he became the "great army-commander of his father" sometime before his death, which was no later than Thutmose's own death in his 12th regnal year. However, it is unknown whether Amenmose was son of Ahmes and whether he was born before or after his father's ascension, and the title of commander might have been solely ceremonial as mean to mark the Prince as heir apparent.

Thutmose had two other sons—Wadjmose (by an unknown woman) and Thutmose (by Mutnofret, who was likely a daughter of Ahmose I and a sister of Amenhotep I)—and two daughters, Hatshepsut and Nefrubity, by Ahmose. Wadjmose and Nefrubity both died young.

His son by Mutnofret succeeded him as Thutmose II and married his half-sister Hatshepsut. It was later recorded by Hatshepsut that their father willed the kingship to both her husband and her, but this is considered propaganda made by Hatshepsut's supporters to legitimise her claim to the throne when she later assumed pharaonic power.

== Reign ==
=== Dates and length of reign ===
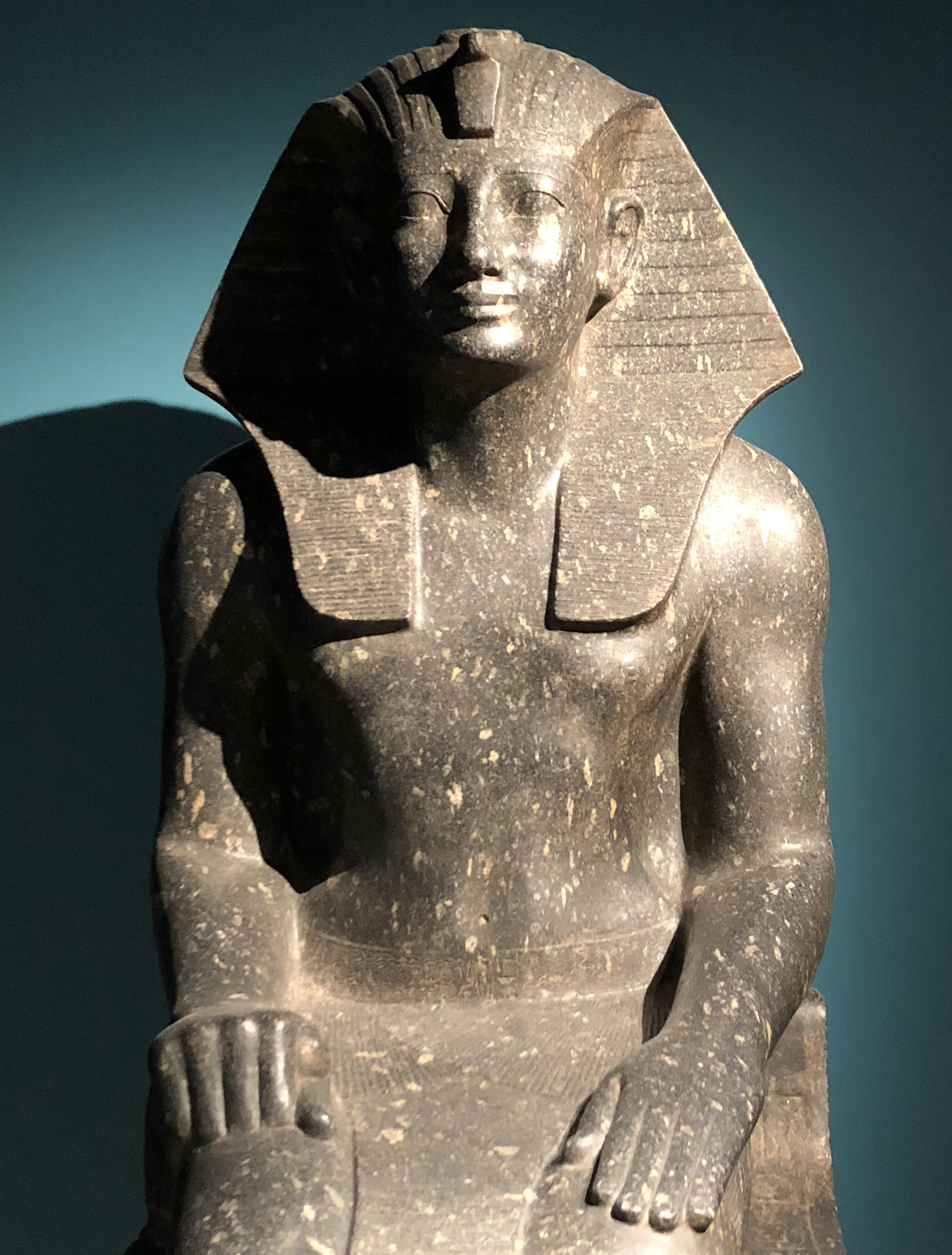
Pharonic statue of Senusret I that was recarved and reinscribed for Tuthmose I in the Museo Egizio

A heliacal rising of Sothis was recorded in the reign of Thutmose's predecessor, Amenhotep I, which has been dated to 1517 BC, assuming the observation was made at Thebes. The year of Amenhotep's death and Thutmose's subsequent coronation can be accordingly derived, and is dated to 1506 BC by most modern scholars. But if the observation were made at either Heliopolis or Memphis, as a minority of scholars argue, Thutmose would have been crowned in 1526 BC. A stela from Wadi Halfa gives Thutmose's accession date as III Peret 21. Manetho records that Thutmose I's reign lasted 12 years and 9 months (or 13 years) as a certain Mephres in his Epitome. This data is supported by two dated inscriptions from Years 8 and 9 of his reign bearing his cartouche found inscribed on a stone block in Karnak. Accordingly, Thutmose is usually given a reign from 1506 BC to 1493 BC (low chronology), but a minority of scholars date it from 1526 BC to 1513 BC (high chronology).

=== Military achievements ===
Upon Thutmose's coronation, Nubia rebelled against Egyptian rule. According to the tomb autobiography of Ahmose, son of Ebana, Thutmose traveled up the Nile and fought in the battle, personally killing the Nubian king. Upon victory, he had the Nubian king's body hung from the prow of his ship, before he returned to Thebes. After that campaign, he led a second expedition against Nubia in his third year in the course of which he ordered the canal at the first cataract—which had been built under Sesostris III of the 12th Dynasty—to be dredged in order to facilitate easier travel upstream from Egypt to Nubia. This helped integrate Nubia into the Egyptian empire. This expedition is mentioned in two separate inscriptions by the king's son Thure:

Year 3, first month of the third season, day 22, under the majesty of the King of Upper and Lower Egypt, Aakheperre who is given life. His Majesty commanded to dig this canal after he found it stopped up with stones [so that] no [ship sailed upon it]; Year 3, first month of the third season, day 22. His Majesty sailed this canal in victory and in the power of his return from overthrowing the wretched Kush.

In the second year of Thutmose's reign, the king cut a stele at Tombos, which records that he built a fortress at Tombos, near the third cataract, thus permanently extending the Egyptian military presence, which had previously stopped at Buhen, at the second cataract.

==== Campaign in the Levant and Syria ====
The conquest of Megiddo. The victory was commemorated in reliefs at Karnak depicting the conquered cities and their rulers as captives. Each city was shown as a bound figure with "arms bound behind the back", explicitly identified as Syrian. In accompanying scenes, Thutmose III is portrayed grasping "kneeling Asiatics" "by the hair" and "in the act of smiting with his mace", while deities present "the various Syrian towns in fetters" to the king, reinforcing the imagery of physical domination and submission.

The rulers were required to provide hostages and engage in dynastic submission, and "many a Syrian king's daughter was received into the harem of the pharaoh", reinforcing Egyptian control through elite incorporation and marriage politics. Textual sources from the time of Thutmose I include references to Retenu, Naharin, and the 'land of Mitanni'. The last is believed to be the first historical reference to that kingdom.

Many Levantine sites were destroyed in the middle of the 16th century BC, and these destructions have often been attributed to the military campaigns of Thutmose I, or of his predecessor Amenhotep I. Initially these campaigns may have aimed at defeating the power of the Hyksos, who were formerly strong in this area.

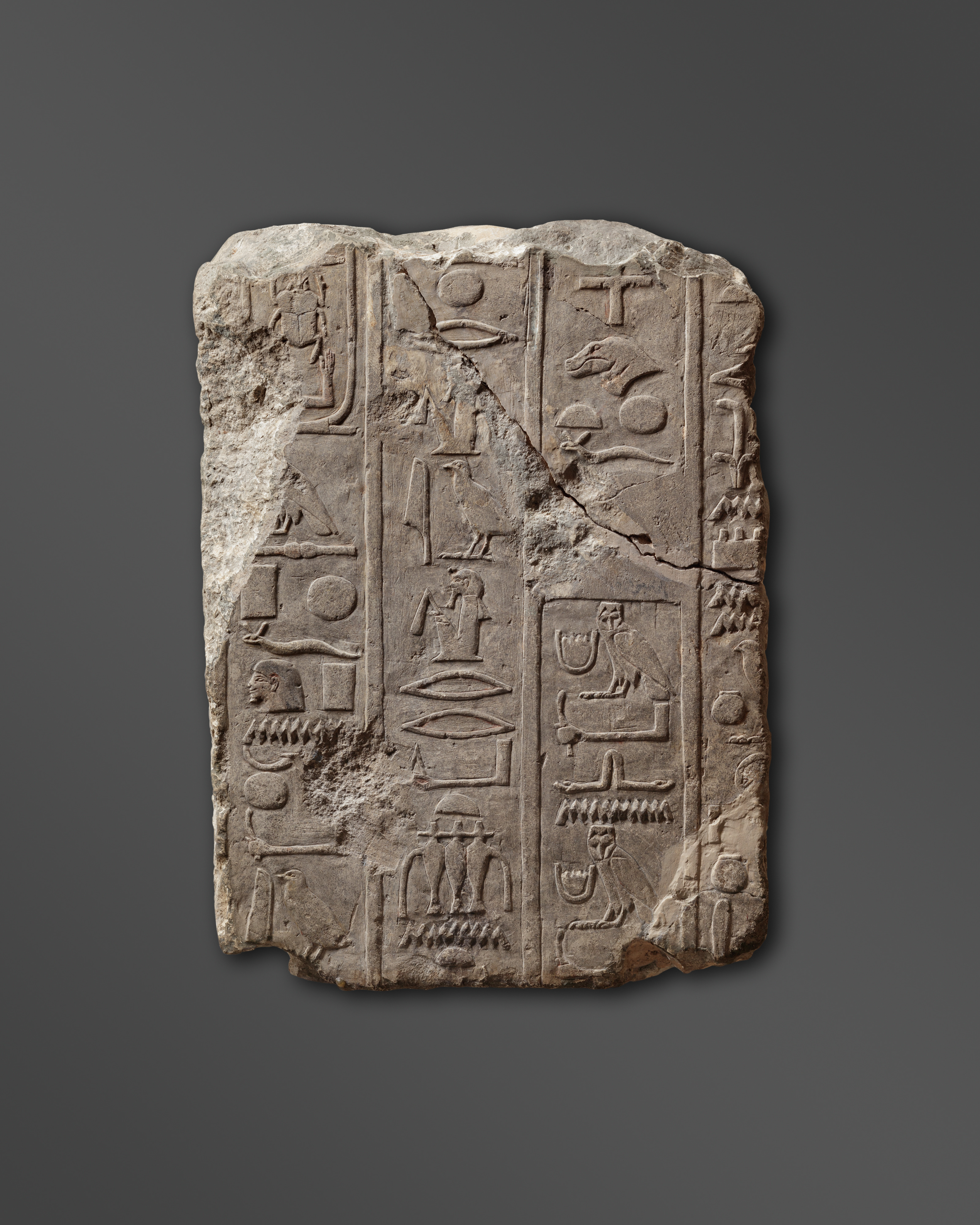
Account of a Campaign of Thutmose I

As many as 20 sites in the Levant suffered destruction at this time. For example, the fiery destruction of Stratum XVIII at Gezer has been assigned to the second half of the 16th century BC, the time of Amenhotep I and Thutmose I, based on the pottery and scarabs discovered in the destruction debris.

It does not appear that the Egyptians' aim at this stage was to control the area permanently, because they established no permanent presence in the area. This happened later, during the 18th dynasty.

==== Rebellions in the south ====
Thutmose had to face one more military threat, another rebellion by Nubia in his fourth year. His influence accordingly expanded even farther south, as an inscription dated to his reign has been found as far south as Kurgus, south of the fourth cataract. He inscribed a large tableau on the Hagar el-Merwa, a quartz outcrop c. 40 m (130 ft) long and 50 m (160 ft) wide 1200 meters from the Nile, on top of several local inscriptions. This is the furthest south the Egyptian presence is attested. During his reign, he initiated a number of projects that effectively ended Nubian independence for 500 years. He enlarged a temple to Sesostris III and Khnum, opposite the Nile from Semna. There are also records of specific religious rites the viceroy of El-Kab was to have performed in the temples in Nubia in proxy for the king. He also appointed a man called Turi to the position of viceroy of Kush, also known as the "King's Son of Cush". With a civilian representative of the king permanently established in Nubia, Nubia did not dare revolt as often as it had and was easily controlled by future Egyptian kings.

==== Legacy ====
His achievements could be summarized in the words he said about himself:I established the borders of Egypt to what the sun revolves around. I let Egypt be chief, every land being its subject.

=== Building projects ===
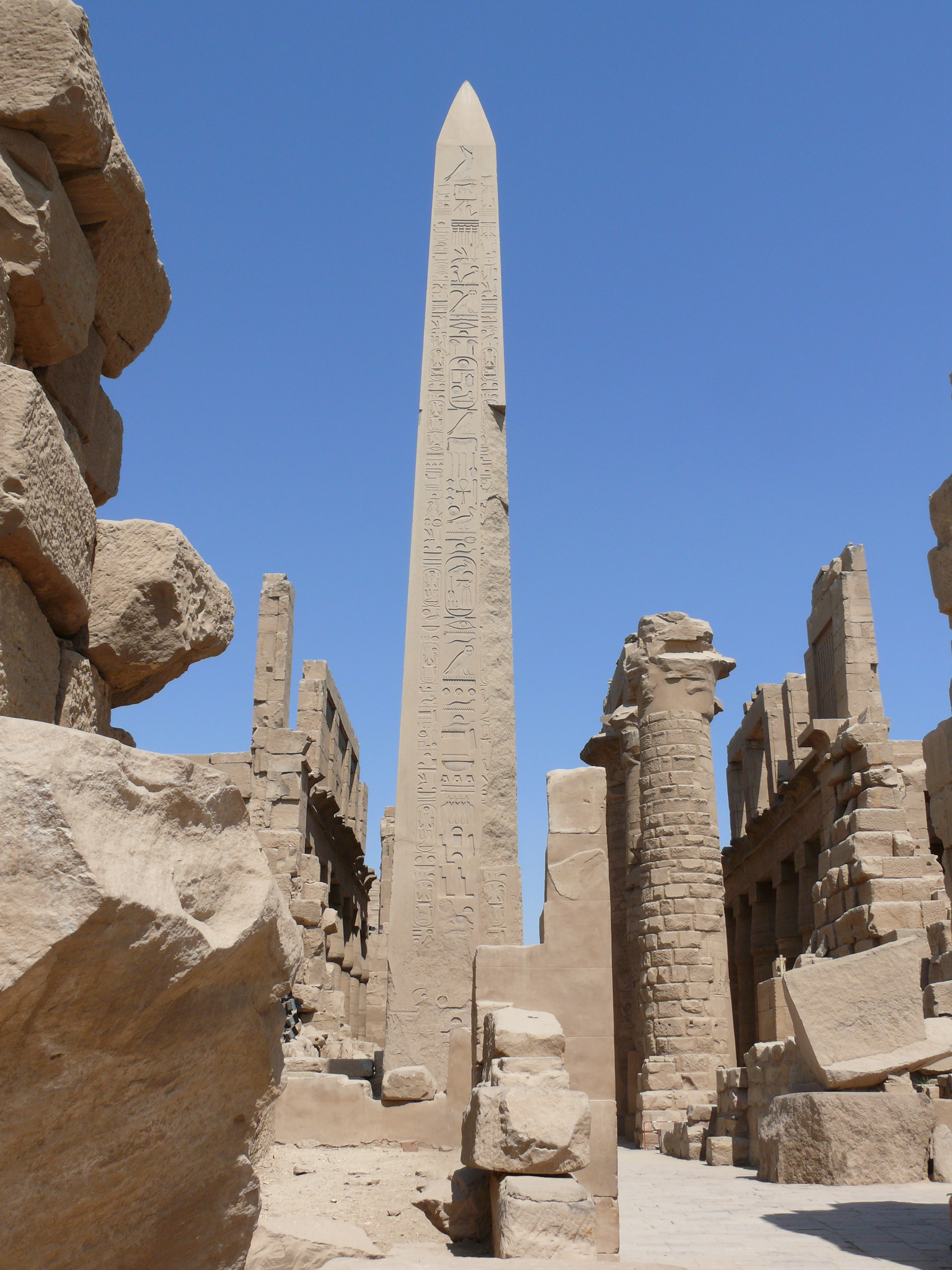
Court of the 4th pylon: obelisk of Thutmose I at Karnak

Thutmose I organized great building projects during his reign, including many temples and tombs, but his greatest projects were at the Temple of Karnak under the supervision of the architect Ineni. Before Thutmose, Karnak probably consisted only of a long road to a central platform, with a number of shrines for the solar bark along the side of the road. Thutmose was the first king to drastically enlarge the temple. He had the fifth pylon built along the temple's main road, along with a wall around the inner sanctuary and two flagpoles to flank the gateway. Outside of this, he built a fourth pylon and another enclosure wall. Between pylons four and five, he had a hypostyle hall constructed, with columns made of cedar wood. This type of structure was common in ancient Egyptian temples, and supposedly represents a papyrus marsh, an Egyptian symbol of creation. Along the edge of this room he built colossal statues, each one alternating wearing the crown of Upper Egypt and the crown of Lower Egypt. Finally, outside of the fourth pylon, he erected four more flagpoles and two obelisks, although one of them, which now has fallen, was not inscribed until Thutmose III inscribed it about 50 years later. The cedar columns in Thutmose I's hypostyle hall were replaced with stone columns by Thutmose III, but at least the northernmost two were replaced by Thutmose I himself. Hatshepsut also erected two of her own obelisks inside Thutmose I's hypostyle hall.

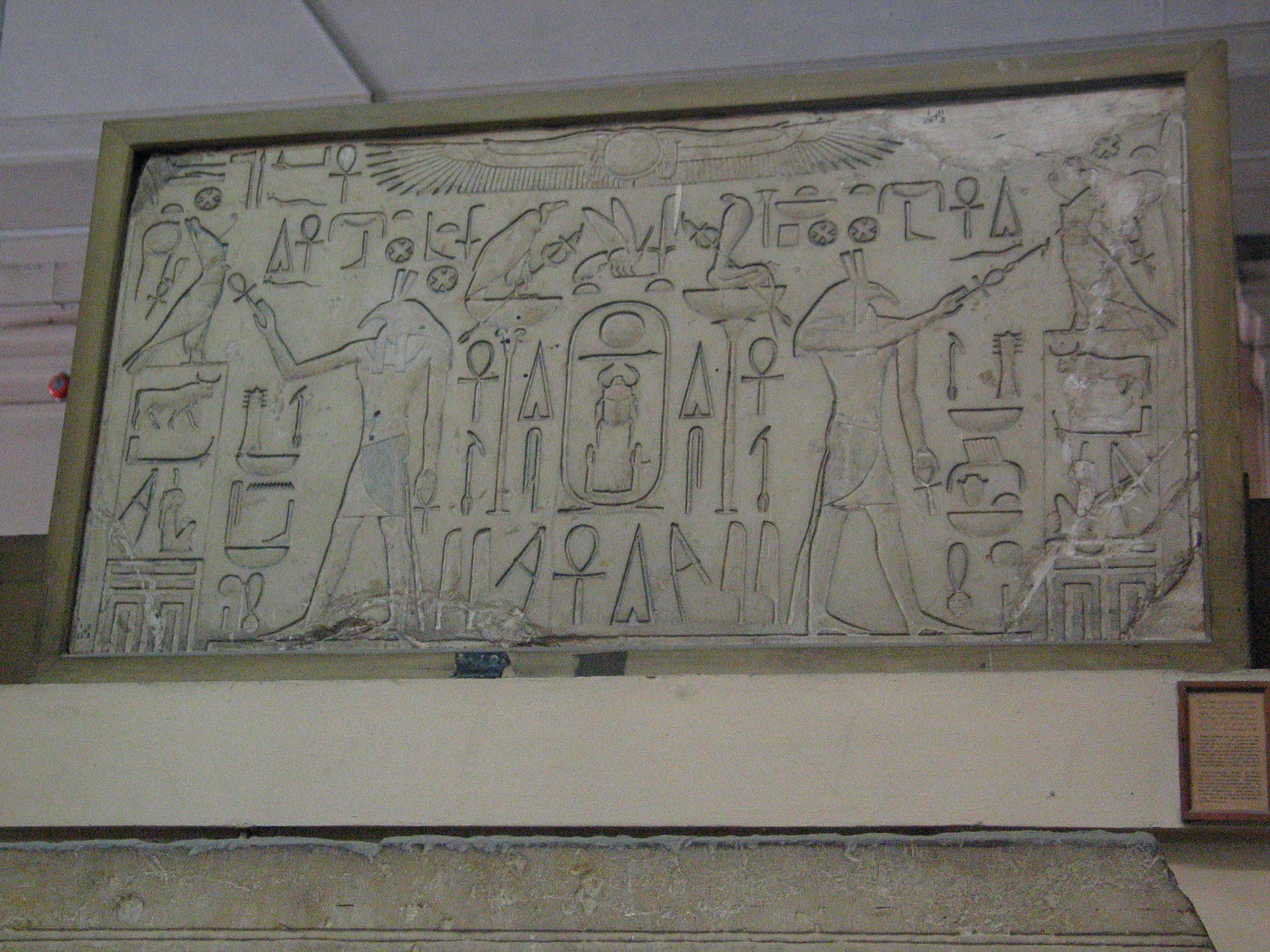
Stela of Thutmose I in the Cairo Museum

In addition to Karnak, Thutmose I also built statues of the Ennead at Abydos, buildings at Armant, Ombos, el-Hiba, Memphis, and Edfu, as well as minor expansions to buildings in Nubia, at Semna, Buhen, Aniba, and Quban.

Thutmose I was the first king who definitely was buried in the Valley of the Kings. Ineni was commissioned to dig this tomb, and presumably to build his mortuary temple. His mortuary temple has not been found, possibly because it was incorporated into or demolished by the construction of Hatshepsut's mortuary temple at Deir el-Bahri. His tomb, however, has been identified as KV38. In it was found a yellow quartzite sarcophagus bearing the name of Thutmose I, but Thutmose III may have moved his body into the tomb of Hatshepsut, KV20, which also contains a sarcophagus with the name of Thutmose I on it.

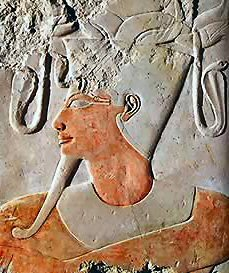
Thutmose the First painted

== Death ==
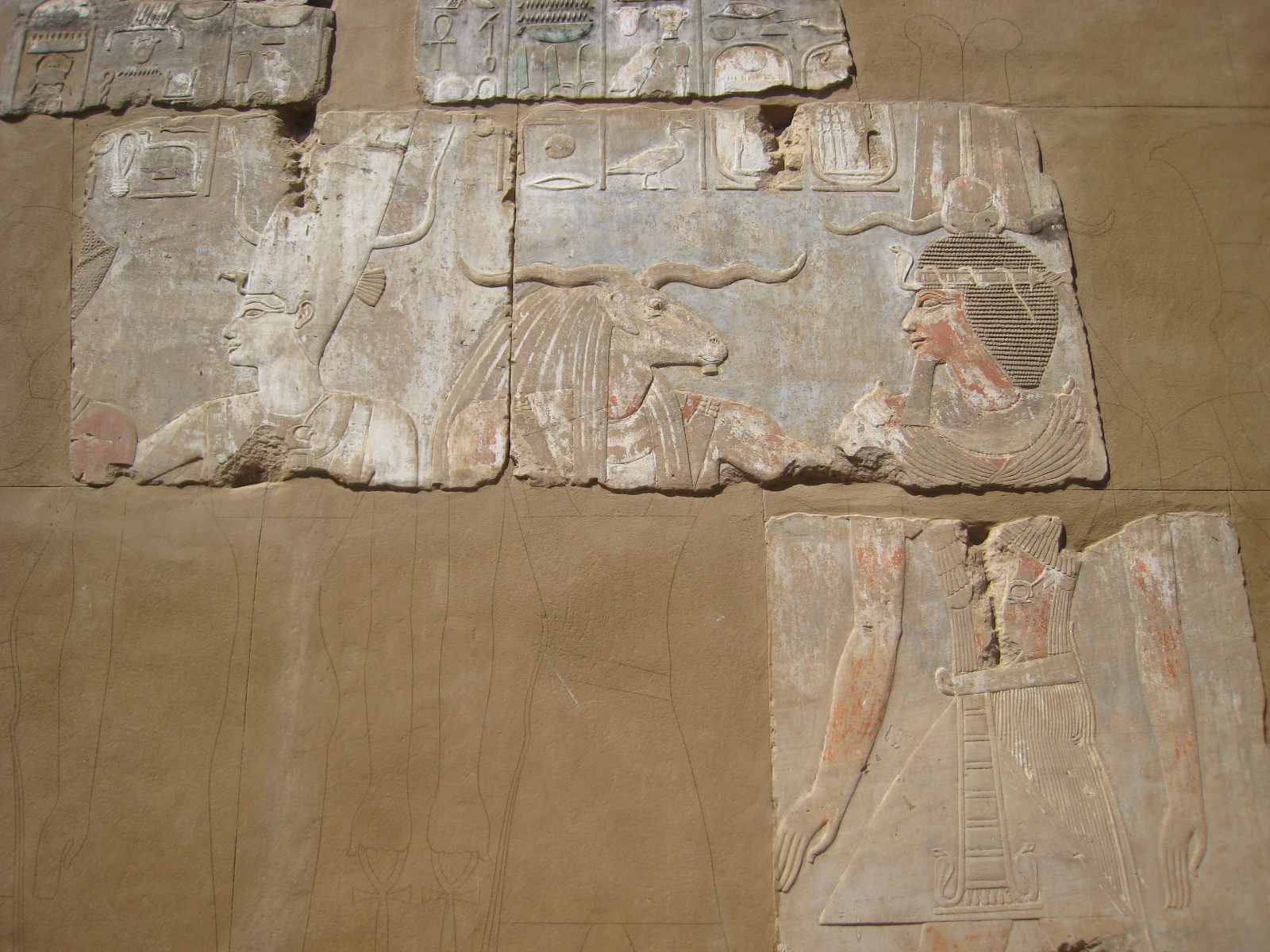
Thutmose I and Khnum in Elephantine Island

=== Burial ===
Thutmose I was originally buried and then reburied in KV20 in a double burial with his daughter Hatshepsut rather than KV38, which could only have been built for Thutmose I during the reign of his grandson Thutmose III based on "a recent re-examination of the architecture and contents of KV38". The location of KV20, if not its original owner, had been known since the Napoleonic expedition of 1799 and, in 1844, the Prussian scholar Karl Richard Lepsius had partially explored its upper passage, but all its passageways "had become blocked by a solidified mass of rubble, small stones and rubbish which had been carried into the tomb by floodwaters" and only during the 1903–04 excavation season did Howard Carter, after two previous seasons of strenuous work, clear its corridors and enter its double burial chamber. Here, among the debris of broken pottery and shattered stone vessels from the burial chamber and lower passages, were the remnants of two vases made for Queen Ahmose Nefertari, which formed part of Thutmose I's original funerary equipment; one of the vases contained a secondary inscription that says that Thutmose II made it "as his monument to his father". Other vessels that bore Thutmose I's names and titles had also been inscribed by his son and successor, Thutmose II, along with fragments of stone vessels made for Hatshepsut before she herself became king as well as other vessels that bore her royal name of 'Maatkare', which would have been made only after she took the throne.

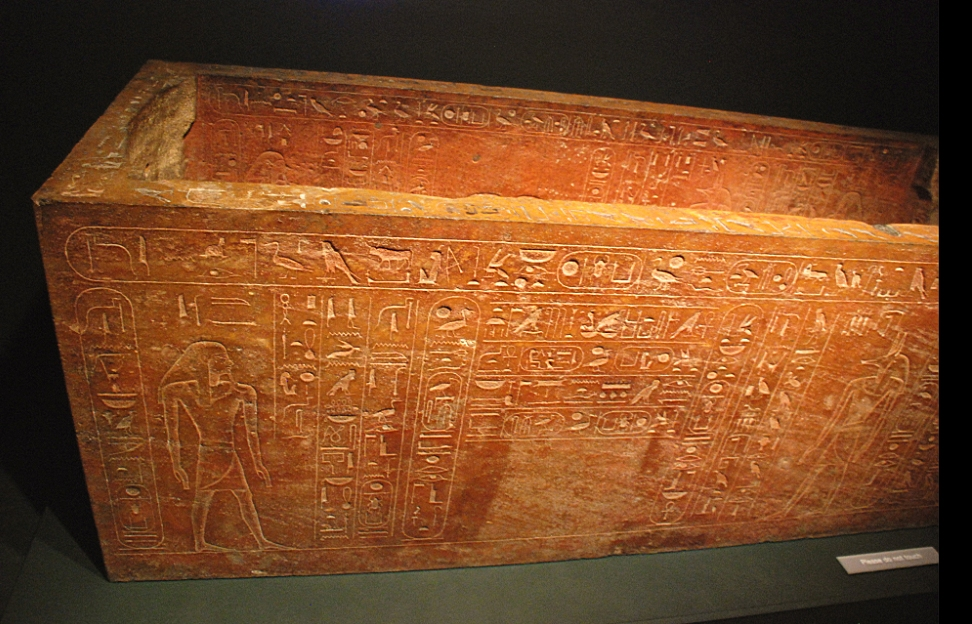
Hatshepsut donated this quartzite sarcophagus which was made in her reign for the reburial of her father, Thutmose I, in KV20 (Museum of Fine Arts, Boston)

But Carter also discovered two separate coffins in the burial chamber. Hatshepsut's beautifully carved sarcophagus "was discovered open with no sign of a body, and with the lid lying discarded on the floor"; it is now housed in the Cairo Museum along with a matching yellow quartzite canopic chest. A second sarcophagus was found lying on its side with its almost undamaged lid propped against the wall nearby; it was eventually presented to Theodore M. Davis, the excavation's financial sponsor, as a gesture of appreciation for his support. Davis in turn presented it to the Museum of Fine Arts, Boston. The second quartzite sarcophagus had originally been engraved with the name of "the King of Upper and Lower Egypt, Maatkare Hatshepsut", but when it was complete, Hatshepsut decided to commission an entirely new sarcophagus for herself and donated the existing finished sarcophagus to her father, Thutmose I. The stonemasons then attempted to erase the original carvings by restoring the surface of the quartzite so that it could be re-carved with the name and titles of Tuthmose I instead. This quartzite sarcophagus measures 7 feet (2.1 m) long by 3 feet (0.91 m) wide with walls 5 inches (13 cm) thick and bears a dedication text that records Hatshepsut's generosity towards her father:

...long live the Female Horus...The king of Upper and Lower Egypt, Maatkare, the son of Re, Hatshepsut-Khnemet-Amun! May she live forever! She made it as her monument to her father whom she loved, the Good God, Lord of the Two Lands, Aakheperkare, the son of Re, Thutmosis the justified.

Thutmose I was not destined to lie alongside his daughter after Hatshepsut's death. Thutmose III, Hatshepsut's successor, decided to reinter his grandfather in an even more magnificent tomb, KV38, featuring another yellow sarcophagus dedicated to Thutmose I and inscribed with texts that proclaim this pharaoh's love for his deceased grandfather. Thutmose I's remains were disturbed late during the 20th dynasty when KV38 was plundered; the sarcophagus's lid was broken and all this king's valuable precious jewelry and grave goods were stolen.

=== Mummy ===
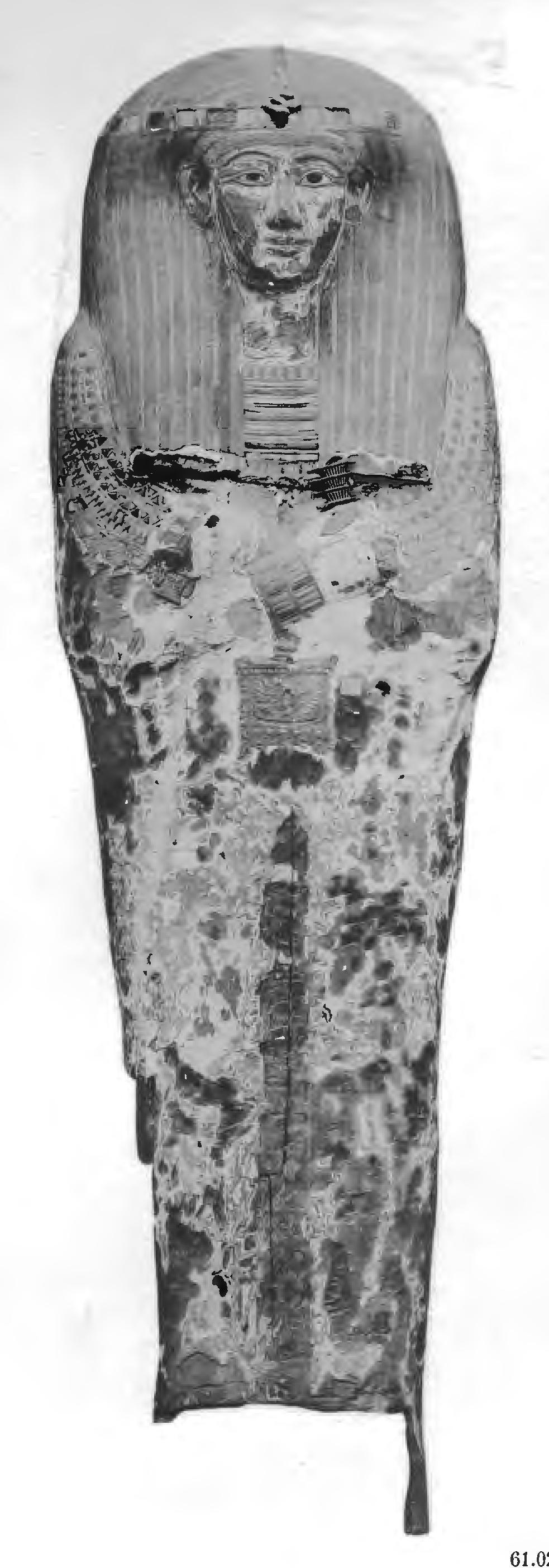
Coffin of Thutmose I, reused by Pinedjem I

Thutmose I's mummy was discovered in the Deir el-Bahri Cache above the Mortuary Temple of Hatshepsut, revealed in 1881. It had been interred along with those of the 18th- and 19th-dynasty leaders Ahmose I, Amenhotep I, Thutmose II, Thutmose III, Ramesses I, Seti I, Ramesses II, and Ramesses IX, as well as the 21st-dynasty pharaohs Pinedjem I, Pinedjem II, and Siamun.

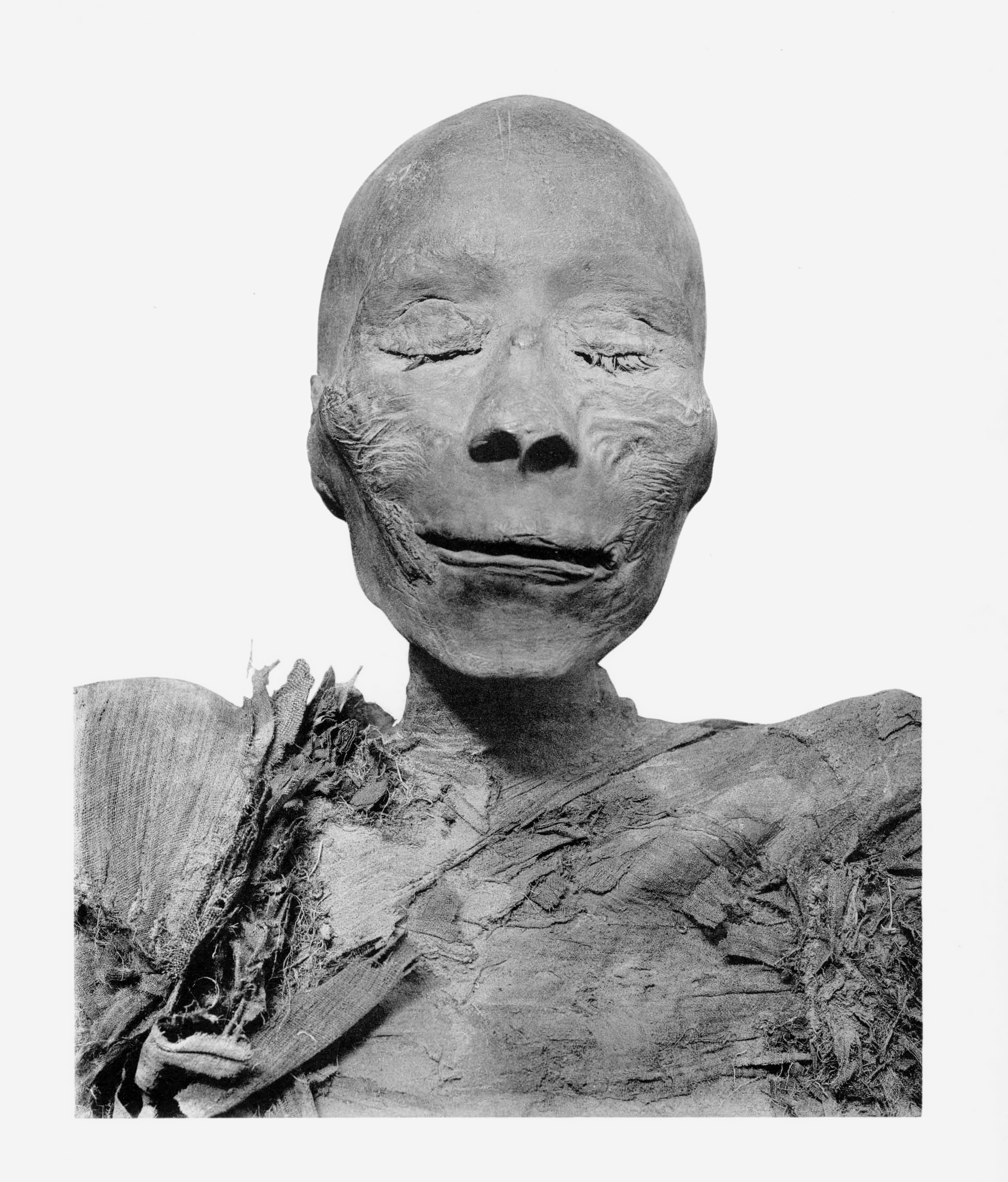
Previously thought to be the mummy of Thutmose I. Mislabeled Thutmose I in the 21st Dynasty move of royal mummies into caches, the identity of this individual is now unknown.

Thutmose I's original coffin was taken over and reused by pharaoh Pinedjem I of the 21st dynasty. The mummy of Thutmose I was thought to be lost, but Egyptologist Gaston Maspero, largely on the strength of familial resemblance to the mummies of Thutmose II and Thutmose III, believed he had found his mummy in the otherwise unlabelled mummy #5283. This identification has been supported by subsequent examinations, revealing that the embalming techniques used came from the appropriate period of time, almost certainly after that of Ahmose I and made during the 18th dynasty.

Gaston Maspero described the mummy as follows:

The king was already advanced in age at the time of his death, being over fifty years old, to judge by the incisor teeth, which are worn and corroded by the impurities of which the Egyptian bread was full. The body, though small and emaciated, shows evidence of unusual muscular strength; the head is bald, the features are refined, and the mouth still bears an expression characteristic of shrewdness and cunning.

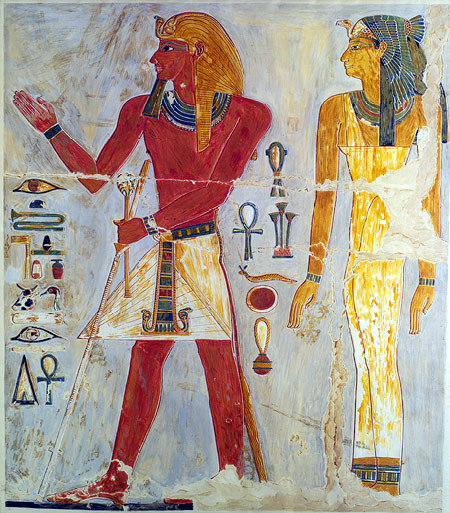
Thutmose I, copy of relief, Deir el-Bahari

James Harris and Fawzia Hussien (1991) conducted an X-ray survey on New Kingdom royal mummies and examined Thutmose I's mummified remains. The study found that Thutmose I's mummy had all the craniofacial characteristics common among Nubian populations and a "typical Nubian morphology".

A 2020 genetic study performed by a team under Zahi Hawass on the Amarna royal mummies also featured the unidentified royal mummy previously thought to be Thutmose I in the control samples. The study indicated that the mummy belonged to haplogroup L, which is mainly observed in southern, western and central Asia (highest in the Indian subcontinent).

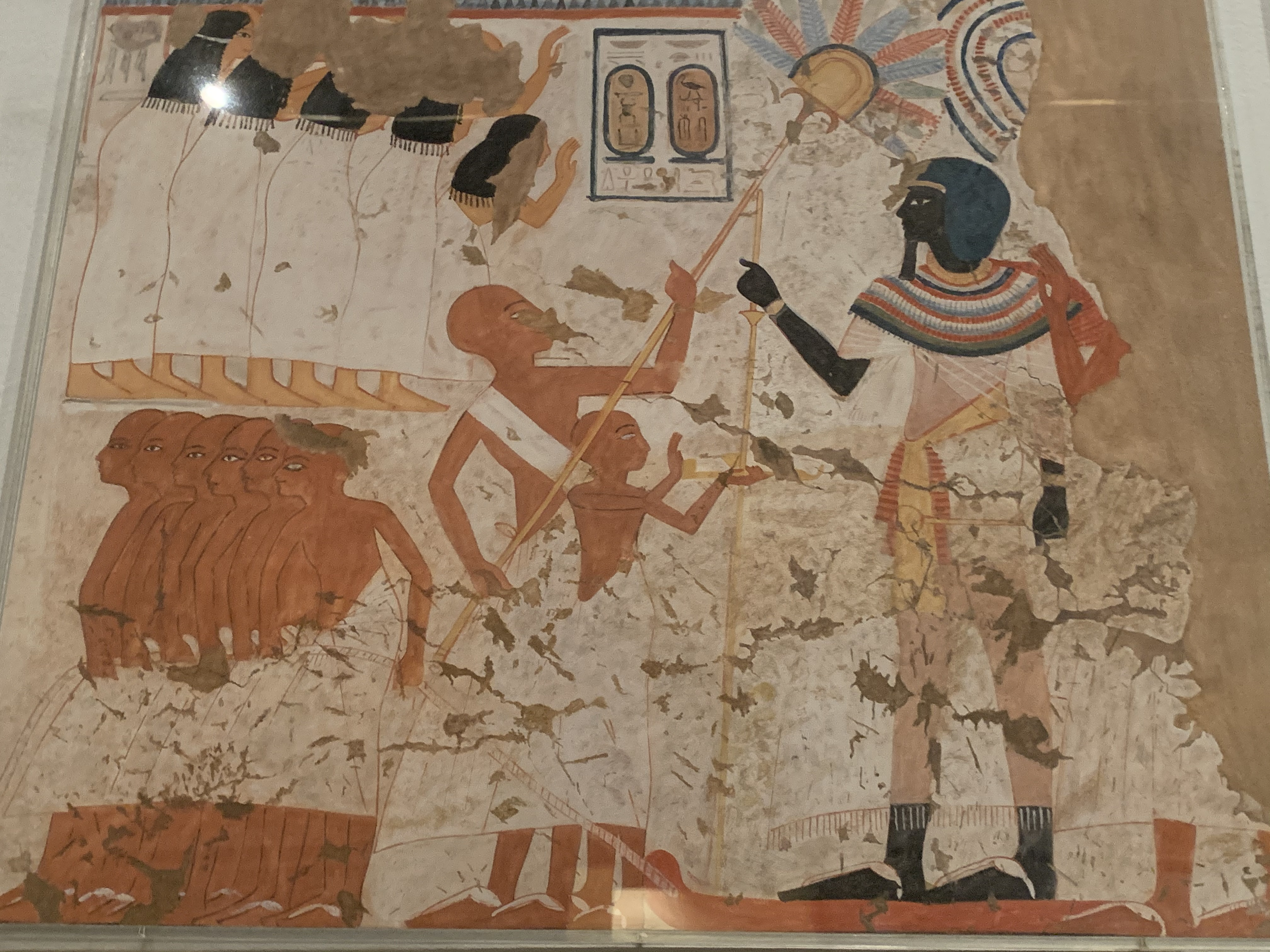
Scene of a statue of Thutmose I. He is depicted in the symbolic black color of deification, the black color also symbolizes rebirth and regeneration; MET Museum, NYC. The statue is being dragged, showing a deified depiction of the king in the symbolic black color of deification, c. 1294–1279 BC, more than two centuries after his death, with offerings and rites honoring him.

What was thought to be his mummy could be viewed in the Egyptian Museum in Cairo. But in 2007, Hawass announced that the mummy previously thought to be Thutmose I is that of a 30-year-old man who died as a result of an arrow wound to the chest. Because of the young age of the mummy and the cause of death, it was determined that the mummy was probably not that of Thutmose I. The mummy has the inventory number CG 61065. In April 2021, the mummy was moved to the National Museum of Egyptian Civilization along with those of 17 kings and four queens in an event termed the Pharaohs' Golden Parade.

== See also ==
- History of Ancient Egypt
- Eighteenth dynasty of Egypt Family Tree

== Bibliography ==
- Jürgen von Beckerath (1997). Chronologie des Pharaonischen Ägypten. Verlag Philipp von Zabern.
- Bleiberg, Edward (2001). "Thutmose I," The Oxford Encyclopedia of Ancient Egypt. Ed. Donald Redford. Vol. 3. Oxford University Press.
- Breasted, James Henry (1906). Ancient Records of Egypt, Vol. II. University of Chicago Press, Chicago.
- Erman, Adolf (1894). Life in Ancient Egypt. Macmilian and Company, London.
- Gardiner, Alan (1964). Egypt of the Pharaohs. Oxford University Press.
- Grimal, Nicolas (1988). A History of Ancient Egypt. Librairie Arthéme Fayard.
- Helk, Wolfgang (1983). Schwachstellen der Chronologie-Diskussion. Göttinger Miszellen, Göttingen.
- Maspero, Gaston. History Of Egypt, Chaldaea, Syria, Babylonia, and Assyria, Volume 4 (of 12), Project Gutenberg EBook, Release Date: December 16, 2005. EBook #17324.
- Shaw, Ian & Nicholson, Paul (1995). The Dictionary of Ancient Egypt. The British Museum Press.
- Shaw, Ian (2003). Exploring Ancient Egypt. Oxford University Press. ISBN 978-0-19-511678-6.
- Smith, G Elliot (2000). The Royal Mummies (reprint). Duckworth.

- When Egypt Ruled the Est George Steindorff and Keith C. Seele, 1942, University of Chicago Press (Scanned version, University of Chicago website)
