= KV38 =

Tomb for reburial of Pharaoh Thutmose I

- Burial site of Thutmose I
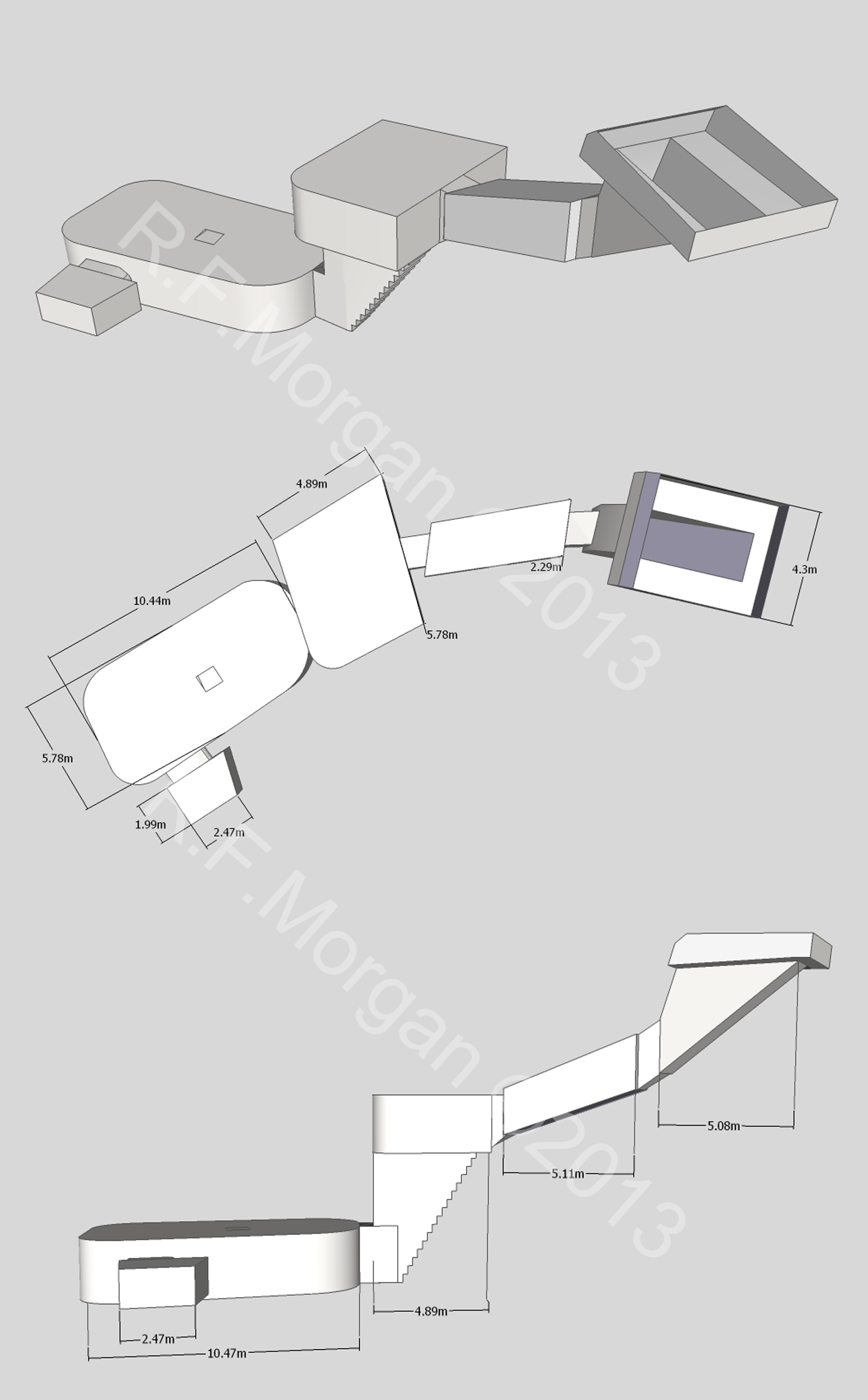
- Schematic for KV38

- Location within Egypt
- Coordinates: 25°44′19.9″N 32°35′59.1″E
- Location: East Valley of the Kings
- Discovered: March 1899
- Excavated by: Victor Loret (1899); Howard Carter (1919)
- Layout: Bent-axis
- ← Previous; KV37 Next → KV39

KV38 is an ancient Egyptian tomb located in the Valley of the Kings in Egypt. It was used for the reburial of Pharaoh Thutmose I of the Eighteenth Dynasty, and was where his body was removed to (from KV20) by Thutmose III before ultimately being relocated to the Royal Cache, located in Deir el-Bahri, during the Third Intermediate Period of Egypt.

Sjef Willockx has proposed that KV38 was original built by Hatshepsut as the tomb for a young Thutmose III in the case that the boy-king Thutmose III would not live to see adulthood. Later, after he reach adulthood, Willockx proposed that instead of extending the tomb to accommodate his adult burial, Thutmose III choose to carve a new tomb, KV34 for himself while the old tomb, KV38, was expanded to accommodate the reburial of his grandfather Thutmose I.

On fragments of the background of the burial chamber, it was discovered that the tomb also contained portions of the Amduat, a funerary text commonly found in royal tombs of the period intended to guide deceased royalty through the afterlife.
