= Amenhotep (high steward) =

Amenhotep was an ancient Egyptian high steward in office during the reign of Queen Hatshepsut. He is mainly known from his tomb and from a series of rock-cut inscriptions in the Aswan region.

From both sources it is clear that he was responsible for the erection of two obelisks of the queen in Karnak in the 16th year of her reign. The obelisks are depicted in his Theban tomb chapel (TT73). Related to this work he bears the title overseer of the work of the two big obelisks in the temple of Amun. In the rock-cut inscriptions in the Aswan region (where the stone for the obelisks was quarried), he appears also with the titles of a high priest of the local deities Khnum, Satis and Anuket.
