= TT81 =

Ancient Egyptian tomb

Coordinates: 25°43′57″N 32°36′26″E

Theban tomb TT81
- Burial site of Ineni
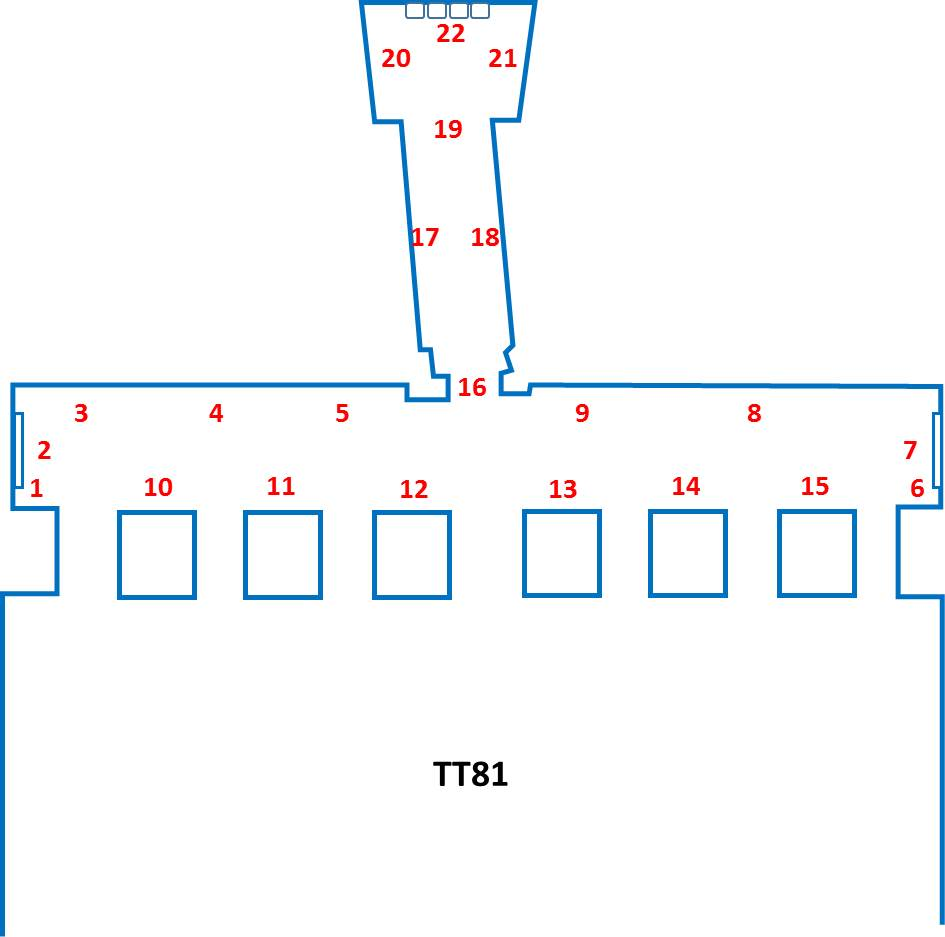

- Location within Egypt
- Location: Sheikh Abd el-Qurna, Theban Necropolis
- ← Previous; TT80 Next → TT82

i A2 n n i
Ineni
in hieroglyphs
Era: New Kingdom
(1550–1069 BC)

The Theban Tomb TT81 is located in Sheikh Abd el-Qurna, part of the Theban Necropolis, on the west bank of the Nile, opposite to Luxor. It is the burial place of the ancient Egyptian official Ineni and his family.

== Family ==
Ineni is depicted in the tomb with his father who is also called Ineni and his mother Sitdjehuty. Ineni's wife is named Ahhotep and nicknamed Thuiu. A brother named Pahery in an inscription in the passage to the shrine. The shrine contains four statues depicting Ineni, his wife and his parents.

== Description ==
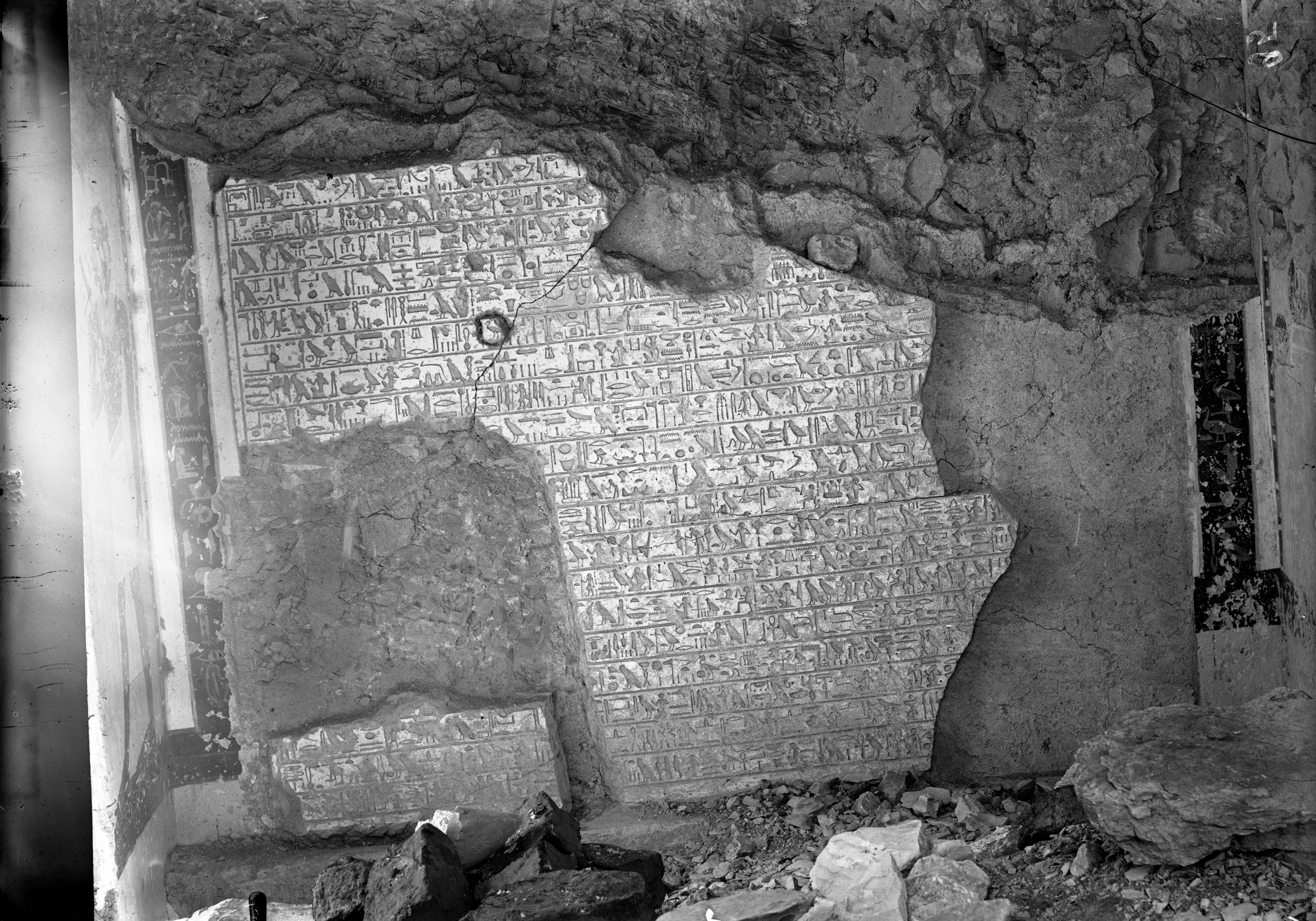
Interior of tomb TT81. Wall with inscription. Excavation photo, 1905-1914. Archivio fotografico Museo Egizio, Turin.

=== Layout ===
The tomb consists of a gallery cut into the rock, the roof of which is supported by six square pillars. From this gallery leads a chamber, at the end of which is a shrine which contains a group of four statues.

=== Decoration ===
The tomb of Ineni as part of an earlier group of tombs from the time of Tuthmosis III, which were decorated using a blue background color. This may be an imitation of nearby color schemes of tombs from the Middle Kingdom. The tomb is known to contain an inscription relating to the role of Hatshepsut as a regent in relation to her step-son Tuthmosis III. The inscription mentions how king Tuthmosis II had gone "forth to heaven, having mingled with the gods." His son Tuthmosis III is then said to have "stood in his place as King of the Two Lands, while Hatshepsut "settled the affairs of the Two Lands".

The tomb retains some of its decoration. The rear of the pillars show a variety of scenes:

- The southernmost pillar of which has hunting scenes, in which Ineni was depicted running (his figure has been largely destroyed) with a bow, hunting with dogs and catching a female Hyena.
- The next column shows Ineni in an orchard and garden.
- The third column shows Ineni seated before offerings, including baskets of grapes, bread, meat, vases of wine, etc.
- The fourth pillar shows similar scenes but the decoration is largely destroyed.
- The fifth pillar show Ineni in fields, sowing and plowing and pulling an ax.
- The sixth and final pillar on the north shows the harvest. Grain is heaped, oxen are threshing the grain, and corn is carried off the field.

The gallery further shows Ineni with his staff and contains two stela with an autobiographical text. Ineni is shown with his attendants doing inspections. One scene shows the weighing of the treasure of Amun and records a list of temples. In another scene Ineni is again shown doing inspections. Scenes include the transportation of produce to the temple of Amun. Ineni is depicted with his wife while fishing and fowling, the scenes show hippopotamus, birds and fish.

The passage to the inner chamber depicts Ineni before the gods and records rites that were performed before the statues of Ineni. Ineni's brother Pahery is shown offering to Ineni and his wife. Other scene sinclude a pilgrimage to Abydos, a sarcophagus being dragged by oxen and a funeral procession.

The inner chamber is decorated with scenes of Ineni and his family receiving offerings. The chamber ends with a group of four statues, depicting Ineni, his wife Thuau, his father, also called Ineni, and his mother.

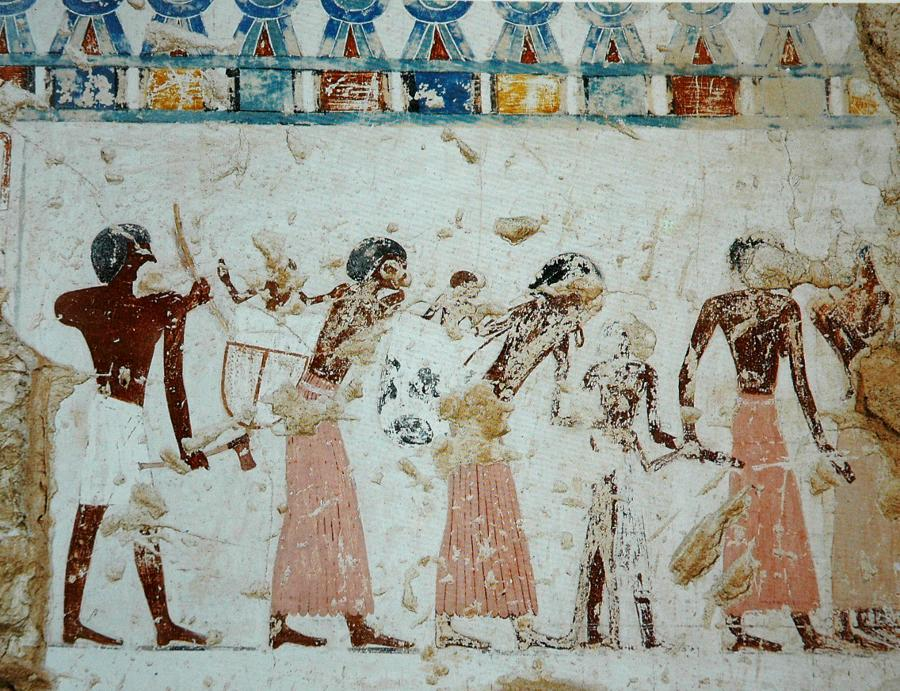
A scene from TT81

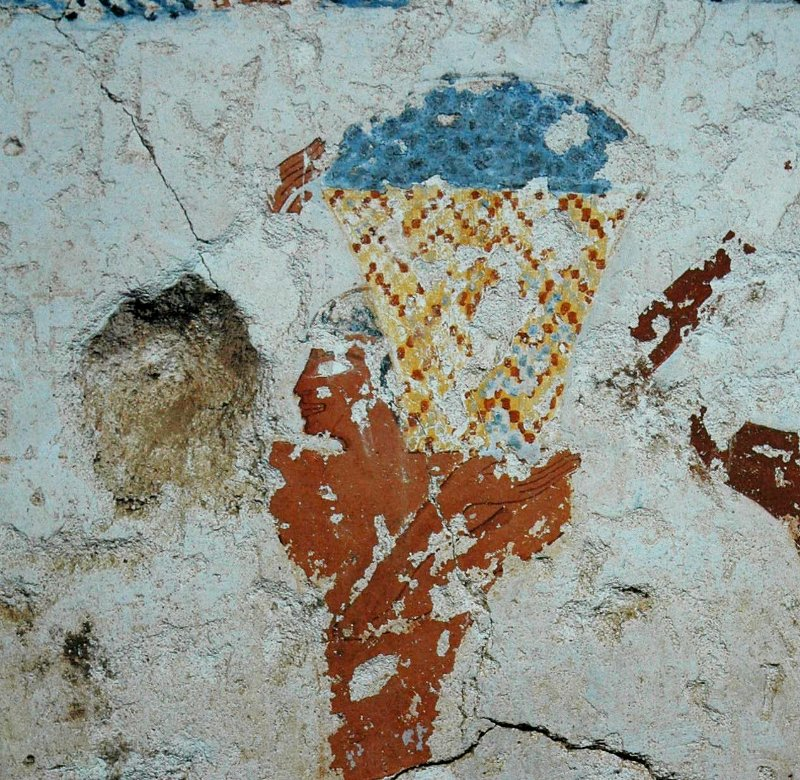
A painting from TT81 depicting a man carrying a basket of grapes

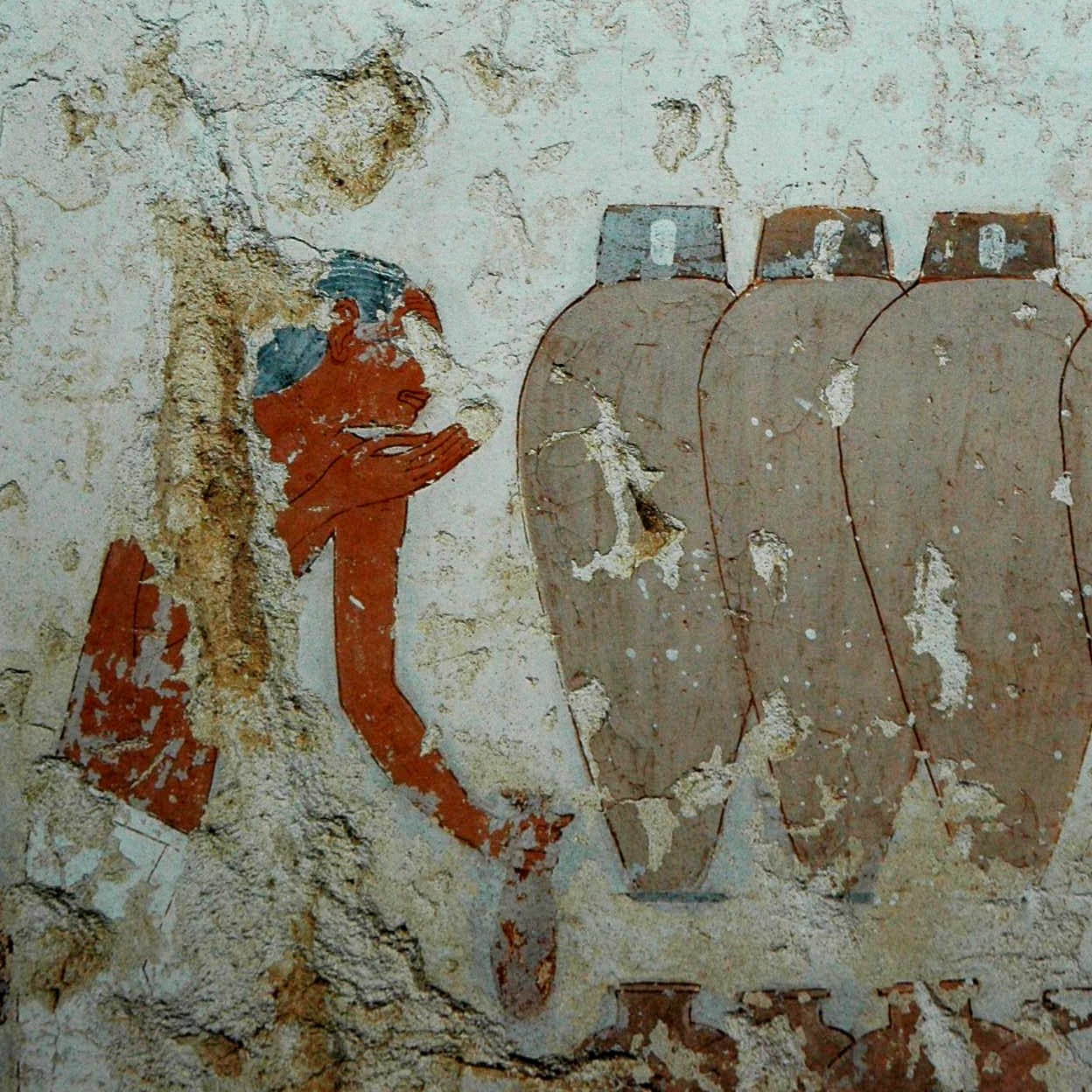
A painting from TT81 depicting a man standing before several amphorae of wine

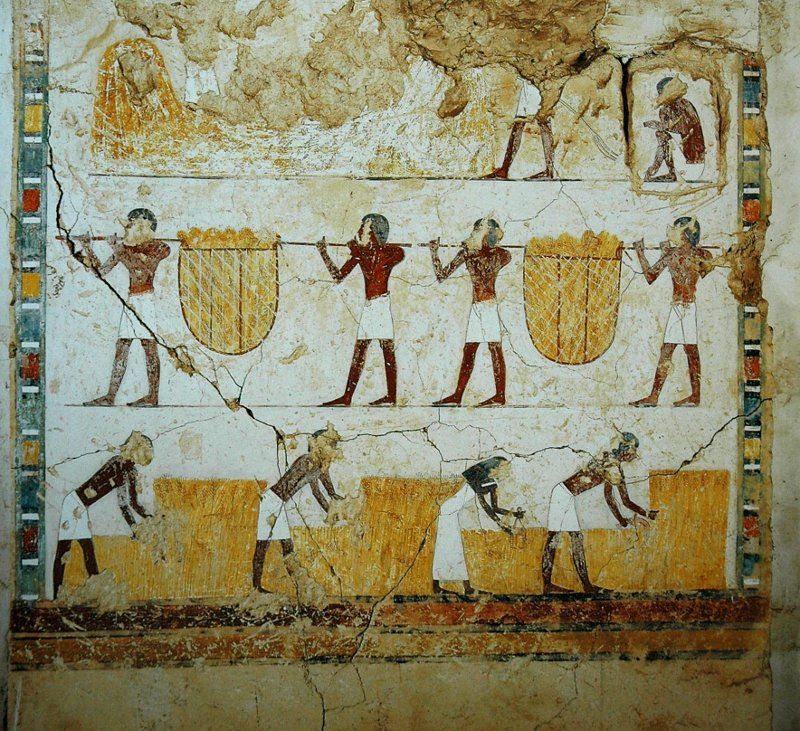
A painting from TT81 depicting the farming of grain

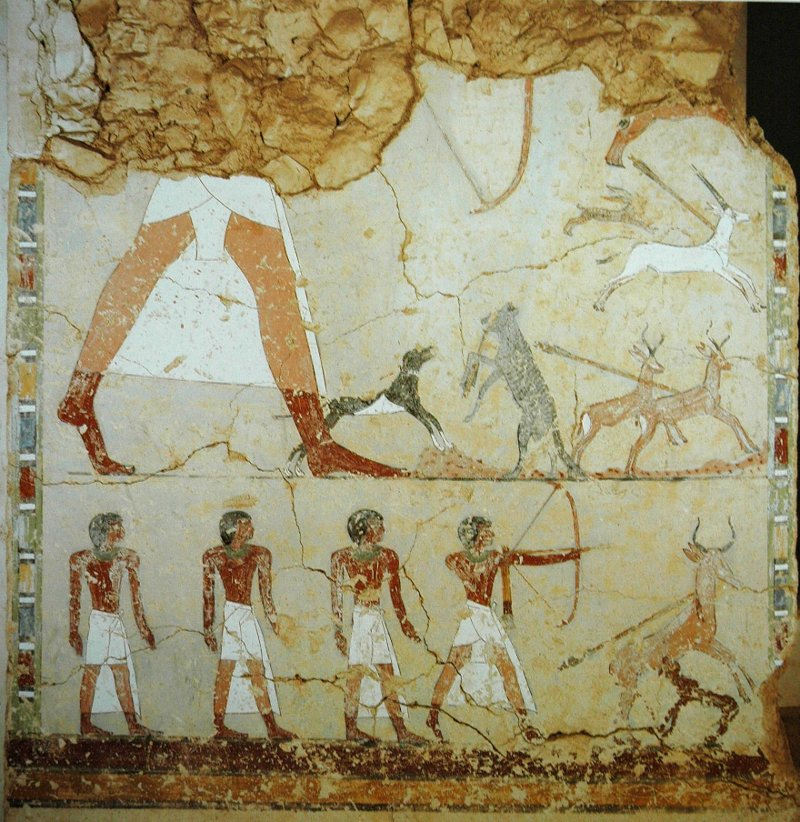
A hunting scene from TT81

== See also ==
- List of Theban tombs
- N. de Garis Davies – Nina and Norman de Garis Davies, Egyptologists
