= Ramose (prince) =

Ancient Egyptian prince; son of Ahmose I

ra ms s
Ramose
in hieroglyphs
Era: New Kingdom
(1550–1069 BC)

Ramose was an ancient Egyptian prince of the Eighteenth Dynasty; probably the son of Pharaoh Ahmose I.

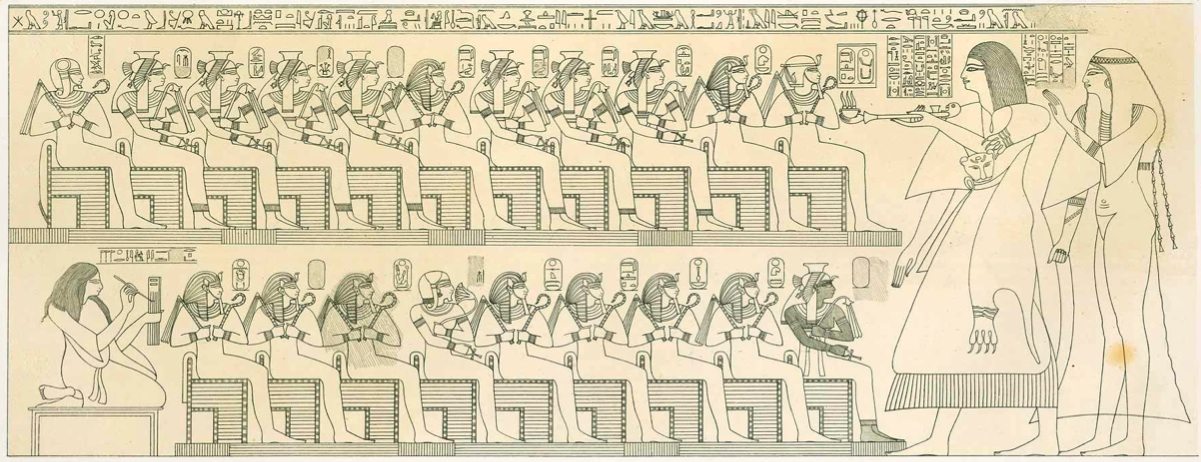
Inherkau and his wife before the Lords of the West, Lepsius Denkmahler. Top row, right to left: Amenhotep I, Ahmose I, Ahhotep I, Ahmose-Meritamun, Sitamun, Siamun,?, Ahmose-Henuttamehu, Ahmose-Tumerisy, Ahmose-Nebetta, Ahmose Sapair; Bottom row, right to left: Ahmose-Nefertari, Ramesses I, Mentuhotep II, Amenhotep II, Seqenenre Tao, Ramose?, Ramesses IV, ?, Tuthmosis I.

He is depicted in the 20th Dynasty tomb of Inherkhau (TT359) among the "Lords of the West" with several of his family members and a few important pharaohs (among the depicted are (Amenhotep I, Ahmose I, Ahhotep, Ahmose Meritamon, Ahmose Sitamun, Siamun, Ahmose Henuttamehu, Ahmose Tumerisy, Ahmose Nebetta, Ahmose Sipair, Ahmose Nefertari, Ramesses I, Mentuhotep II, Amenhotep II, Seqenenre Tao II, Ramesses IV, Thutmose I). A statue of his is owned by the University of Liverpool.
