= Pyramid of Ahmose =

Smooth-sided pyramid

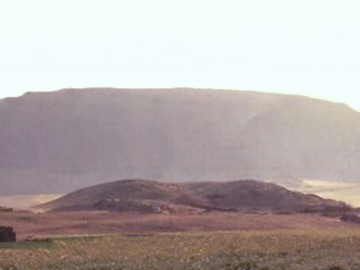
- Pyramid of Ahmose, Abydos.
- Interactive map of Pyramid of Ahmose
- 26°10′30″N 31°56′16″E
- Owner: Ahmose I, 18th Dynasty
- Type: Cenotaph
- Material: sand and rubble inside a limestone casing
- Height: 45 m (148 ft) (original); 10 m (33 ft) (current)
- Base: 52.5 m (172 ft)
- Slope: 60°

The pyramid of Ahmose is a pyramid erected in the reign of the Ancient Egyptian king Ahmose I, ca. 1550-1525 BC, (Note: Dating according to Jürgen von Beckerath; older scholarship dates gives the dates 1530-1504 BC (Helck) or 1539-1514 BC (Krauss).) at Abydos in Upper Egypt. It was the last royal pyramid to be built in Egypt, since Ahmose I's successors also decided not to be interred in pyramids, and is the only royal pyramid to have been built from the beginning as a cenotaph rather than an actual tomb.

The pyramid is now totally ruined and appears like a shallow hill, about 10 metres in height. It forms part of an unusual complex, consisting of a valley temple near the River Nile, at least four temples around the pyramid itself, and to the south of the pyramid another pyramid for the king's grandmother Tetisheri, a symbolic tomb of Osiris, and a terrace temple. The complex was excavated between 1899 and 1904 and further excavations have been ongoing since 1993.

== Research ==
The complex was first investigated and identified as a pyramid by Arthur Mace and Charles Trick Currelly between 1899 and 1902 on behalf of the Egypt Exploration Fund. Their work was partial and gave only a rough overview of the structure. The excavations focussed on the pyramid temple. Mace also dug a tunnel under the pyramid, in order to locate a hypothesised lower chamber. Currelly carried out further work in the area until 1904.

From 1993 to the early 2010s, excavations were undertaken on the complex by Stephen P. Harvey as part of the Ahmose and Tetisheri Project, which identified numerous relief fragments and made clear that the Tetisheri-chapel is a pyramid. In these excavations, many structures outside the temple complex were also uncovered.

Since 2018, the complex and surrounding areas have been the focus of excavation and conservation efforts by the Abydos South Project. In 2023, the project undertook excavation to the local north of the pyramid, identifying a non-royal cemetery that may have been associated with the pyramid complex.

== Context ==
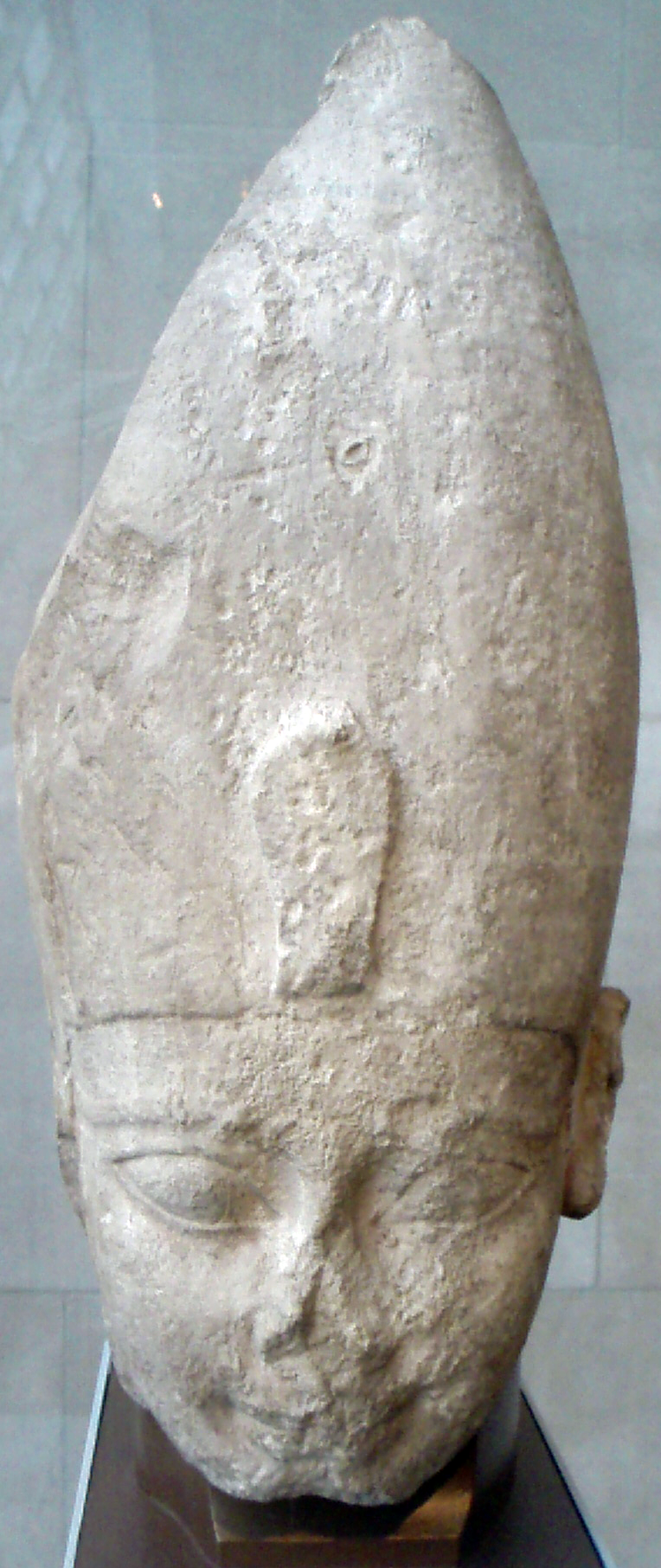
Head of a statue of Ahmose

After his victory over the Hyksos, who had ruled Egypt for more than a hundred years, Ahmose I exercised full sovereignty over the whole country (Upper and Lower Egypt) and this marked the beginning of the New Kingdom. Ahmose's grandmother, Tetisheri, seems to have been a driving force in the efforts to reunify the country.

Although Abydos had been a significant location for religious buildings and tombs since prehistoric times, Ahmose's pyramid was the first large pyramid to be built there. Various rulers of the preceding 17th Dynasty had had tombs there in the form of small pyramids, which did not measure more than 10 metres in length. The layout of Ahmose's pyramid and temple complex differed fundamentally from all earlier pyramid complexes, since the typical schema of Valley Temple, Causeway, Pyramid Temple and Pyramid was not followed. Instead, new elements were introduced to the complex: the Terrace Temple and the Grave of Osiris.

The pyramid was a cenotaph; the actual grave of Ahmose, whose location was long unknown, was probably located in Dra' Abu el-Naga'. It might be the small pyramid discovered by Herbert E. Winlock in 1913, but some scholars have ascribed this tomb to Ahmose's predecessor Kamose or his possible son Ahmose Sapair. The mummies of Ahmose and Tetisheri were found in the Royal Cache at Deir el-Bahari, where they were brought in the 22nd Dynasty to protect them from grave robbers.

The cult of Ahmose in the Pyramid and its temple complex is known from a stele inscribed about three hundred years later in the reign of Ramesses II. The inscription records that a processional boat of the cult of Ahmose was used by the locals as an oracle of the deified king.

== Pyramid ==
1. Pyramid of Ahmose; 2: Hill of rubble 3: Construction ramp 4: Pyramid Temple 5: Temple A 6: Temple B 7: Temple C

The pyramid measured 52.5 m (172 ft) on each side, which corresponds to 100 royal cubits, and consisted of a core of rubble and sand, which was hidden with a cladding of fine limestone. This core was given form by the cladding and had no structural support of its own. In his excavations, Mace found cladding stones still in situ in two spots, from which he was able to calculate the slope of the pyramid as 60°, making it substantially steeper than the pyramids of the Old and Middle Kingdoms. Based on this slope, the pyramid would have been 45 metres tall.

After the cladding was spoliated in later times, the core lost its coherence and spread out, becoming the ten-meter-high rubble mound that exists today. The core material might have derived from excavation of the underground Grave of Osiris in the southern part of the complex.

A crescent-shaped structure of mud brick between the north side of the pyramid and the pyramid temple was identified by Harvey as the remains of a construction ramp.

The pyramid is the only one of the large Egyptian pyramids which has no substructure, which indicates that it did not serve as an actual tomb. In 1902, Mace dug a tunnel under the ruins from the north side, searching in vain for a buried entrance tunnel. Later excavations were also unable to find any substructure beneath the pyramid. The existence of chambers within the superstructure of the pyramid can be ruled out because of the looseness of the rubble and sand core.

== Complex ==
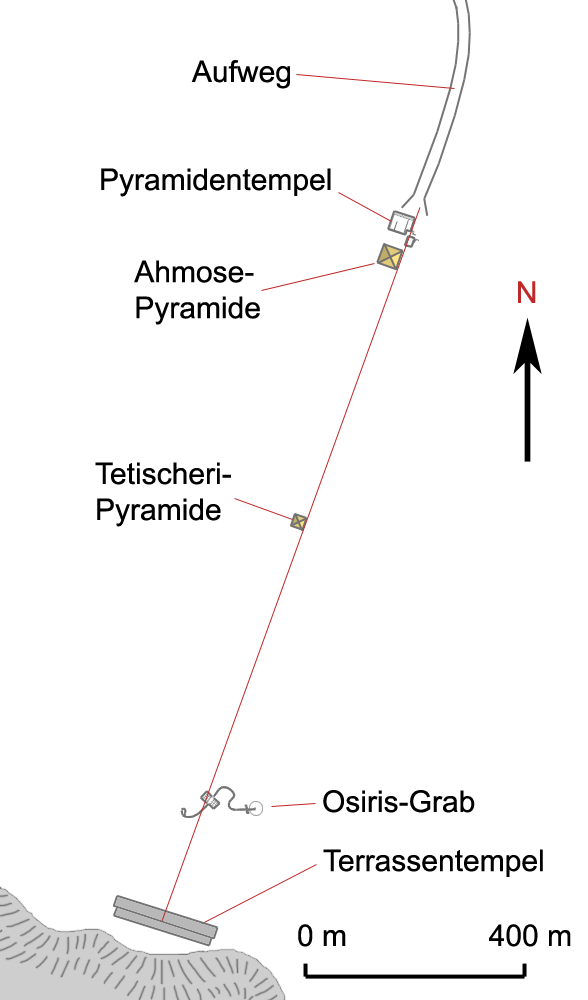
Plan of the pyramid complex of Ahmose. Red: imaginary orientation line

The pyramid complex has a unique layout that was not used for any previous pyramid. The normal complex consisted of a valley temple in the vegetation zone of the valley and another temple in the desert next to the pyramid. Instead, the pyramid of Ahmose had the valley temple near the floodplain of the Nile. Moreover, in the desert, the pyramid was surrounded by multiple temples instead of just one and, beyond the temple further into the desert, there was a tomb of Osiris and a terrace temple. The stretched-out layout recalls the tomb of Osiris which Sesostris III had built at Abydos. The components are precisely aligned and were probably linked by a straight road, although this is no longer detectable. Unlike earlier pyramid complexes, there is no sign of a precinct wall.

=== Pyramid temples ===
The pyramid temple was located on the north side of the pyramid but was not directly attached to it. The structure has thick walls and accessway, leading to a central courtyard. At the back of this, there was a colonnade. Near the entrance there were two holes which might have contained trees. Harvey found over 2000 painted relief fragments in the temple area, which depict Ahmose fighting the Hyksos and once decorated the temple. These reliefs include the oldest known depictions of horses with war chariots in Egypt.

Another smaller temple (Temple A) was located at the northeast corner of the pyramid and was dedicated to Ahmose and his sister-wife Ahmose-Nefertari. This structure was falsely identified by earlier scholars as a cult pyramid on account of its location. Directly to the east of Temple A are the remains of another temple (Temple B), which was dedicated to Ahmose. A larger temple (Temple C) was located to the north of it, next to the main pyramid temple. It was dedicated to Ahmose Nefertari.

To the east, are the ruins of a building for provisioning or administration. However, the eastern part of the complex is now the site of a modern cemetery, so it is not accessible to researchers.

=== Pyramid of Tetisheri ===
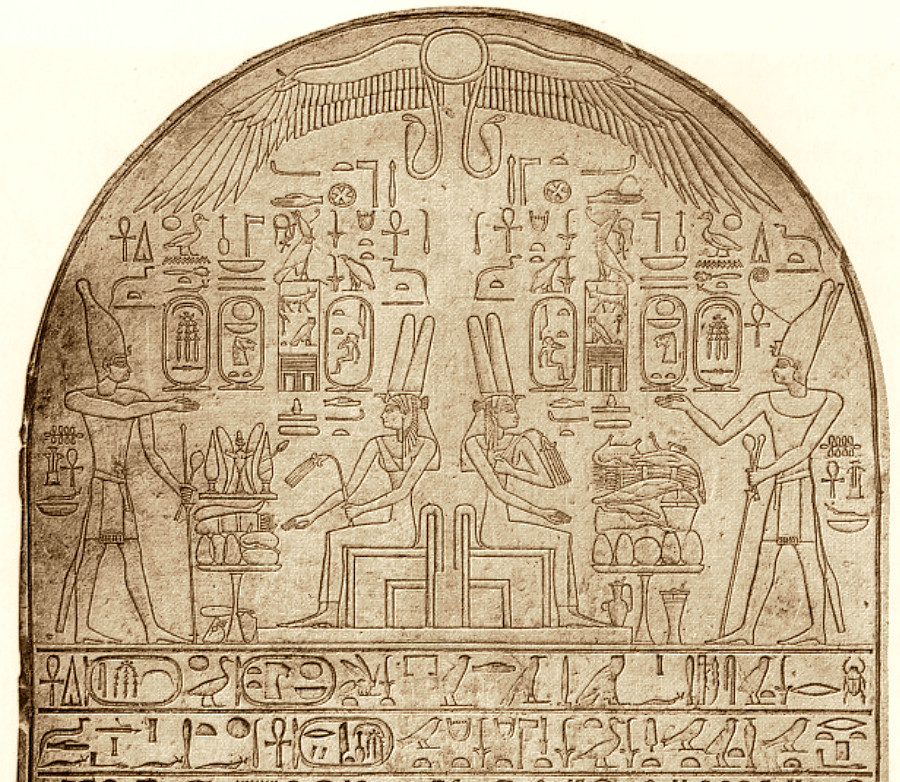
Tetisheri Stele (CG 34002)

Halfway between the pyramid of Ahmose and the terrace temple are the remains of a brick structure, measuring 21 metres by 23 metres, which was originally identified as a shrine of Ahmose's grandmother Tetisheri on the basis of an inscription found there. In 1902 another stele (CG 34002) was found in the ruins, which refers to the pyramid and temple of Tetisheri. In this inscription, Ahmose tells his wife about his plans to erect a pyramid as a memorial for Tetisheri, who was buried in Thebes. (Note: Catalogue Général 34002, Egyptian Museum, Cairo)

"I am blessed, who remember the mother of my mother and the mother of my father, the great royal wife and queen mother, Tetisheri. She has her funerary chapel still in the earth of Thebes and Abydos. My Majesty wishes, that a pyramid and a funerary temple be erected for her near my memorial in the sublime land." The lake of the funerary temple was dug, the trees planted, and the offerings gathered, and it was provided with estates and herds.

— Tetisheri Stele (CG 34002)

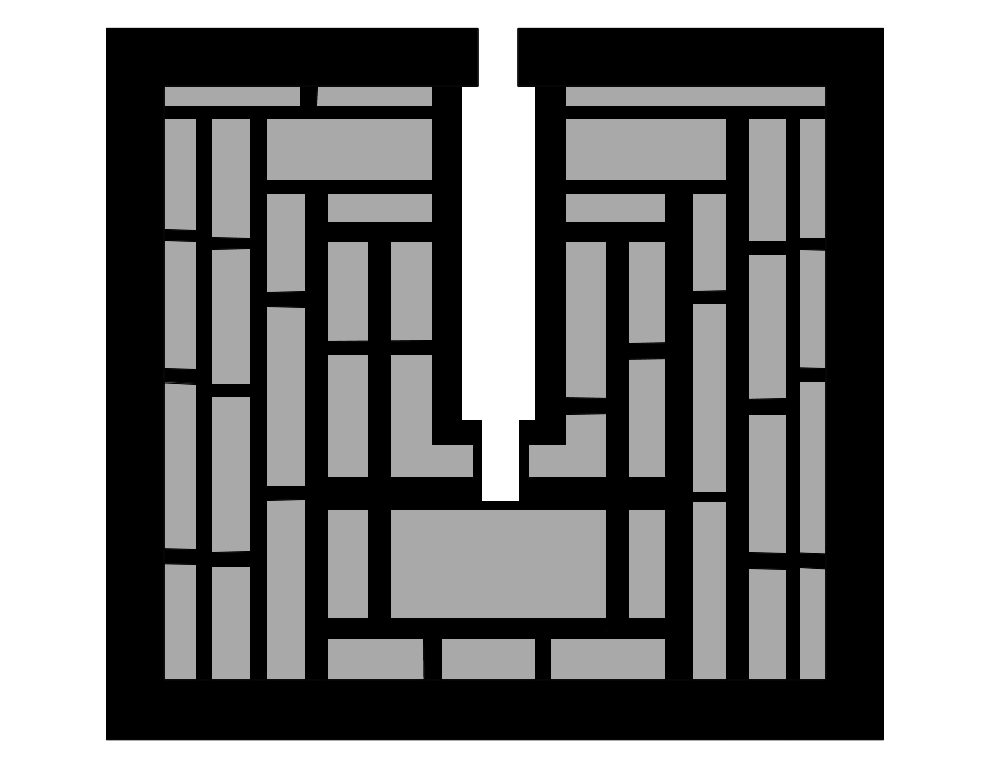
Casemate-foundations of the Tetisheri pyramid.

When this stele was found, it was supposed that the reference to a pyramid was only symbolic, since the ruins were not recognised as a pyramid structure. The gardens and artificial lake mentioned by the inscription have not been detected archaeologically.

Newer work by Harvey proves that the structure was an actual pyramid. Unusually, it was erected on a foundation of brick casemates filled with rubble. An entranceway ran between these casemates to the centre of the pyramid. Excavations revealed fragments of the pyramidion, which indicates that the angle of inclination was similar to that of Ahmose's pyramid. The discovery confirmed that the inscribed stele was referring to a literal pyramid. Traces of a mud-brick enclosure wall around the pyramid, measuring 90 x 70 metres, were also detected. There are traces of several small buildings inside this enclosure, but their purpose is not known.

=== Tomb of Osiris ===
Plan of the Tomb of Osiris 1: Entrance 2: Side chambers 3: Hall of columns 4: Grotto

In the southern part of the complex was a Tomb of Osiris. This was a symbolic grave of the dead god Osiris, whose body had been scattered across the whole land according to the Osiris myth. It could also be seen as a symbolic version of the underworld.

The tomb of Osiris is similar to that of Sesostris III, but very roughly built. The entrance hole was not very visible and did not differ from the entrance to the grave of an ordinary Egyptian. The underground entranceway was roughly cut from the rock. Shortly after the entrance were two small side chambers. Midway along the passage there was a hall with 18 pillars cut from the rock, which has the same height as the passageway. Beyond the hall, the passageway descended further until it reached a simple grotto. The walls of the chambers and the passageway were not plastered or decorated. The tomb is located on the orientation line running from the pyramid to the terrace temple, like the other buildings of the complex.

=== Terrace temple ===
At the south end of the complex, was a terrace temple, located at the base of a cliff. Votive offerings in the form of ceramic vessels, models of boats, and stone vases were found here. The temple was reached by climbing up several staircases and trapezoid rooms. Above this, a corridor led south to a small chamber, where there was probably a statue of the ruler standing on a podium.

== Significance ==
The pyramid of Ahmose was the last royal pyramid to be erected in Egypt. While the resumption of pyramid building in the Middle Kingdom had led to the erection of a series of pyramids, this would be the only pyramid built in the New Kingdom and none of Ahmose's successors seem to have attempted to build a pyramid, opting instead for rock-cut tombs in what would become known as the Valley of the Kings. However, private graves in the New Kingdom were often topped with small pyramidal structures. Much later, the Nubian kings who ruled over Egypt as the 25th Dynasty, built Nubian pyramids for themselves, but these were located outside the traditional area of Egypt.

== See also ==
- List of Egyptian pyramids
- Egyptian pyramid construction techniques

== Bibliography ==
General

- Mark Lehner: Geheimnis der Pyramiden. ECON, Düsseldorf 1997, ISBN 3-572-01039-X, S. 190 ff.
- Hermann Schlögl: Das alte Ägypten. Beck, München 2008, ISBN 3-406-48005-5.
- The Abydos South Project: Work at South Abydos, Website, 2026, abydossouth.com/work.

Excavation reports

- Stephen P. Harvey: Abydos. (Volltext als PDF; 484 KB). In: The Oriental Institute 2002–2003 Annual Report. The Oriental Institute of the University of Chicago, Chicago 2003.
- Stephen P. Harvey: (MS Word; 2,3 MB). In: Tenth International Congress of Egyptologists. University of the Aegean, Rhodes 2008, S. 113.
- Julia Budka: The Oriental Institute Ahmose and Tetisheri Project at Abydos 2002–2004: The New Kingdom Pottery. (online).
- Stephen P. Harvey: Report on Abydos, Ahmose and Tetisheri Project, 2006-2007 Season. (online).
