= TT358 =

Ancient Egyptian tomb

Theban tomb TT358
- Burial site of Ahmose-Meritamun
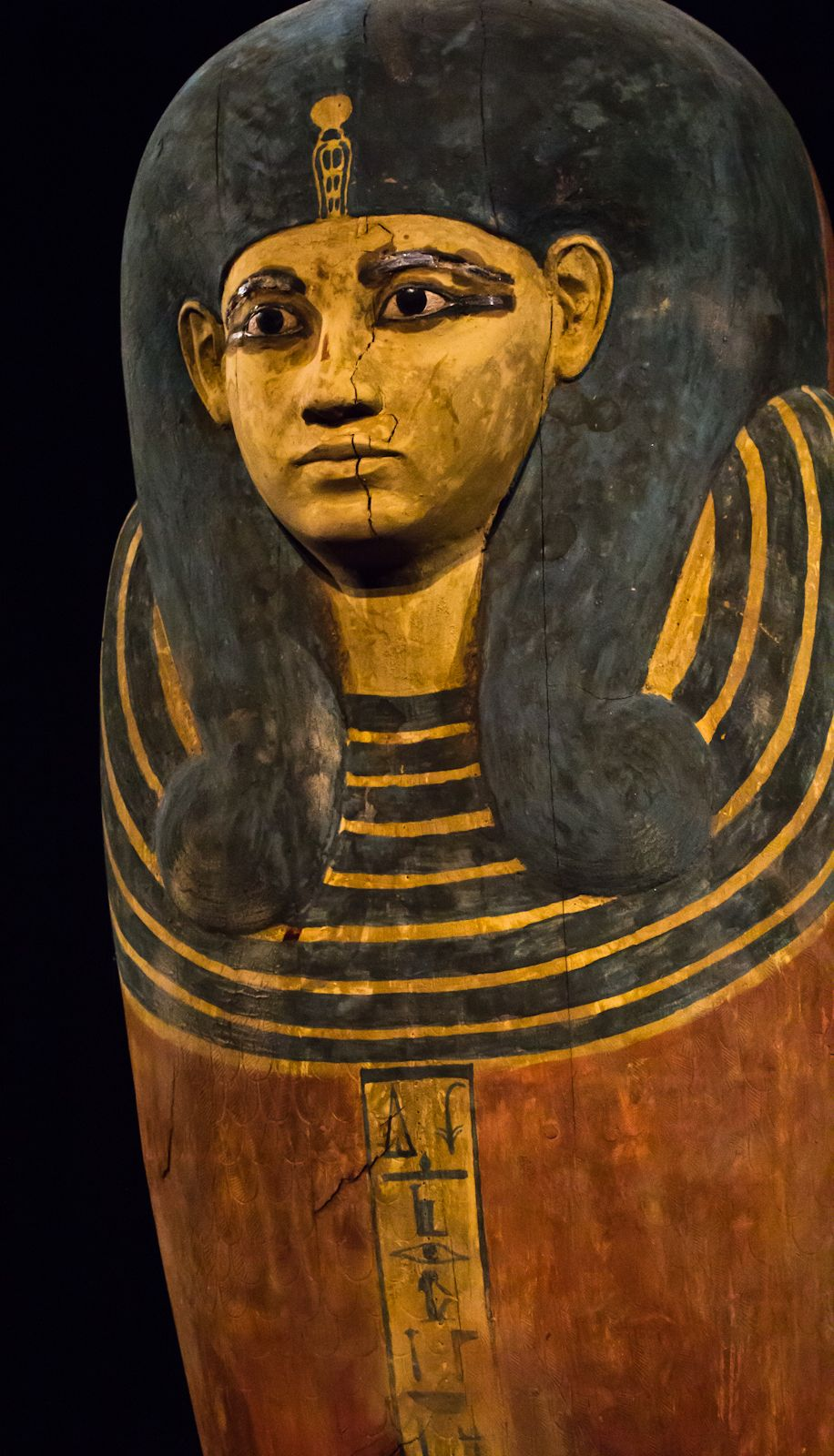
- Ahmose-Meritamun’s inner coffin

- Location within Egypt
- Location: Deir el-Bahari, Theban Necropolis
- Discovered: Eighteenth Dynasty of Egypt
- Excavated by: Discovered by Winlock (1929)
- ← Previous; TT357 Next → TT359

The Theban Tomb TT358 (MMA 65) is located in Deir el-Bahari, part of the Theban Necropolis, on the west bank of the Nile, opposite to Luxor. The tomb belongs to the king's wife Ahmose-Meritamun, the sister and the wife of Pharaoh Amenhotep I. The tomb was later used for the additional burial of the King's daughter Nany, who was a daughter of Pharaoh Pinedjem I.

The tomb was excavated by Winlock during the 1929–30 excavations on behalf of the Metropolitan Museum of Arts. The tomb was discovered in the Court of the Temple of Queen Hatshepsut.

== Ahmose Meritamun ==
iaH ms i mn n mr i i t
Ahmose Meritamun
in hieroglyphs
Era: New Kingdom
(1550–1069 BC)

After excavating the outer corridor a large well was encountered. Planks and a board were brought into the tomb to create a makeshift bridge and Winlock crossed over the well to find an empty chamber. A doorway led to the inner chamber where the burial of Queen Ahmose Meritamun was found. Persea twigs and some saucers were found at the foot of a large coffin.

The outer coffin (now in the Egyptian Museum, JE 53140) is over 10 ft in size and is made from cedar planks which are joined and carved to a uniform thickness throughout the coffin. The eyes and eyebrows are inlaid with glass. The body is carefully carved with chevrons painted in blue to create the illusion of feathers. The coffin was covered in gold which had been stripped in antiquity. The inner coffin was smaller, but still over 6 ft tall. The inner coffin had also been covered in gold but stripped of this precious metal. Her mummy had been rewrapped and reburied by priests who had found her tomb that had been vandalized by robbers. The mummy had been carefully rewrapped during the reign of Pinedjem I. Inscriptions record that the linen used in the reburial was made in year 18 of Pinedjem by the High Priest of Amun Masaharta, son of Pinedjem I. The reburial took place in year 19, month 3 of the winter, day 28.

Ahmose Meritamun's mummy was found in two cedarwood coffins and a cartonnage outer case. It appears that she died when she was relatively young, with evidence of being afflicted with arthritis and scoliosis.

== Nany ==
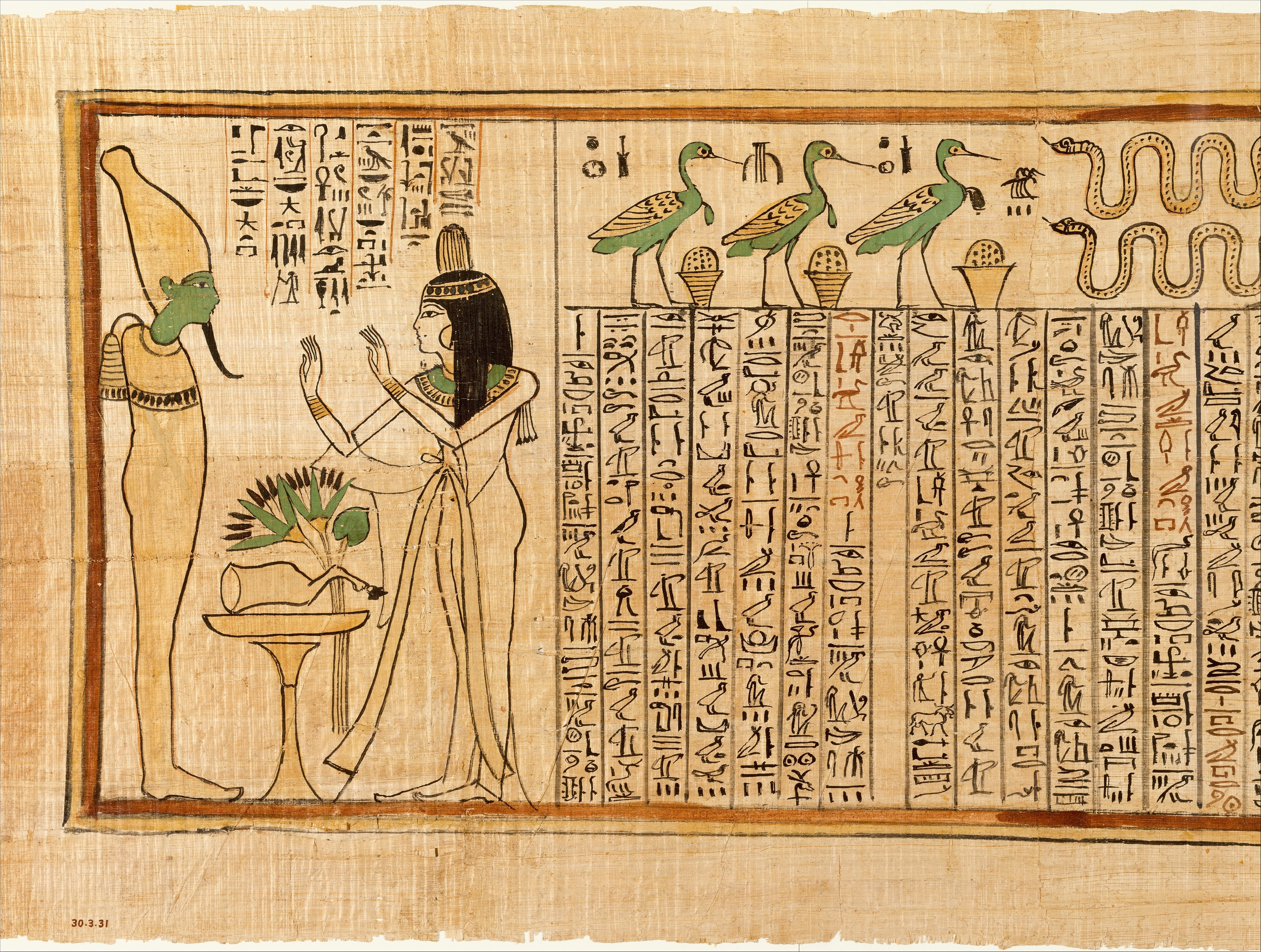
Nany's funerary papyrus

The outer corridor contained the burial of the Lady of the House, the Chantress of Amun Ra, the King's Daughter of his body, his Beloved, Nany. The yellow varnished coffin contained a mummy covered with garlands and a wig. Beyond this coffin a larger outer coffin was found. Further funerary items for the burial included a shabti box and an Osiris figure.

The coffins used for the burial of Nany (called Entiuny in older publications) had originally been made for a woman named Te-net-bekhenu.

== See also ==
- List of Theban tombs
