= Ahmose I =

Pharaoh of Ancient Egypt

- Amosis, according to Manetho, also Amasis, Aahmes
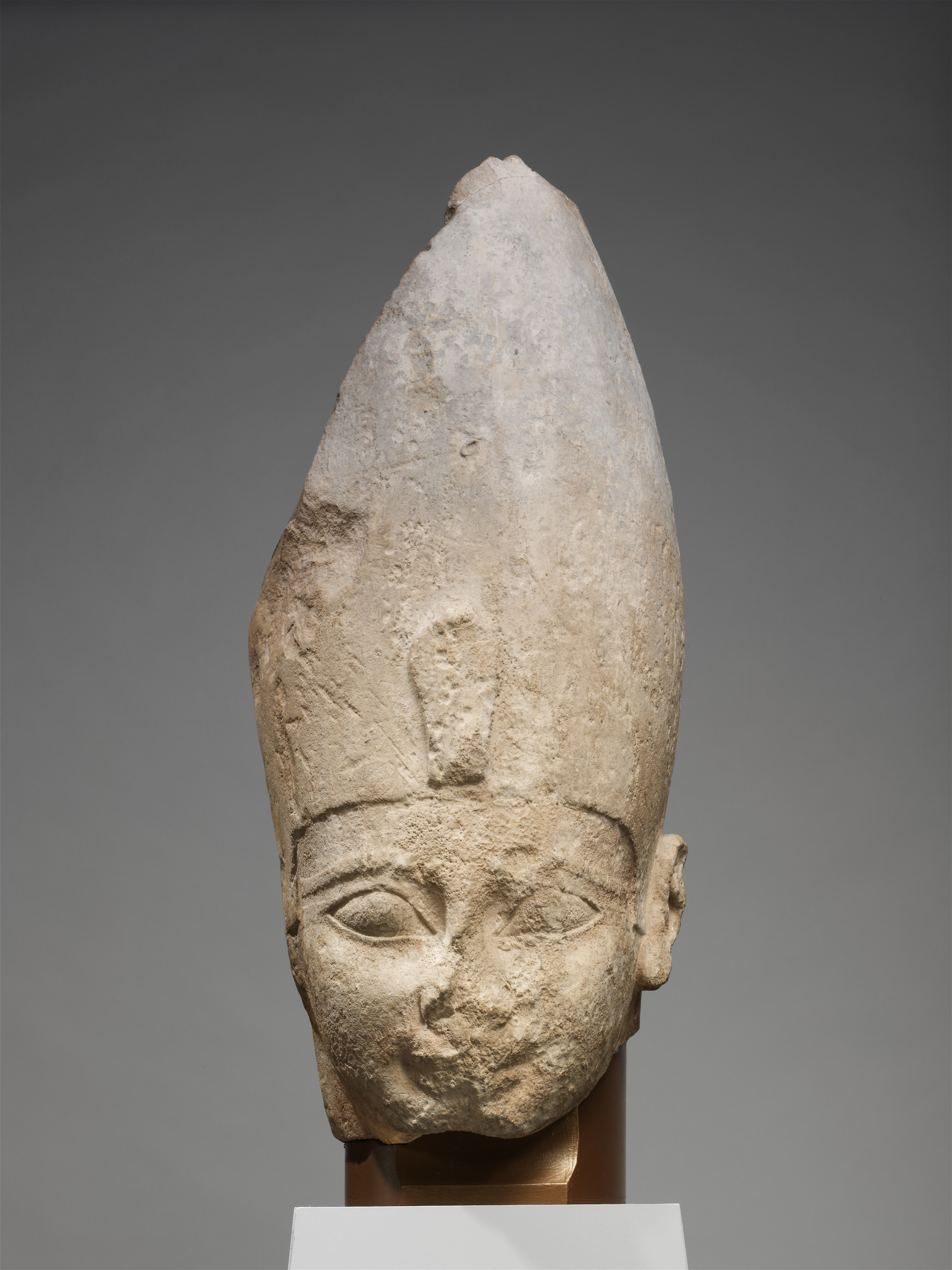
- A fragmentary statue of Ahmose I, Metropolitan Museum of Art

Pharaoh
- Reign: 25 regnal years 1570-1546 BC (HC); 1560–1537 BC; 1551–1527 BC; 1539–1514 BC (Note: Proposed dates for Ahmose I's reign: 1570–1546 BC, starting 1569 BC, 1569–1545 BC, 1552–1526 BC, 1550–1525 BC, starting 1549 BC, 1549–1524 BC, 1539–1515 BC. Radiocarbon studies have yielded the following intervals for Ahmose's date of accession to the throne: 1566–1552 BC with 68% probability, 1570–1544 BC with 95% probability. These studies are based on archaeological samples to measure fluctuations in radiocarbon activity, specific information on radiocarbon activity in the region of the Nile Valley (anchored by dendrochronology to absolute dates), direct linkages between the dated samples and historical chronology and relative dating information. Samples dated to specific reigns were collected from museum collections and excavation material while certain types of material (notably charcoal and mummified remains) were avoided owing to their susceptibility to contamination.); 25 years and 4 months (Manetho)
- Predecessor: Kamose (Upper Egypt); Khamudi (Lower Egypt)
- Successor: Amenhotep I
Royal titulary
Horus name
Aa kheperu
ꜤꜢ-ḫprw
Great of manifestations
Great of Developments
| G5 | O29 L1 G43 |
Nebty name
Tut mesut
Twt mswt
Perfect of Birth
The (very) image of (re-)birth
| G16 | t t A53 F31 t G43 |
Golden Horus
Tjez tawy
Ṯs tꜢwy
He who knots together the Two Lands
| G8 | S24 O34 N17 N17 |
Prenomen
Neb pehty re
Nb pḥty rꜤ
The Lord of Strength is Re

| M23 X1 L2 X1 | ra nb F9 t t |
Nomen
Iah mes(u)
IꜤḥ ms(w)
Iah (the moon god) is born (Ahmose)

| G39 N5 | iaH ms s |
- Consorts: Ahmose-Nefertari, God's Wife of Amun, Ahmose-Sitkamose, Ahmose-Henuttamehu, Kasmut, Thenthapi
- Children: Ahmose-Meritamun; Ahmose-Sitamun; Siamun; Ahmose-ankh; Amenhotep I Ramose; Mutnofret
- Father: Seqenenre Tao
- Mother: Ahhotep I
- Died: 1546 BC (HC); 1527 BC (LC) (aged c. 35)
- Burial: Mummy found in the Deir el-Bahri royal cache, but was likely originally buried in Abydos or Dra' Abu el-Naga'
- Monuments: Pyramid of Ahmose in Abydos, Palace at Avaris, Temple of Amun at Karnak, Temple of Montu at Hermonthis
- Dynasty: 18th Dynasty

Ahmose I (also written Iahmose, Iahmos, Amasis, or Ahmes; Ancient Egyptian: jꜥḥ-ms(.w): "Born of Iah (the Moon)") was a pharaoh and founder of the Eighteenth Dynasty of Egypt in the Egyptian Empire, the era in which ancient Egypt achieved the peak of its power. His reign is usually dated to the mid-16th century BC at the beginning of the Late Bronze Age. Ahmose I is considered an Egyptian national hero; he holds a prominent place in Egyptian history and remains highly regarded by the Egyptian people to this day.

During his rule, Ahmose completed the conquest and expulsion of the Hyksos, restored Theban rule over Lower- and Upper Egypt, and successfully reasserted Egyptian power in its formerly subject territories of Nubia and Canaan. He then reorganized the administration of the country, reopened quarries, mines and trade routes and began massive construction projects of a type that had not been undertaken since the time of the Middle Kingdom. This building program culminated in the construction of the last pyramid built by native Egyptian rulers. Ahmose's reign laid the foundations for the New Kingdom, under which Egyptian power reached its peak.

== Family ==
Ahmose was a member of the Theban royal house, the son of pharaoh Seqenenre Tao and brother of the last pharaoh of the Seventeenth Dynasty, Kamose. During the reign of his father or grandfather, Thebes rebelled against the Hyksos, the rulers of Lower Egypt. When he was seven years old, his father was killed, and he was about ten when his brother died of unknown causes after reigning only three years. Ahmose I assumed the throne after the death of his brother, and upon coronation became known as Nebpehtyre, nb-pḥtj-rꜥ "The Lord of Strength is Ra".

Ahmose descended from the Theban Seventeenth Dynasty. His grandfather and grandmother, Senakhtenre Ahmose and Tetisheri, had at least twelve children, including Seqenenre Tao and Ahhotep I. The brother and sister, according to the tradition of Egyptian queens, married, and had sons Kamose and Ahmose I, as well as several daughters. Ahmose I followed in the tradition of his father and married several of his sisters, making Ahmose-Nefertari his chief wife. They had several children including daughters Meritamun B, Sitamun A and sons Siamun A, Ahmose-ankh, Amenhotep I and Ramose A (the "A" and "B" designations after the names are a convention used by Egyptologists to distinguish between royal children and wives that otherwise have the same name). They may also have been the parents of Mutnofret, who would become the wife of later successor Thutmose I. Ahmose-ankh was Ahmose's heir apparent, but he preceded his father in death sometime between Ahmose's 17th and 25th regnal year. Ahmose was succeeded instead by his eldest surviving son, Amenhotep I, with whom he might have shared a short coregency.

=== Manetho ===
There was no distinct break in the line of the royal family between the Seventeenth and Eighteenth dynasties. The priest and historian Manetho author of a history of Egypt written in the 3rd century BC during the reign of Ptolemy II (283–246 BC), the now lost Aegyptiaca (Αἰγυπτιακά), considered the final expulsion of the Hyksos after nearly a century and the restoration of native Egyptian rule over the whole country a significant enough event to warrant the start of a new dynasty. In a now-lost work, which is referenced by Porphyrios, Manetho credits Ahmose with abolishing the practice of human sacrifice to Hathor at Heliopolis.

== Reign ==
Ahmose I ascended the throne as a "boy king" at the age of 10. He went on to rule about 25 regnal years before he died around the age of 35. The beginning of his reign would have been under a regency until his coming of age. During his reign he successfully defeated the Hyksos in Lower Egypt, reuniting the Two Lands, becoming the "patriarch" of the New Kingdom. He also started military raids into the Levant pursuing the Hyksos.

=== Regency ===
Ahmose ascended the throne when he was still a child, so his mother, Ahhotep, reigned as regent until he was of age. Judging by some of the descriptions of her regal roles while in power, including the general honorific "carer for Egypt", she effectively consolidated the Theban power base in the years before Ahmose assumed full control. If in fact Apepi II was a successor to Apepi I, then he is thought to have remained bottled up in the delta during Ahhotep's regency, because his name does not appear on any monuments or objects south of Bubastis.

=== Campaigns ===
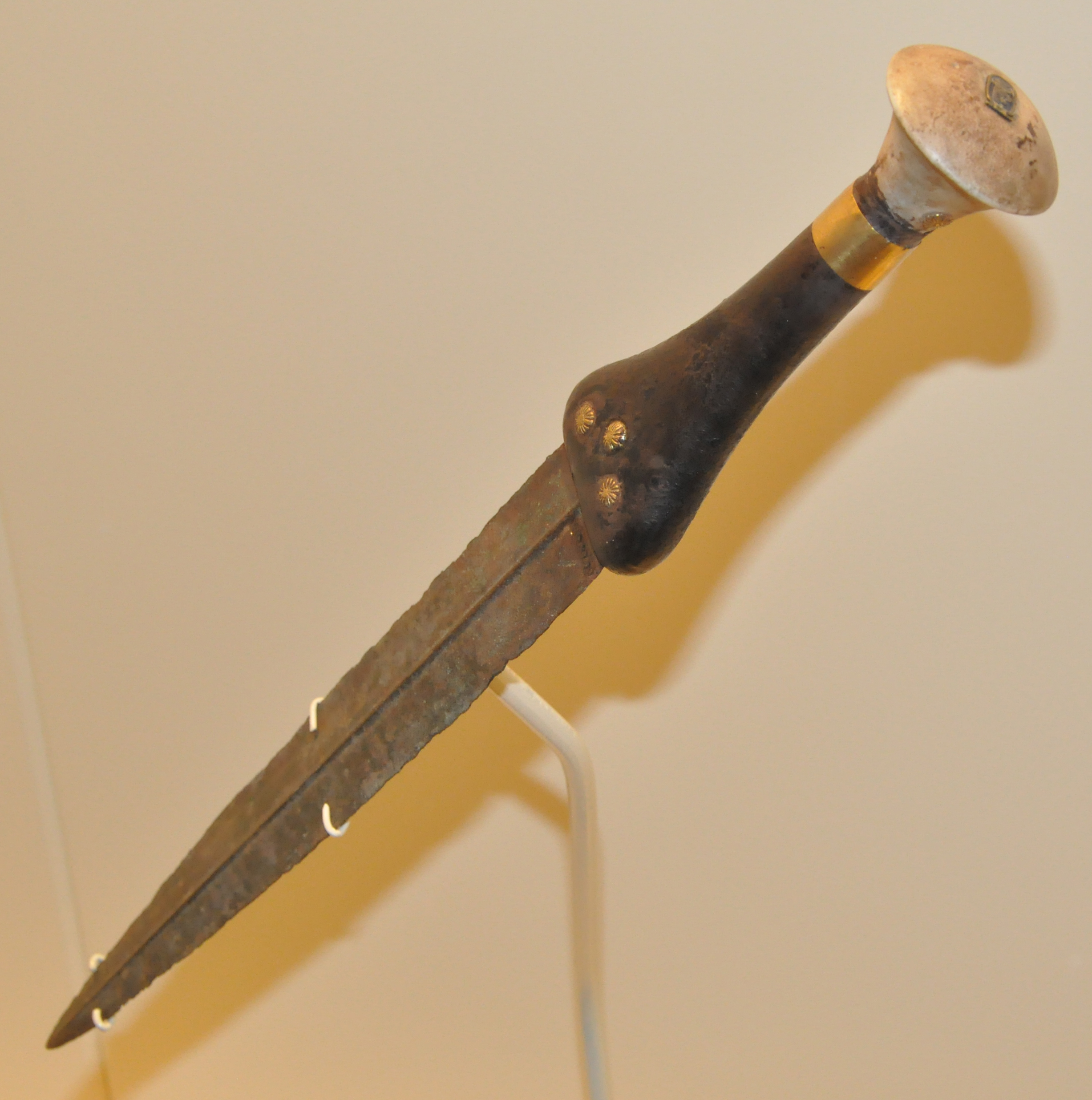
Dagger bearing the name Ahmose I on display at the Royal Ontario Museum, Toronto

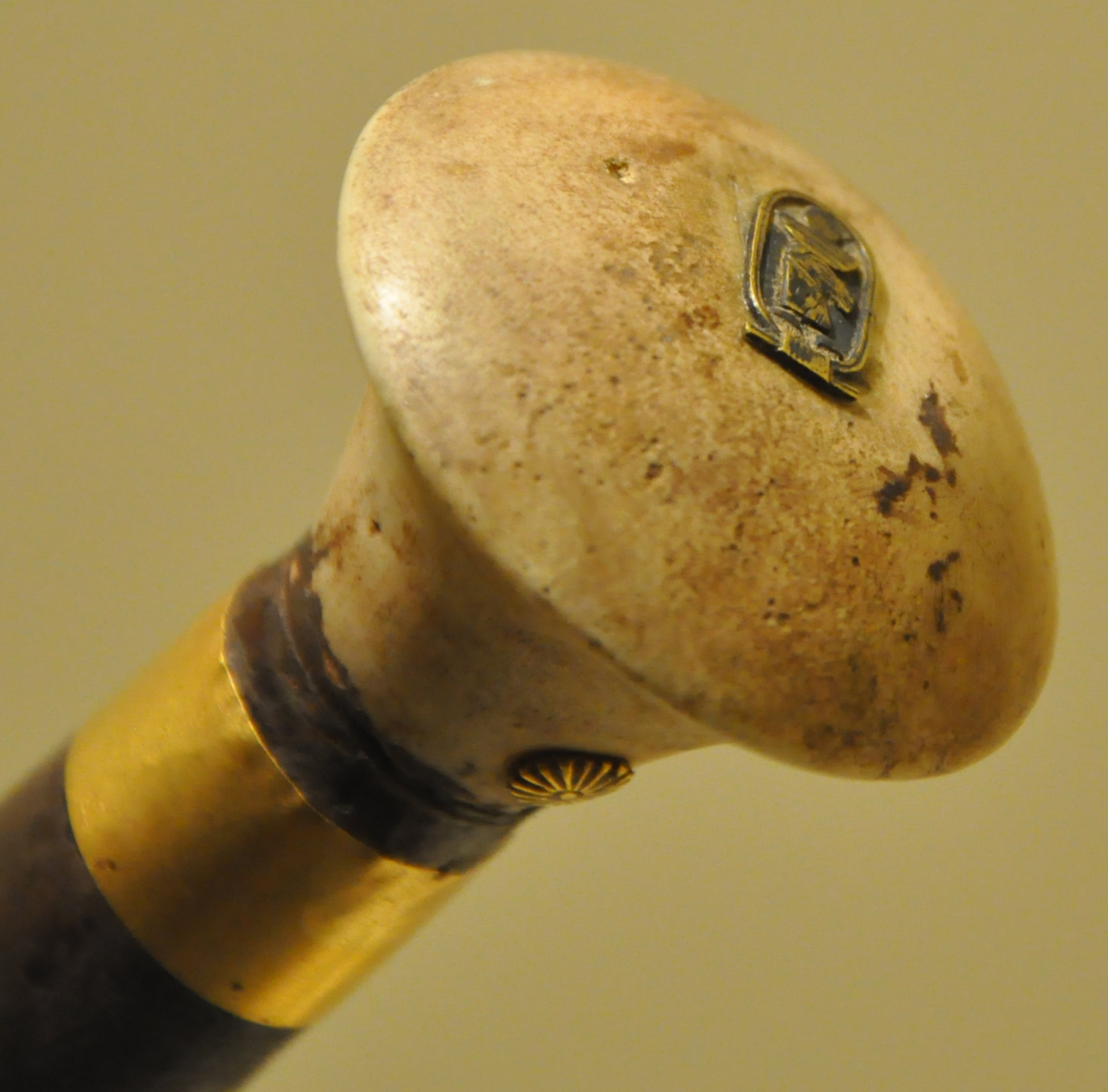
Cartouche of Ahmose I on the dagger pommel, Royal Ontario Museum, Toronto

The conflict between the local kings of Thebes and the Hyksos king Apepi had started during the reign of Ahmose's father, Seqenenre Tao, and would be concluded, after almost 30 years of intermittent conflict and war, during his own reign. Seqenenre Tao was possibly killed in a battle against the Hyksos, as his much-wounded mummy gruesomely suggests, and his successor Kamose (likely Ahmose's elder brother) is known to have attacked and raided the lands around the Hyksos capital, Avaris (modern Tell el-Dab'a). Kamose evidently had a short reign, as his highest attested regnal year is year 3, and was succeeded by Ahmose I. Apepi died around a decade later.

==== Conquest of the Hyksos ====
Ahmose began the conquest of Lower Egypt held by the Hyksos starting around the 11th year of Khamudi's reign, but the sequence of events is not universally agreed upon.

Analyzing the events of the conquest prior to the siege of the Hyksos capital of Avaris is extremely difficult. Almost everything known comes from a brief but invaluable military commentary on the back of the Rhind Mathematical Papyrus, consisting of brief diary entries, one of which reads:

Regnal year 11, second month of shemu, Heliopolis was entered. First month of akhet, day 23, the "Prince of the South" broke into Tjaru.

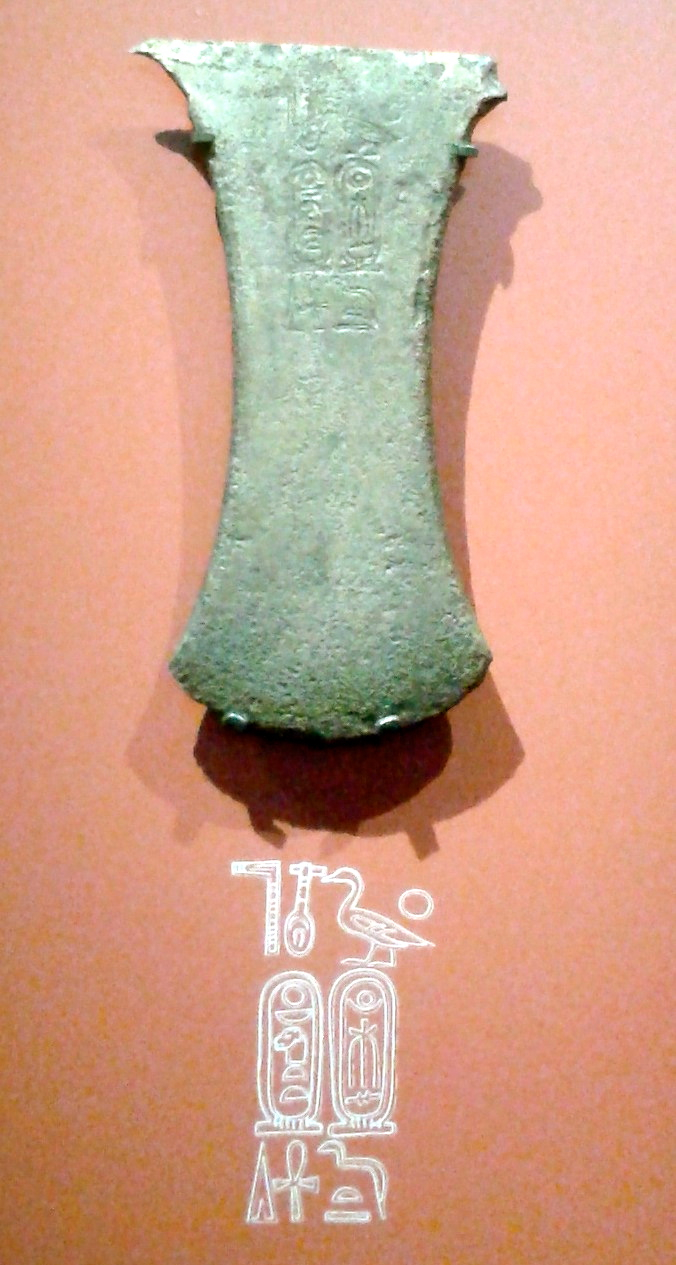
Copper axe blade inscribed with the titulary of pharaoh Ahmose I, Ashmolean Museum

While in the past this regnal year date was assumed to refer to Ahmose, it is today believed instead to refer to Ahmose's Hyksos opponent Khamudi since the Rhind papyrus document refers to Ahmose by the inferior title of "Prince of the South" rather than king or pharaoh, as a Theban supporter of Ahmose surely would have called him. Anthony Spalinger, in a JNES 60 (2001) book review of Kim Ryholt's 1997 book, The Political Situation in Egypt during the Second Intermediate Period, c.1800–1550 BC, notes that Ryholt's translation of the middle portion of the Rhind text chronicling Ahmose's invasion of the Delta reads instead as the "1st month of Akhet, 23rd day. He-of-the-South (i.e. Ahmose) strikes against Sile." Spalinger stresses in his review that he does not question Ryholt's translation of the Rhind text but instead asks whether:

it is reasonable to expect a Theban-oriented text to describe its Pharaoh in this manner? For if the date refers to Ahmose, then the scribe must have been an adherent of that ruler. To me, the very indirect reference to Ahmose—it must be Ahmose—ought to indicate a supporter of the Hyksos dynasty; hence, the regnal years should refer to this monarch and not the Theban.

The Rhind Papyrus illustrates some of Ahmose's military strategy when attacking the Delta. Entering Heliopolis in July, he moved down the eastern delta to take Tjaru, the major border fortification on the Horus Road, the road from Egypt to Canaan, in October, totally avoiding Avaris. In taking Tjaru he cut off all traffic between Canaan and Avaris. This indicates he was planning a blockade of Avaris, isolating the Hyksos capital from help or supplies coming from Canaan.

Records of the latter part of the campaign were discovered on the tomb walls of a participating soldier, Ahmose, son of Ebana. These records indicate that Ahmose I led three attacks against Avaris, the Hyksos capital, but also had to quell a small rebellion further south in Egypt. After this, in the fourth attack, he conquered the city. He completed his victory over the Hyksos by conquering their stronghold Sharuhen near Gaza after a three-year siege. Ahmose would have conquered Avaris by the 18th or 19th year of his reign at the very latest. This is suggested by "a graffito in the quarry at Tura whereby 'oxen from Canaan' were used at the opening of the quarry in Ahmose's regnal year 22." Since the cattle would probably have been imported after Ahmose's siege of the town of Sharuhen which followed the fall of Avaris, this means that the reign of Khamudi must have terminated by Year 18 or 19 of Ahmose's 25-year reign at the very latest.

==== Levantine campaigns ====
After defeating the Hyksos, Ahmose began campaigning in Syria and Nubia. A campaign during his 22nd year reached Djahy in the Levant and perhaps as far as the Euphrates, although the later Pharaoh Thutmose I is usually credited with being the first to campaign that far. Ahmose did, however, reach at least as far as Kedem (thought to be near Byblos), according to an ostracon in the tomb of his wife, Ahmose-Nefertari. Details on this particular campaign are scarce, as the source of most of the information, Ahmose, son of Ebana, served in the Egyptian navy and did not take part in this land expedition. However, it can be inferred from archaeological surveys of southern Canaan that during the late 16th century BC Ahmose and his immediate successors intended only to break the power of the Hyksos by destroying their cities and not to conquer Canaan. Many sites there were completely laid waste and not rebuilt during this period—something a Pharaoh bent on conquest and tribute would not be likely to do.

==== Nubian campaigns ====
Ahmose I's campaigns in Nubia are better documented. Soon after the first Nubian campaign, a Nubian named Aata rebelled against Ahmose, but was crushed. After this attempt, an anti-Theban Egyptian named Tetian gathered many rebels in Nubia, but he too was defeated. Ahmose restored Egyptian rule over Nubia, which was controlled from a new administrative center established at Buhen. When re-establishing the national government, Ahmose appears to have rewarded various local princes who supported his cause and that of his dynastic predecessors.

=== Art and monuments ===
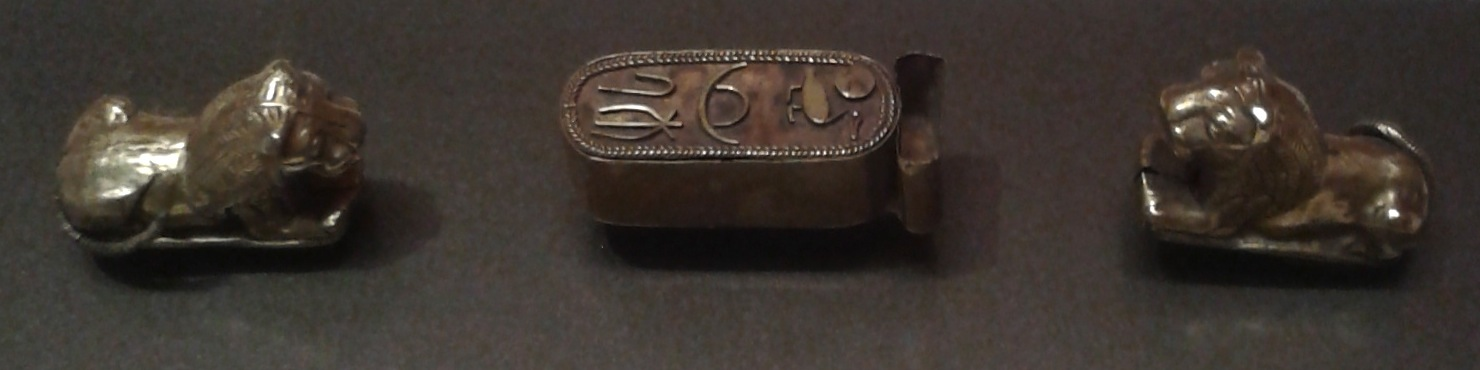
Fragments of an armband of Ahmose I, Musée du Louvre

With the re-unification of Upper and Lower Egypt under Ahmose, a renewal of royal support for the arts and monumental construction occurred. However, as the defeat of the Hyksos occurred relatively late in Ahmose's reign, his subsequent building program likely lasted no more than seven years, and much of what was started was probably finished by his son and successor Amenhotep I.

Work from Ahmose's reign is made of much finer material than anything from the Second Intermediate Period, though the craftsmanship from his reign does not always match the best work from either the Old or Middle Kingdoms. With the Delta and Nubia under Egyptian control once more, access was gained to resources not available in Upper Egypt. Gold and silver were received from Nubia, lapis lazuli from distant parts of central Asia, cedar from Byblos, and in the Sinai the Serabit el-Khadim turquoise mines were reopened. Although the exact nature of the relationship between Egypt and Crete is uncertain, at least some Minoan designs have been found on objects from this period, and Egypt considered the Aegean to be part of its empire. Ahmose reopened the Tura limestone quarries to provide stone for monuments and used Asiatic cattle from Phoenicia to haul the stone, according to his quarry inscription.

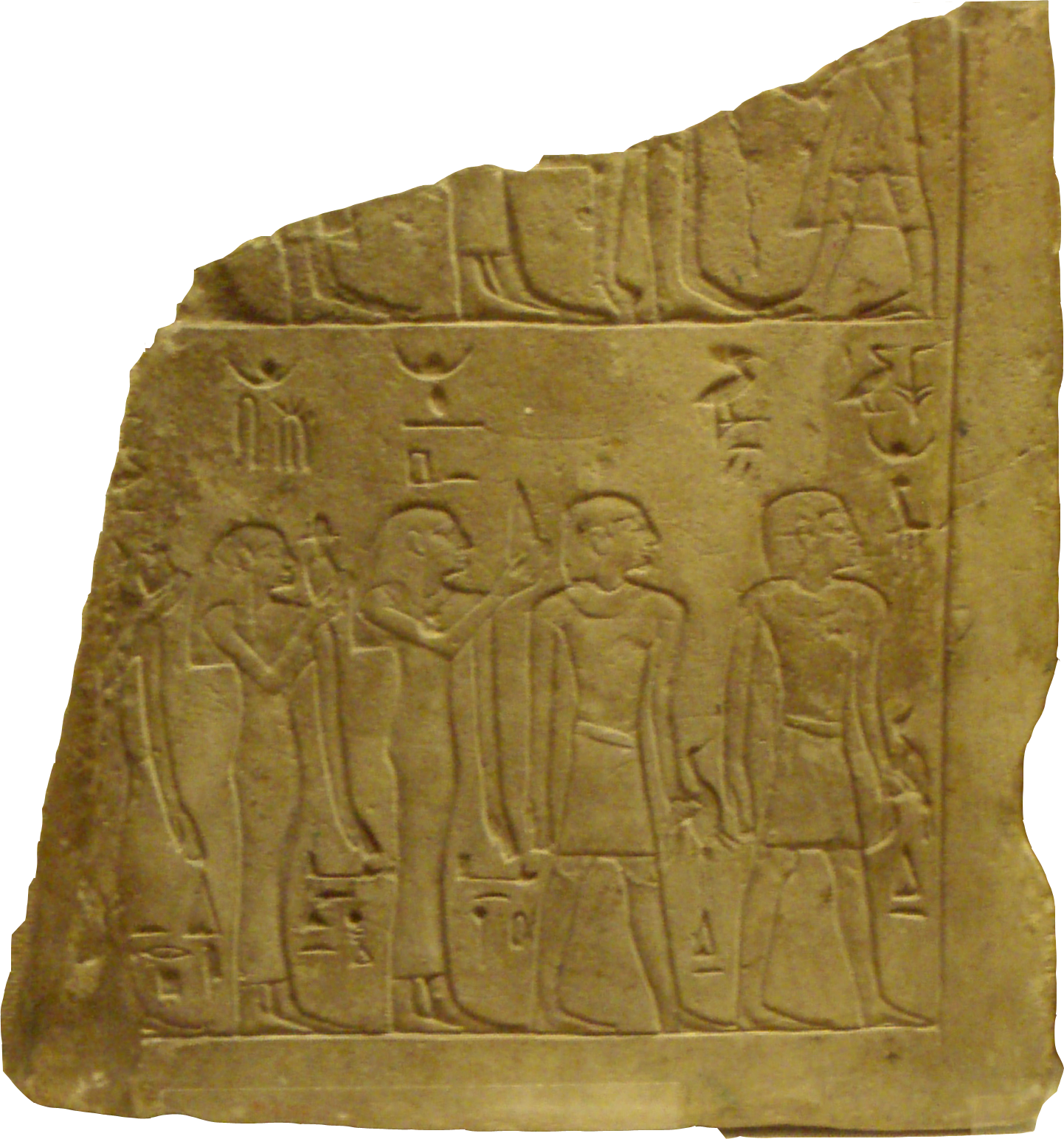
Ahmose I-Fragmentary Stela-Statue Marble Torso Metropolitan Museum Of Art

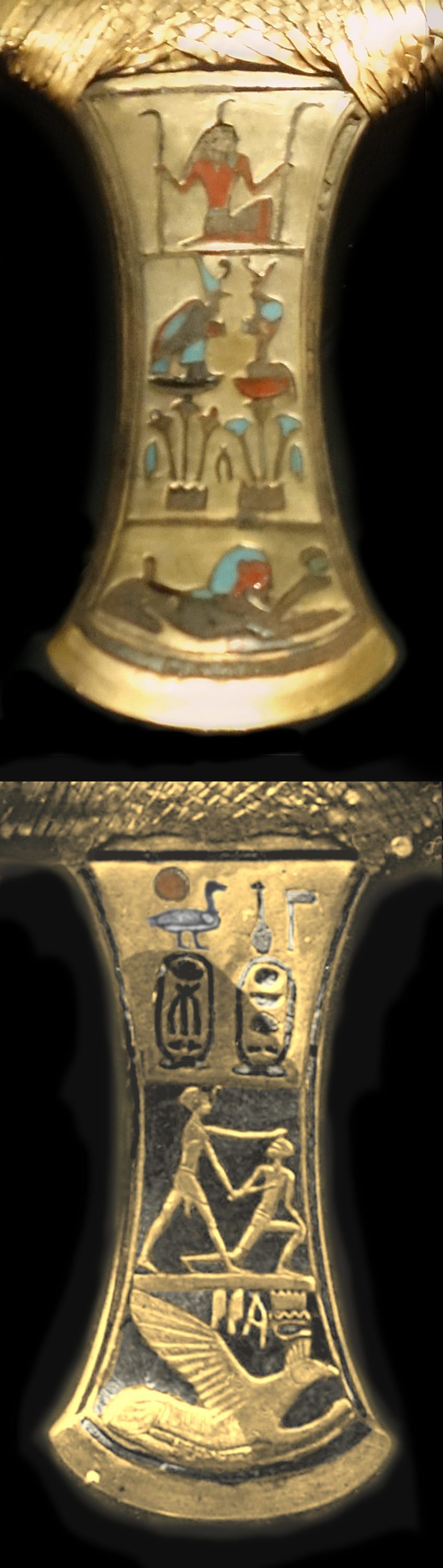
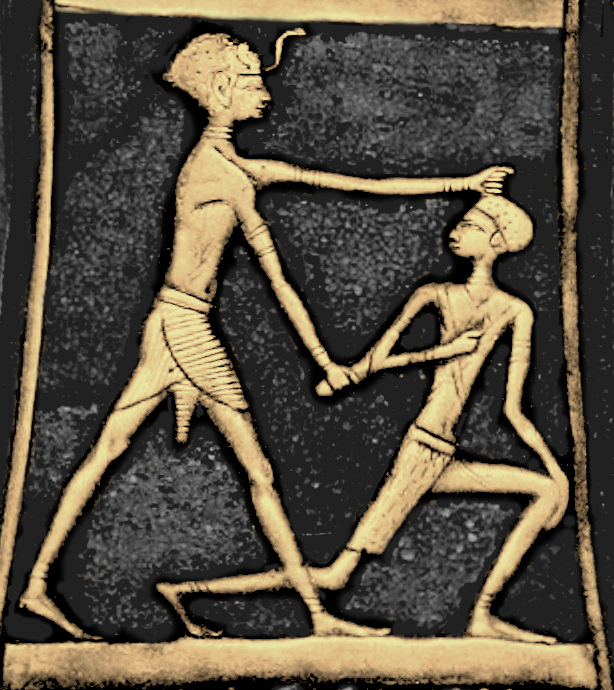
Pharaoh Ahmose I slaying a probable Hyksos. Detail of a ceremonial axe in the name of Ahmose I, treasure of Queen Ahhotep II. Luxor Museum (Note: Pierre Montet, discoverer of the treasure relates that: "Others [objects] were later added to them, things which came from the pharaoh Ahmose, like the axe decorated with a griffin and a likeness of the king slaying a Hyksos, with other axes and daggers".)

The art during Ahmose I's reign was similar to the Middle Kingdom royal Theban style, and stelae from this period were once more of the same quality. This reflects a possibly natural conservative tendency to revive fashions from the pre-Hyksos era. Despite this, only three positively identified statuary images of Ahmose I survive: a single shabti kept at the British Museum, presumably from his tomb (which has never been positively located), and two life-size statues; one of which resides in the New York Metropolitan Museum, the other in the Khartoum Museum. All display slightly bulging eyes, a feature also present on selected stelae depicting the pharaoh. Based on style, a small limestone sphinx that resides at the National Museum of Scotland, Edinburgh, has also been tentatively identified as representing Ahmose I.

The art of glass making is thought to have developed during Ahmose's reign. The oldest samples of glass appear to have been defective pieces of faience, but intentional crafting of glass did not occur until the beginning of the Eighteenth Dynasty. One of the earliest glass beads found contains the names of both Ahmose and Amenhotep I, written in a style dated to about the time of their reigns. If glassmaking was developed no earlier than Ahmose's reign and the first objects are dated to no later than his successor's reign, it is quite likely that it was one of his subjects who developed the craft.

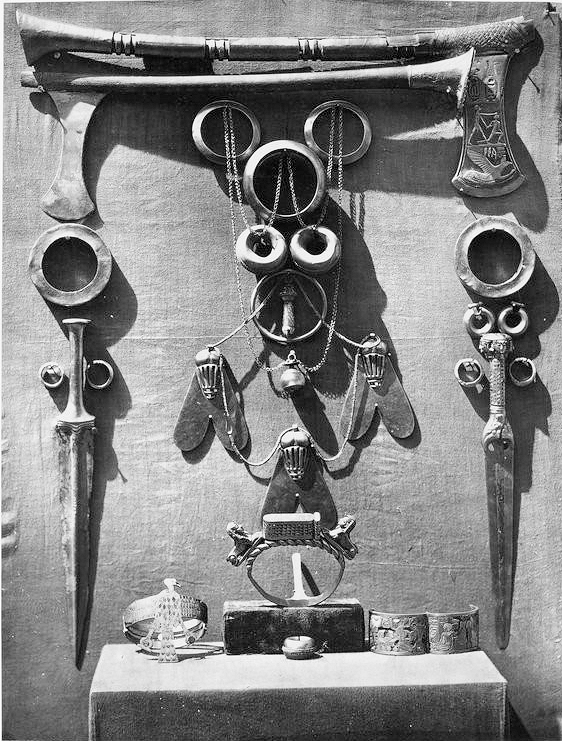
The jewels and ceremonial weaponry found in the burial of Queen Ahhotep, including an axe whose blade depicts Ahmose I striking down a Hyksos soldier, and the golden flies awarded to the Queen for her supportive role against the Hyksos

Ahmose resumed large construction projects like those before the Second Intermediate Period. In the south of the country he began constructing temples mostly built of brick, one of them in the Nubian town of Buhen. In Upper Egypt he made additions to the existing temple of Amun at Karnak and to the temple of Montu at Armant. According to an inscription at Tura, he used white limestone to build a temple to Ptah and the southern harem of Amun, but did not live long enough to finish either project (they would be finished by his son and successor Amenhotep I). He built a cenotaph for his grandmother, Queen Tetisheri, at Abydos.

Excavations at the site of Avaris by Manfred Bietak have shown that Ahmose had a palace constructed on the site of the former Hyksos capital city's fortifications. Bietak found fragmentary Minoan-style remains of the frescoes that once covered the walls of the palace; there has subsequently been much speculation as to what role this Aegean civilization may have played in terms of trade and in the arts.

Under Ahmose's reign, the city of Thebes became the capital for the whole of Egypt, as it had been under the 11th Dynasty in the early Middle Kingdom. It also became the center for a newly established professional civil service, where there was a greater demand for scribes and the literate as the royal archives began to fill with accounts and reports. Having Thebes as the capital was probably a strategic choice as it was located at the center of the country, the logical conclusion from having had to fight the Hyksos in the north as well as the Nubians to the south. Any future opposition at either border could be met easily.

Perhaps the most important shift was a religious one: Thebes effectively became the religious as well as the political center of the country, its local god Amun credited with inspiring Ahmose in his victories over the Hyksos. The importance of the temple complex at Karnak (on the east bank of the Nile north of Thebes) grew and the importance of the previous cult of Ra based in Heliopolis diminished.

Several stelae detailing the work done by Ahmose were found at Karnak, two of which depict him as a benefactor to the temple. In one of these stelae, known as the "Tempest Stele", he claims to have rebuilt the pyramids of his predecessors at Thebes that had been destroyed by a major storm. The Thera eruption in the Aegean has been implicated by some scholars as the source of the damages described in the Tempest Stele.

=== Length and date of reign ===
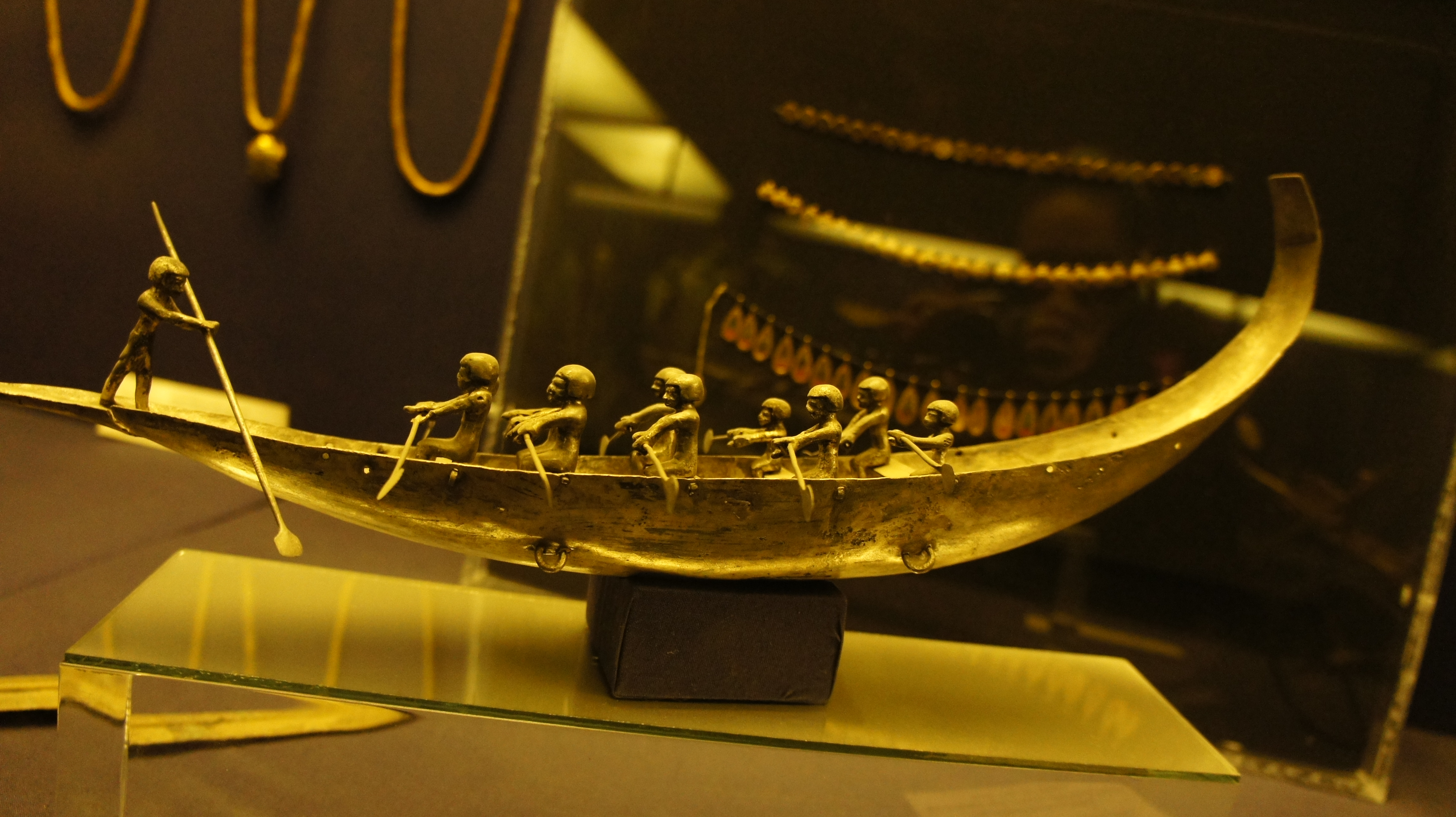
A silver barques or boat donated by Ahmose I to Queen Ahhotep II for her burial

According to Josephus in Contra Apionem and Theophilus of Antioch in his Apologia ad Autolycum, Manetho's Aegyptiaca stated that the pharaoh who expelled the Hyksos from Egypt was named "Tethmôsis" and reigned for 25 years and 4 months. At the opposite, according to the Byzantine scholar George Syncellus, Sextus Julius Africanus wrote that the Aegyptiaca reported the king to be named "Amôs". Syncellus also notes that Eusebius in his Chronicon told that an "Amôsis" or "Amoses"—depending on the version of Eusebius—is mentioned in the Aegyptiaca as reigning 25 years and founding the eighteenth dynasty from Thebes. The 25 years figure is seemingly supported by a 'Year 22' inscription from his reign at the stone quarries of Tura. A medical examination of his mummy indicates that he died when he was about thirty-five, supporting a 25-year reign if he came to the throne at the age of 10. Thus, Ahmose I must have reunited Egypt at age 29.

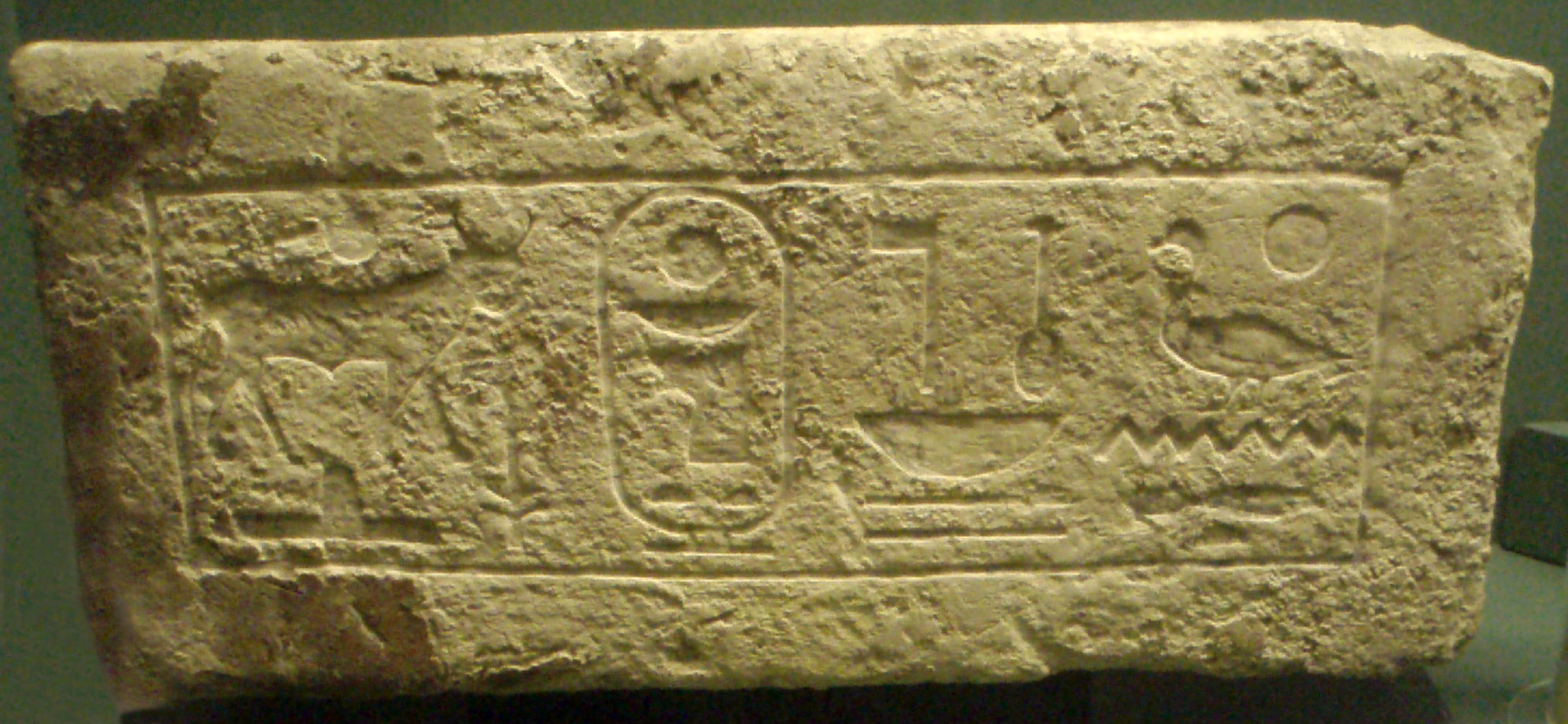
Ahmose I-Cartouche From A Monument Rosicrucian Museum

Ahmose's reign can be fairly accurately dated using the Heliacal rise of Sirius in his successor's reign, but because of disputes over from where the observation was made, he has been assigned a reign from 1570 to 1546 BC, 1560–1537 BC, 1551–1527 BC and 1539–1514 BC by various sources. The radiocarbon date range for the start of his reign is 1570–1544 BC, the mean point of which is 1557 BC. (Note: Significantly reduced dates for his reign (1194 to 1170 BC) were suggested by David Rohl, but these were rejected by the majority of Egyptologists. A radiocarbon study published in 2010 suggested minor revisions in the traditional chronology but did not support Rohl's theory.)

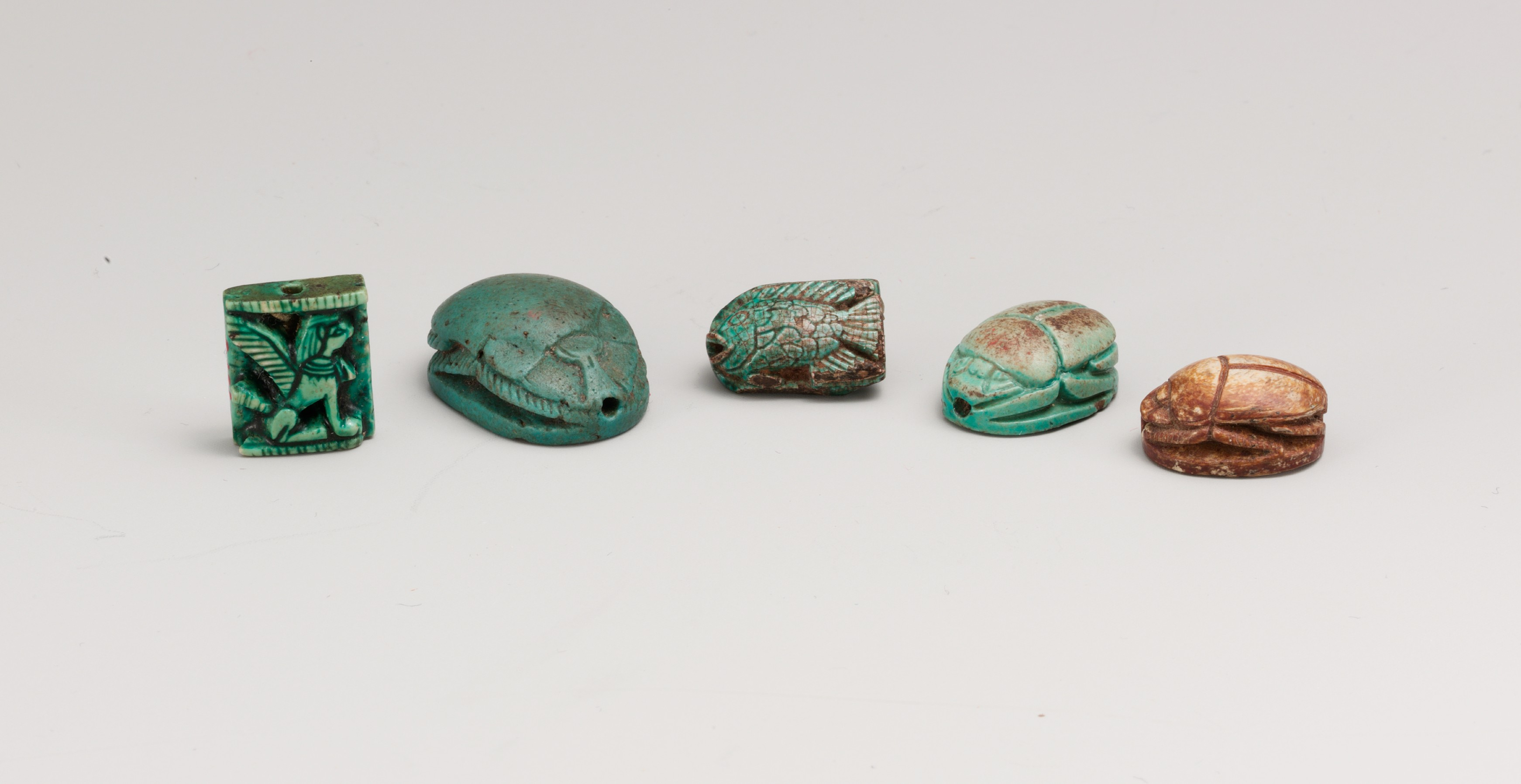
Winged Griffin Plaque Inscibed with the Name Nebpehtyre (Ahmose I) MET DP112344

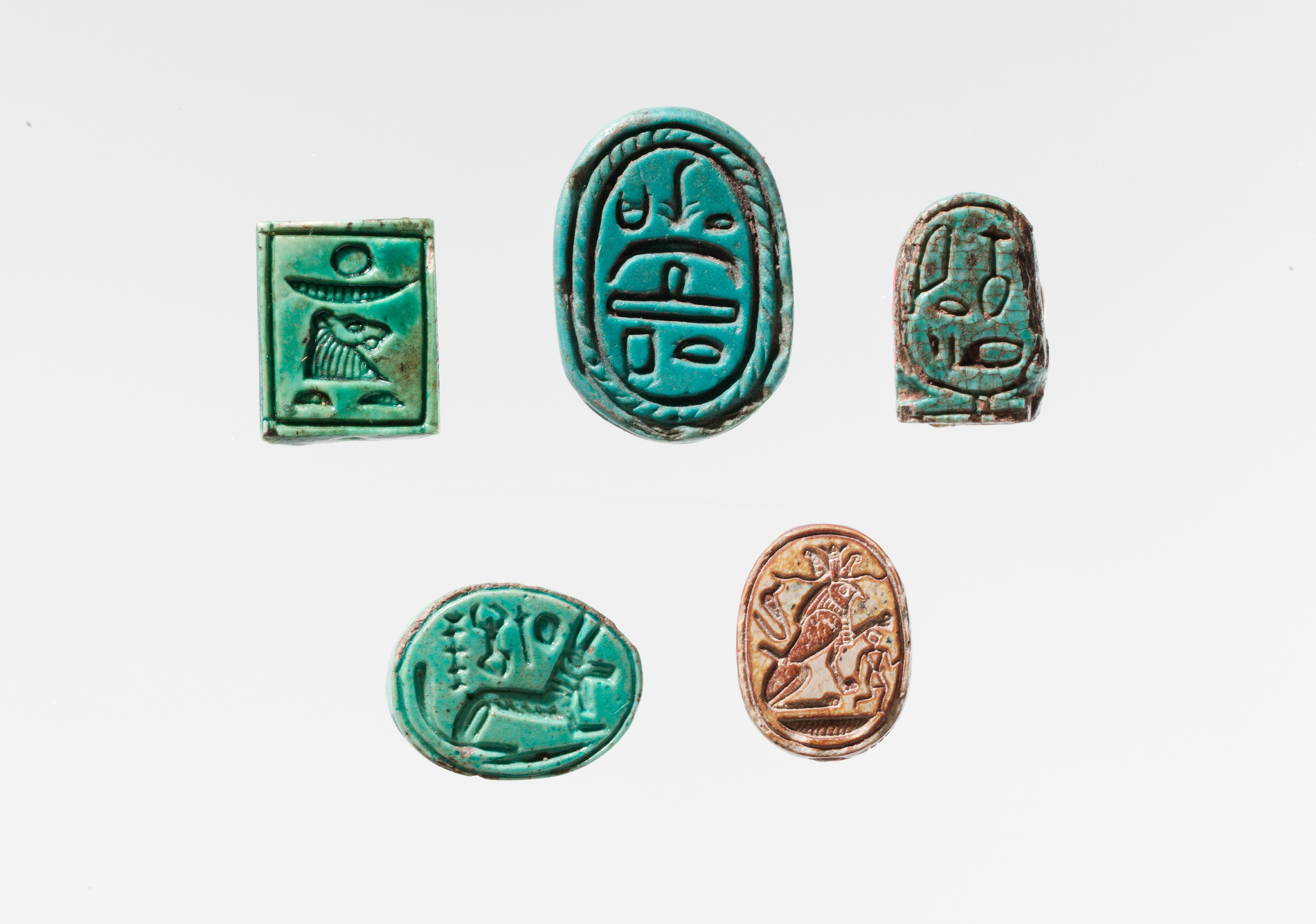
Winged Griffin Plaque Inscibed with the Name Nebpehtyre (Ahmose I)

== Death ==
=== Pyramid ===
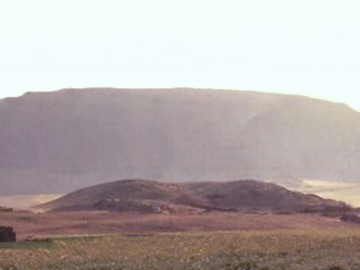
The ruins of the Pyramid of Ahmose

The remains of Ahmose's pyramid in Abydos were discovered in 1899 and identified as his in 1902. Most of its outer casing stones had been robbed for use in other building projects over the years, and the mound of rubble upon which it was built has collapsed. However, two rows of intact casing stones were found by Arthur Mace, who estimated its steep slope as about 60 degrees, based on the evidence of the limestone casing (compare to the less acute 51 degrees of the Great Pyramid of Giza). Adjacent to the main pyramid temple and to its east, Harvey has identified two temples constructed by Ahmose's queen, Ahmose-Nefertari. One of these structures also bears bricks stamped with the name of Chief Treasurer Neferperet, the official responsible for re-opening the stone quarries at el-Ma'asara (Tura) in Ahmose's year 22. A third, larger temple (Temple C) is similar to the pyramid temple in form and scale, but its stamped bricks and details of decoration reinforce that it was a cult place for Ahmose-Nefertari.

The axis of the pyramid complex may be associated with a series of monuments strung out along a kilometer of desert. Along this axis are several key structures: 1) a large pyramid dedicated to his grandmother Tetisheri which contained a stele depicting Ahmose providing offerings to her; 2) a rock-cut underground complex which may either have served as a token representation of an Osirian underworld or as an actual royal tomb; and 3) a terraced temple built against the high cliffs, featuring massive stone and brick terraces. These elements reflect in general a similar plan undertaken for the cenotaph of Senwosret III and in general its construction contains elements which reflect the style of both Old and Middle Kingdom pyramid complexes.

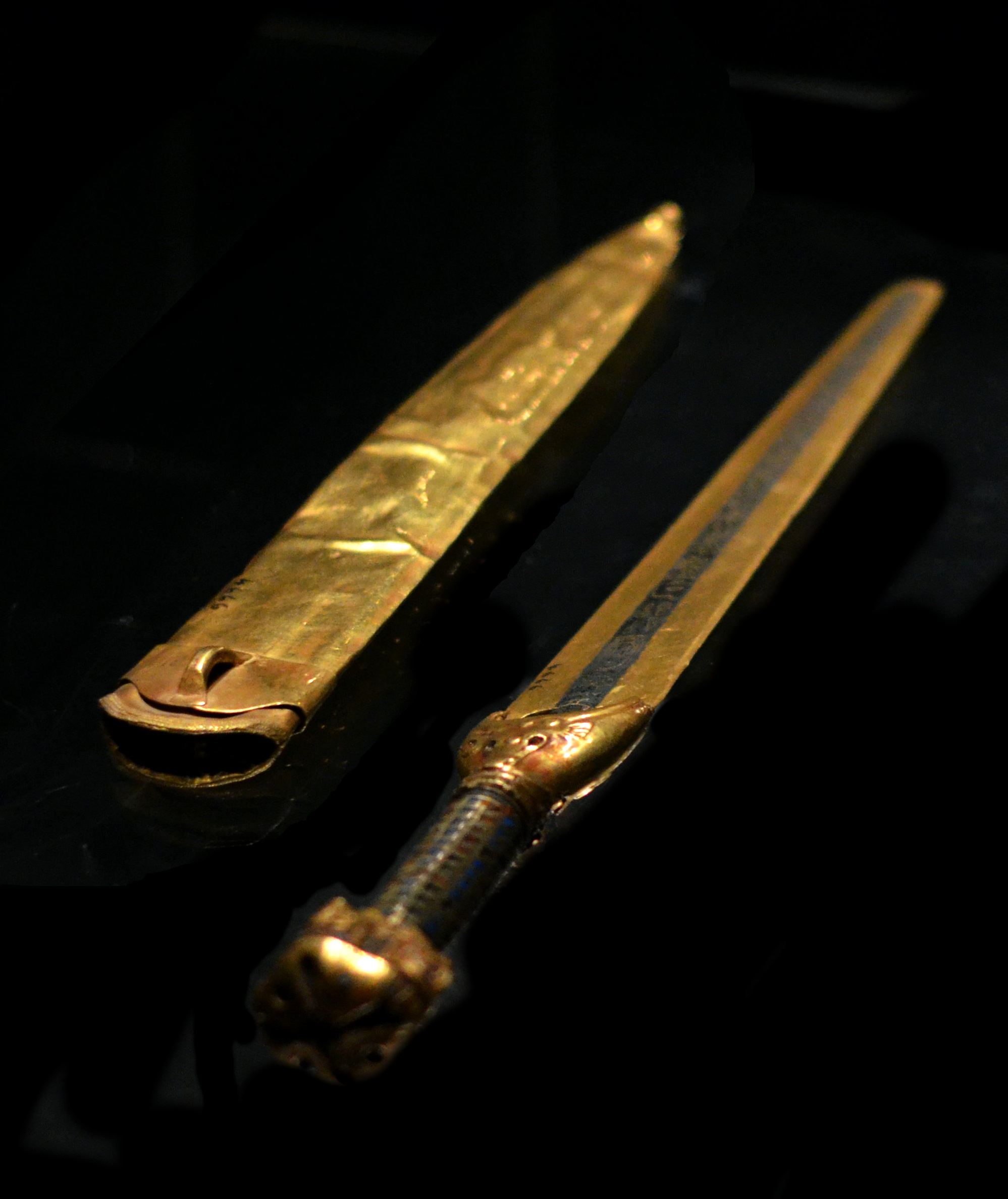
Dagger of Ahmose I, Luxor Museum

There is some dispute as to if this pyramid was Ahmose's burial place, or if it was a cenotaph. Although earlier explorers Mace and Currelly were unable to locate any internal chambers, it is unlikely that a burial chamber would have been located in the midst of the pyramid's rubble core. In the absence of any mention of a tomb of King Ahmose in the tomb robbery accounts of the Abbott Papyrus, and in the absence of any likely candidate for the king's tomb at Thebes, it is possible that the king was interred at Abydos, as suggested by Harvey. Certainly the great number of cult structures located at the base of the pyramid located in recent years, as well as the presence at the base of the pyramid of a cemetery used by priests of Ahmose's cult, argue for the importance of the king's Abydos cult. However, other Egyptologists believe that the pyramid was constructed (like Tetisheri's pyramid at Abydos) as a cenotaph and that Ahmose may have originally been buried in the southern part of Dra' Abu el-Naga' with the rest of the late Seventeenth and early Eighteenth Dynasties.

This pyramid was the last pyramid ever built as part of a mortuary complex in Egypt. The pyramid would be abandoned by subsequent pharaohs of the New Kingdom, for both practical and religious reasons. The Giza plateau offered plenty of room for building pyramids; but this was not the case with the confined, cliff-bound geography of Thebes and any burials in the surrounding desert were vulnerable to flooding. The pyramid form was associated with the sun god Re, who had been overshadowed by Amun in importance. One of the meanings of Amun's name was the hidden one, which meant that it was now theologically permissible to hide the Pharaoh's tomb by fully separating the mortuary template from the actual burial place. This provided the added advantage that the resting place of the pharaoh could be kept hidden from necropolis robbers. All subsequent pharaohs of the New Kingdom would be buried in rock-cut shaft tombs in the Valley of the Kings.

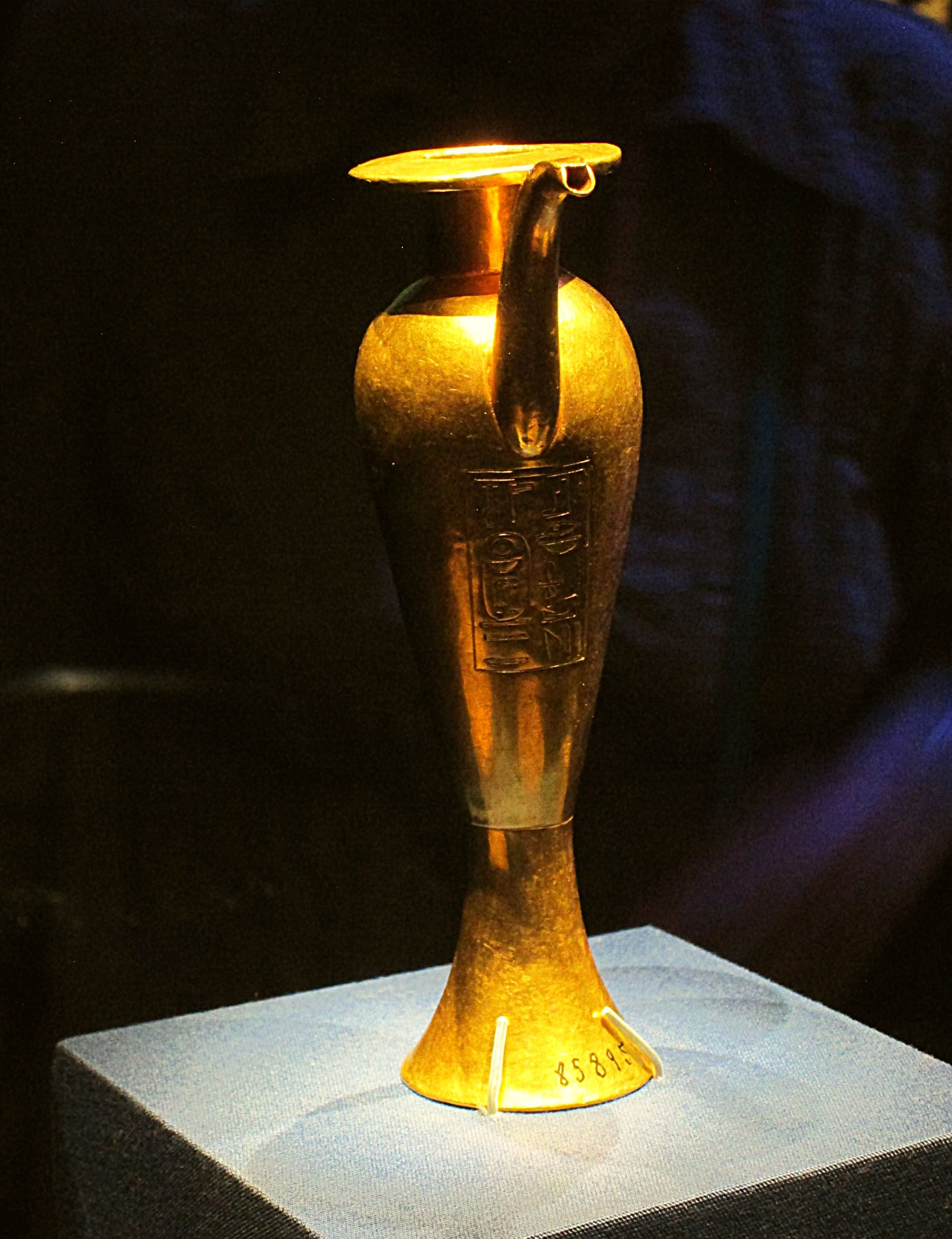
Heset Ewer of Ahmose I

=== Mummy ===
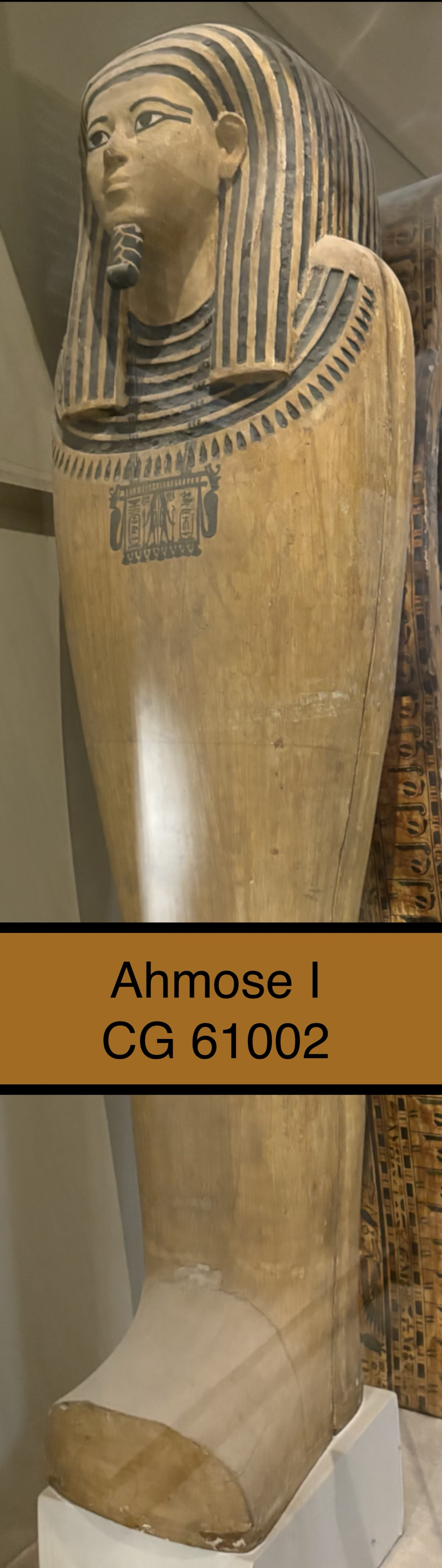
Coffin of Ahmose I

Ahmose I's mummy was discovered in 1881 within the Deir el-Bahri Cache, located in the hills directly above the Mortuary Temple of Hatshepsut. He was interred along with the mummies of other Eighteenth and Nineteenth Dynasty leaders Amenhotep I, Thutmose I, Thutmose II, Thutmose III, Ramesses I, Seti I, Ramesses II and Ramesses IX, as well as the Twenty-first Dynasty pharaohs Pinedjem I, Pinedjem II and Siamun.

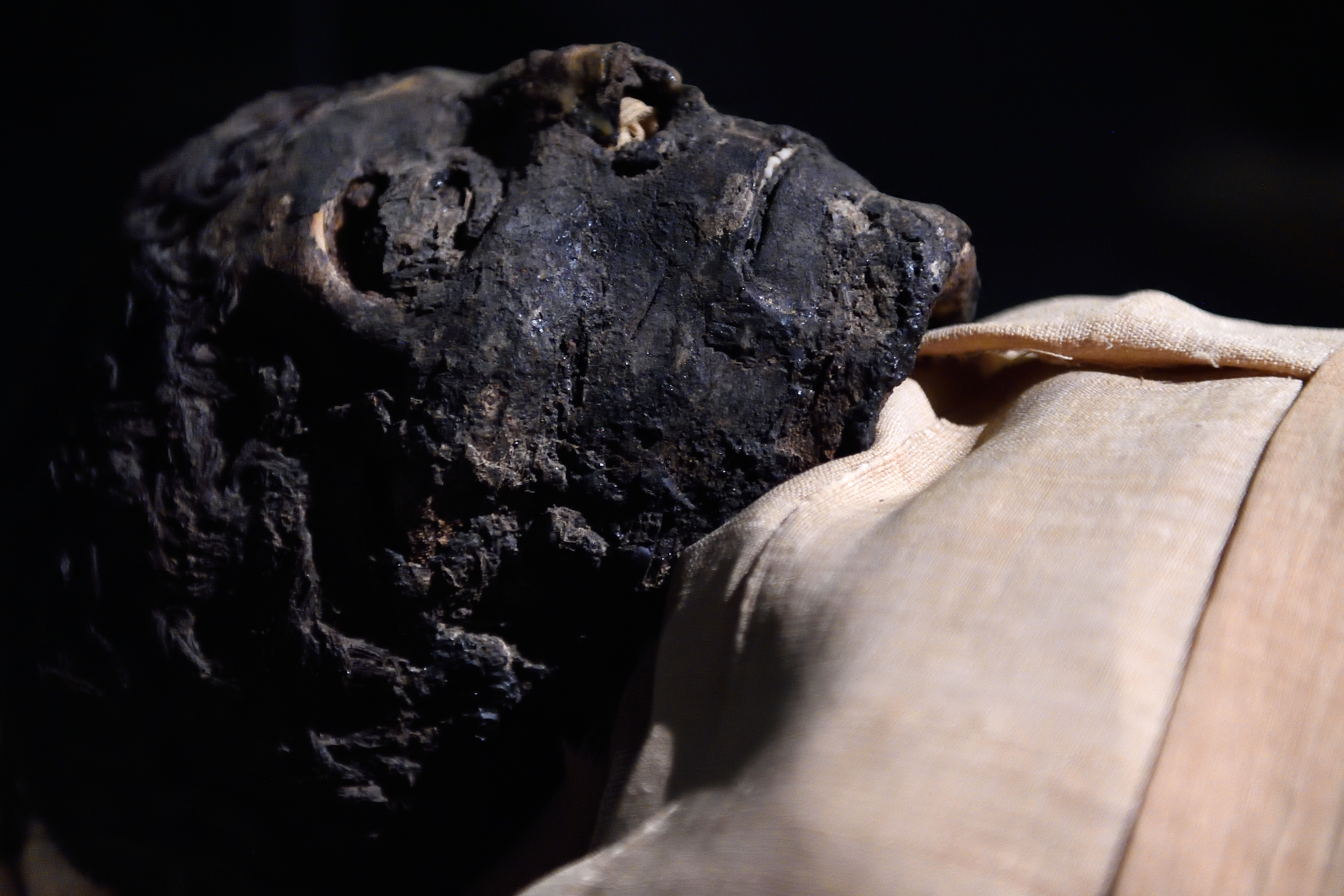
The mummified head of Ahmose I at the Luxor Museum

Ahmose I's mummy was unwrapped by Gaston Maspero on June 9, 1887. It was found within a coffin that bore his name in hieroglyphs, and on his bandages his name was again written in hieratic script. While the cedarwood coffin's style dates it squarely to the time of the Eighteenth Dynasty, it was neither of royal style nor craftsmanship, and any gilding or inlays may have been stripped in antiquity. He had evidently been moved from his original burial place, re-wrapped and placed within the cache at Deir el-Bahri during the reign of the Twenty-first Dynasty priest-king Pinedjem II, whose name also appeared on the mummy's wrappings. Around his neck a garland of Delphinium flowers had been placed. The body bore signs of having been plundered by ancient grave-robbers, his head having been broken off from his body and his nose smashed.

The body was 1.63 m (64 in) in height. The mummy had a small face with no defining features, though he had slightly prominent front teeth; this may have been an inherited family trait, as this feature can be seen in some female mummies of the same family, as well as the mummy of his descendant, Thutmose II.

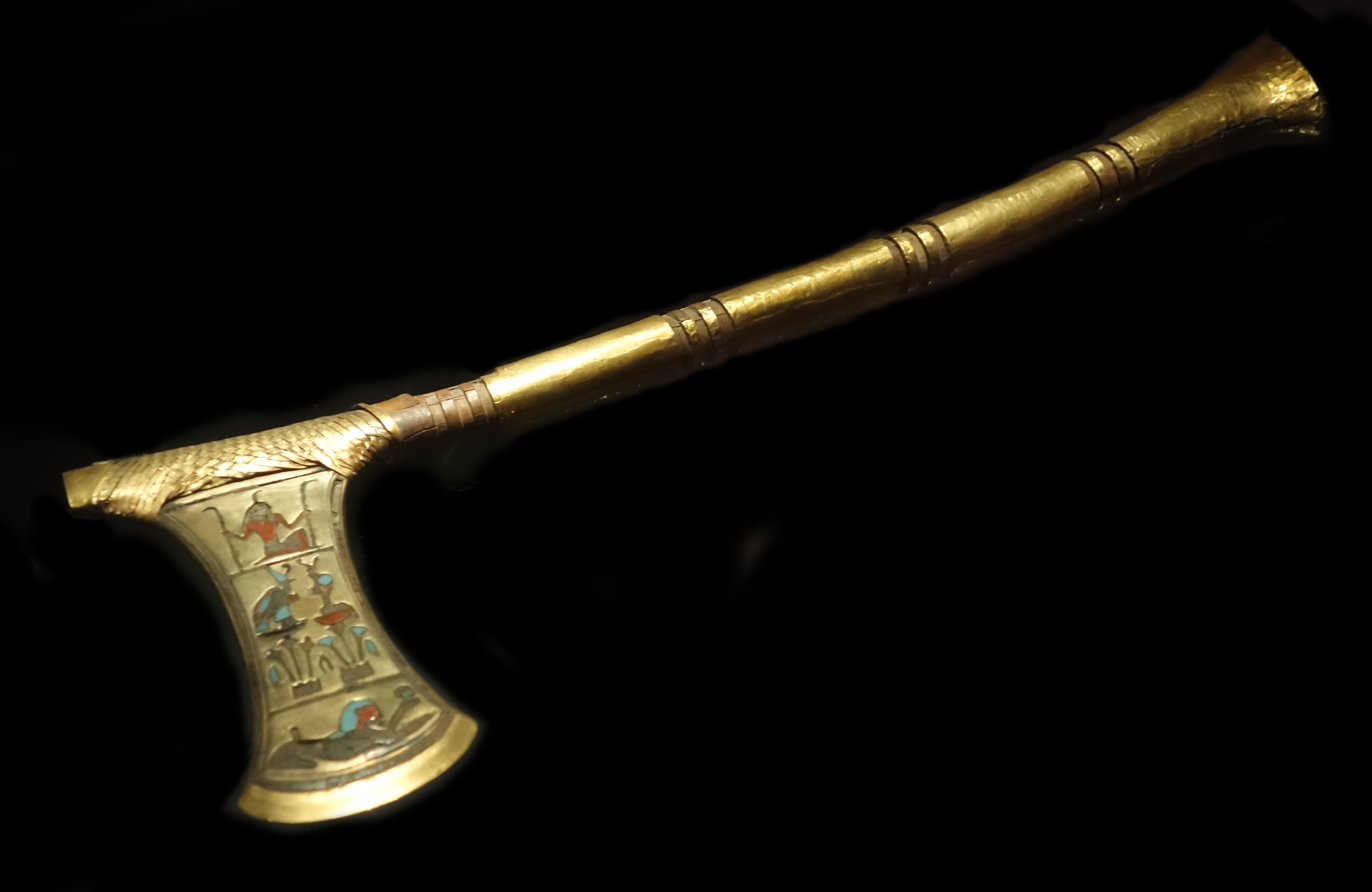
Ceremonial Axe in the name of Ahmose I, found in the tomb of queen Ahhotep II. This axe celebrates the victories of Ahmose. It bears the king's titulary, along with images of the king smiting an Asiatic enemy, and prayers for many years of rule. Eighteenth Dynasty, from Dra Abu el-Naga. CG 52645 / JE4673 Luxor Museum.

A short description of the mummy by Gaston Maspero sheds further light on familial resemblances:

...he was of medium height, as his body when mummified measured only 5 feet 6 inches (1.68 m) in length, but the development of the neck and chest indicates extraordinary strength. The head is small in proportion to the bust, the forehead low and narrow, the cheek-bones project and the hair is thick and wavy. The face exactly resembles that of Tiûâcrai [Seqenenre Tao] and the likeness alone would proclaim the affinity, even if we were ignorant of the close relationship which united these two Pharaohs.

Initial studies of the mummy were first thought to reveal a man in his 50s, but subsequent examinations have shown that he was instead likely to have been in his mid-30s when he died. The identity of this mummy (Cairo Museum catalog n° 61057) was called into question in 1980 by the published results of Dr. James Harris, a professor of orthodontics, and Egyptologist Edward Wente. Harris had been allowed to take x-rays of all of the supposed royal mummies at the Cairo Museum. While history records Ahmose I as being the son or possibly the grandson of Seqenenre Tao, the craniofacial morphology of the two mummies are quite different. It is also different from that of the female mummy identified as Ahmes-Nefertari, thought to be his sister. These inconsistencies, and the fact that this mummy was not posed with arms crossed over chest, as was the fashion of the period for male royal mummies, led them to conclude that this was likely not a royal mummy, leaving the identity of Ahmose I unknown.

The mummy is now in the Luxor Museum alongside the purported one of Ramesses I, as part of a permanent exhibition called "The Golden Age of the Egyptian Military".

=== Succession ===
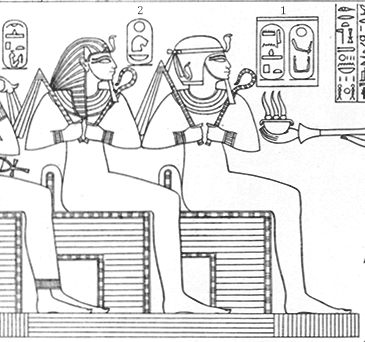
Ahmose I (left) and Amenhotep I as depicted in the Tomb of Inherkhau

Ahmose I was succeeded by his son, Amenhotep I. A minority of scholars have argued that Ahmose had a short co-regency with Amenhotep, potentially lasting up to six years. If there was a co-regency, Amenhotep could not have been made king before Ahmose's 18th regnal year, the earliest year in which Ahmose-ankh, the heir apparent, could have died. There is circumstantial evidence indicating a co-regency may have occurred, although definitive evidence is lacking.

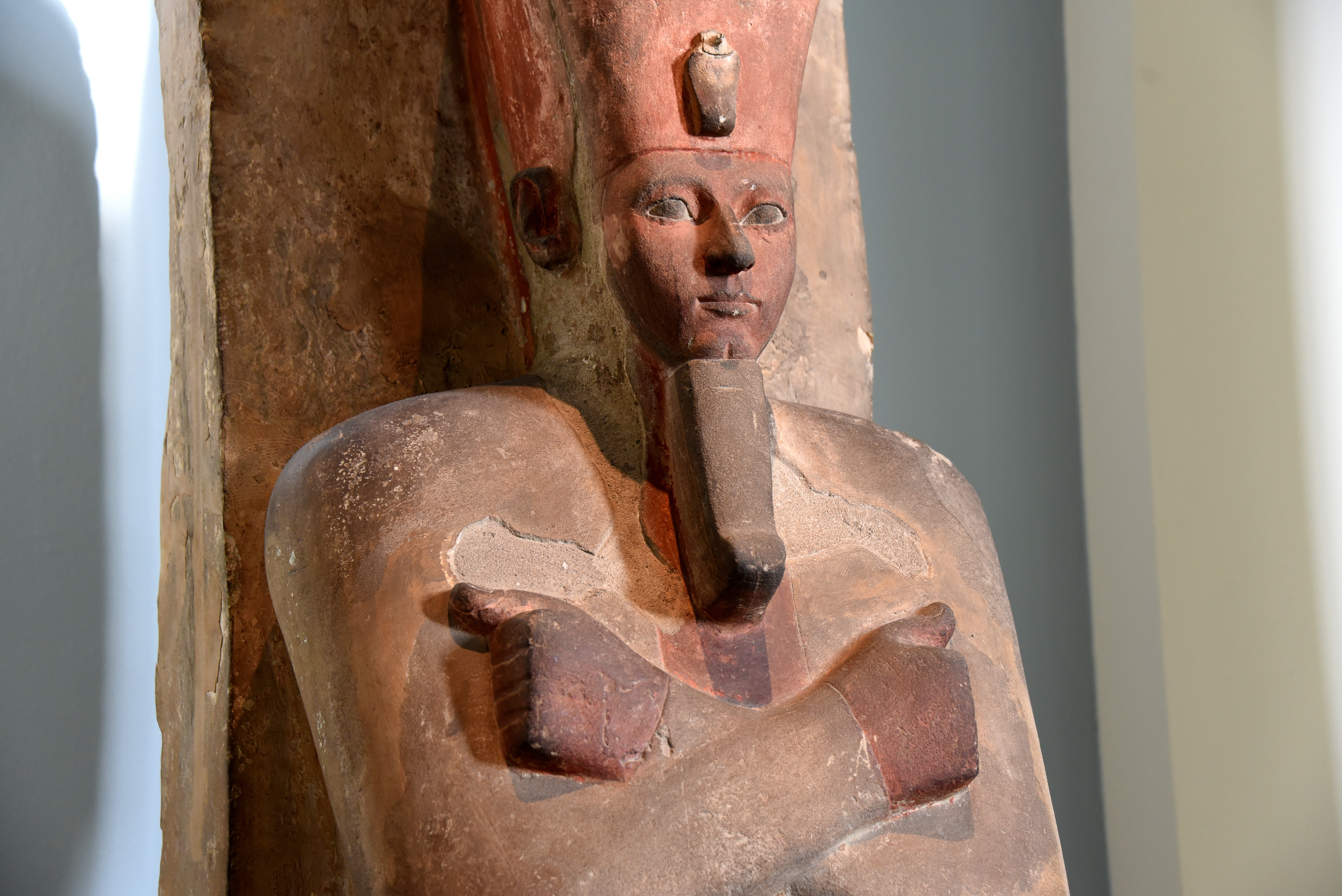
Osiride statue of Amenhotep I, currently housed in the British Museum

The first piece of evidence consists of three small objects which contain both of their praenomen next to one another: the aforementioned small glass bead, a small feldspar amulet and a broken stele, all of which are written in the proper style for the early Eighteenth Dynasty. The last stele said that Amenhotep was "given life eternally", which is an Egyptian idiom meaning that a king is alive, but the name of Ahmose does not have the usual epithet "true of voice" which is given to dead kings. Since praenomen are only assumed upon taking the throne, and assuming that both were in fact alive at the same time, it is indicated that both were reigning at the same time. There is, however, the possibility that Amenhotep I merely wished to associate himself with his beloved father, who reunited Egypt.

Second, Amenhotep I appears to have nearly finished preparations for a Sed festival, or even begun celebrating it; but Amenhotep I's reign is usually given only 21 years and a Sed festival traditionally cannot be celebrated any earlier than a ruler's 30th year. If Amenhotep I had a significant co-regency with his father, some have argued that he planned to celebrate his Sed festival on the date he was first crowned instead of the date that he began ruling alone. This would better explain the degree of completion of his Sed festival preparations at Karnak. There are two contemporary New Kingdom examples of the breaking of this tradition; Hatshepsut celebrated her Heb Sed festival in her 16th year and Akhenaten celebrated a Sed festival near the beginning of his 17-year reign.

Third, Ahmose's wife, Ahmose Nefertari, was called both "King's Great Wife" and "King's Mother" in two stelae which were set up at the limestone quarries of Ma'sara in Ahmose's 22nd year. For her to literally be a "King's Mother," Amenhotep would already have to be a king. It is possible that the title was only honorific, as Ahhotep II assumed the title without being the mother of any known king; though there is a possibility that her son Amenemhat was made Amenhotep I's co-regent, but preceded him in death.

Because of this uncertainty, a co-regency is currently impossible to prove or disprove. Both Redford's and Murnane's works on the subject are undecided on the grounds that there is too little conclusive evidence either for or against a coregency. Even if there was one, it would have made no difference to the chronology of the period because in this kind of institution Amenhotep would have begun counting his regnal dates from his first year as sole ruler. However, co-regency supporters note that since at least one rebellion had been led against Ahmose during his reign, it would certainly have been logical to crown a successor before one's death to prevent a struggle for the crown.

== Attestations ==
=== Dated objects ===
Objects with the royal name of Ahmose with a regnal date.

- Hannover 1935.200.209 | A limestone stela dated to Year 18 of Ahmose I mentioning his daughter, King's Daughter and God's Wife Satamun.
- el-Masara 6 | rock inscription dated to Year 22 of Ahmose I.
- el-Masara 8 | rock inscription dated to Year 22 of Ahmose I.

=== Undated objects ===
Objects with the royal name of Ahmose without a regnal date.

- Harari, ASAE 56 | a stela with the royal name of Ahmose along with Ahmose-Nefertari and Senior King's Son of his body, Ahmose.
- Simpson, Heka-Nefer, 34 fig. 27, pl. XVIIb | a rock inscription from Armenna East with the royal name of Ahmose along with King's Son Djehuty and King's Son Teti.
- Weigall, Report, 127, pl. LXV (4) | a rock inscription from Toshka with the royal name of Ahmose along with King's Son [Djehuty] and [King's Son] Teti.

== Gallery ==
Fragment of relief depicting Ahmose I and Queen Ahmose-Nefertari, Brooklyn Museum

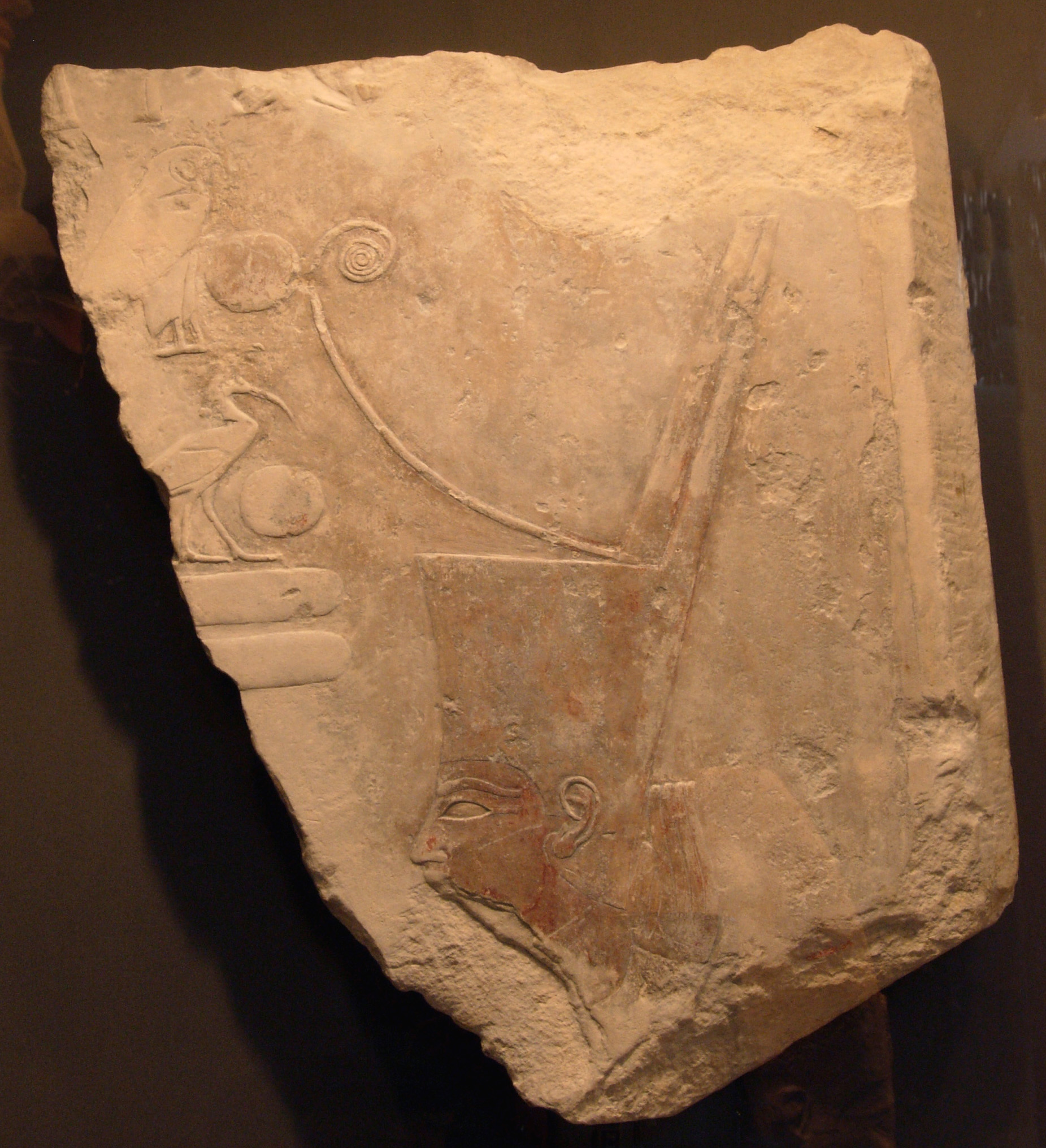
Relief depicting Ahmose I wearing the Deshret, Metropolitan Museum of Art

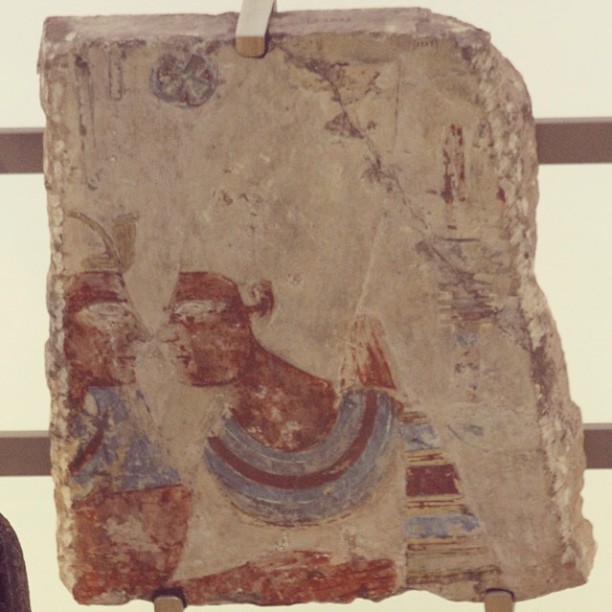
Relief depicting Ahmose I embracing Osiris

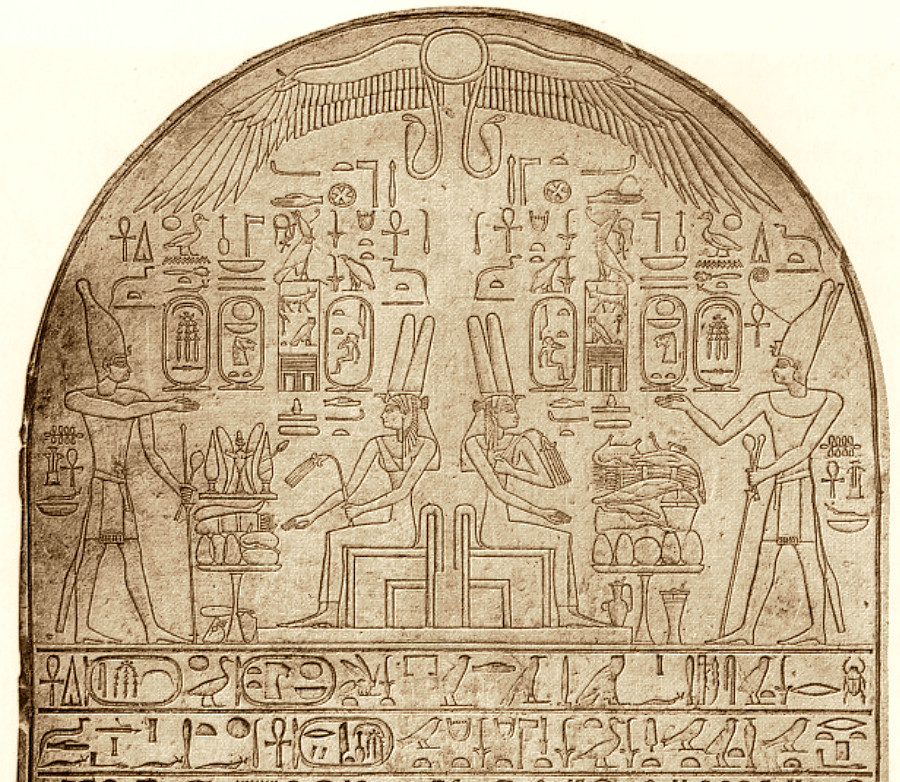
Stela depicting Ahmose I giving offerings to his grandmother Tetisheri

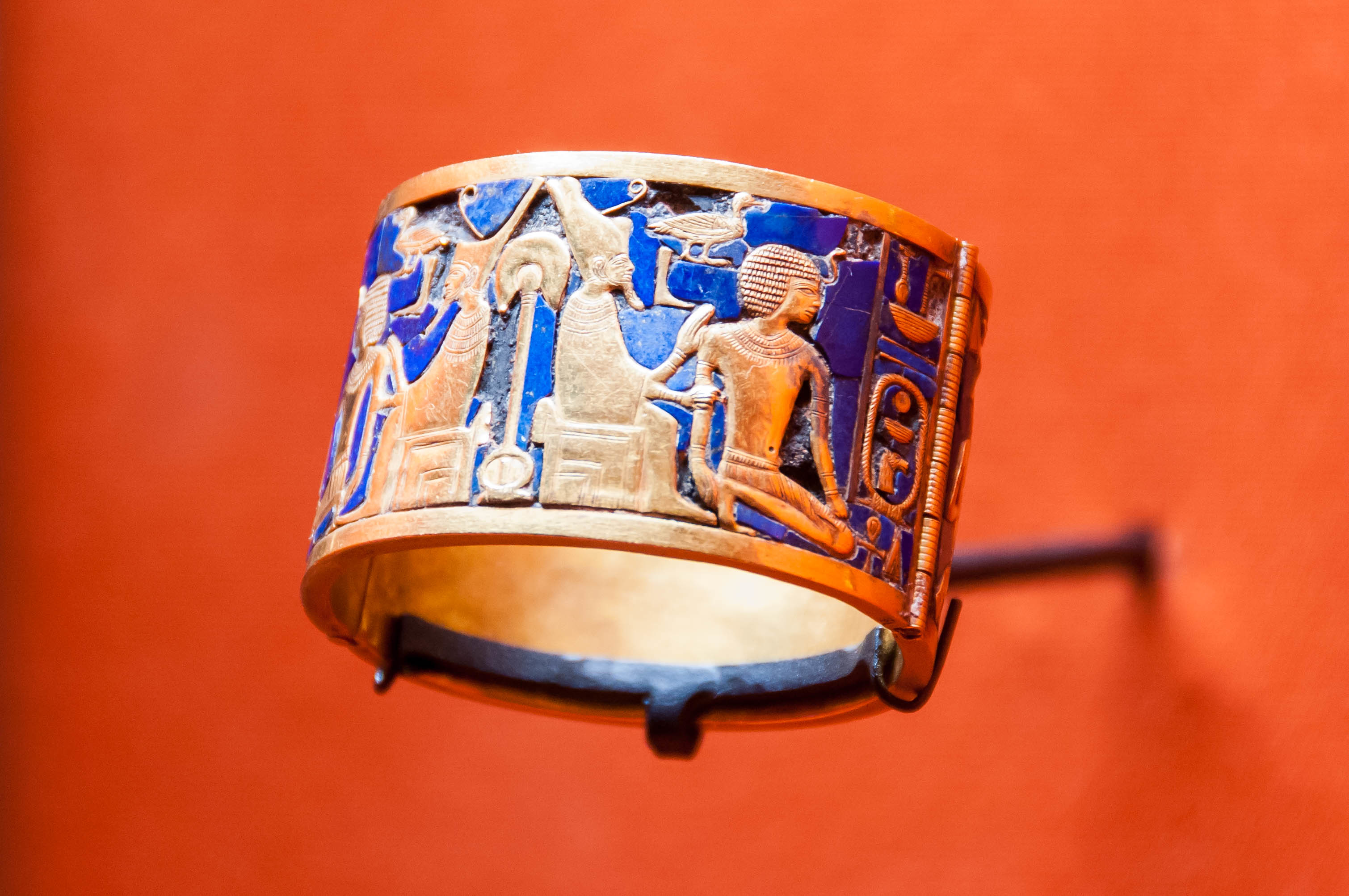
Bracelet of Ahmose I

== See also ==
- List of Pharaohs
