= Ahmose-Meritamun =

Ancient Egyptian Queen

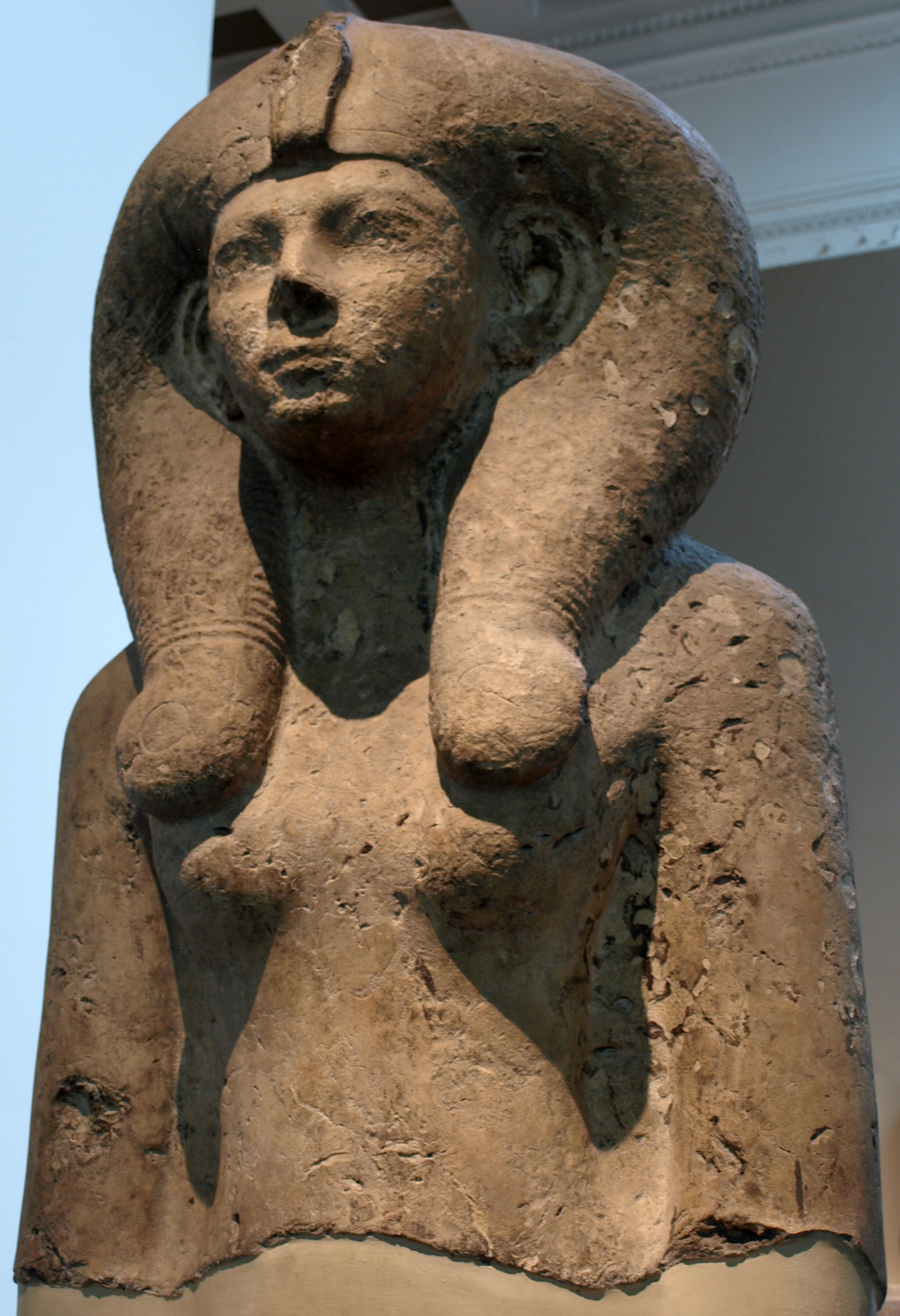
- Fragmentary colossal bust of Ahmose-Meritamon, wearing a wig fashioned after a style associated with Hathor - British Museum
- Burial: TT358 in Thebes
- Spouse: Amenhotep I
- Dynasty: 18th of Egypt
- Father: Ahmose I
- Mother: Ahmose-Nefertari
- Religion: Ancient Egyptian religion

Ahmose-Meritamun in hieroglyphs
iaH ms i mn n mr i i t
Ahmose Meritamun
Child of Iah, Beloved of Amun

Ahmose-Meritamun (or Ahmose-Meritamon) was a Queen of Egypt during the early Eighteenth Dynasty. She was both the older sister and the wife of Pharaoh Amenhotep I. She died fairly young and was buried in tomb TT358 in Deir el-Bahari.

== Biography ==
Ahmose-Meritamun was the royal daughter of Ahmose I and Ahmose Nefertari, and became the Great Royal Wife of her younger brother Amenhotep I, pharaoh of Ancient Egypt in the Eighteenth Dynasty.

Meritamun took over the role of God's Wife of Amun from her mother Ahmose Nefertari. Other titles recorded for Meritamun include: lady of the two lands (nbt-t3wy), (Great) King's Wife (ḥmt-nswt(-wrt)), mistress of the entire two lands (ḥnwt-tꜣwy-tm), god's wife (ḥmt-ntr), united with the white crown (ẖnmt-nfr-ḥḏt), king's daughter (sꜣt-nswt), and king's sister (snt-niswt). The title king's mother (mwt-niswt) is also recorded in later sources, even though she was never the mother of a king.

A limestone statue of this queen was discovered by Giovanni Belzoni while he was working in Karnak in 1817.

Ahmose-Meritamun is depicted in the tomb of Inherkau (TT359) which dates to the 20th Dynasty as one of the "Lords of the West". She is shown in the top row behind Queen Ahhotep I and in front of Queen Sitamun.

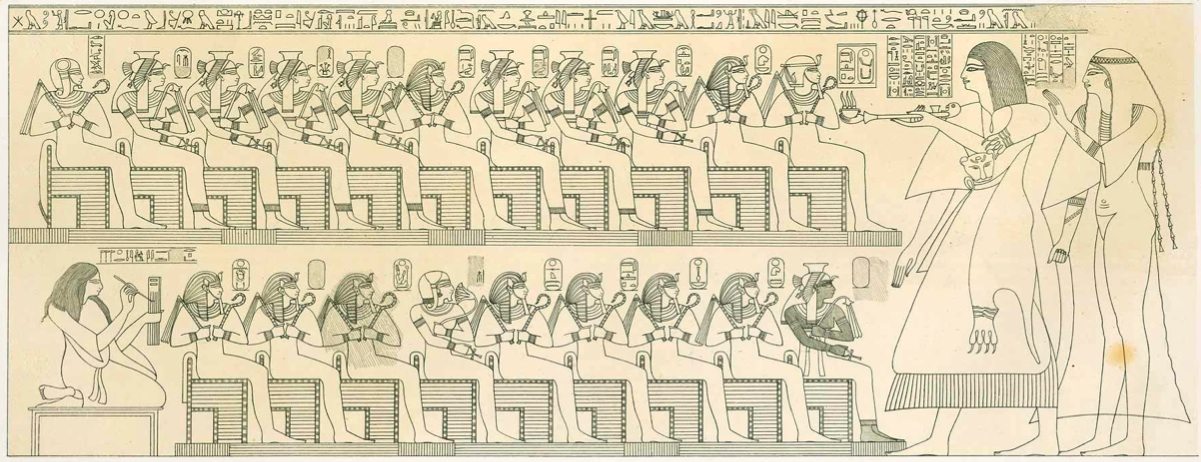
Scene from the tomb of Inherkau dating to the Twentieth dynasty of Egypt. Top row, right to left: Amenhotep I, Ahmose I, Ahhotep I, Ahmose-Meritamun, Sitamun, Siamun?, Ahmose-Henuttamehu, Ahmose-Tumerisy, Ahmose-Nebetta, Ahmose Sapair. Bottom row, right to left: Ahmose-Nefertari, Ramesses I, Mentuhotep II, Amenhotep II, Seqenenre Tao, Ramose?, Ramesses IV, ?, Tuthmosis I.

== Death and burial ==
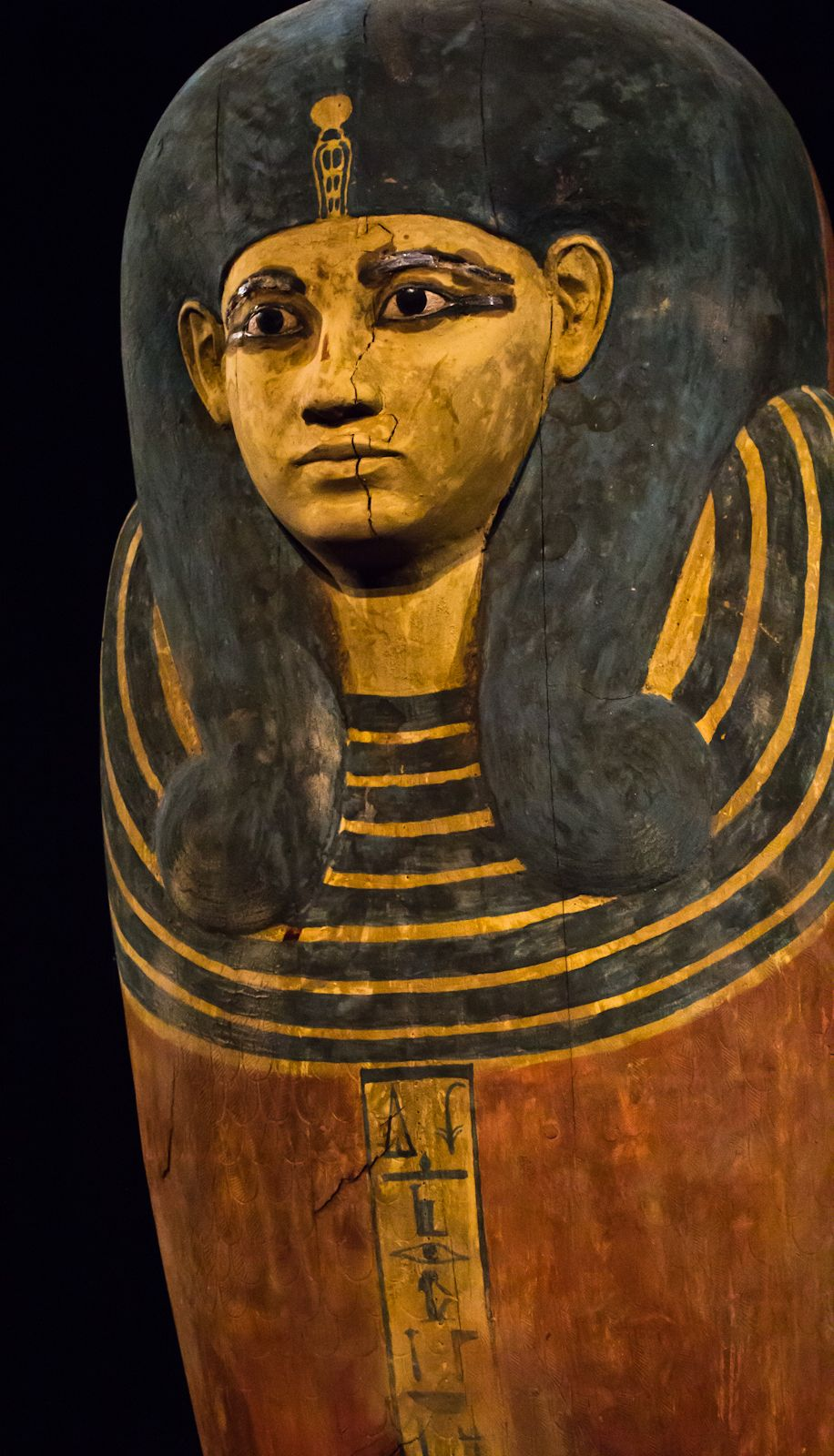
Ahmose-Meritamun's inner coffin.

Her remains were discovered at Deir el-Bahri in TT358 in 1930 by Herbert Eustis Winlock. Her mummy was found in two cedarwood coffins and a cartonage outer case. Her mummy had been rewrapped and reburied by priests who had found her tomb that had been vandalized by robbers. It appears that she died when she was relatively young, with evidence of being afflicted with arthritis and scoliosis.

Mummufied head of Ahmose-Meritamun, following its 1930 unwrapping.

The outer coffin (now in the Egyptian Museum, JE 53140) is over 10 ft in size and is made from cedar planks which are joined and carved to a uniform thickness throughout the coffin. The eyes and eyebrows are inlaid with glass. The body is carefully carved with chevrons painted in blue to create the illusion of feathers. The coffin was covered in gold which had been stripped in antiquity. The inner coffin was smaller, but still over 6 ft tall. The inner coffin had also been covered in gold but stripped of this precious metal. The mummy had been carefully rewrapped during the reign of Pinedjem I. Inscriptions record that the linen used in the reburial was made in year 18 of Pinedjem by the High Priest of Amun Masaharta, son of Pinedjem I. The reburial took place in year 19, month 3 of the winter, day 28.

In April 2021 her mummy was moved from the Museum of Egyptian Antiquities to National Museum of Egyptian Civilization along with those of 3 other queens and 18 kings in an event termed the Pharaohs' Golden Parade.

== See also ==
- Eighteenth dynasty of Egypt Family Tree
