= Siamun (son of Ahmose I) =

Siamun was a prince of ancient Egypt. His name means "Son of Amun".

i mn n G39 Z1
Siamun
in hieroglyphs
Era: New Kingdom
(1550–1069 BC)

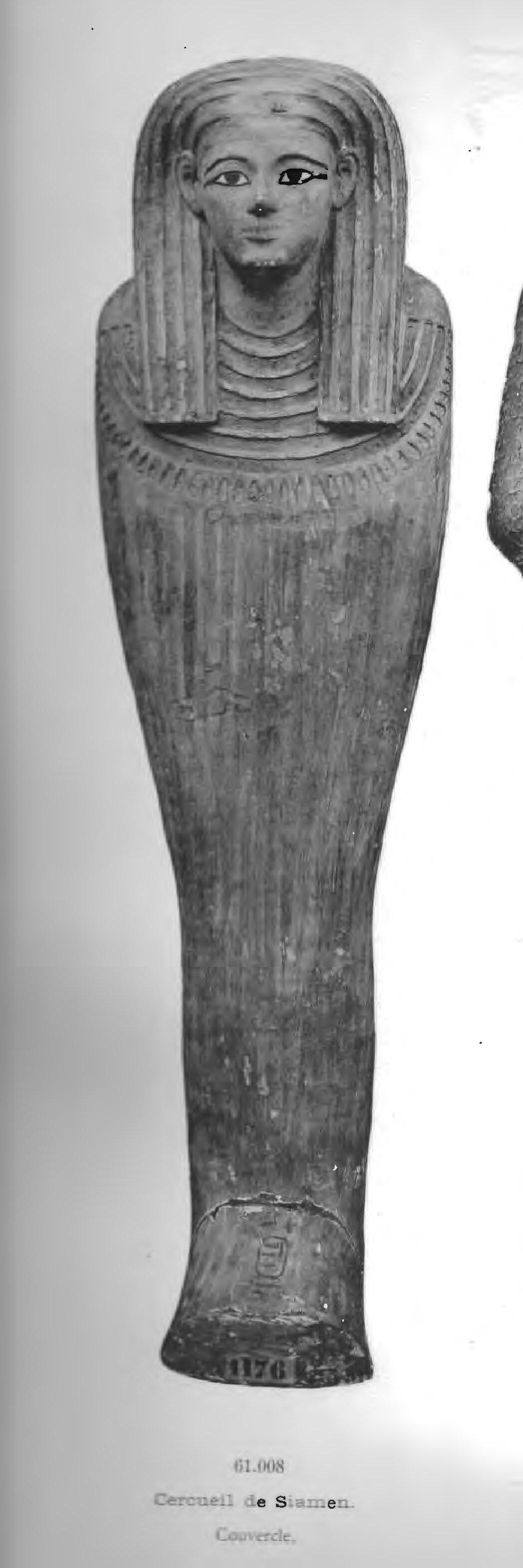
Siamun's coffin

Siamun was a prince during the early Eighteenth Dynasty of Egypt. He was the son of Pharaoh Ahmose I and Queen Ahmose Nefertari. His mummy was found in the Deir el-Bahari cache (DB320) and is now in the Egyptian Museum in Cairo.

== Sources ==
- Aidan Dodson & Dyan Hilton: The Complete Royal Families of Ancient Egypt. Thames & Hudson, 2004, ISBN 0-500-05128-3, p. 129.
