= Ahmose =

< iaH ms s >
Ahmose
in hieroglyphs

Ahmose or Ahmes is an Ancient Egyptian name meaning "The Moon is born" or "Child of the Moon". It was a very popular name in the beginning of the eighteenth dynasty.

The name may refer to:

== Pharaohs ==
- Senakhtenre Ahmose (died c. 1560 or 1558 BC), pharaoh of the seventeenth dynasty of Egypt
- Ahmose I (reigned c. 1550 BC – c. 1525 BC), pharaoh and founder of the eighteenth dynasty of Egypt
- Amasis II (or Ahmose II), (reigned c. 570 BC – c. 526 BC), pharaoh of the twenty-sixth dynasty of Egypt

== Queens ==
- Ahmose-Henuttamehu (fl. c. late-16th century BC), daughter of Seqenenre Tao
- Ahmose Inhapi (or Ahmose-Inhapy) (fl. c. mid-16th century BC), daughter of Pharaoh Senakhtenre Ahmose
- Ahmose-Nefertari (c. 1560 BC – c. 1500 BC), daughter of Seqenenre Tao and Ahhotep I
- Ahmose-Meritamun (or Ahmose-Meritamon), (fl. c. late-16th century BC), daughter of Ahmose I and Ahmose Nefertari
- Ahmose-Sitkamose (or Sitkamose), (fl. c. late-16th century BC), princess and queen; probably daughter of Pharaoh Kamose and wife of Ahmose I
- Ahmose (fl. c. mid-16th century BC), royal queen of Thutmose I, and mother of queen and later, pharaoh, Hatshepsut

== Other royalty ==
- Ahmose (18th dynasty) (fl. c. late 15th century BC), probably a son of Amenhotep II; High Priest of Re
- Ahmose (princess) (fl. c. mid-16th century BC), daughter of pharaoh Tao
- Ahmose-ankh (fl. c. mid-16th century BC), son of Pharaoh Ahmose I and queen Ahmose Nefertari
- Ahmose-Henutemipet (fl. c. late-16th century BC), daughter of Pharaoh Tao and probably Queen Ahhotep I
- Ahmose-Meritamon (17th dynasty) (fl. c. late-16th century BC), probably daughter of Seqenenre Tao
- Ahmose-Nebetta (fl. c. mid-16th century BC), probably daughter of Seqenenre Tao
- Ahmose Sapair (fl. c. mid-16th century BC), probably son of Pharaoh Tao
- Ahmose-Sitamun (or Sitamun), (fl. c. late-16th century BC), daughter of Pharaoh Ahmose I
- Ahmose-Tumerisy (fl. c. mid-16th century BC), probably daughter of pharaoh Tao

== Officials ==
- Ahmose (or Ahmes), (fl. c. mid-17th century BC), an ancient Egyptian scribe who wrote the Rhind Mathematical Papyrus, a work of mathematics
- Ahmose, son of Ebana (fl. c. 1555 BC – c. 1500 BC); served in the Egyptian military
- Ahmose Pen-Nekhebet (fl. c. 1530 BC – c. 1470 BC), an ancient Egyptian official and military commander
- Ahmose, scribe (fl. c. 1354 BC – 1337 BC), owner of Amarna Tomb 3
