= TT359 =

Theban tomb

Coordinates: 25.7275°N 32.6006°E

Theban tomb TT359
- Burial site of Inherkhau
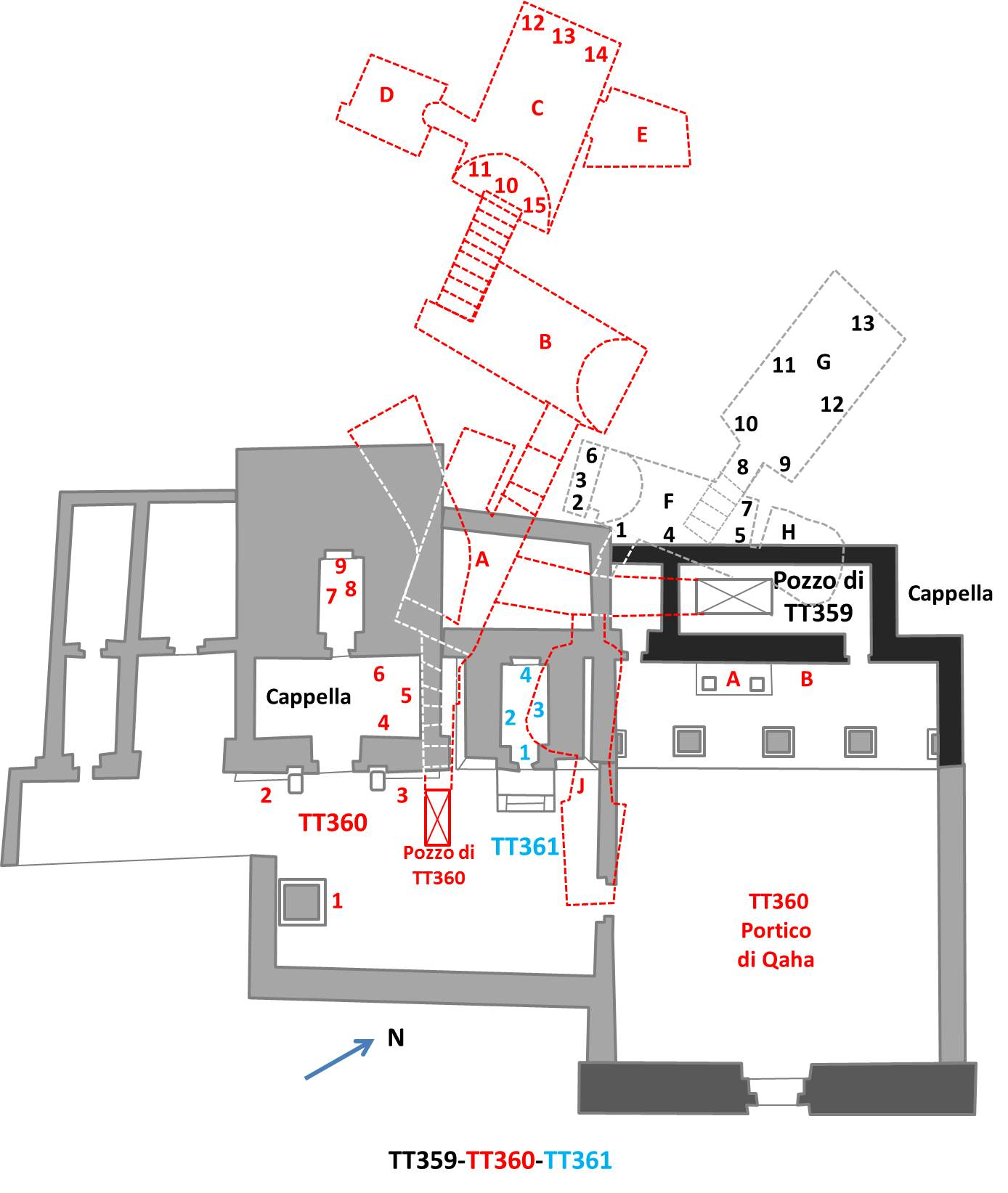
- Location: Deir el-Medina, Theban Necropolis
- ← Previous; TT358 Next → TT360

The Theban Tomb TT359, also referred to as the Tomb of Inherkhau, is located in Deir el-Medina, part of the Theban Necropolis, on the west bank of the Nile, opposite to Luxor. It is the burial place of the ancient Egyptian workman Inherkhau, who was Foreman of the Lord of the Two Lands in the Place of Truth during the reigns of Ramesses III and Ramesses IV during the 20th Dynasty. Inherkhau was also the owner of the Tomb TT299. He was the son of the similarly titled Foreman Huy, and Inherkhau's wife was named Wab.

== Tomb ==
The outer chamber of the tomb contains offering scenes with Inherkau, his wife and their son Kenna. Scenes include depictions of the Book of Gates, the Book of the Dead, and two rows of Kings, Queens and Princes.

In the inner chamber scenes including Inherkau and his son Harmin are included. The chamber also contains a scene at a doorway depicting Ahmose-Nefertari and Amenhotep I (Berlin Museum 2060-1). Other items from the tomb include a lucarne-stela now in the Oriental Institute in Chicago (no. 403) and a coffin likely belonging to Inherkau's wife.

=== King list ===
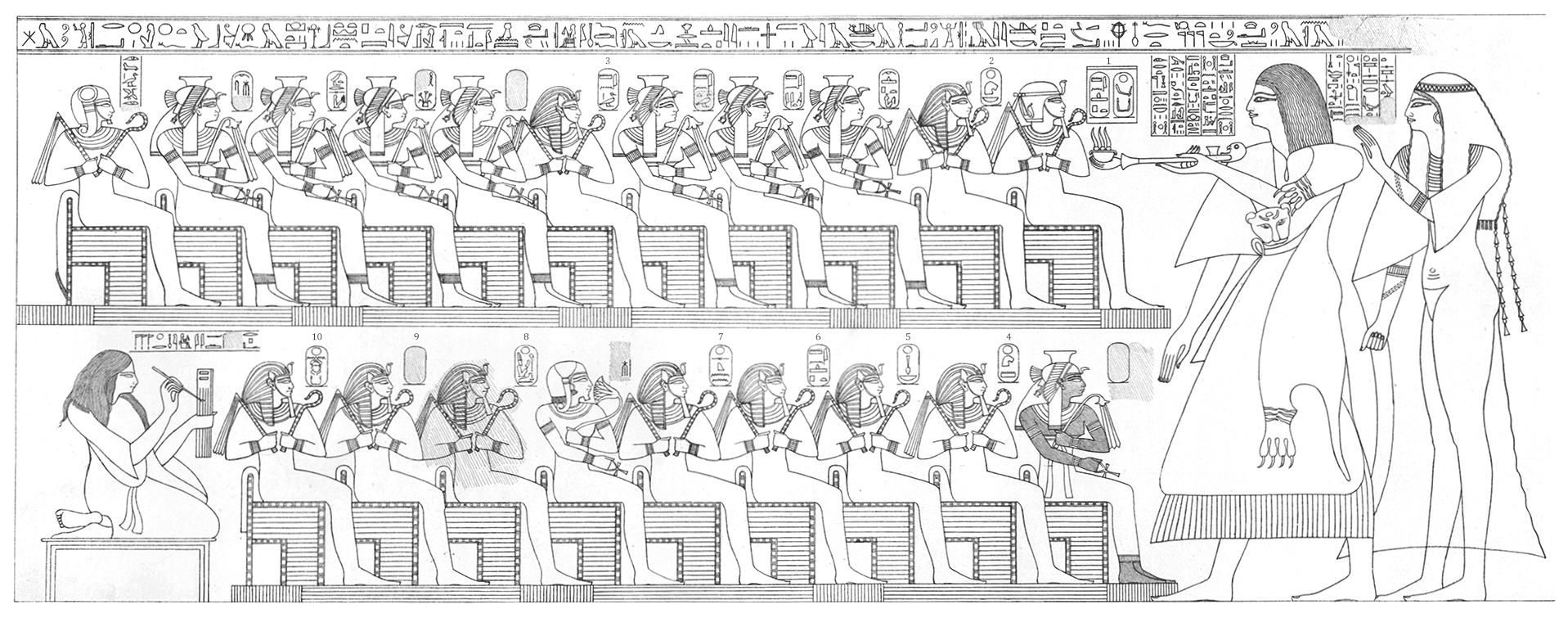
Inherkau and his wife before the Lords of the West, Denkmäler. Top row, right to left: Amenhotep I, Ahmose I, Ahhotep I, Ahmose-Meritamun, Sitamun, Siamun, ?, Ahmose-Henuttamehu, Ahmose-Tumerisy, Ahmose-Nebetta, Ahmose Sapair; Bottom row, right to left: Ahmose-Nefertari, Ramesses I, Mentuhotep II, Amenhotep II, Seqenenre Tao, Ramose?, Ramesses IV, ?, Thutmose I.

== Gallery ==
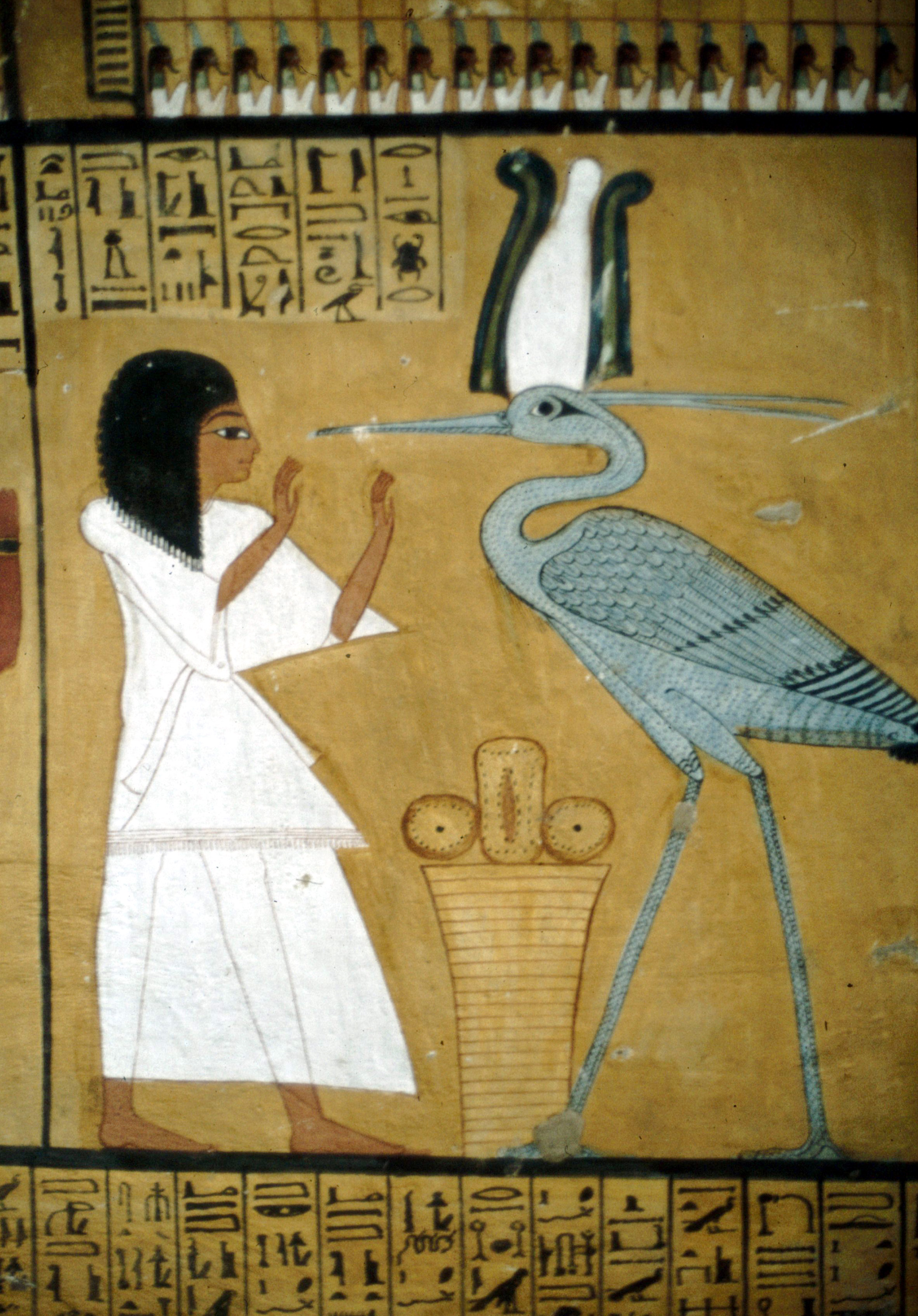
Inherkhau standing near Bennu

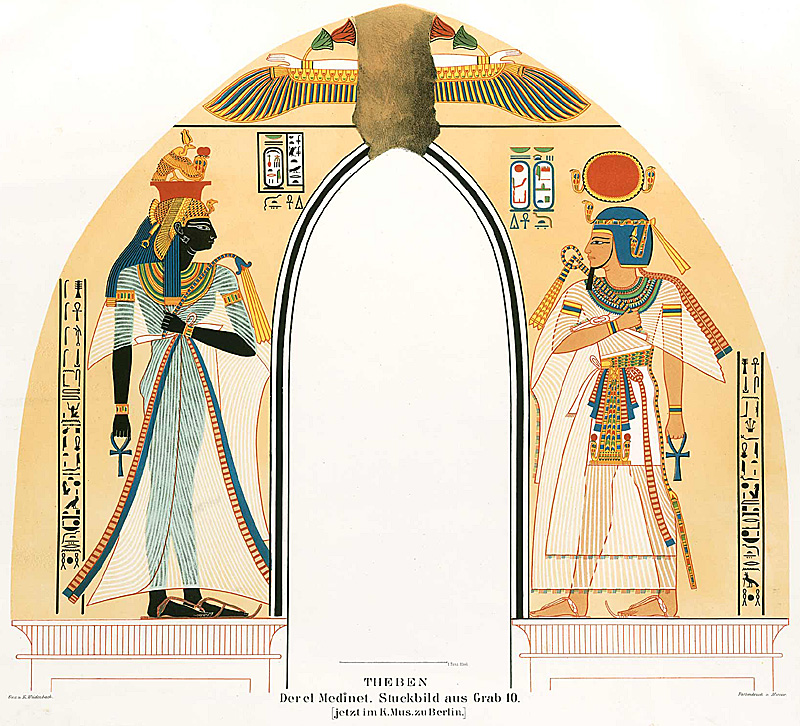
Doorway from TT 359 depicting Ahmose-Nefertari and Amenhotep I

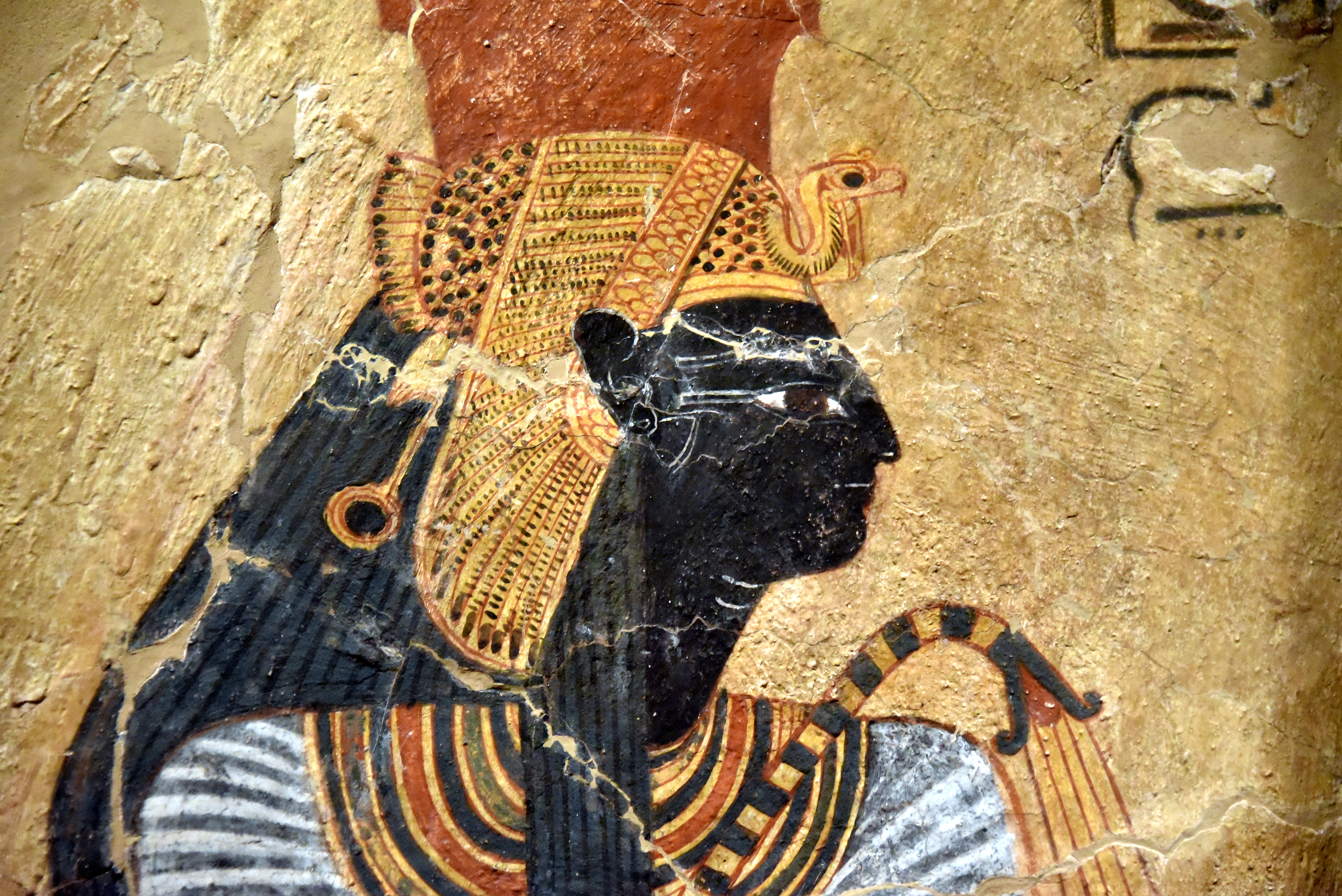
Representation of the deified queen Ahmose-Nefertari. From Tomb TT359, Neues Museum, Berlin

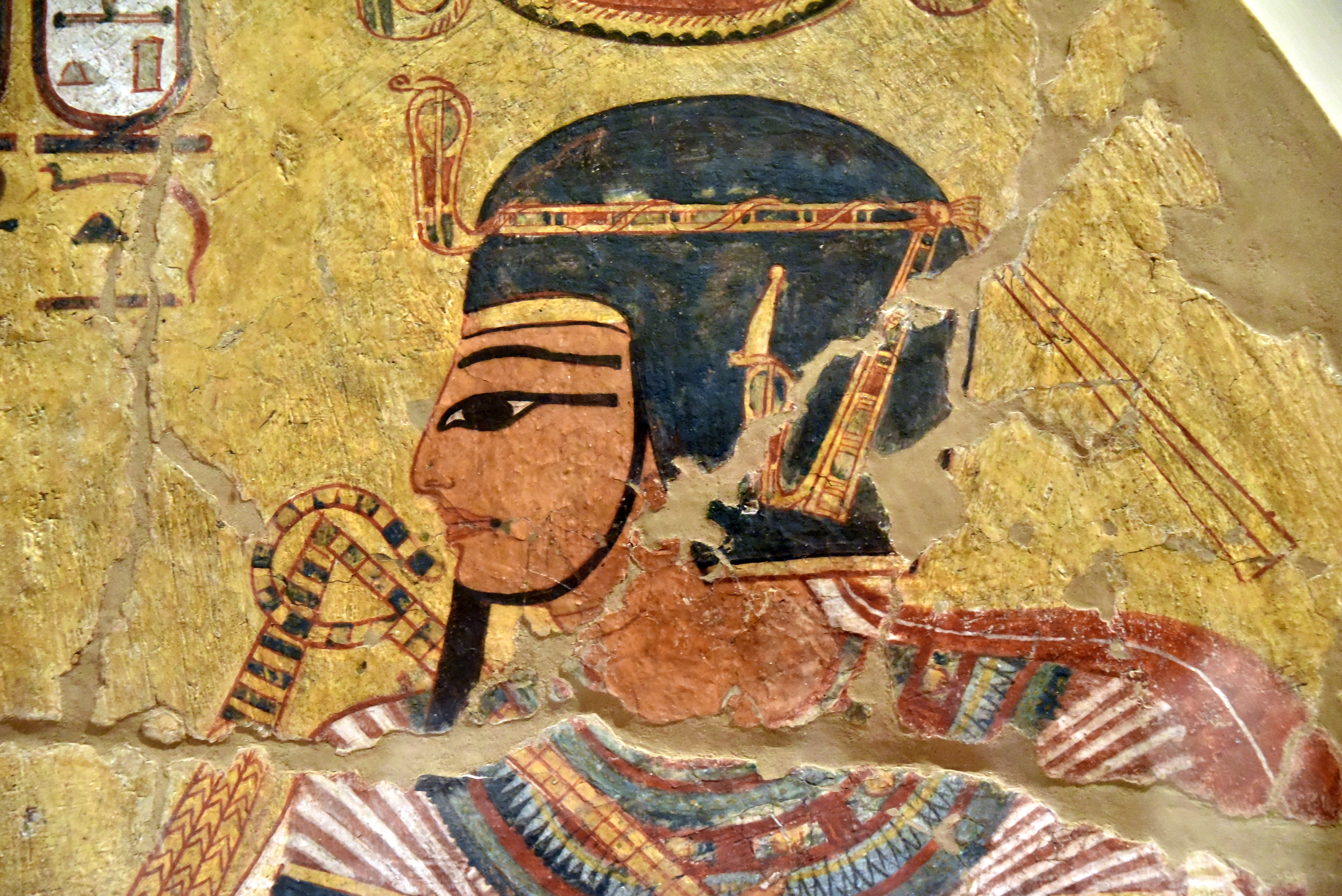
Representation of the deified Amenhotep I. From Tomb TT359, Neues Museum, Berlin

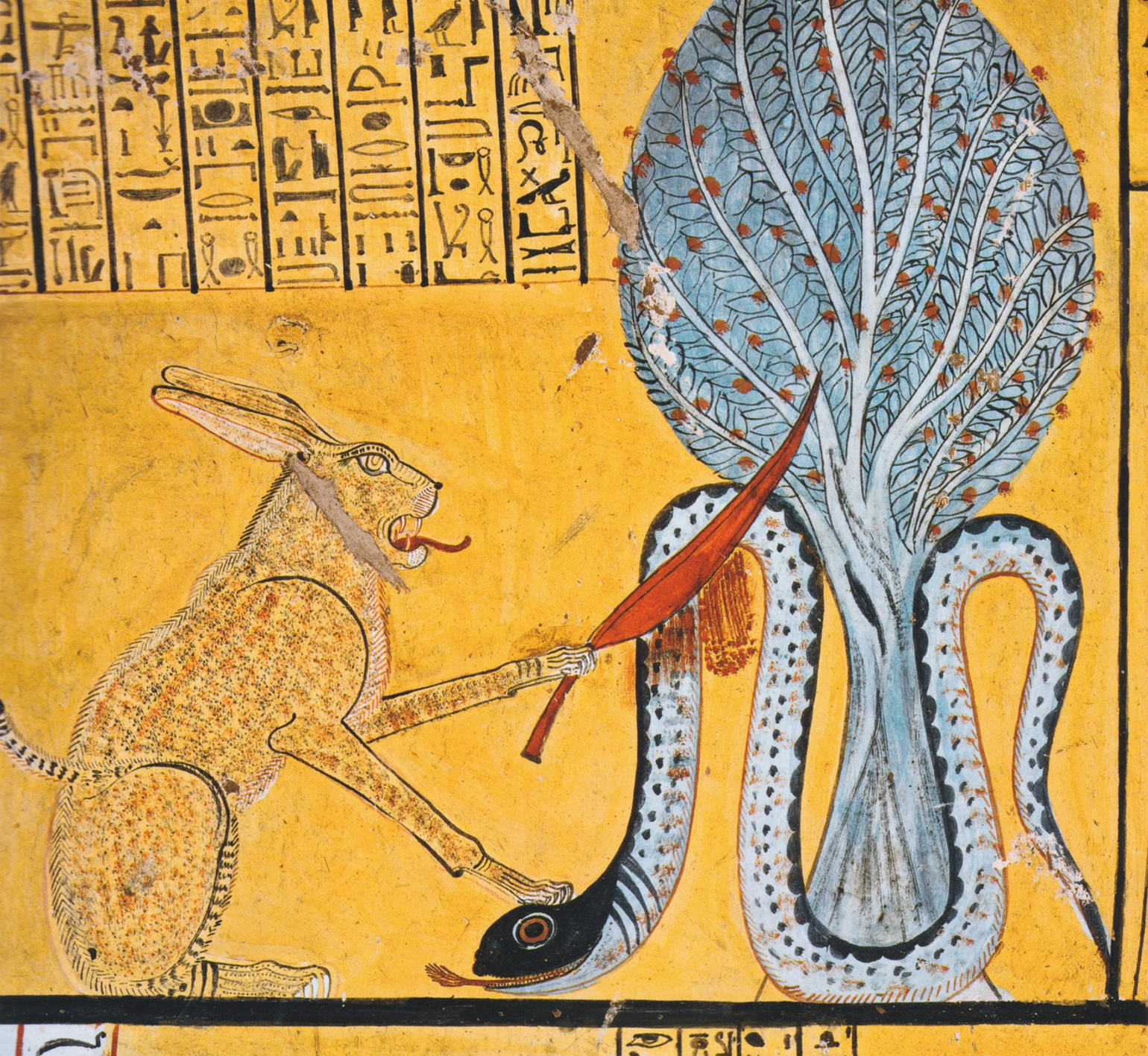
Ra as a cat killing Apophis

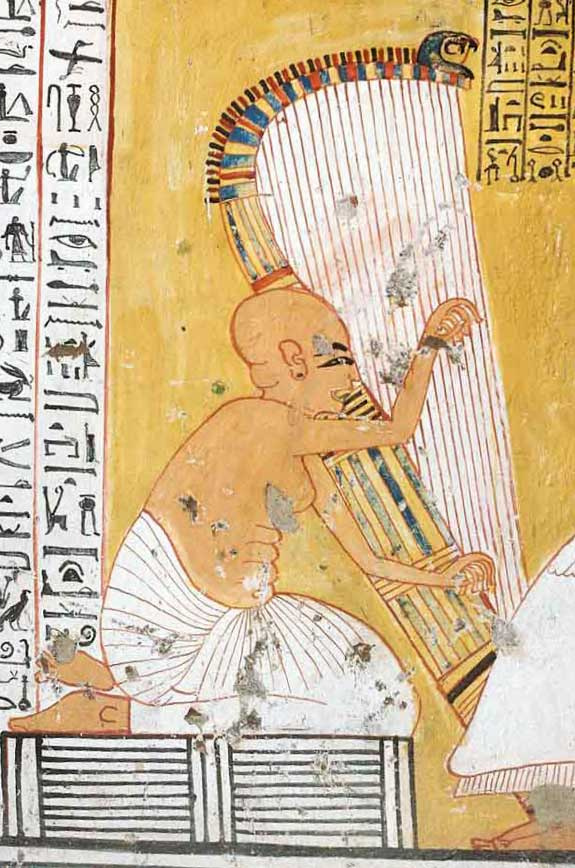
Harpist from the Tomb of Inherkhau

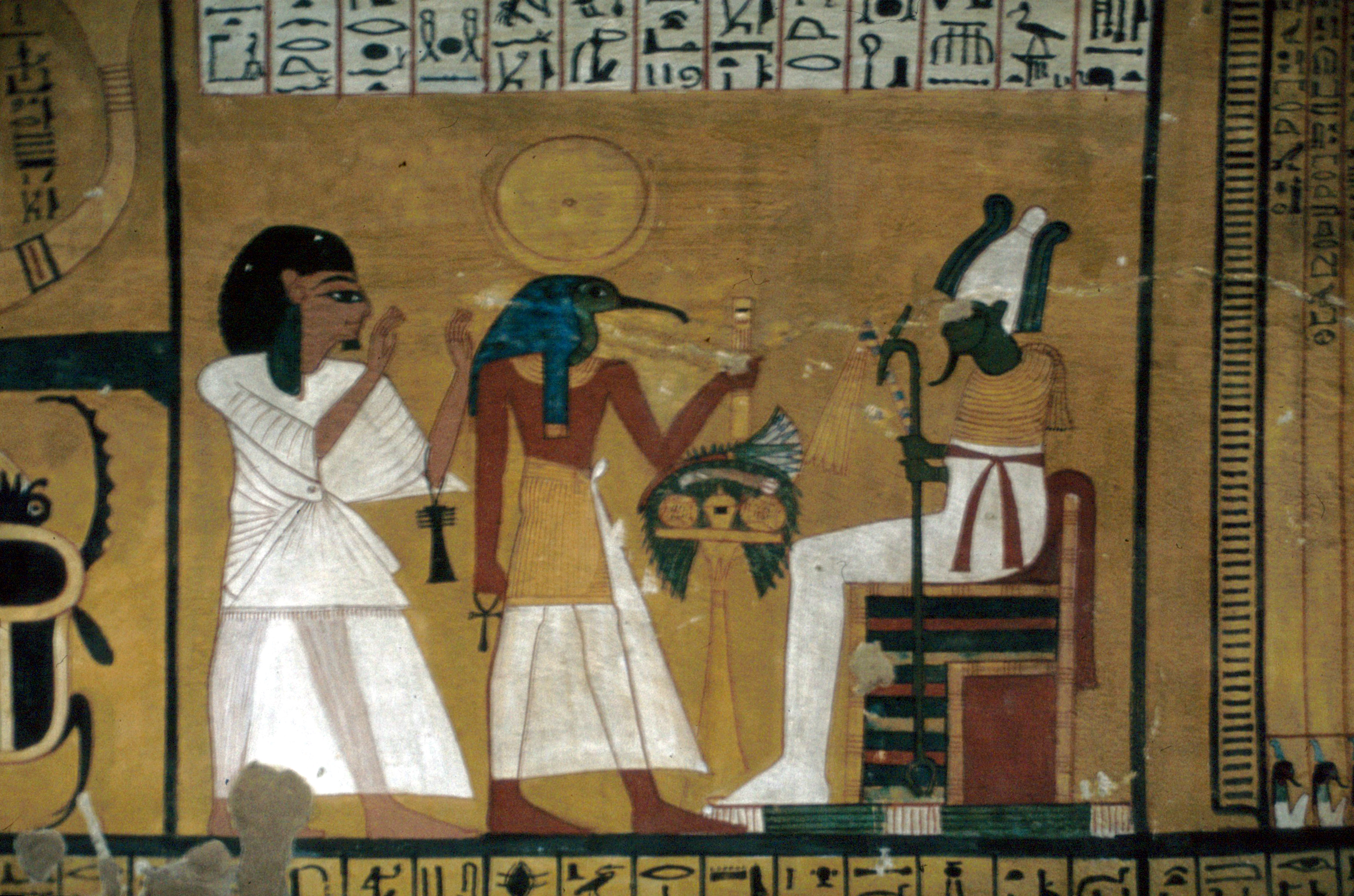
Inherkhau walks towards Osiris with Thoth as his escort

== See also ==
- List of Theban tombs
