= Ahmose-Nebetta =

Ancient Egyptian princess

- King's Daughter; King's Sister
Egyptian name
< iaH ms s nb t tA >
Jꜥḥms-NbtꜢ
- Dynasty: Seventeenth Dynasty; Eighteenth Dynasty
- Father: Seqenenre Tao?
- Mother: Ahhotep I

Ahmose-Nebetta (or Ahmose-Nebta) was an Egyptian princess during the late Seventeenth Dynasty of Egypt in the late Second Intermediate Period. She was probably the daughter of Seqenenre Tao and Queen Ahhotep I. She was the sister of Pharaoh Ahmose I of who was the founder of the Eighteenth Dynasty.

== Life ==
Ahmose-Nebetta (Ancient Egyptian: Jꜥḥms-NbtꜢ “Child of Iah (the Moon) - Lady of the Land”) was likely a daughter of Seqenenre Tao. She may have married her brother Ahmose I, but her sister Ahmose-Nefertari was the Great Royal Wife.

== Attestations ==
Her titles include King's Daughter and King's Sister. Her main attestation is an early Eighteenth Dynasty statue of a princess at the Louvre (N 496) which identifies her as a king's daughter, as a king's sister and as the daughter of Queen Ahhotep I. On this statue their names are written within a cartouche.

=== Louvre E 15682 (weak) ===
A statue of a young seated man identified as Senior King's Son (sꜣ-nsw smsw) Ahmose, with the royal name of Seqenenre (nomen on the back and front left side), also mentions Great King's Daughter (sꜣt-nsw wrt) Ahmose. It may refer to Ahmose-Nebetta, but is missing the name-element Nebetta and has a different title. Her name is not in a cartouche. This statue names another princess named Ahmose, the other might represent Ahmose-Nefertari.

=== Non-Contemporary Attestations ===
Ahmose-Nebetta is depicted in the tomb of Inherkau (TT359) which dates to the 20th Dynasty as one of the "Lords of the West". She is shown in the top row behind Ahmose-Tumerisy and in front of Ahmose Sapair.

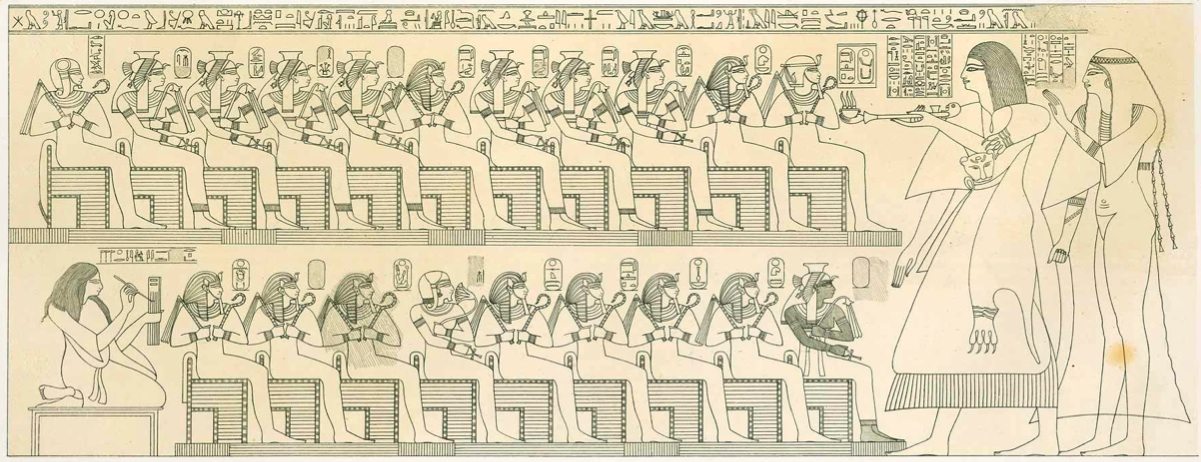
Scene from the tomb of Inherkau dating to the Twentieth dynasty of Egypt. Top row, right to left: Amenhotep I, Ahmose I, Ahhotep I, Ahmose-Meritamun, Sitamun, Siamun?, Ahmose-Henuttamehu, Ahmose-Tumerisy, Ahmose-Nebetta, Ahmose Sapair. Bottom row, right to left: Ahmose-Nefertari, Ramesses I, Mentuhotep II, Amenhotep II, Seqenenre Tao, Ramose?, Ramesses IV, ?, Tuthmosis I.
