= Ahmose-Tumerisy =

Ancient Egyptian princess

Egyptian name
< iaH ms s t w r O34 B7 >
- Dynasty: 17th Dynasty
- Father: Seqenenre Tao

Ahmose-Tumerisy was an ancient Egyptian princess of the late 17th Dynasty. Since her titles were "King's Daughter" and "King's Sister", it is likely that she was a daughter of pharaoh Seqenenre Tao and a sister of pharaoh Ahmose I. Her name is known from her coffin, which is now in the Hermitage Museum. Her mummy was found in the pit MMA 1019 in Sheikh Abd el-Qurna.

== Attestation ==
Ahmose-Tumerisy is depicted in the tomb of Inherkau (TT359) which dates to the 20th Dynasty. The tomb scene depitcs Inherkau and his wife before the "Lords of the West". She is shown in the top row between Ahmose-Henuttamehu and Ahmose-Nebetta.

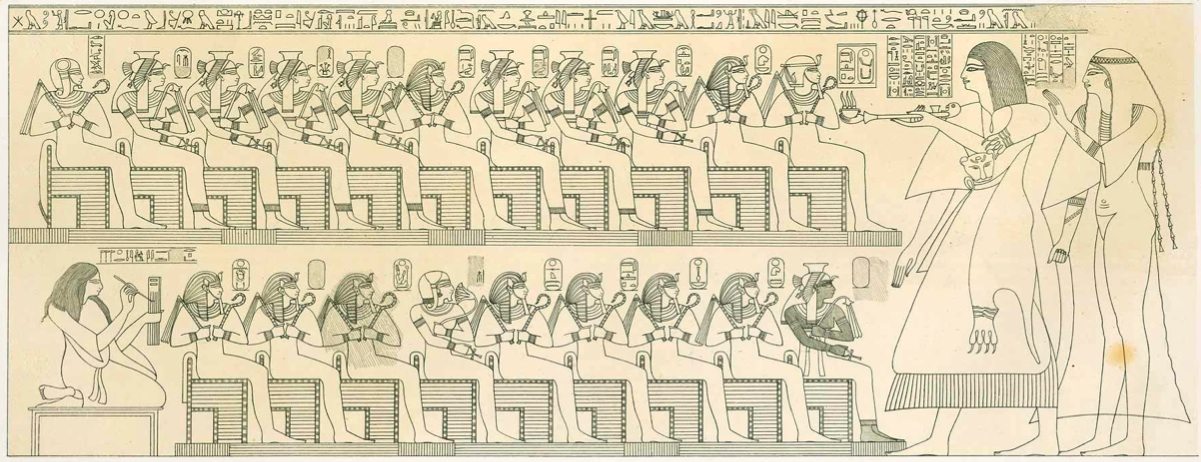
Scene from the tomb of Inherkau dating to the Twentieth dynasty of Egypt. Top row, right to left: Amenhotep I, Ahmose I, Ahhotep I, Ahmose-Meritamun, Sitamun, Siamun?, Ahmose-Henuttamehu, Ahmose-Tumerisy, Ahmose-Nebetta, Ahmose Sapair. Bottom row, right to left: Ahmose-Nefertari, Ramesses I, Mentuhotep II, Amenhotep II, Seqenenre Tao, Ramose?, Ramesses IV, ?, Tuthmosis I.
