= God's Wife =

God's Wife (Egyptian ḥmt nṯr) is a title which was often allocated to royal women during the Eighteenth Dynasty of Egypt. The term indicates an inherited sacral duty, in which the role of "God's Wife" passed from mother to daughter. The role could also exist among siblings, as in the case of the role of "God's Wife" being shared or passed by daughters of Ahmose-Nefertari, Sitamun and her sister, Ahmose-Merytamun.

The role of "God's Wife" is not the same as the title "God's Wife of Amun", which is a separate sacral title, involved in the "Divine Cycle" myth of the deity Amun. Only two Eighteenth Dynasty queens held this title, Ahhotep I and Ahmose-Nefertari.
