= Lady Rai =

Ancient Egyptian nursemaid

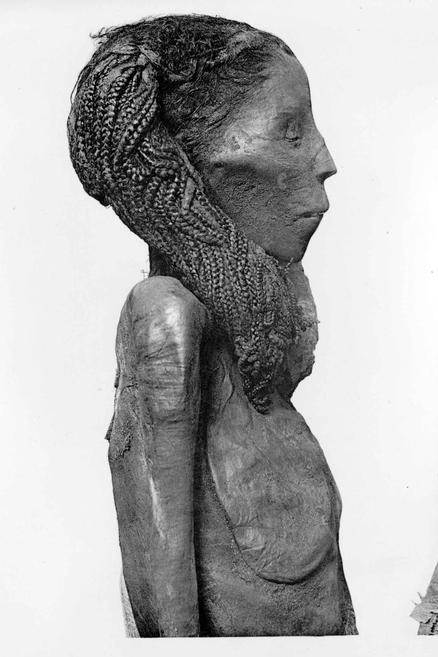
- Side view of Lady Rai's mummy, now in the Egyptian Museum in Cairo
- Born: c. 1565 BC
- Died: 1530 BC (aged c. 35)
- Burial place: Luxor, Luxor Governorate, Egypt

Lady Rai (c. 1570/1560 BC – 1530 BC) was an ancient Egyptian woman of the early 18th Dynasty who served as nursemaid to Queen Ahmose-Nefertari (1562–1495 BC). Her mummified remains were discovered in a Theban tomb in 1881 and it is estimated that she was about 30–40 years old when she died around 1530 BC. The mummy was unwrapped by Grafton Elliot Smith in 1909. He distinguished her mummy as "the most perfect example of embalming that has come down to us from the time of the early 18th Dynasty, or perhaps even of any period". He further characterized her as "the least unlovely" of the existing female mummies, and described as a "slim, gracefully-built woman", measuring 1.510 metres (4 ft 11.4 in) in height, with small "childlike" hands.

In 2009, a CAT scan by a medical team revealed Lady Rai had a diseased aortic arch and is thus the oldest known mummy with evidence of atherosclerosis.

The mummy of Ahmose Inhapy, a princess and queen of the late 17th dynasty of Egypt who was aunt to Ahmose-Nefertari, was found in the outer coffin of Lady Rai.
