= Ahmose Inhapy =

Ancient Egyptian queen consort

Ahmose-Inhapy
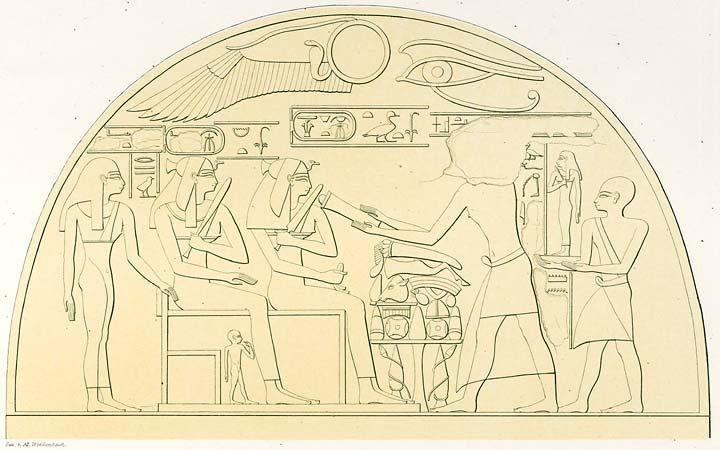
- Ahmose Henuttamehu and another royal lady, possibly Ahmose Inhapi
- Burial: Originally buried in the "k3y ("high place") of Inhapy", location unknown; body relocated to DB320
- Spouse: Seqenenre Tao ?
- Issue: Ahmose-Henuttamehu
Egyptian name
iaH ms ini H a p Z4 N36
Jꜥḥ ms Jnḥꜥpj
- Dynasty: 17th of Egypt; 18th of Egypt
- Father: Senakhtenre Ahmose ?

Ahmose-Inhapy or Ahmose-Inhapi (referred to as Anhapou by Maspero) was a princess and queen of the late 17th Dynasty and early 18th Dynasty.

== Life ==
=== Family ===
She was probably a daughter of Pharaoh Senakhtenre and was sister to Pharaoh Seqenenre Tao, and the queens Ahhotep and Sitdjehuti. She probably married Seqenenre Tao, but it is possible she dates to the later time of Ahmose I (or even Amenhotep I).

She had a daughter named Ahmose-Henuttamehu. Ahmose Inhapy was mentioned in a copy of the Book of the Dead owned by her daughter Ahmose-Henuttamehu, and in the tomb of Amenemhat (TT53). Her titles were: King's Wife and King's Daughter.

== Death ==
=== Tomb ===
A tomb was made for Inhapy in Thebes, referred to in dockets on mummies that were reburied there during the whm-mswt as the "k3y ("high place") of Inhapy"; her mummy was later reburied in DB320 where it was discovered in 1881 and is now in the Egyptian Museum in Cairo.

=== Mummy ===
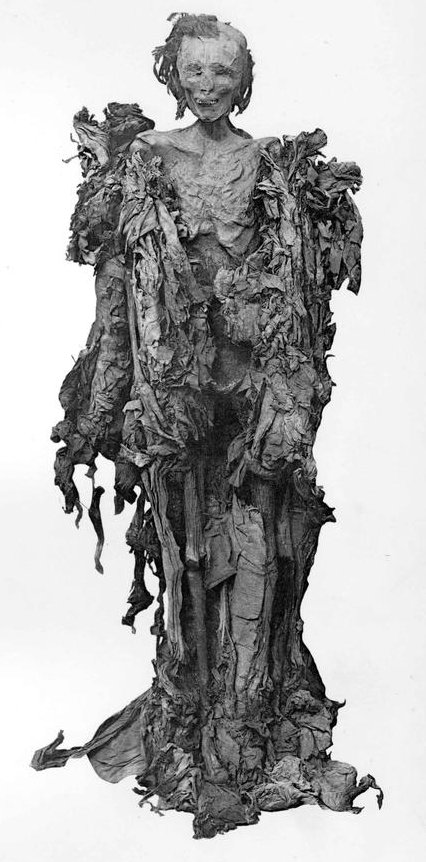
Mummy of Ahmose-inhapy

The Mummy of Ahmose-Inhapy (CG 61053) was found in the outer coffin of Lady Rai (CG 61004), the nurse of Inhapy's niece Queen Ahmose-Nefertari. It was unwrapped by Gaston Maspero on June 26, 1886, and was later examined by Grafton Elliot Smith who described Inhapi as a big, strong-built woman with a strong resemblance to her brother. Smith dates her burial to the later years of the reign of Ahmose I. The mummy had a garland of flowers around its neck. The body was laid out with her arms by her side, and the skin of the mummy was of a dark-brown color. The outer layer of the skin was still present and no evidence of salt was found. This may mean that the body was not immersed in natron as described by Herodotus, Diodorus and others. An incision was made in the left side to allow for the removal of the organs and the cavity may have been treated with natron. The body was sprinkled with aromatic powdered wood and wrapped in resin soaked linen.
