= Ahmose-Nefertari =

Ancient Egyptian queen consort

- Queen consort of Egypt; Great Royal Wife; God's Wife of Amun; Regent
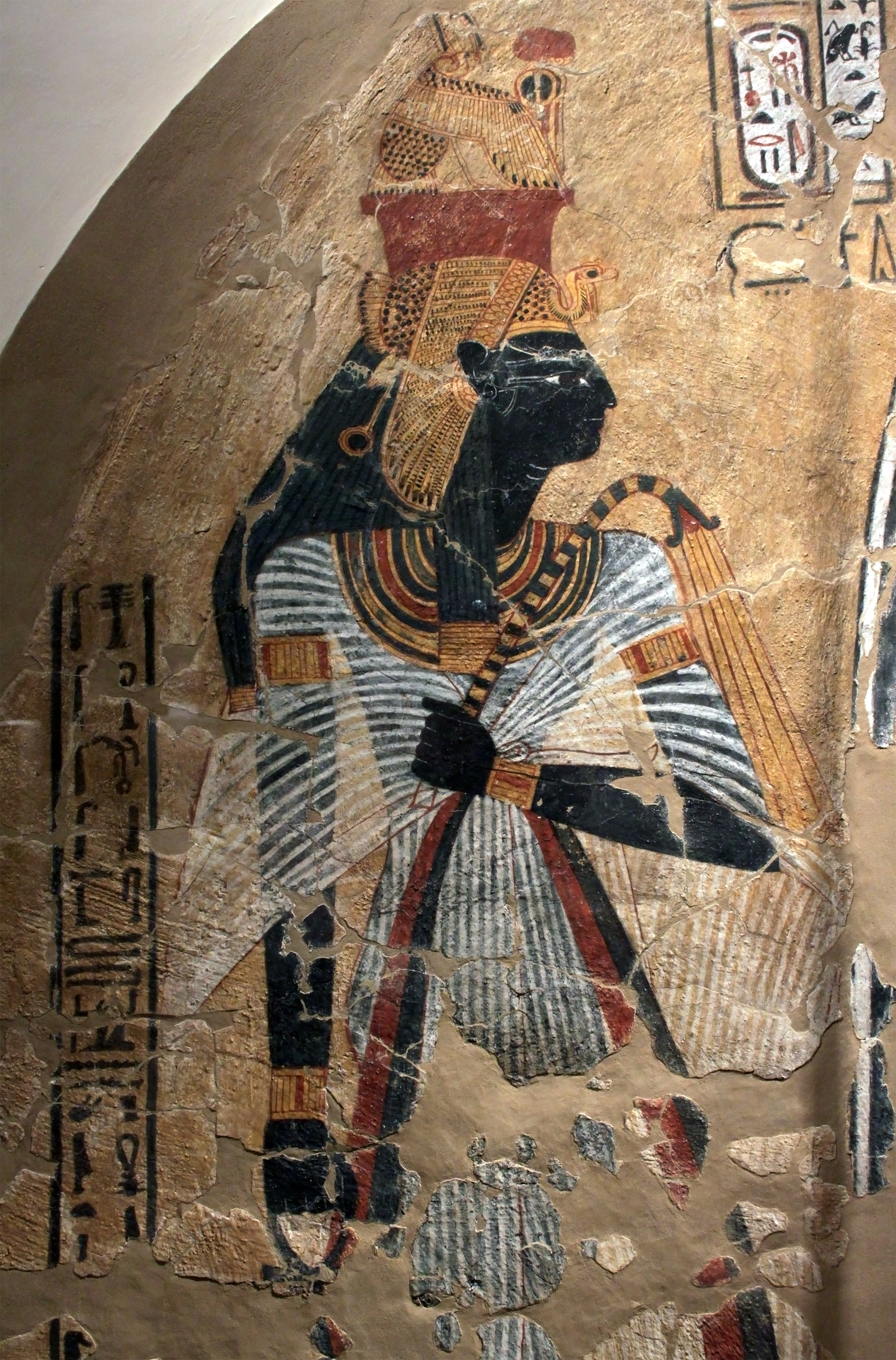
- Ahmose Nefertari in deified form in tomb TT359
- Burial: Mummy found in the Deir el-Bahri royal cache, but was likely originally buried in Dra' Abu el-Naga' (possibly Tomb ANB)
- Spouse: Ahmose I
- Issue: Amenhotep I Ahmose-ankh; Siamun; Ramose ? Ahmose-Meritamun; Mutnofret ? Ahmose-Sitamun
Names
- Ahmose-Nefertari
- Dynasty: 18th Dynasty
- Father: Seqenenre Tao
- Mother: Ahhotep I
- Religion: Ancient Egyptian religion

Ahmose-Nefertari in hieroglyphs
< N12 F31 F35 M17 X1 D21 Z4 >
Ahmose Nefertari
Jꜥḥ ms Nfr trj
Born of Iah, the beautiful companion

Ahmose-Nefertari (Ancient Egyptian: Jꜥḥ ms Nfr trj) was the first Great Royal Wife of the 18th Dynasty of Ancient Egypt. She was a daughter of Seqenenre Tao and Ahhotep I, and royal sister and wife to Ahmose I. Her son Amenhotep I became pharaoh and she may have served as his regent when he was young. Ahmose-Nefertari was deified after her death.

== Family ==
Ahmose-Nefertari was a daughter of Seqenenre Tao and Ahhotep I and the granddaughter of Senakhtenre and queen Tetisheri. Ahmose-Nefertari was born in Thebes, likely during the reign of Senakhtenre Ahmose. Ahmose-Nefertari had quite a few siblings and half-siblings, including her future husband Ahmose and King's Son Ahmose Sapair, and her many sisters: Ahmose-Henutemipet, Ahmose-Tumerisy, Ahmose-Nebetta, Ahmose-Meritamon, Ahmose-Henuttamehu, Ahmose, and Ahmose-Sitkamose.

Ahmose-Nefertari may have married Pharaoh Kamose but, if so, there is no record of such a marriage. She did become the great royal wife of Ahmose I, with whom she had at least three sons. She is depicted on a stela from Karnak with a son named Ahmose-ankh and a son named Siamun was reburied in the royal cache DB320. But it was her son Amenhotep I who would eventually succeed his father to the throne. She was also the mother of two daughters who became Royal Wives, Ahmose-Meritamun and Ahmose-Sitamun. She may also have been the mother of Mutnofret, the wife of Thutmose I. A prince named Ramose included among the Lords of the West and known from a statue now in Liverpool, may be another son of Ahmose-Nefertari.

== Life ==
Fragment of relief depicting Ahmose I and Ahmose-Nefertari, Brooklyn Museum.

Ahmose-Nefertari was born during the latter part of the 17th Dynasty, during the reign of her grandfather Senakhtenre Ahmose. Her father Seqenenre Tao fought against the Hyksos and may have lost his life during a battle. He was succeeded by Kamose. It is possible that Ahmose-Nefertari married Kamose, but no evidence exists of such a marriage.

After the death of Kamose the throne went to Ahmose I. Pharaoh Ahmose was very young and queen-mother Ahhotep I served as regent during the early years of his reign. Ahhotep would have taken precedence at court over her daughter Ahmose-Nefertari, who was the great royal wife. Ahmose I became the first king of the 18th Dynasty, and a pharaoh ruling over a reunited country.

Queen Ahmose-Nefertari held many titles, including those of hereditary princess (iryt-pꜥt), great of grace (wrt-imꜣt), great of praises (wrt-ḥswt), king's mother (mwt-niswt), great king's wife (ḥmt-niswt-wrt), god's wife (hmt-ntr), united with the white crown (ẖnmt-nfr-ḥḏjt), king's daughter (sꜣt-niswt), and king's sister (snt-niswt). The queen was revered as "Goddess of Resurrection" and was arguably the most venerated woman in Egyptian history. Ancient Nubia ruling families have been said to feature strong matriarchal inclinations, a characteristic described as indisputable in the case of the 17th Dynasty. Along with other queens of the period, it has been suggested that the matriarchal quality of Ahmose-Nefertari's rule and line originated from Nubia.

A donation stela from Karnak records how king Ahmose purchased the office of Second Prophet of Amun and endowed the position with land, goods and administrators. The endowment was given to Ahmose-Nefertari and her descendants, though she was the most prominent God's Wife of Amun. Separately the position of Divine adoratrix was also given to Ahmose-Nefertari. Records from a later era indicate that in this position she would have been responsible for all temple properties, administration of estates, workshops, treasuries and all the associated administration staff.

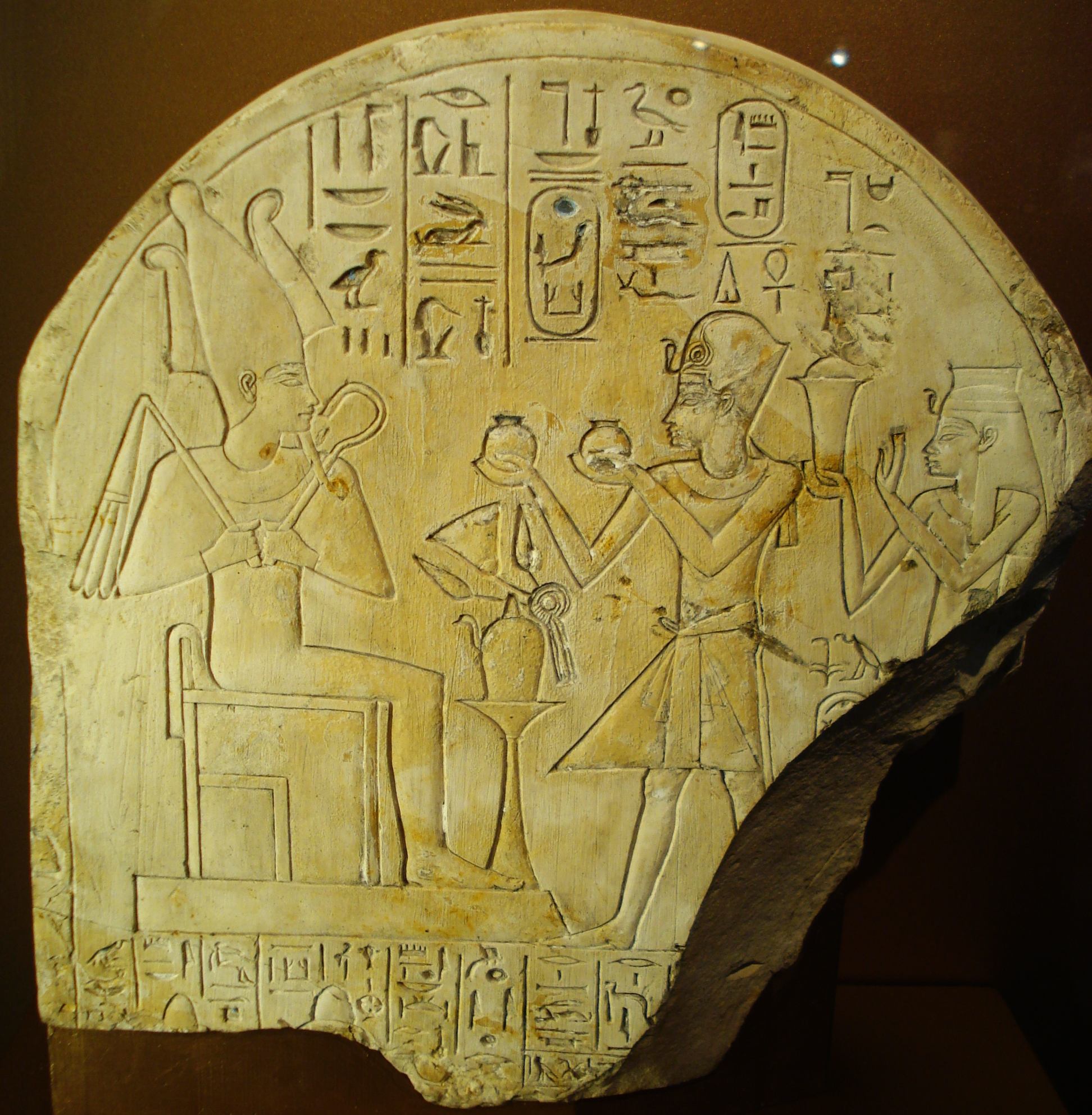
Posthumous stele of Amenhotep I and Ahmose-Nefertari making an offering to Osiris.

Amenhotep I came to power while he was still young. As his mother, Ahmose-Nefertari may have served as regent for him until he reached maturity. Because of her position as regent for her son, some speculate that she started the Valley of the Kings.

Ahmose-Nefertari is shown to be alive during the early years of the reign of Thutmose I. She is depicted in Nubia next to the Viceroy of Kush Ahmose called Turo in the company of the newly crowned king and Queen Ahmose. A vase fragment found in KV20 was inscribed with the double cartouche of king Tuthmose I and Ahmose-Nefertari and the epithet indicates the queen was alive. A large statue of queen Ahmose-Nefertari from Karnak may be one of the last statues created in her honor before she died.

== Death and deification ==
Ahmose-Nefertari
- Major cult center: Deir el-Medina
- Day: II Shemu, 14
- Offspring: Amenhotep I

Ahmose-Nefertari likely died in approximately the fifth or sixth year of Thutmose I. Her death is recorded on the stela of a wab-priest called Nefer. The text mentions that "the divine consort Ahmose-Nefertari, justified with the great god lord of the West, flew to heaven". Helck proposed that the annual cult holiday (II Shemu 14) dedicated to Ahmose-Nefertari at Deir el-Medina may have commemorated the day of her death. The father of Nefer, who was likely overseer of the royal works Ineni, oversaw her burial. She was likely buried in Dra Abu el-Naga and had a mortuary temple there. Considering the placement of her coffin in DB320, Ahmose-Nefertari may have instead been the tomb's original occupant prior to its reuse as a cache. When Ahmose-Nefertari died, she was deified and became "Mistress of the Sky" and "Lady of the West".

=== Mummy ===
Coffin of Ahmose-Nefertari, from DB320

Ahmose-Nefertari's mummy is assumed to have been retrieved from her tomb at the end of the New Kingdom and moved to the royal cache in DB320, had she not originally been buried there. Her presumed body, with no identification marks, was discovered in the 19th century and unwrapped in 1885 by Émile Brugsch. Two mummies were found in a coffin one of which was more carefully wrapped than the other. The former was assumed to be that of Queen Ahmose Nefertari by the museum authorities whilst the other was stored in a damp room which caused the mummy to decompose so much so that it was buried in the garden of the museum. Maspero at later date came to assume that the mummy buried in the garden was that of Ahmose Nefertari. (Note: When Brugsch and Gaston Maspero first unwrapped and examined the supposed mummy of Ahmose-Nefertari, they ascribed her to the "white race". According to Maspero, "the corpse had hardly been exposed to air when it literally began rotting and started oozing blackish pus of an unbearable stench.") The original ownership of the tomb has been challenged. Ahmose-Nefertari died in her 70s. Similarly to Tetisheri, her grandmother, her hair had been thinning and plaits of false hair had been woven in with her own to cover this up. Her body had been damaged in antiquity and was missing her right hand.

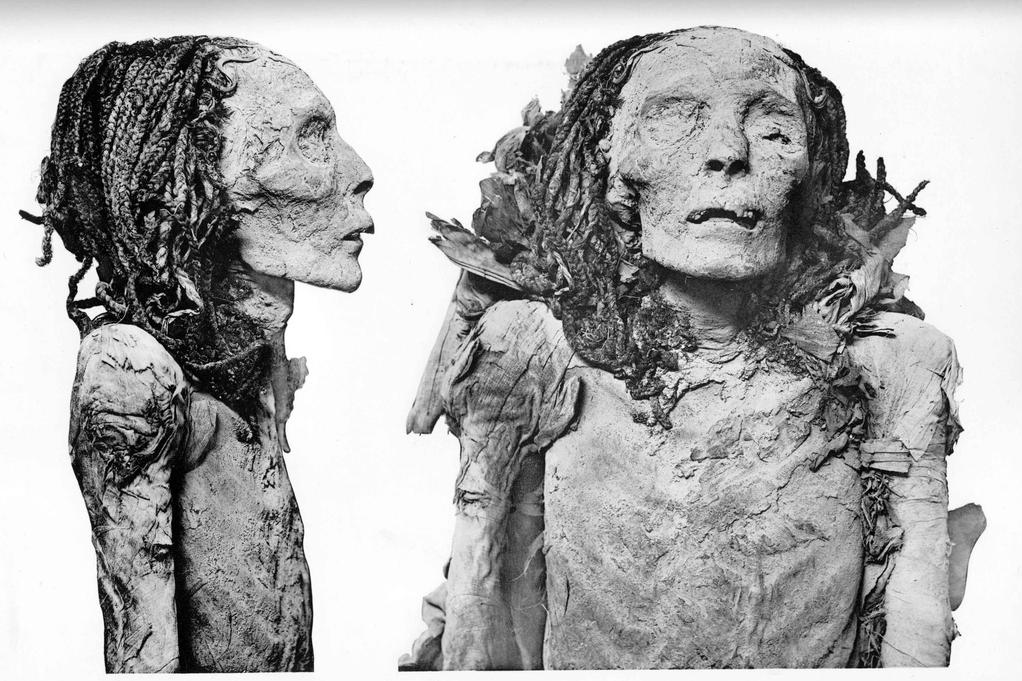
Alleged mummy of Ahmose-Nefertari, from DB320

According to Grafton Elliot Smith's description in 1912, the mummy's skin is blackened in the same manner as the majority of other contemporary mummies. He also associates the strands tied to her own hair with those of Nubian women's hair at the time of his writing. He adds that the shape of the cranium firmly supports her foreign origin. Several authors highlight the significant prominence of Ahmose-Nefertari's front teeth as revealed in X-ray images, and also characterized as severe maxillary or dental-alveolar prognathism. The same authors bring attention to the presence of the same trait in Ahmose-Nefertari's grandmother Tetisheri, suggesting that it is genetically determined and inherited. Harris and Wente add that dental-alveolar prognathism is a common trait in both ancient and current Nubians at the time of their writing. It is stated that Ahmose-Nefertari shares the same pure genealogy as her mother, Ahhotep I.

In April 2021 Ahmose-Nefertari's mummy was moved to National Museum of Egyptian Civilization along with those of 3 other queens and 18 kings in an event termed the Pharaohs' Golden Parade.

=== Iconography ===
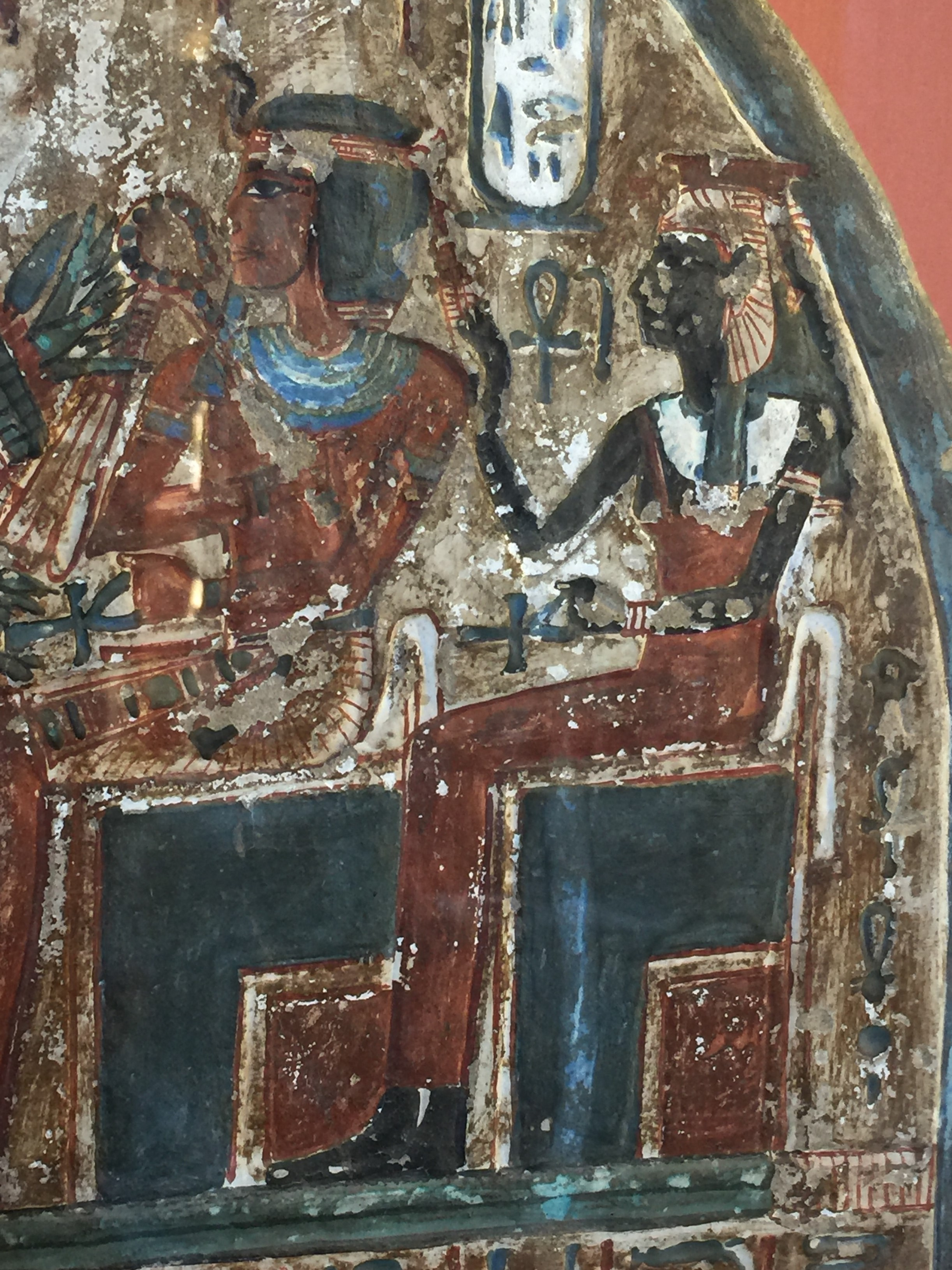
Ahmose-Nefertari, 18th dynasty, Louvre Museum

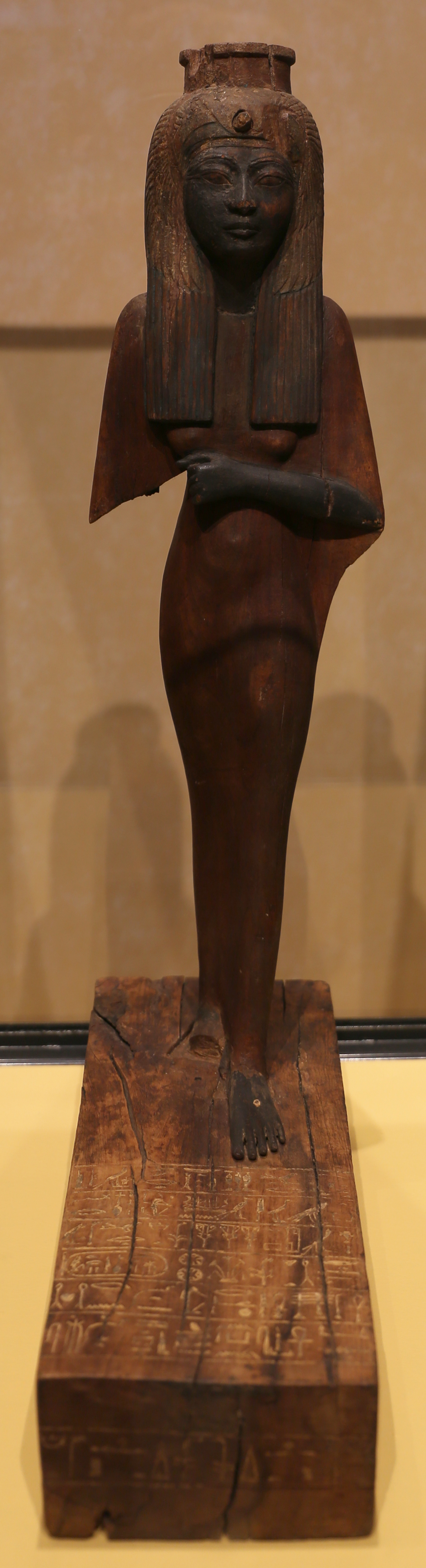
Statuette of Ahmose Nefertari. From Deir el-Medina

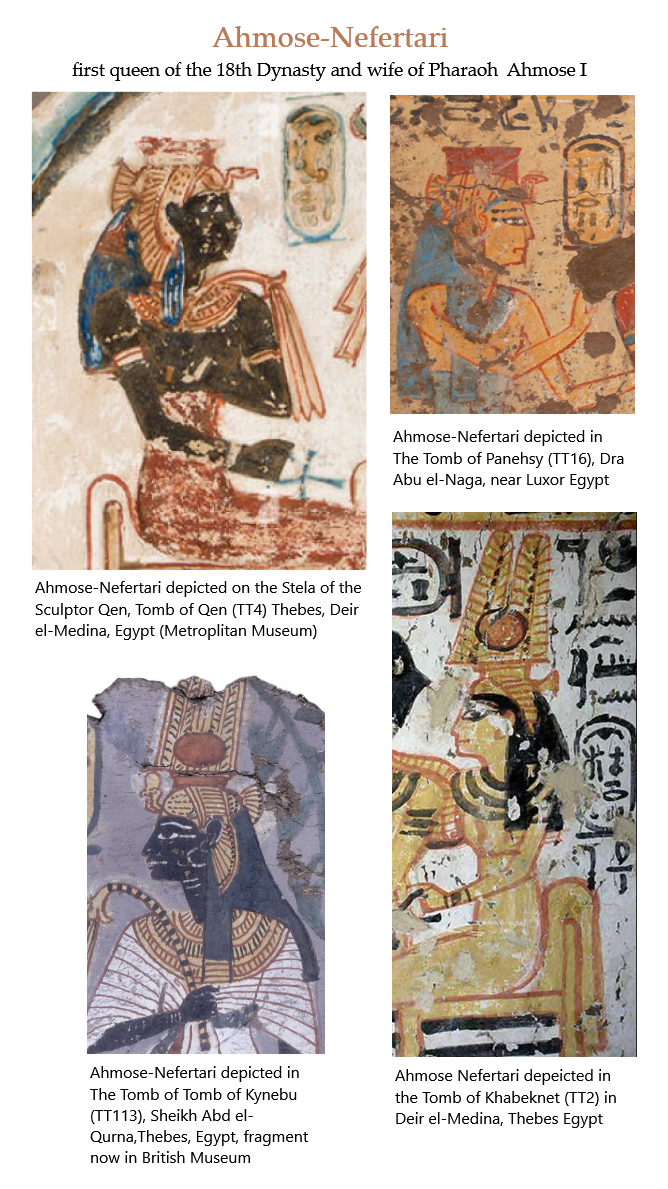
Ahmose-Nefertari 4 depictions from various Tombs

In the Theban region – and especially in the village of Deir el-Medina – Ahmose-Nefertari is mentioned or depicted in at least 50 private tombs and on a large number of objects which are datable from the reign of Thutmose III to the end of the 20th Dynasty.

In the tomb of Tetyky (TT15), the queen is depicted wearing a brow ornament with two uraei instead of a double gazelle. According to Eaton-Krauss, this is the "earliest occurrence of the double uraeus, which is a standard part of queenly regalia thereafter."

Michel Gitton acknowledges Norman de Garis Davis' estimate that Ahmose-Nefertari is depicted with dark complexion (black) four times more often than light complexions (red and yellow). He indicates that his own survey suggests a much lower figure although he could not provide a general figure as he could not himself verify the colors on site. He also noted there are other cases in which she is shown with a pink, golden, dark blue, or dark red skin color. As observed by Gardiner, in some instances Ahmose-Nefertari's skin is blue, a popular color symbolizing fertility, birth, rebirth and life and usually used to depict water and the heavens.

In 1981 Gitton called the issue of Ahmose-Nefertari's black color "a serious gap in the Egyptological research, which allows approximations or untruths". He pointed out that there is no known depiction of her painted during her lifetime (she is represented with the same light skin as other represented individuals in tomb TT15, before her deification); the earliest black skin depiction appears in tomb TT161, circa 150 years after her death. Barbara Lesko wrote in 1996 that Ahmose-Nefertari was "sometimes portrayed by later generations as having been black, although her coffin portrait gives her the typical light yellow skin of women."

Highlighting Ahmose-Nefertari and her son's deification as patrons of Deir el-Medina as well her worship as 'Mistress of the Sky', 'Lady of the West' and goddess of resurrection, Joyce Tyldesley indicates in 2006 that frequently in this setting she was depicted with black skin which symbolizes "fertility and rebirth rather than decay". Sigrid Hodel-Hoenes states in 2000 that her black skin color can be attributed to her role as deified patron of Deir el-Medina, the color black being a reflection of "fertile earth and of the Netherworld and death" In 2011, Graciela Gestoso Singer states that her black or blue skin color is "a reference to her position as the mother of Egypt" and indicative of her role as a goddess of resurrection, since black is the color of death, the underworld, rebirth and fertility, as well as the fertile land of Egypt. In 2003, Betsy Bryan wrote in The Oxford History of Ancient Egypt that "the factors linking Amenhotep I and his mother with the necropolis region, with deified rulers, and with rejuvenation generally was visually transmitted by representations of the pair with black or blue skin – both colours of resurrection." In 2004 Aidan Dodson and Dyan Hilton recognized in a later depiction of the queen, "the black skin of a deity of resurrection" in connection to her role as a patron goddess of the Theban necropolis. In 2009 Eleni Vassilika, noting that in a wooden statuette of the queen (now at the Museo Egizio) the face is painted black but the arms and feet are light in color, argued that the reason for the black coloring in that case was religious and not genetic. In 2014, Margaret Bunson wrote that "the unusual depictions of Ahmose-Nefertari in blue-black tones of deification reflect her status and cult." In a wooden votive statue of Ahmose-Nefertari, currently in the Louvre museum, her skin was painted red, a color commonly seen symbolizing life or a higher being, or elevated status.

Early 20th century archaeologists made observations on Ahmose-Nefertari's likely phenotype and genealogy, and also on the probable symbolic meaning of her most frequent representation in black or purplish black skin tones. (Note: In the early 20th century, Flinders Petrie spoke of "a black queen", Ahmose-Nefertari, who was the "divine ancestress of the XVIIIth dynasty". He described her physically as having "an aquiline nose, long and thin, and was of a type not in the least prognathous". He also stated that "a possibility of the black being symbolic has been suggested". In 1925, Norman de Garis Davies observed that the tone of the queen's depicted skin is not always coal-black, but also "a purplish black, reached by painting black over red". He added that, "it might only indicate a very dark complexion, such as now often occurs in Egypt". In 1940, Alan Rowe believed that the queen's black skin tone on some depictions could be traced to African ancestry. Supposing the queen to be Kamose's daughter, Alan Gardiner wrote in 1961 of the paintings of Ahmose-Nefertari that she was "depicted for some unaccountable reason with a black countenance, but also sometimes with a blue one; if she was a daughter of Kamose she will have had no black blood in her veins." The prevailing view is in fact that Ahmose-Nefertari is the daughter of Seqenenre Tao who has been described as presenting "tightly curled, woolly hair", with "a slight build and strongly Nubian features" including untreated dark brown skin, and as more similar to his wife, his descendants and their wives than to later rulers.) In 1974, Cheikh Anta Diop described her as "typically negroid." In the controversial book Black Athena, Martin Bernal intimated that members of the royal family to which Ahmose-Nefertari belonged may have originated from Nubia, and, according to him, 18th dynasty pharaohs could generally be referred to as black. (Note: Bernal stated that: "many of the most powerful Egyptian dynasties which were based in Upper Egypt - the 11th, 12th, 18th - were made up of pharaohs whom one can usefully call black." In the same work, he added that, "It is generally, and reasonably, agreed today that if the members of the royal family of the 18th Dynasty were foreign, they were Nubian." According to him, "from their portraits they would seem to have been Blacks.") Bernal's work has been embraced by Afrocentrists, but rejected by mainstream Egyptologists. (Note: Citing Mary Lefkowitz's controversial work, historian Christina Riggs states that "Black Athena was embraced by Afrocentrists and postcolonial studies even as archaeology, Egyptology and classical scholarship rejected much of Bernal's evidence and, implicitly or explicitly, his central thesis." She adds that the "dichotomy mirrors the separate spheres these subjects occupy in professional life, since Afrocentrism and mainstream Egyptology rarely meet" The work and Afrocentrism broadly is discussed in the Oxford Encyclopedia of Ancient Egypt. Edmund S. Meltzer states that "Afrocentrist claims have recently received a detailed and sympathetic discussion by Martin Bernal in his controversial work Black Athena, and in the late 1980s and 1990s Afrocentric issues are being addressed by mainstream Egyptologists". Rene van Wanselm states that "Afrocentrism is one of the most influential but disputable off-shoots on the burgeoning tree of pseudo-Egyptology, and the most recent and manipulative in this respect in Martin Bernal's Black-Athena thesis, which claims that Greece was twice "colonized" from Egypt and that, consequently, the Greek civilization originates from "black" Egyptians". Lefkowitz and Rogers wrote that, as a consequence of his lack of scholarly method, "Bernal's work has been almost universally rejected by Egyptologists, archaeologists, linguists, historians, and other scholars best acquainted with the material evidence. Most regard it as beyond the boundaries of legitimate scientific inquiry." Their work has been characterized as favoring speculation over eye witness accounts and Lefkowitz's scholarship in particular as ethnocentric, pedestrian and as representing a singular view. Lefkowitz work is discussed in the OEAE by Ann Macy Roth where she described the work as "an uneven but cumulatively devastating collection of critiques of Bernal's arguments".)
