= Ahmose-ankh =

Ancient Egyptian prince

< iaH ms O34 > S34
Ahmose-ankh
in hieroglyphs
Era: New Kingdom
(1550–1069 BC)

Ahmose-ankh was a crown prince during the reign of Ahmose I (r. 1570-1546 BC high chronology) in the early Eighteenth dynasty of Egypt.

== Family ==
He was the son of Pharaoh Ahmose I and Queen Ahmose Nefertari. He was the crown prince but pre-deceased his father, thus the next pharaoh was his younger brother Amenhotep I. His sister was Ahmose-Meritamun. As his father ascended the throne at the age of 10, Ahmose-ankh must have been born well into the reign. Secondly, he seems to have died at the second part of his fathers reign which lasted 25 years. As a result, Ahmose-ankh was most likely around 20 years old or younger when he died.

== Attestation ==
- Harari, ASAE 56 | A stela which depicts him with his parents (Luxor Museum).

== Bibliography ==
- Aidan Dodson & Dyan Hilton: The Complete Royal Families of Ancient Egypt. Thames & Hudson, 2004, ISBN 0-500-05128-3, p. 129
