= Ahhotep I =

Queen consort of Egypt (c. 1560–1530 BCE)

- Queen consort of Egypt; Great Royal Wife; Queen Regent
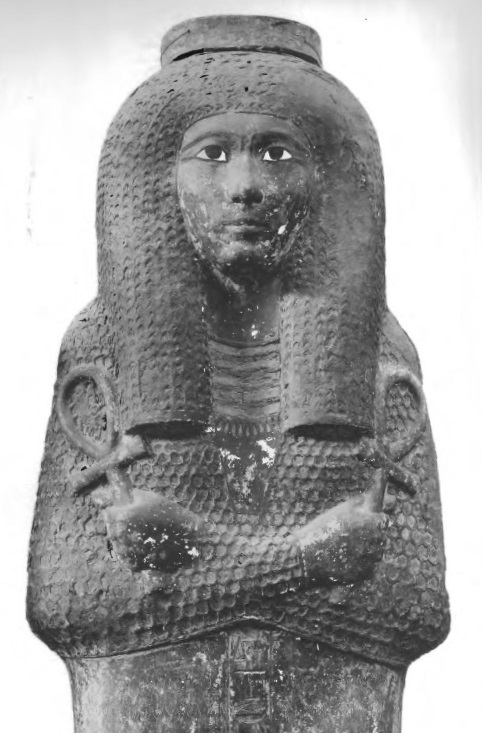
- Coffin of Ahhotep I
- Burial: Possibly Deir el-Bahari
- Spouse: Seqenenre Tao
- Issue: Kamose (?); Ahmose I; Ahmose-Nefertari; Ahmose Sapair (?); Binpu (?); Ahmose-Henutemipet (?); Ahmose-Nebetta; Ahmose-Tumerisy
Egyptian name
iaH R4 t p
- Dynasty: Seventeenth Dynasty of Egypt
- Father: Senakhtenre
- Mother: Tetisheri

Ahhotep I (Ancient Egyptian: jꜥḥ-ḥtp (.w), alternatively Anglicized Ahhotpe or Aahhotep, "Iah (the Moon) is satisfied") was an ancient Egyptian queen who lived c. 1560–1530 BCE, during the end of the Seventeenth Dynasty and beginning of the Eighteenth Dynasty of Egypt. Her titles include King's Daughter, King's Sister, Great (Royal) Wife, She who is joined to the White Crown, and King's Mother. She was the daughter of Queen Tetisheri and Pharaoh Senakhtenre Ahmose, and was probably the sister, as well as the queen consort, of Pharaoh Seqenenre Tao.

Ahhotep I had a long and influential life, and is believed to have governed as a regent for her young son, Ahmose I, until he was old enough to rule. A stela found at Karnak praises Ahhotep's abilities as a leader, and the cult of Amenhotep I continued to remember Ahhotep after her death, up until at least the Twenty-first Dynasty.

While the 19th-century discovery of two separate coffins in Egypt set off debates about Ahhotep's identity and true burial place—which have continued into the 21st century—scholars have gradually become more widely accepting that a coffin found in Deir el-Bahari, at some point reused to bury a high priest, likely first belonged to Ahhotep I.

== Family ==
Ahhotep I was the daughter of Queen Tetisheri and Pharaoh Senakhtenre Ahmose. (Note: Due to a prior belief that there were two pharaohs with the same name of Seqenenre Tao, many scholarly sources name Ahhotep's father as Seqenenre Tao I and her husband as Seqenenre Tao II – but there is now wider recognition that the pharaoh considered to be Seqenenre Tao I was actually named Senakhtenre Ahmose.) She was the royal wife of the Seventeenth Dynasty king Seqenenre Tao, also believed to be her brother.

Ahhotep was the mother of Pharaoh Ahmose I. Her exact relationship to Pharaoh Kamose is not known, but he may have been her brother-in-law (the brother of Seqenenre Tao) or her son. Ahhotep's other children include Princess Ahmose-Nebetta, Princess Ahmose-Tumerisy, and the later Queen Ahmose-Nefertari, who was married to her brother, Ahmose I. While Prince Ahmose Sapair, Prince Binpu, and Princess Ahmose-Henutemipet may also have been children of Ahhotep, their maternity is less certain.

== Life ==
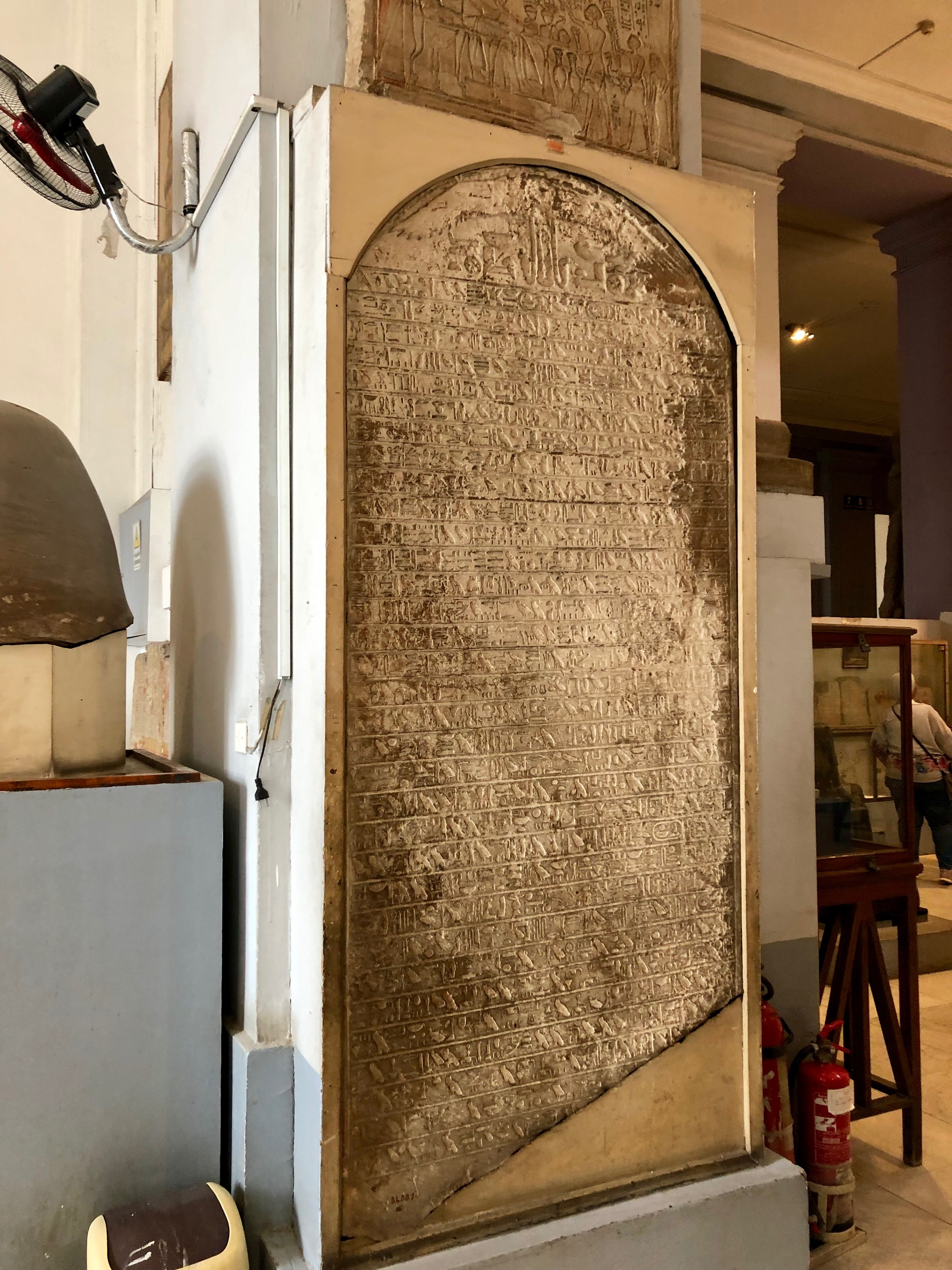
Stela from Karnak, containing praise for Queen Ahhotep

At the beginning of Pharaoh Seqenenre Tao's reign, the Hyksos had controlled parts of northern and central Egypt for close to a century. Backed by the support of family, including Ahhotep I, Seqenenre Tao began a military campaign to take back control. He died from injuries sustained in battle, and was briefly succeeded by Pharaoh Kamose, who continued to lead the campaign against the Hyksos. Kamose died in battle only three years later, leaving Queen Ahhotep's young son, Ahmose I, as the next heir to the throne.

Scholars believe that Ahhotep took on governing responsibilities as a regent for her son until he was old enough to rule. A stela found in Karnak from the reign of Ahmose I has a section that describes Ahhotep I as ruling Egypt and uniting its people, attributes that are normally reserved for kings. The stela's praise of Ahhotep can be translated as follows:

Give jubilation to the Mistress of the Land, the ruler of the riverbanks of Hau-nebu, with a renowned name in every land, and who does the will of the masses. The King's Wife, the Sovereign's Sister, life-prosperity-health, the King's Daughter and the august King's Mother, who knows matters, and upholds Egypt; she has united its officer class; and she has protected it; she has returned its deserters and she gathers its dissidents; she has pacified Upper Egypt and she quells its rebels, the King's Wife, Ahhotep, living.

Based partially on the stela's text, scholars have speculated that Ahhotep commanded the Egyptian army, perhaps during her son's youth or while he was later abroad as an adult. In a linguistic analysis of the stela, Taneash Sidpura has posited that the wording does not necessarily imply direct military leadership but makes it clear Ahhotep was considered an effective ruler whose knowledge and abilities helped unite her people.

Ahhotep's governing influence likely continued in some form throughout her son's official reign once he came of age—and perhaps beyond. Through an analysis of Egyptian royal officials from the early Eighteenth Dynasty, Beatriz Noria Serrano notes that the officials explicitly linked to Ahhotep I (e.g., through titles, inscriptions, and artifacts) generally held civil administrative positions, such as "overseer of the double house of gold", "overseer of the double granary of the (royal wife and) king's mother Ahhotep", or "senior steward of the king's mother". In contrast, officials explicitly linked to Ahmose I were generally involved with border administration or the cult of the god Amun. Noria Serrano suggests this could indicate an ongoing division of ruling responsibilities between Ahhotep I and her son: Ahhotep may have managed administration of the palace and capital city of Thebes, along with other internal affairs, while Ahmose I focused his attentions on issues of border administration and the solidification of royal power abroad. Civil administrative officials only displayed clear links to the king again during the reign of Thutmose I, who came to power after the reigns of both Ahmose I and his son Amenhotep I had ended.

Although exact dates are uncertain, scholars generally agree that Ahhotep I had a long life, outliving her son Ahmose I. Ahhotep is mentioned on the Kares stela (CG 34003), which dates to year ten of the reign of her grandson Amenhotep I, and her steward Iuf also mentions her on his stela (CG 34009). Iuf refers to Ahhotep as the mother of Ahmose I, and would later be the steward of Queen Ahmose, wife of Thutmose I. This suggests Ahhotep I may have died at a fairly advanced age during the reign of Thutmose I.

The cult of Amenhotep I continued to remember Ahhotep after her death, up until at least the Twenty-first Dynasty, and her depiction has been found in multiple New Kingdom tombs where the tomb owners included her in their lists of respected ancestors.

== Debate over two different Queen Ahhoteps: Ahhotep I and Ahhotep II ==
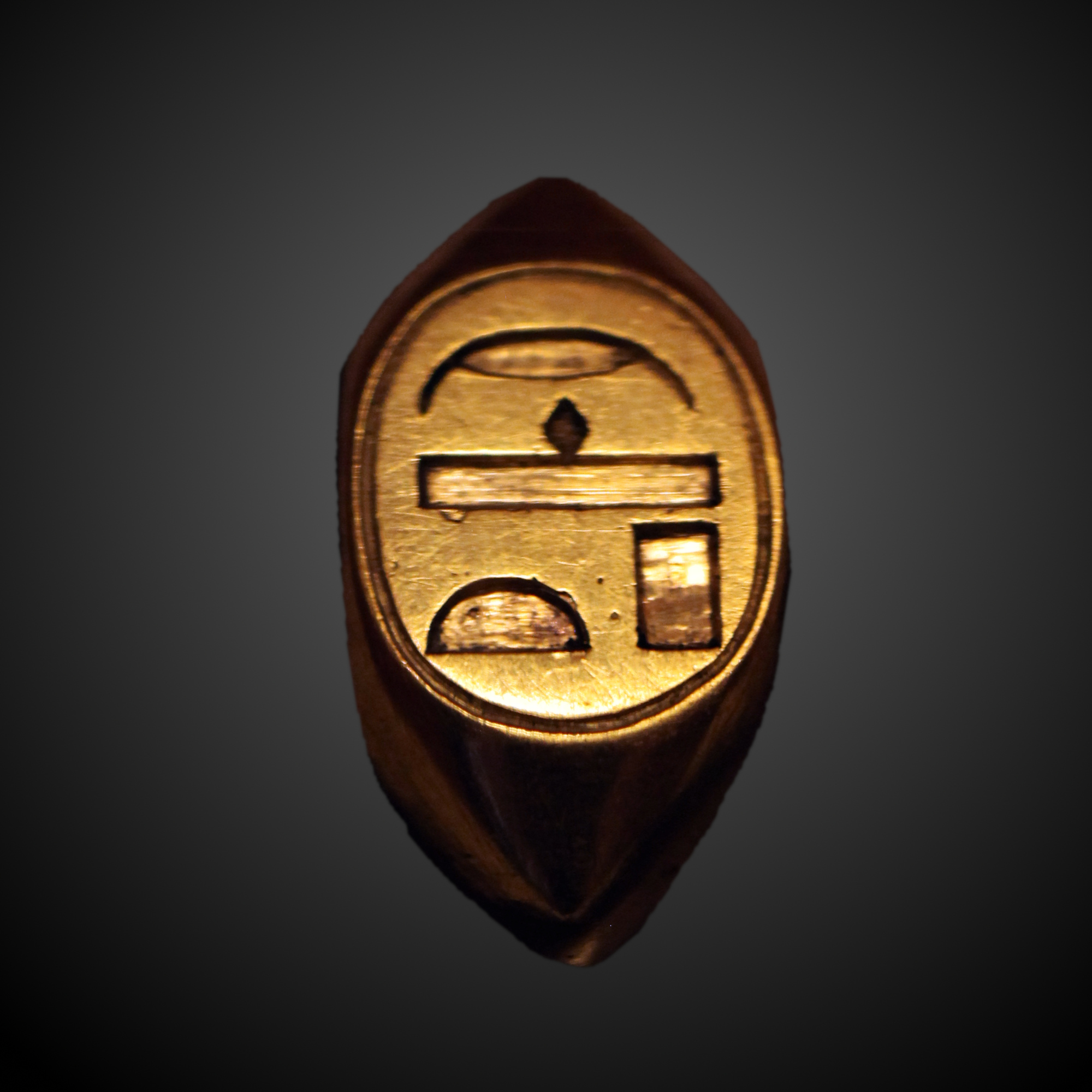
Ring of Ahhotep I, in Louvre

=== Two coffins ===
In 1859, a team of Egyptian workers employed by French Egyptologist Auguste Mariette discovered a coffin at a dig site in Dra' Abu el-Naga. The coffin was identified as belonging to a queen named Ahhotep and inscribed with the titles "Great Royal Wife" and "She who is joined to the White Crown". While the coffin contained a mummy when first discovered, the body and bandaging were destroyed soon afterwards, leaving behind little evidence to confirm the identity of the coffin's inhabitant.

In 1881, a separate team at Deir el-Bahari in the Royal Cache unearthed another coffin, this one also belonging to a queen named Ahhotep. This coffin had a longer, more elaborate set of titles inscribed, including the addition of "King's Daughter", "King's Sister", and "King's Mother", but did not contain the body of an individual named Ahhotep. Instead, this coffin had apparently been reused to bury a Theban high priest named Pinedjem I. The discovery of this second coffin raised new questions about the identity of the Ahhotep from the Dra' Abu el-Naga' site, igniting a scholarly debate over the true number of Egyptian queens named Ahhotep.

=== Theories around identity ===
Initially, scholars assumed the name Ahhotep and similar titles inscribed on the coffins meant that both vessels probably belonged to the same Queen Ahhotep: perhaps the coffin at Deir el-Bahari had originally been designed to contain the one at Dra' Abu el-Naga, and the coffins had become separated. However, the dimensions of the coffins did not support this scenario. Because the coffin at Dra' Abu el-Naga' was found buried with items inscribed with the names of the pharaohs Kamose and Ahmose I, it was also proposed that the Dra' Abu el-Naga Ahhotep could be the mother of Ahmose (and perhaps the wife of Kamose or Pharaoh Seqenenre Tao). Versions of this theory were popular among researchers well into the early 20th century.

However, beginning in the 1960s, scholars began ascribing more importance to the royal title of "King's Mother", which appeared only on the Deir el-Bahari coffin. The unexplained absence of this title from the burial at Dra' Abu el-Naga' meant that the two coffins likely belonged to two separate queens named Ahhotep. Consequently, the "King's Mother" at Deir el-Bahari has become more widely linked to Queen Ahhotep I, mother of Pharaoh Ahmose I, while the "Great Royal Wife" at Dra' Abu el-Naga, who seemingly did not have a son, brother, or father who ascended the throne, has been proposed as a second Queen Ahhotep, whose identity and placement in royal family trees is still under much speculation. Ahhotep II is now generally regarded as the queen identified from the gilded coffin found at Dra' Abu el-Naga and, therefore, possibly a wife of Kamose. It is no longer considered that there was a queen called Ahhotep III by prominent Egyptologists including Aidan Dodson.

Researchers in the 20th and 21st centuries have continued to explore the theory of a single Ahhotep, (Note: For examples, see discussions by Eaton-Krauss and Sidpura.) although academic Marilina Betrò posits that these interpretations of the available evidence "present more problems than they solve." Other scholars have offered alternative reconstructions that argue for the existence of at least three Ahhoteps, (Note: For example, see discussion by Ann Macy Roth.) with chronological orders and numbering changing depending on the interpretations.

== Deir el-Bahari Tomb ==
The coffin of Ahhotep I, found at the Royal Cache (TT320) in Deir el-Bahari, is made of wood and cartonnage. It provides an earlier example of the "rishi-design" for Egyptian coffins (feather-like patterns appearing across the body), and demonstrates many stylistic similarities to the coffin of Ahhotep's daughter Ahmose-Nefertari. The type of lunar crescent symbol found in its inscriptions makes it probable that the coffin was inscribed for Ahhotep after the reign of Ahmose I, when the symbol had culturally undergone a change in depiction.

Scholar Ann Macy Roth has remarked that the face carved onto Ahhotep's coffin is "quite similar to that of Ahmose on his coffin ... although his chin is squarer, and her eyes and brows are very like those on the coffin of Ahmes-Nefertari."

At some point, Ahhotep I's coffin was reused to bury the high priest Pinudjem I at Deir el-Bahari. No funerary equipment belonging to Ahhotep I was found with this coffin, and the question of whether her original burial place was truly at Deir el-Bahari or elsewhere remains unanswered.
