= Ahmose-Meritamon (17th dynasty) =

- King's Daughter; King's Sister
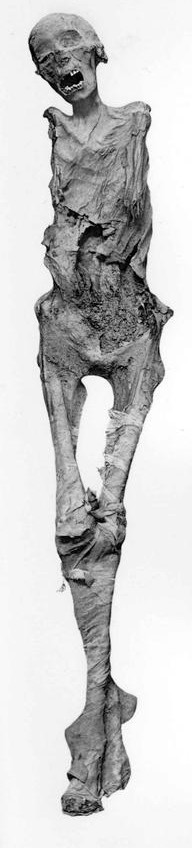
- Burial: Reburied in DB320
Egyptian name
iaH ms i mn n mr i i t
- Dynasty: 17th Dynasty
- Father: Probably Seqenenre Tao

Ahmose-Meritamon ("Born of the Moon, Beloved of Amun") was a princess of the 17th Dynasty of Egypt, probably a daughter of pharaoh Seqenenre Tao (the Brave). She is also called Ahmose-Meritamun, Ahmose-Meryetamun or just Meryetamun.

Her mummy was found in the Deir el-Bahri cache (DB320) and is now in the Egyptian Museum in Cairo. The shroud covering her body gives her name and titles as the royal daughter, the royal sister Meritamon. Gaston Maspero had doubts about the identity of the mummy, but Grafton Elliot Smith points out in his description of the royal mummies that the method of mummification is consistent with that of the 18th Dynasty. The remains are those of an old woman who was relatively short in stature. Her organs were removed through an incision on the left side and her body cavity packed with resin-treated linen and "aromatic sawdust". The examination of her mummy shows that she suffered a head wound prior to her death which has the characteristics of a wound sustained when falling backwards. The body was badly damaged by tomb robbers. Her arms are missing, likely having been broken off in antiquity. In 2020 her mummy was CT scanned. She is estimated to have died at about 50 years old and was 151 centimetres (4.95 ft) tall. She had extensive hardening of the arteries (atherosclerosis) and is suggested to have died of a sudden heart attack. Her unusual pose is considered to be the position she died in and was mummified in it, with her body not being found before rigor mortis set in.

She is not to be confused with her niece Ahmose-Meritamon, who became the wife of Amenhotep I.
