= Seqenenre Tao =

Pharaoh from the Seventeenth Dynasty of Ancient Egypt

- Tao the Brave
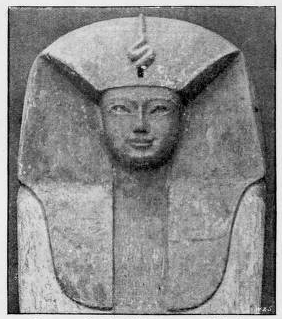
- Rishi coffin of Seqenenre Tao, as found in 1881, before being moved to the Cairo Egyptian Museum

Pharaoh
- Reign: c. 1560 - 1555 BC
- Predecessor: Senakhtenre Ahmose
- Successor: Kamose
Royal titulary
Horus name
Khaemwaset
Ḫˁj-m-W3st
He appears in Thebes
G5	N28 Aa13 R19 t N24
Prenomen
Seqenenre
Sqnj-n-rˁ
He whom Ra makes brave / He who strikes like RaM23 t L2 t < N5 O34 N29 N35 N35 A24 >
Karnak king list:
Seqenenre
Sqnj-n-rˁ
He whom Ra makes brave / He who strikes like Ra
M23 t L2 t < N5 O34 N29 N35 N35 >
Nomen
Ta'a
T3-ˁ3
Thoth is great

G39 N5	X1 O47 O29 D36 Y1
- Consorts: Ahhotep I, Ahmose Inhapi, Sitdjehuti
- Children: Kamose, Ahmose I, Ahmose-Nefertari, Henutemipet, Meritamon, Nebetta, Sapair, Tumerisy, Binpu, Ahmose, Henuttamehu
- Father: Senakhtenre Ahmose
- Mother: Tetisheri
- Died: in his 40s
- Burial: Mummy found in the Deir el-Bahri royal cache, but was likely originally buried in Dra' Abu el-Naga'
- Monuments: Palace and fortifications at Deir el-Ballas
- Dynasty: 17th dynasty

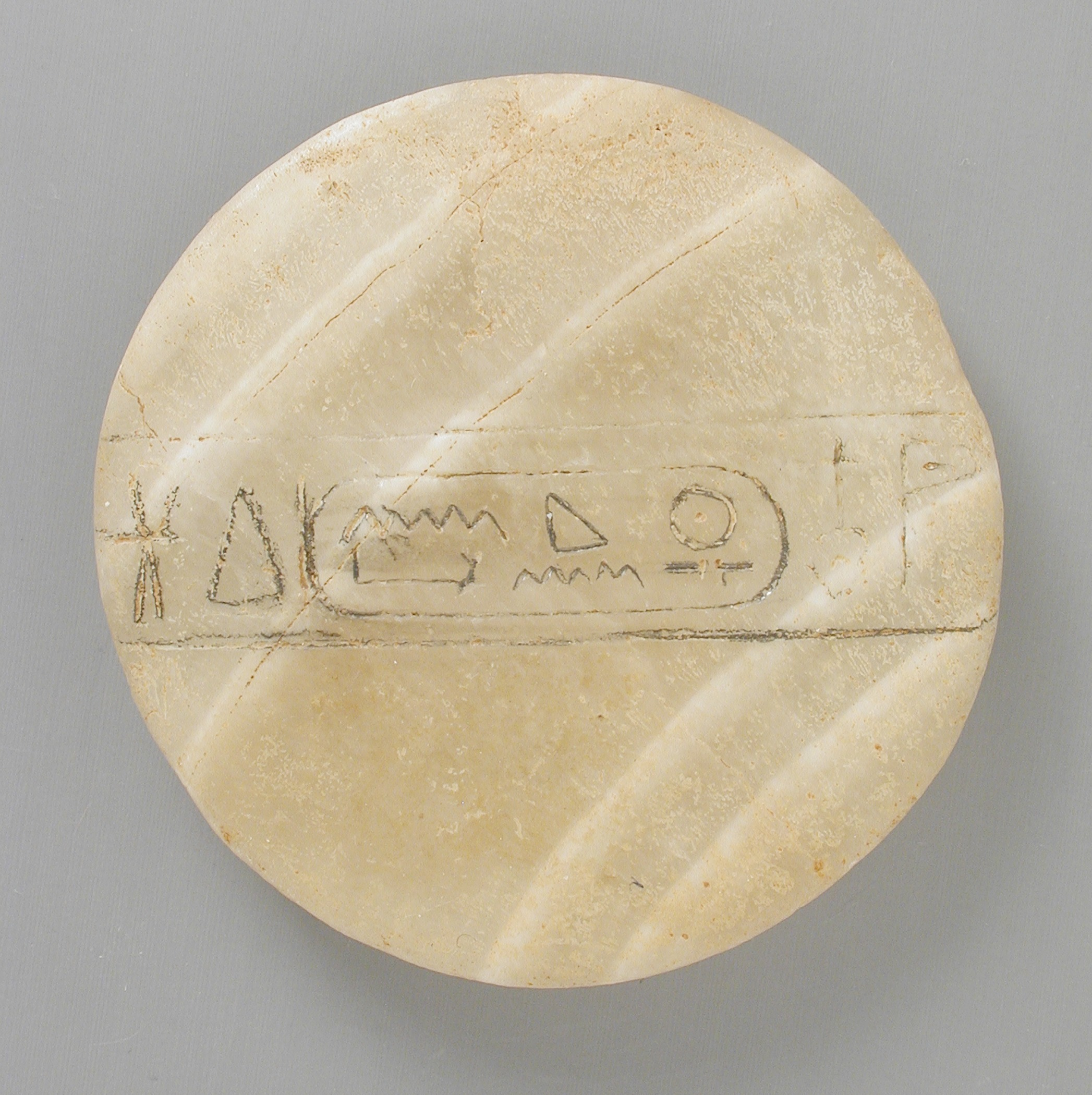
Jar lid with the throne name of Seqenenre Tao

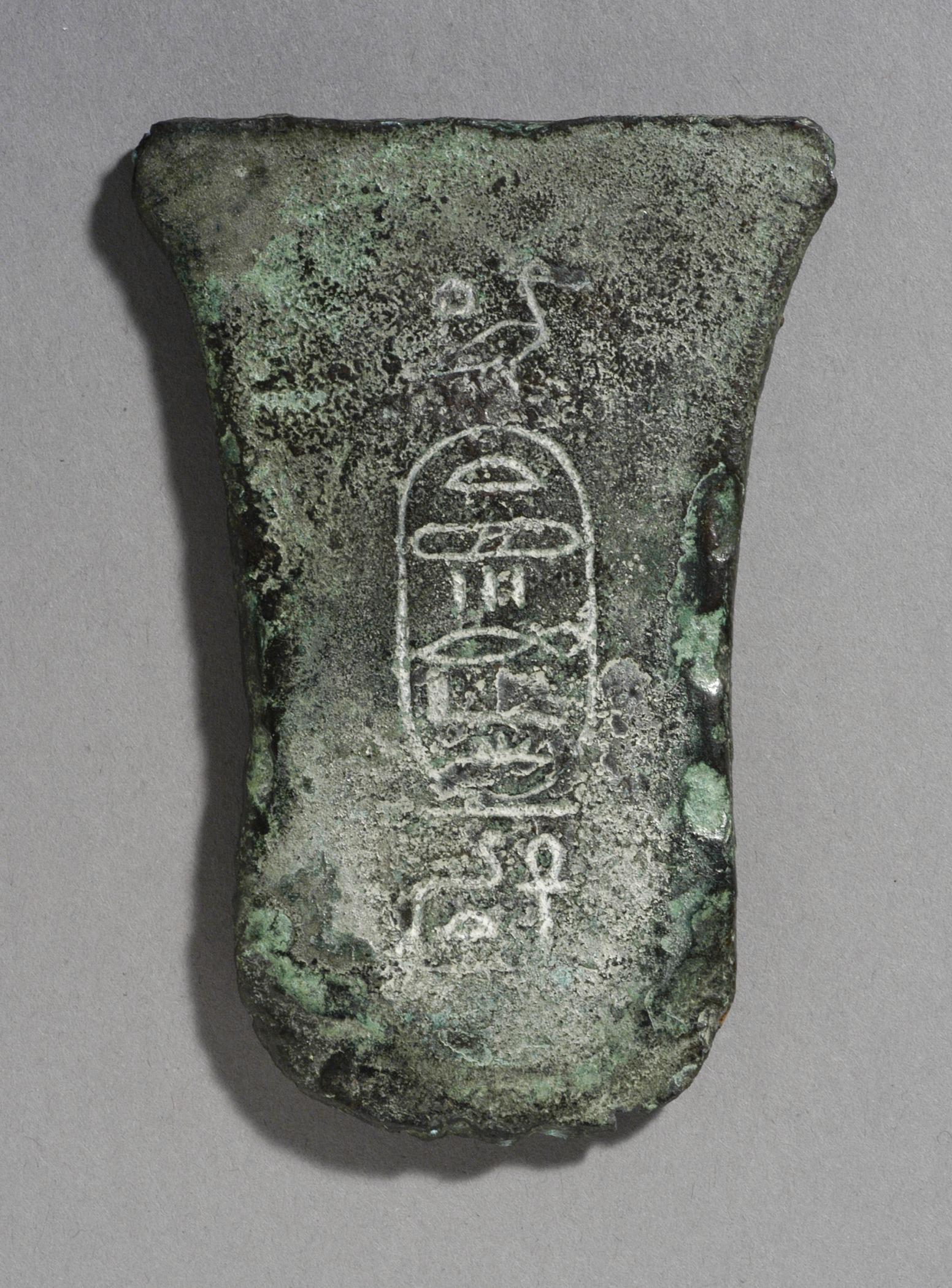
Ceremonial battle axe inscribed with the name of Seqenenre Tao

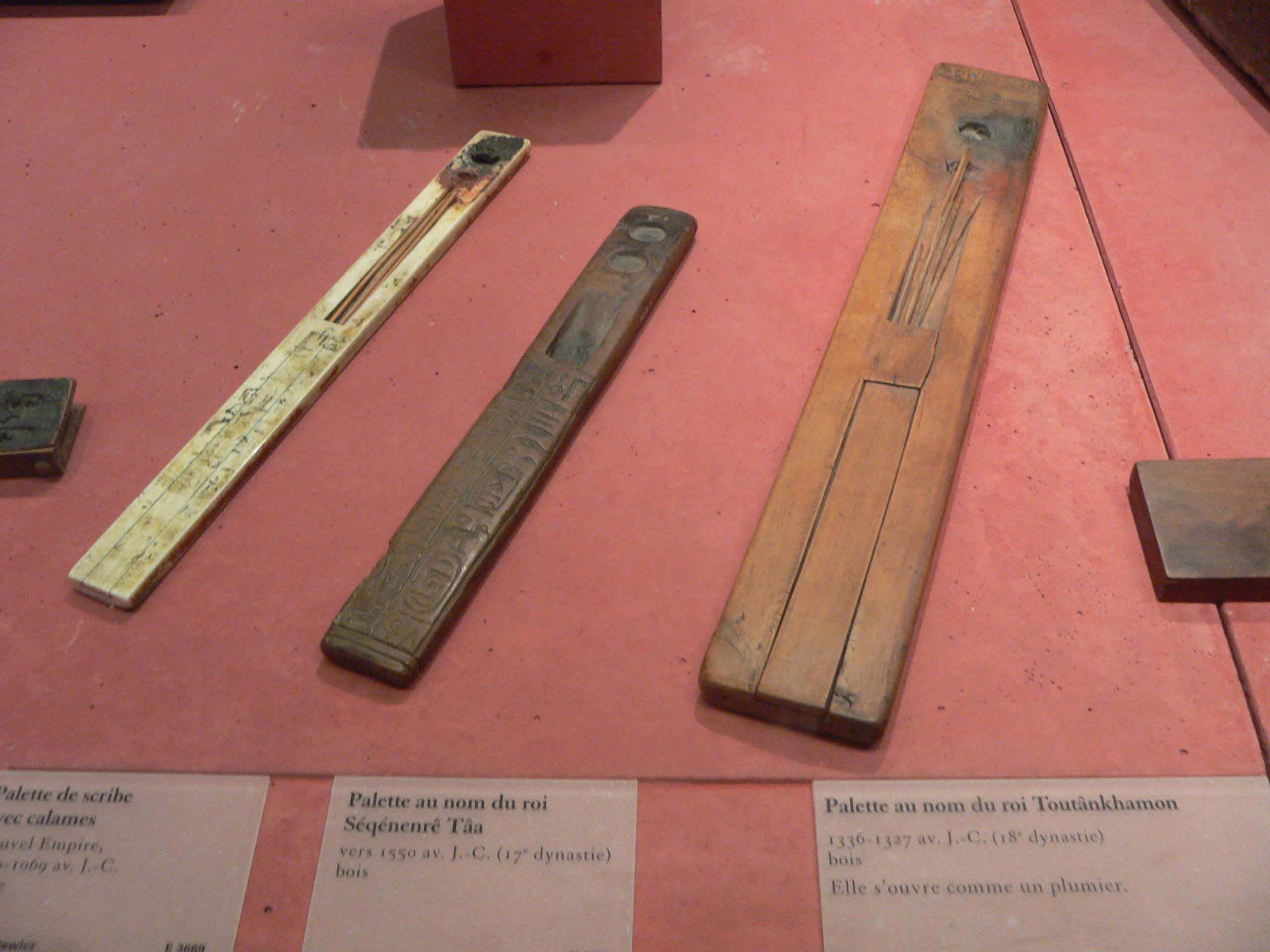
A scribal palette with Seqenenre Tao's name inscribed on it (in center), at the Louvre.

Seqenenre Tao (also Seqenera Djehuty-aa or Sekenenra Taa, called 'the Brave') was a pharaoh who ruled over the last of the local kingdoms of the Theban region of Egypt in the Seventeenth Dynasty during the Second Intermediate Period.

== Family ==
=== Parentage ===
He probably was the son and successor to Senakhtenre Ahmose and Queen Tetisheri.

=== Wife and Children ===
With his queen, Ahhotep I, Seqenenre Tao fathered two pharaohs: Kamose, his immediate successor who was the last pharaoh of the Seventeenth Dynasty, and Ahmose I, who, following a regency by his mother, was the first pharaoh of the Eighteenth. Seqenenre Tao is credited with starting the opening moves in a war of revanchism against Hyksos incursions into Egypt, which saw the country completely liberated during the reign of his son Ahmose I.

== Reign ==
The dates of his reign are uncertain, but he may have risen to power in the decade ending in 1560 BC or in 1558 BC, based on the probable accession date of his son, Ahmose I, the first ruler of the Eighteenth Dynasty; see Egyptian chronology.

=== Quarrel of Apophis and Seqenenre ===
New Kingdom literary tradition states that Seqenenre Tao came into contact with his Hyksos contemporary in the north, Apepi or Apophis. The tradition took the form of a tale, nowadays called "The Quarrel of Apophis and Seqenenre", in which the Hyksos king Apepi sent a messenger to Seqenenre in Thebes to demand that the Theban hippopotamus pool be done away with, for the noise of these beasts was such that he was unable to sleep in far-away Avaris. Perhaps the only historical information that can be gleaned from the tale is that Egypt was a divided land, the area of direct Hyksos control being in the north, but the whole of Egypt paying tribute to the Hyksos kings.

Seqenenre Tao participated in active diplomatic posturing, which went beyond simply exchanging insults with the Asiatic ruler in the North. He seems to have led military skirmishes against the Hyksos and, judging from the vicious head wounds on his mummy in the Egyptian Museum in Cairo, may have died during one of them.

His son and successor Wadjkheperre Kamose, the last ruler of the Seventeenth Dynasty at Thebes, is credited with launching a successful campaign in the Theban war of liberation against the Hyksos, although he is thought to have died in the campaign. His mother, Ahhotep I, is thought to have ruled as regent after the death of Kamose and continued the warfare against the Hyksos until Ahmose I, the second son of Seqenenre Tao and Ahhotep I, was old enough to assume the throne and complete the expulsion of the Hyksos and the unification of Egypt.

=== Monumental construction ===
The relatively short length of Seqenenre Tao's reign did not allow for the construction of many monumental structures, but it is known that he had built a new palace made of mud brick at Deir el-Ballas. On an adjacent hillside overlooking the river, the foundations of a building were found that were identified as having been a military observation post.

A relatively large amount of pottery known as Kerma-ware was found at the site, indicating that a large number of Kerma Nubians were resident at the site. It is thought that they were there as allies of the pharaoh in his wars against the Hyksos.

== Historical attestations ==
Seqenenre's existence is attested to by several artifacts that mention his name.

- Louvre E 15682 | A limestone statue of a seated man with the royal name of Seqenenre and owner Senior King's Son Ahmose (sꜣ-nsw smsw), given by his sister Great King's Daughter Ahmose (sꜣt-nsw wrt), also mentions Great King's Daughter and United with the White Crown, Ahhotep (sꜣt-nsw wrt, ẖnmt nfr ḥḏt).
- Karnak Sheikh Labib 87CL358 | At Karnak, a limestone round-topped stela was found with the royal name of Seqenenre belonging to King's Daughter Ahmose (cartouche).
- JE 21461 | At Dra Abu el-Naga, the Tomb of Hornakht, a throw-stick with the royal name of Seqenenre and King's Son Tjuiu (ṯwjw) was found.

== Death ==
=== Burial ===
The Tomb of Seqenenre Tao has not been located, but is believed to be in the Dra' Abu el-Naga' necropolis in the west opposite Thebes.

=== Mummy ===
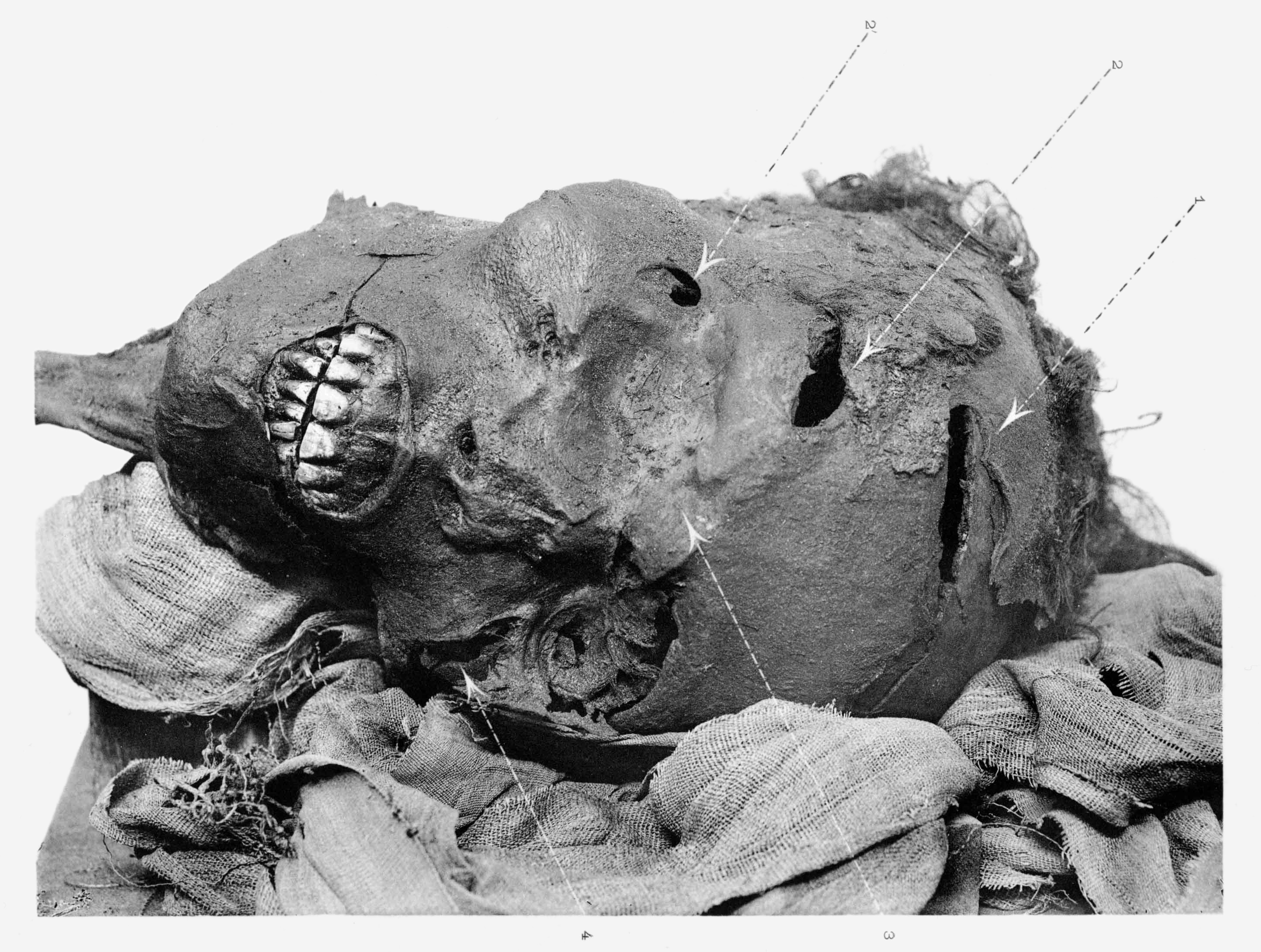
Mummified head of Seqenenre depicting his wounds. The cut above his eye was most probably made by some sort of dagger. The common theory is that he died in a battle against the Hyksos.

In the Deir el-Bahri cache, the mummy of Seqenenre was discovered in 1881. Priests had interred his mummy in the cache, along with Ahmose I, Amenhotep I, Thutmose I, Thutmose II, Thutmose III, Ramesses I, Seti I, Ramesses II, and Ramesses IX of the later Eighteenth and Nineteenth Dynasty.

The mummy was unwrapped by Eugène Grébaut when Professor Gaston Maspero resigned his office of directorship on June 5, 1886, and was succeeded in the superintendency of excavations and Egyptian archeology by Grébaut. In the same month, Grébaut began the work of unbandaging the mummy of Seqenenre. The history of Seqenenre's reign and revolt against the Hyksos had been considered legendary, but from the wounds present on the body, it was concluded by Maspero that he had died in battle. During the same season, the mummy of Seti I was unbandaged, and also that of an anonymous prince.

Maspero provides a vivid description of the injury that was done to the pharaoh at his death:

...it is not known whether he fell upon the field of battle or was the victim of some plot; the appearance of his mummy proves that he died a violent death when about forty years of age. Two or three men, whether assassins or soldiers, must have surrounded and despatched him before help was available. A blow from an axe must have severed part of his left cheek, exposed the teeth, fractured the jaw, and sent him senseless to the ground; another blow must have seriously injured the skull, and a dagger or javelin has cut open the forehead on the right side, a little above the eye. His body must have remained lying where it fell for some time: when found, decomposition had set in, and the embalming had to be hastily performed as best it might.

The wound on his forehead was probably caused by a Hyksos axe and his neck wound was probably caused by a dagger while he was prone. There are no wounds on his arms or hands, which suggests he was not able to defend himself.

Until 2009, the main hypotheses had been that he died either in a battle against the Hyksos or was assassinated while sleeping. A reconstruction of his death by Egyptologist Garry J Shaw and archaeologist and weapons expert Robert Mason suggested a third, which they saw as the likeliest, that Seqenenre was executed by the Hyksos king Apepi. Garry J Shaw also analysed the arguments for the competing hypotheses and other physical, textual and statistical evidence concluding "that the most likely cause of Seqenenre's death is ceremonial execution at the hands of an enemy commander, following a Theban defeat on the battlefield."

His mummy appears to have been hastily embalmed. X-rays that were taken of the mummy in the late 1960s show that no attempt had been made to remove the brain or to add linen inside the cranium or eyes, both normal embalming practices for the time. In the opinion of James E. Harris and Kent Weeks, who undertook the forensic examination at the time the X-rays were taken, his mummy is the worst preserved of all the royal mummies held at the Egyptian Museum, and they noted that a "foul, oily smell filled the room the moment the case in which his body was exhibited was opened," which is likely due to the poor embalming process and the absence of the use of absorbing natron salts, leaving some bodily fluids in the mummy at the time of burial. Also, Harris and Weeks noted in 1973 that "his entire facial complex, in fact, is so different from other pharaohs (it is closest in fact to his son Ahmose) that he could be fitted more easily into the series of Nubian and Old Kingdom Giza skulls than into that of later Egyptian kings. Various scholars in the past have proposed a Nubian - that is, non-Egyptian-origin - for Seqenenre and his family, and his facial features suggest that this might indeed be true."

He was the earliest royal mummy on display in the revamped Royal Mummies Hall at the Egyptian Museum, Cairo.

In 2021, a CT scan of his mummy revealed that he died in his forties, possibly on a battlefield, while his deformed hands imply that he was possibly imprisoned with his hands tied, and his facial fractures correlated well with the Hyksos weapons.

In April 2021, his mummy was moved to the National Museum of Egyptian Civilization along with those of 17 other kings and four queens in an event termed the Pharaohs' Golden Parade.

== Legacy in modern literature ==
Seqenenre Tao appears in the historical novel Shadow Hawk by Andre Norton, in which he is murdered by priests allied with the Hyksos. The book focuses on an Egyptian officer leading Nubian troops in the service of the Theban kingdom.

The Hiram Key, a work of non-fiction by Christopher Knight and Robert Lomas, argues that Seqenenre Tao's death formed the basis of the Hiram Abiff legend in Freemasonry; however, this thesis is not widely accepted and the book has been criticized as pseudohistory.
