= Ahmose-Henutemipet =

Egyptian princess

- King's Daughter; King's Sister
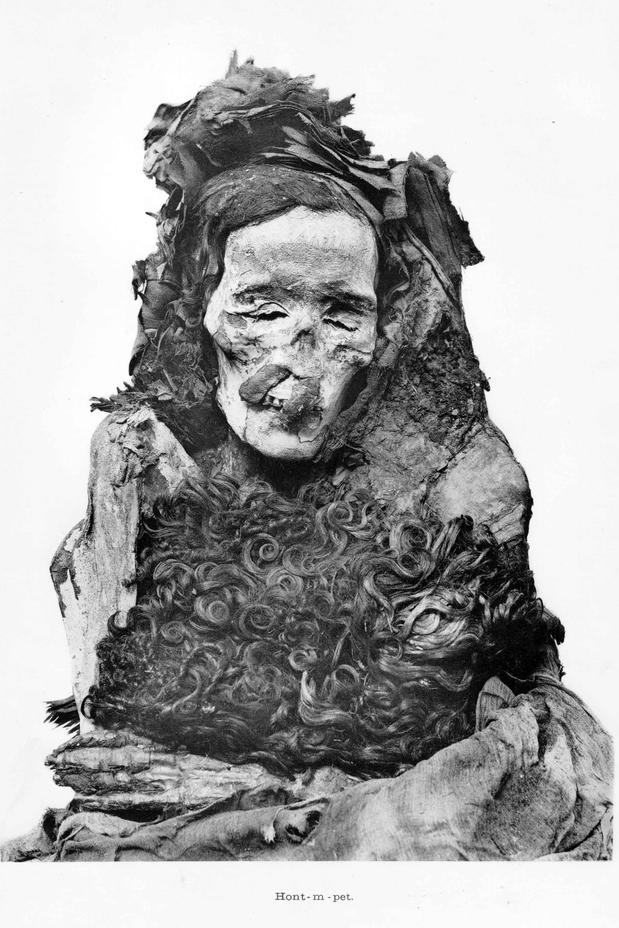
- Mummy of Ahmose-Henutemipet, found in DB320
- Born: 15xx BCE
- Died: 15xx BCE
- Burial: Unknown tomb, reburied in DB320
- Father: Seqenenre Tao
- Mother: probably Ahhotep I

Ahmose-Henutemipet was a princess of the late Seventeenth Dynasty of Egypt.

== Family ==
She is thought to be a daughter of Pharaoh Seqenenre Tao and probably Queen Ahhotep I. She was the sister of Ahmose I. She bore the titles King's Daughter and King's Sister.

== Death ==
=== Tomb ===
At Thebes, she may have had a tomb that has not been identified.

=== Mummy ===
Her mummy was found in the tomb DB320 in 1881 and now is in the Egyptian Museum in Cairo. It was examined by Grafton Elliot Smith in June 1909. Henutemipet died as an old woman; she had grey hair and worn teeth. Her mummy was damaged, probably by tomb robbers. It is likely that the mummy was moved to DB320 after Year 11 of Pharaoh Shoshenq I.
