= Ahmose-Henuttamehu =

Ancient Egyptian queen

- Queen consort of Egypt; Great Royal Wife
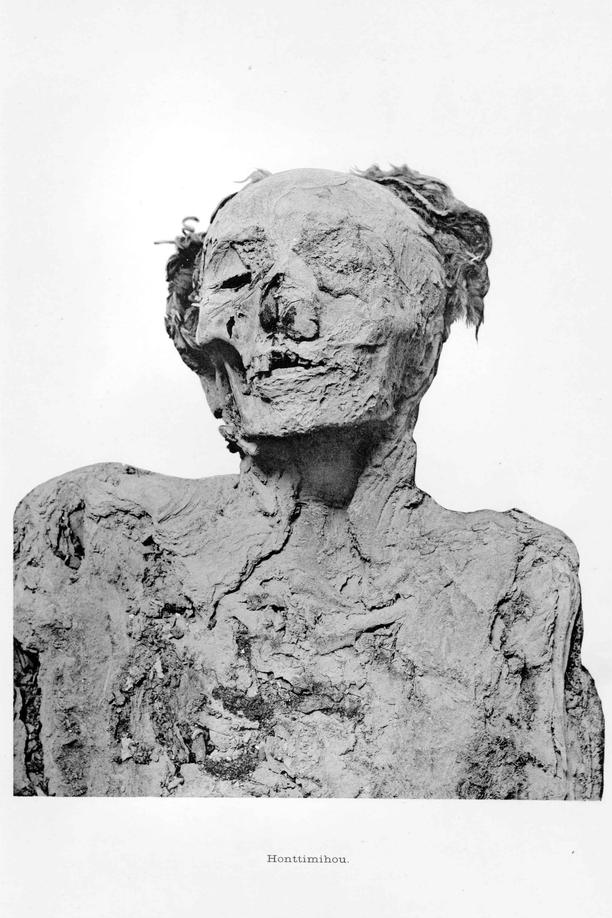
- Mummy of Ahmose-Henuttamehu, found in DB320
- Born: Thebes?
- Died: Thebes
- Burial: Thebes, eventually in DB320
- Spouse: Ahmose I
Egyptian name
N12 ms H W24 t tA M15
- Dynasty: 18th of Egypt
- Father: Seqenenre Tao
- Mother: Ahmose Inhapy
- Religion: Ancient Egyptian religion

Ahmose-Henuttamehu ("Child of the Moon; Mistress of Lower Egypt") was a princess and queen of the late 17th-early 18th dynasties of Egypt.

== Family ==
Ahmose-Henuttamehu was a daughter of Pharaoh Seqenenre Tao by his sister-wife Ahmose Inhapy. She was probably married to her half-brother Pharaoh Ahmose I, since her titles include King's Wife (hmt-nisw), Great King's Wife (hmt-niswt-wrt), King's Daughter (s3t-niswt) and King's Sister (snt-niswt). Ahmose-Henuttamehu was a half-sister to the Great Royal Wife and God's Wife of Amun Ahmose-Nefertari.

== Life and burial ==
Not much is known about the life of Ahmose-Henuttamehu. The Queen is mentioned on a stela as depicted in Lepsius' Denkmäler.

Ahmose-Henuttamehu's mummy was discovered in 1881 in her own coffin in the tomb DB320 and is now in the Egyptian Museum in Cairo. It was examined by Gaston Maspero in December 1882. Henuttamehu was an old woman when she died, with worn teeth. Quotes from the Book of the Dead were written on her mummy bandages. She was probably buried together with her mother; her mummy was taken to DB320 along with other mummies after Year 11 of Pharaoh Shoshenq I.

Ahmose-Henuttamehu is included in the list of royal ancestors worshipped in the Nineteenth Dynasty. She appears in the tomb of Khabekhnet in Thebes. In the top row, Prince Ahmose-Sipair appears on the left, and Ahmose-Henuttamehu appears as the fourth woman from the left, after the God's Wife and Lady of the Two Lands Ahmose, and the King's Wife Tures.

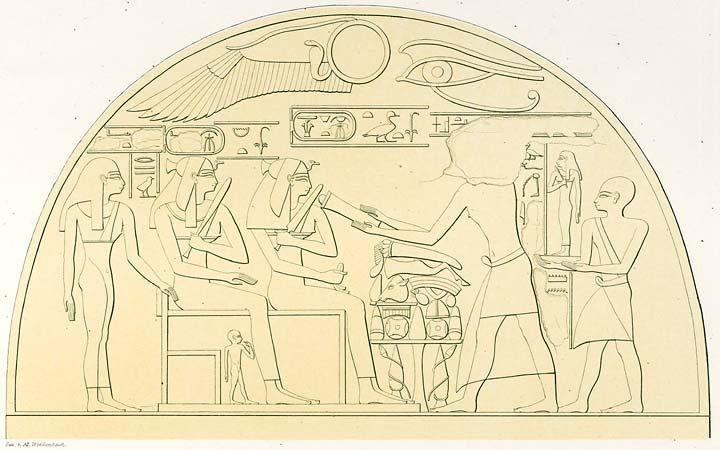
Ahmose-Henuttamehu is shown with another royal lady – possibly her mother Ahmose-Inhapi – behind her.

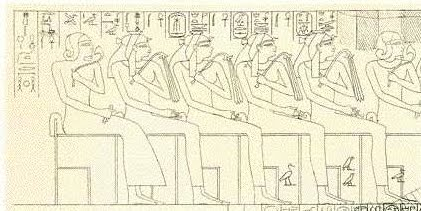
Prince Sipair, unknown royal lady, Queen Ahmose, Queen Tures, and Queen Henuttamehu – Tomb of Khabeknet in Thebes
