= Ahmose-Sitamun =

Princess of the Eighteenth Dynasty of Egypt

- God's Wife; King's Daughter; King's Sister
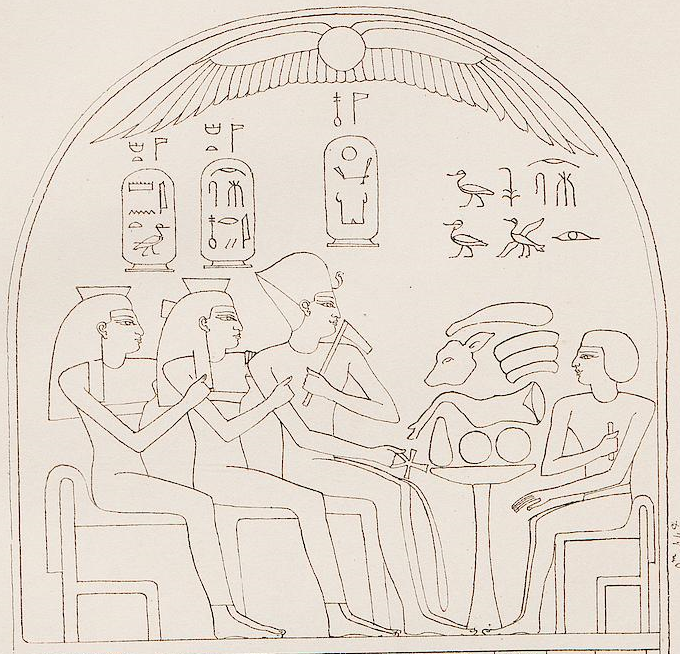
- Sitamun (far left) on a stele from Karnak
- Burial: Thebes
Egyptian name
iaH ms s i mn n G39 t
- Dynasty: 18th Dynasty
- Father: Ahmose I
- Mother: Ahmose-Nefertari

Ahmose-Sitamun or just Sitamun was a princess of the early Eighteenth Dynasty of Egypt.

== Etymology ==
Her name Ahmose-Sitamun (sꜣt-jmn; Sat-Amun/Satamun) means "Child of the Moon, Daughter of Amun".

== Biography ==
Sitamun was the daughter of Pharaoh Ahmose I and sister of Amenhotep I. Her titles were: King's Daughter (sꜣt-nsw); King's Sister (snt-nsw); God's Wife (ḥmt-nṯr) Her name was written in cartouche.

By Year 18 of Ahmose I (1570-1546 BC high chronology), her title string included King's Daughter and God's Wife. When her brother Amenhotep I (1545-1526 BC high chronology) became king, the title King's Sister was added to her title string.

== Attestations ==
=== Barracco 16 ===
A stela belonging to a subordinate of King's Daughter Satamun.

=== Hannover 1935.200.209 ===
A limestone stela dating to Year 18 of Ahmose I where she is King's Daughter and God's Wife.

=== Benson, Gourlay, Temple, 297-299 (IV), pl. XI (1) ===
At Karnak, a limestone statue stood before the eighth pylon at Karnak. On this mounument she holds the titles King's Daughter, King's Sister and God's Wife. The title King's Sister should date this monument to the reign of her brother, Amenhotep I.

== Death ==
The Tomb of Sitamun has not been identified. Her mummy was found in a secondary context.

=== Coffin of Sitamun ===
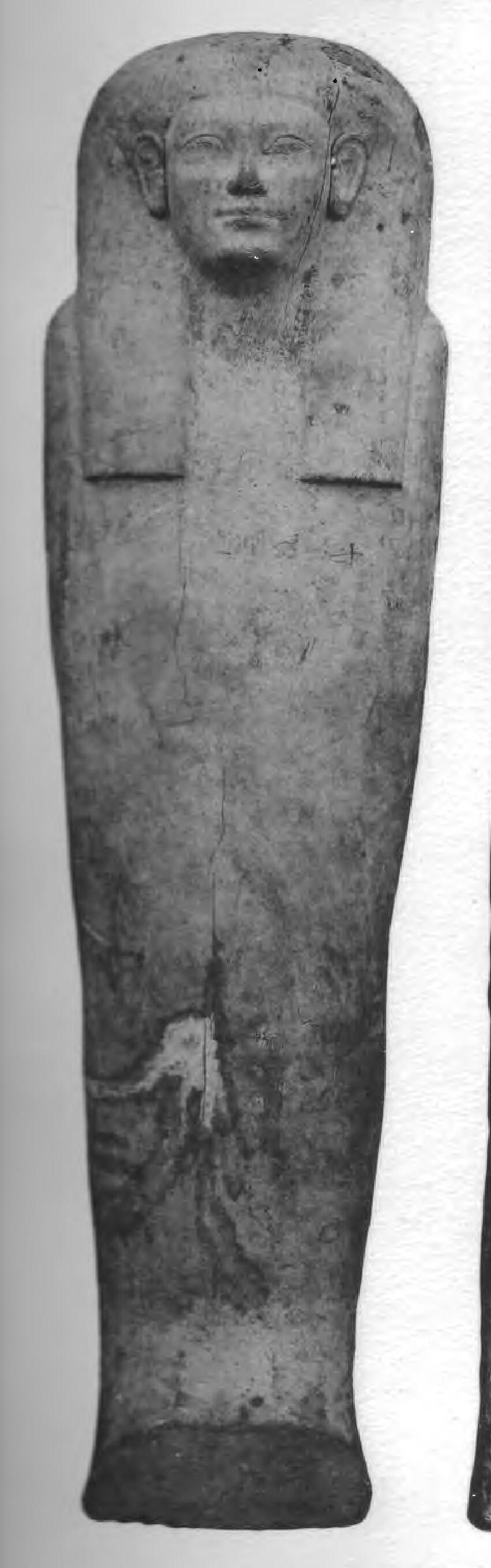
Sitamun's coffin

The Coffin of Sitamun has a length of 1.28 m.

=== Mummy, Cairo CG 61060 ===
The Mummy of Sitamun was identified by inscriptions on her wrapping and was found in the Deir el-Bahari cache (DB320) and is today in the Egyptian Museum, Cairo. Maspero apparently misidentified this mature woman as a child, because her skull and some bones were found in a child's coffin, along with a reed mat. Apparently, the mummy had been damaged and dismembered by ancient tomb robbers, and so when the priests collected what was left for her remains for a reburial, some care was taken to provide her with a new "body" by adding a reed mat and wrapping it along with the rest of her remains and placing the rewrapped mummy in a new coffin to ensure her continued existence in the afterlife. But in the process of rewrapping, the priests rewrapped her in a child size, rather than an adult size.

== Sources ==
- Aidan Dodson & Dyan Hilton: The Complete Royal Families of Ancient Egypt, Thames & Hudson, 2004, ISBN 0-500-05128-3, p. 129
