= Iah =

Ancient Egyptian deity

Name in hieroglyphs
M17 D36 V28 N11
- Symbol: The Moon

Iah (Ancient Egyptian: jꜥḥ; 𓇋𓂝𓎛𓇹, Coptic ⲟⲟϩ) is a lunar deity in ancient Egyptian religion. The word jꜥḥ simply means "Moon". It is also transcribed as Yah, Jah, Aa, or Aah.

== Worship ==
By the New Kingdom, (16th century to 11th century BC) Iah was less prominent than other gods with lunar connections, Thoth and Khonsu. As a result of the functional connection between them, he could be identified with either of those deities.

Iah was sometimes considered an adult form of Khonsu and was increasingly absorbed by him. He continued to appear in amulets and occasional other representations, similar to Khonsu in appearance, with the same lunar symbols on his head and occasionally the same tight garments. He differed in usually wearing a full wig instead of a child's sidelock, and sometimes the Atef topped by another symbol. As time went on, Iah also became Iah-Djehuty, meaning "god of the new moon". In this role, he assumed the lunar aspect of Thoth (also known as Djehuty), who was the god of knowledge, writing and calculation. The segments of the moon were also used as fractional symbols in writing.

Iah was also assimilated with Osiris, god of the dead, perhaps because, in its monthly cycle, the Moon appears to renew itself.

== See also ==
- Iah (queen)
- List of lunar deities
- Ra
- Yarikh
