= Ahmose Sapair =

Ancient Egyptian prince

Ahmose-Sapair
- Prince of Egypt
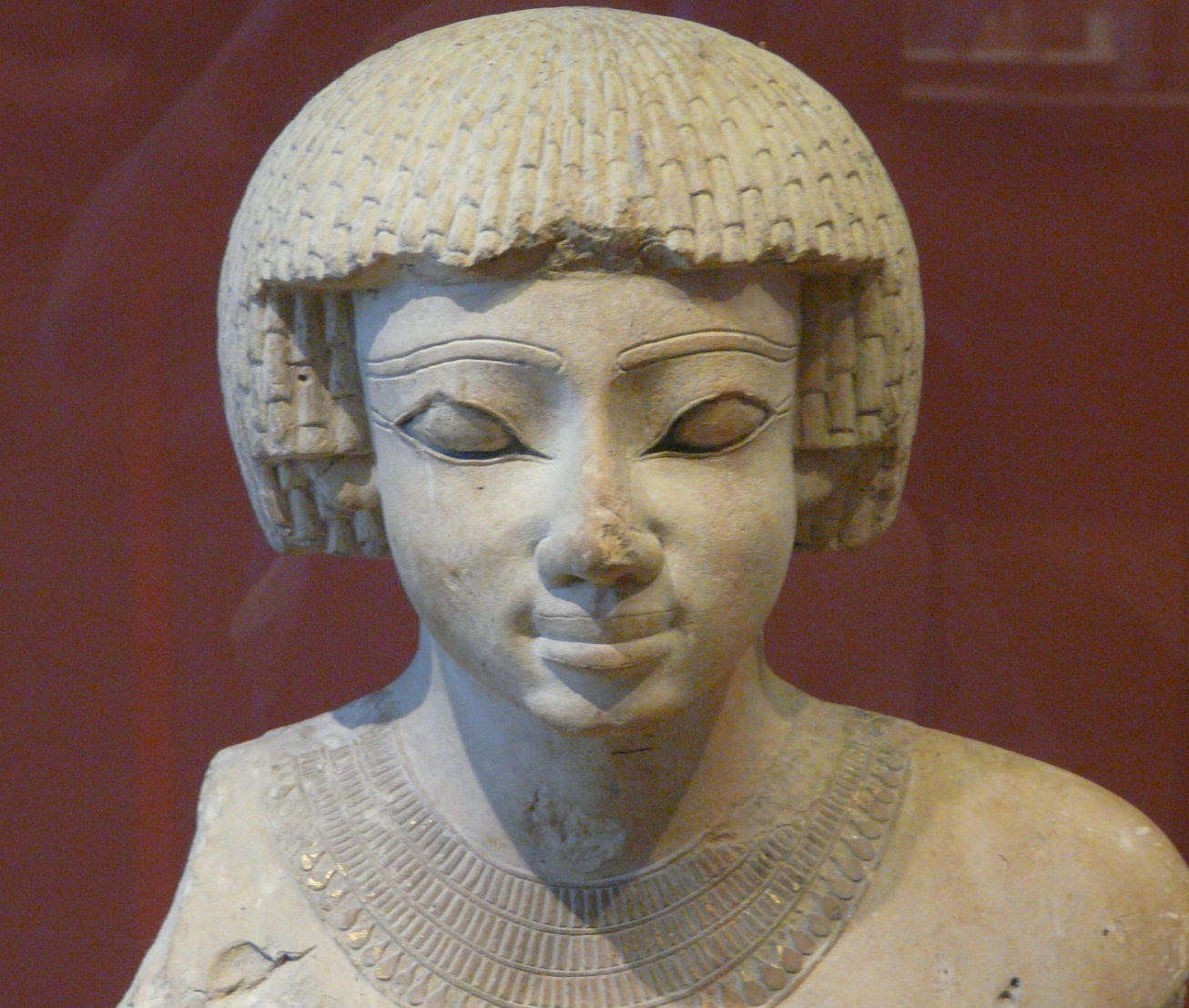
- Ahmose-Sapair at the Louvre (E 15682)
Egyptian name
iaH ms s G39 Z1 pA D4
- Dynasty: Seventeenth Dynasty of Egypt
- Pharaoh: Seqenenre Tao to Ahmose I
- Burial: Dra Abu el-Naga?, Thebes
- Father: Seqenenre Tao or Ahmose I

Ahmose-Sapair (also -Sipair) was a prince of the late Seventeenth Dynasty of Egypt (1580–1550 BCE).

== Family ==
He was probably a son of Pharaoh Seqenenre Tao and a brother of Ahmose I or the child of Ahmose I.

== Burial ==
At Dra Abu el-Naga, shabits and funerary linen belonging to Ahmose-Sapair has been found. However, the mummy identified as his is that of a 5- to 6-year-old boy. The mummy was found in the Deir el-Bahari cache (DB320) in 1881 and was unwrapped by Grafton Elliot Smith and A. R. Ferguson on September 9, 1905. The location of his tomb is unknown, however it was still known during the inspection of tombs from the Twentieth Dynasty mentioned on the Abbott Papyrus.
