= Papyrus Ambras =

Ancient Egyptian papyrus listing papyri

Papyrus Ambras is a papyrus which was formerly in the collection of Ambras Castle near Innsbruck, and is now a part of the collection of the Vienna Museum. The first to draw attention to it was the Egyptologist Heinrich Karl Brugsch, who published about it in 1876.

== Date ==
The papyrus stems from year 6 of the Whm Mswt or Renaissance, an era which started in year 19 of king Ramesses XI of the Twentieth Dynasty. In his year 19 this king started to count anew, with his year 19 either totally or partly coinciding with year 1 of the new era. Since some of the documents from the Whm Mswt are implicitly dated (i.e., without reference to the era), it is not always directly clear from the dateline whether a document stems from the ordinary year count of Ramesses XI or from the Whm Mswt. However, with Pap. Ambras there can be no doubt, since it explicitly mentions the Whm Mswt in its dateline.

== Content ==
Pap. Ambras is inscribed on the recto only and sums up the content of two jars filled with documents. It is clear that Ambras was meant as an inventory, probably to be stored with the jars themselves. The papyrus states that these documents had been bought back from the people, apparently after they had been stolen during the Suppression of the Theban High Priest of Amun, Amenhotep, which is supposed to have taken place just prior to the start of the Renaissance.

== Identification of the papyri ==
T. Eric Peet has suggested that several of the eight papyri from the second jar are to be identified as well known papyri concerning tomb robberies which have actually come down to us. He identified:

-[ recto 2.2-3 ]: Pap. BM 10068, recto

-[ recto 2.4 ]: Pap. Abbott (“The examination of the Pyramid-tombs”)

-[ recto 2.5-6 ]: Pap. BM 10054

-[ recto 2.7 ]: Pap. Leopold II-Amherst (“The examination concerning the pyramid of the King of Upper Egypt Sekhemre’shedtaui”)

-[ recto 2.8-9 ]: (not identified)

-[ recto 2.10 ]: Pap. BM 10053, recto

-[ recto 2.11 ]: (not identified)

-[ recto 2.12 ]: (not identified)

In 2000 Ad Thijs published an article in which he drew renewed attention to the observations of Peet. His identifications differ slightly from those of Peet:

-[ recto 2.2-3 ]: Pap. BM 10068, recto

-[ recto 2.4 ]: Pap. Abbott, but possibly not the copy which survived

-[ recto 2.5-6 ]: (not identified)

-[ recto 2.7 ]: Pap. Leopold II-Amherst

-[ recto 2.8-9 ]: (not identified)

-[ recto 2.10 ]: Pap. BM 10053, recto

-[ recto 2.11 ]: Pap. BM 10054, the list of thieves contained on verso 5-6

-[ recto 2.12 ]: perhaps Pap. Mayer B (?)

== Chronological significance ==
All these documents, c.q. texts stem from the first wave of tomb-robbery trials which took place in year 16 and 17 of Ramesses IX. However, as Peet noted, the verso of both Pap. BM 10068 and Pap. BM 10053 contains additional entries which are not described in Pap. Ambras:

- on the verso of Pap. BM 10068 we find two lists, commonly known as the “list of houses”, from an anonymous year 12 and the “Šrmt-list” of which the date has not been filled in, but which must be slightly later than the “list of houses” due to the placing of the columns of text on the papyrus.
- on the verso of Pap. BM 10053 we find a text, dating from an anonymous year 9, dealing with thefts from the mortuary temples of Ramesses II and Ramesses III. It is more than likely that these thefts could only have taken place during the chaotic period when the High Priest of Amun, Amenhotep, was temporarily suppressed by the Viceroy of Kush Pinehesy.

These additional entries on the verso are important texts in themselves and should have been included in the inventory. From this, Peet concluded that these entries were added only after the repurchase of the papyri in year 6 of the Whm Mswt. This would mean that the dates of the "list of houses" (year 12) and the "Šrmt-list" (year 12 or later) would become the highest known for the Whm Mswt. However, when Peet made his observations, it was still totally unclear where the Whm Mswt should be placed chronologically, so he could never press his case and his observations were more or less forgotten.

When the start of the Whm Mswt finally became (correctly) dated to year 19 of Ramesses XI, the texts on the verso’s of Pap. BM 10053 and 10068 became ascribed to the part of the reign of Ramesses XI prior to his proclamation of the Whm Mswt.
