= Khaemwaset (vizier) =

Ancient Egyptian vizier of Ramesses IX

- Vizier of the South
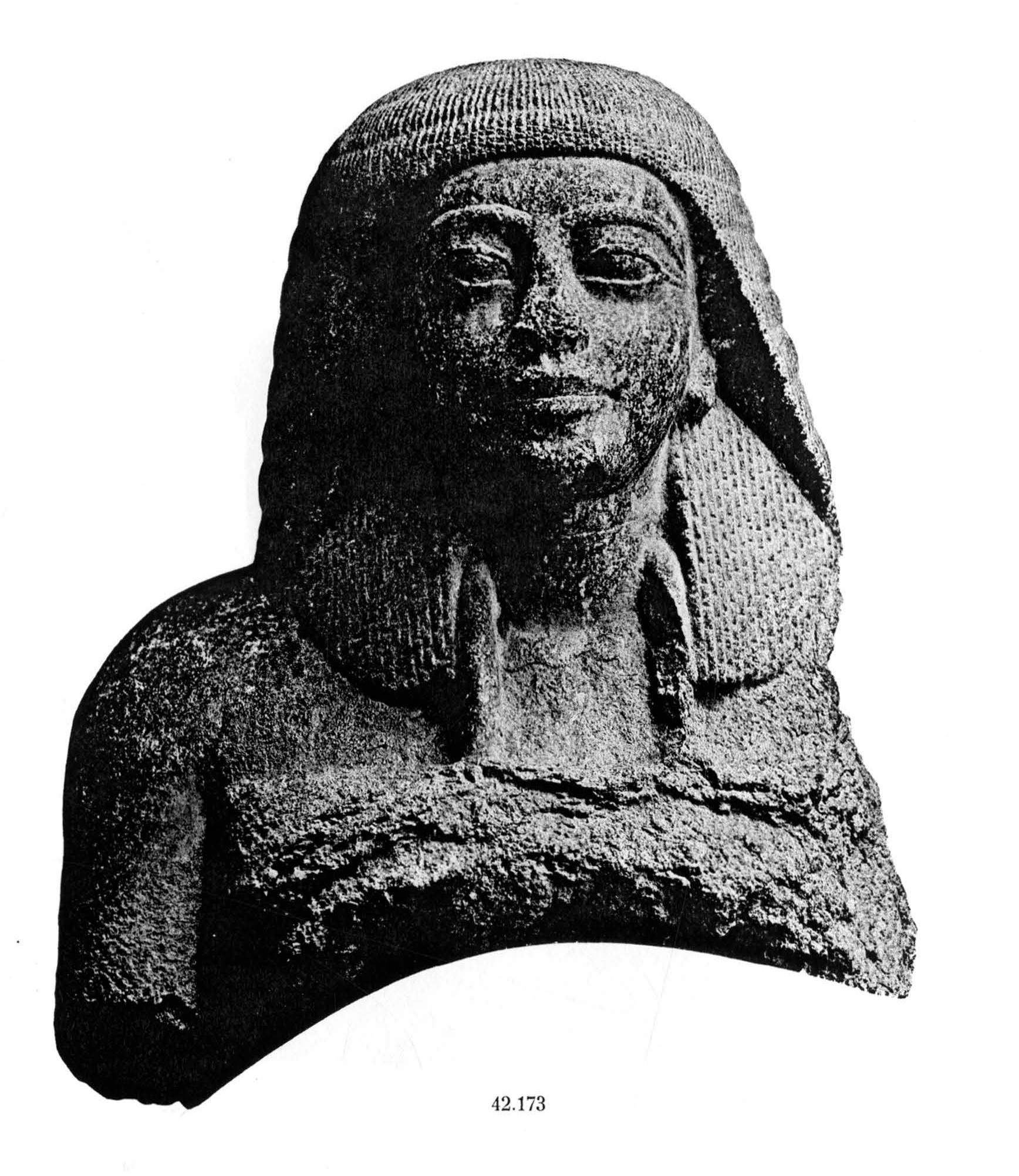
- Statue fragment of vizier Khaemwaset
Egyptian name
N28 D36 Y1V G17 S40 X1 O49Ḫˁj m W3st
"He who appears in Thebes"
- Predecessor: Nebmarenakht
- Successor: Nebmarenakht (again)
- Dynasty: 20th Dynasty
- Pharaoh: Ramesses IX

Khaemwaset was an ancient Egyptian vizier of the South, governor of Thebes, and possibly also High Priest of Ptah during the reign of pharaohs Ramesses IX of the 20th Dynasty.
He is mainly known for being the vizier who ordered and led the investigation into the royal tomb robberies which occurred under Ramesses IX.

== Biography ==
Khaemwaset was the successor of vizier Nebmarenakht in Year 14 of Ramesses IX. In Year 16 he was informed about some irregularities in the Theban Necropolis and he decided to start an investigation which ultimately led to the discovery of several grave robbers. The entire story is reported on the Abbott Papyrus, Amherst Papyrus, and Mayer Papyri. However, on the slightly later Mayer Papyri the vizier was again Nebmarenakht: it seems that for some reasons unknown to us, Nebmarenakht was indeed restored during Year 17 of Ramesses IX.

Besides the Abbott Papyrus and Amherst Papyrus, both dated to Year 16, Khaemwaset is known from the upper part of a granite statue depicting him, now at the Cairo Museum (CG 42173 / JE 36650), and from few West-Theban graffiti (nos. 110, 111 and 113).

== See also ==
- The Robbery of Sobekemsaf's Tomb
- Paweraa
