= Tomb ANB =

Sepulchre near Thebes, Egypt

Tomb AN B
- Burial site of Possibly Amenhotep I and Ahmose-Nefertari
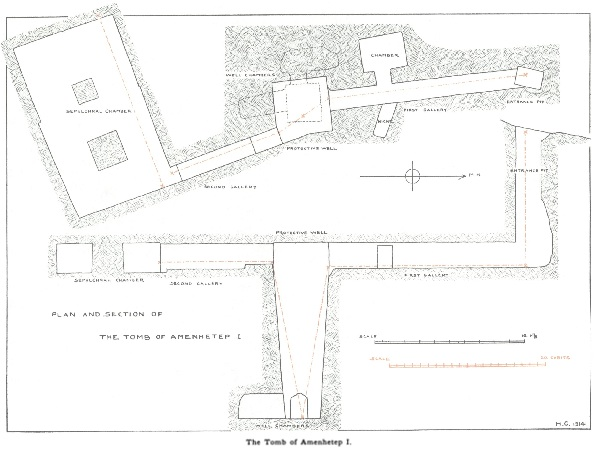
- Floor plan of the tomb. From the report by Howard Carter (1916)

- Location within Egypt
- Coordinates: 25°41′54.9″N 32°34′16.5″E
- Location: Dra' Abu el-Naga',
- Discovered: 1914
- Excavated by: Howard Carter

Tomb ANB is a sepulchre located in the west of the necropolis of Dra' Abu el-Naga', near Thebes, Egypt. It may well have been intended as the burial place of the 18th Dynasty Pharaoh Amenhotep I and his mother Ahmose-Nefertari.

The tomb was initially attributed to Amenhotep I by Howard Carter. In the article he does mention that in the scattered debris of the tomb there are as many inscriptions mentioning Ahmose-Nefertari as there are mentioning Amenhotep I so it may be that both had been buried in the tomb. In Porter and Moss the tomb is attributed to Ahmose-Nefertari based on an argument by Černý.

== The tomb ==
The tomb is located on a plateau in the foothills of Dra' Abu el-Naga'. The tomb opens up to a deep pit at the entrance. The possibility that the tomb entrance was once covered by a pyramid can not be ruled out. Behind the pit is a gallery extending into the rock. Halfway down the gallery is a chamber on one side and a niche on the other. The gallery ends in a very deep protective well. This feature later became common in royal tombs. The well may have served a double purpose. It would have protected the tomb from floods during the rainy seasons, and provided the royal occupant with an access to the underworld. The protective well has two chambers at the bottom. These chambers may have served as a false tomb to throw off potential tomb robbers. Beyond the well is a second gallery which leads to the burial chamber. This final chamber is rectangular in shape and features two pillars.

== Finds ==
A basalt bust of a woman, who may be Ahmose-Nefertari, though stylistically dates to a later point in the New Kingdom, was discovered in the tomb. The statue is now in the Metropolitan Museum of Art (M.M.A. 21.7.9). Fragments of stone vessels with inscriptions of Ahmose I, Ahmose-Nefertari and Amenhotep I (M.M.A.21.7.1-8.) where found in the tomb, as well as a fragment inscribed for King Apepi and a daughter named Herti. (M.M.A. 21.7.7)

== The Abbott Papyrus and the tomb of Amenhotep I ==
The Abbott Papyrus is a record of tomb robberies from the time of Ramesses IX. The tomb of Amenhotep I is mentioned in the papyrus. It was said to have been inspected and found untouched.

The eternal horizon of King Zeser-ka-ra, L.P.H., Son of Ra, Amenhetep, L.P.H., which is 120 cubits deep from its superstructure, which is called: "The-High-Ascent" north of the House-of- Amenhetep-L.P.H.-of-the-Garden concerning which the Mayor of the City, Paser, had reported to the Governor of the City and Vizier, Khaemuas;... and the great nobles, saying: "the thieves have broken into it." Inspected on this day; it was found uninjured by the thieves

Carter goes on to measure the dimensions of the tomb. He included both the descent into the well and the ascent from the well in the length of the tomb and comes to 120 cubits. Thereby claiming that Tomb AN B matches the dimensions of the tomb of Amenhotep I as mentioned in the papyrus. Černý later conjectures that the 'House of Amenhotep of the Garden' is to be identified with the now destroyed temple of Amenhotep I located in Deir-el-Bahari. Given that Amenhotep I's tomb is said to be located to the north of this temple, Černý concluded that the tomb was still to be discovered and should not be equated with Tomb AN B.

== See also ==
- List of Theban Tombs
