= T. Eric Peet =

British Egyptologist (1882–1934)

Thomas Eric Peet (12 August 1882, Liverpool – 22 February 1934, Oxford) was an English Egyptologist.

== Biography ==
Thomas Eric Peet (professionally he used the form T. Eric Peet) was the son of Thomas and Salome Peet. He was educated at Merchant Taylors' School, Crosby and at Queen's College, Oxford. From 1909 onwards he conducted excavations in Egypt for the Egypt Exploration Fund. From 1913 to 1928, he was lecturer in Egyptology at Manchester University, though he also saw service in World War I as a lieutenant in the King's Regiment (Liverpool). From 1920 to 1933, he was Brunner Professor of Egyptology at the University of Liverpool. In 1933 he was appointed Reader in Egyptology at the University of Oxford. The Queen's College, Oxford, houses the university's Egyptology library, and it is named the Peet Library in his honor.

== Works ==
- The Stone and Bronze Ages in Italy and Sicily, Oxford: Clarendon Press, 1909
- Rough Stone Monuments and their Builders, London: Harper & Brothers, 1912
- The Mayer Papyri A & B, Nos. M11162 and M11186 of the Free Public Museums, Liverpool, London: Egypt Exploration Society, 1920 (see also Mayer Papyri)
- The Cemeteries of Abydos. Part II. 1911–1912, London: Egypt Exploration Society, 1914
- The Inscriptions of Sinai (in collaboration with Alan H. Gardiner), London: Egypt Exploration Society, 1917
- Egypt and the Old Testament, London: Hodder & Stoughton for Liverpool University Press, 1922
- The City of Akhenaten: Excavations of 1921 and 1922 at El-'Amarneh, (in collaboration with C Leonard Woolley), London: Egypt Exploration Society, 1923
- The Rhind Mathematical Papyrus: British Museum 10057 and 10058, London: Hodder & Stoughton for Liverpool University Press, 1923 (see also Rhind Mathematical Papyrus)
- The Great Tomb-Robberies of the Twentieth Egyptian Dynasty: Being a critical study, with translations and commentaries, of the papyri in which these are recorded, Oxford: Clarendon Press, 1930 (see also Abbott Papyrus)
- A Comparative Study of the Literatures of Egypt, Palestine, and Mesopotamia. Egypt's Contribution to the Literature of the Ancient World, London: H. Milford, Oxford University Press, 1931 (Schweich Lectures for 1929)
