= Paweraa =

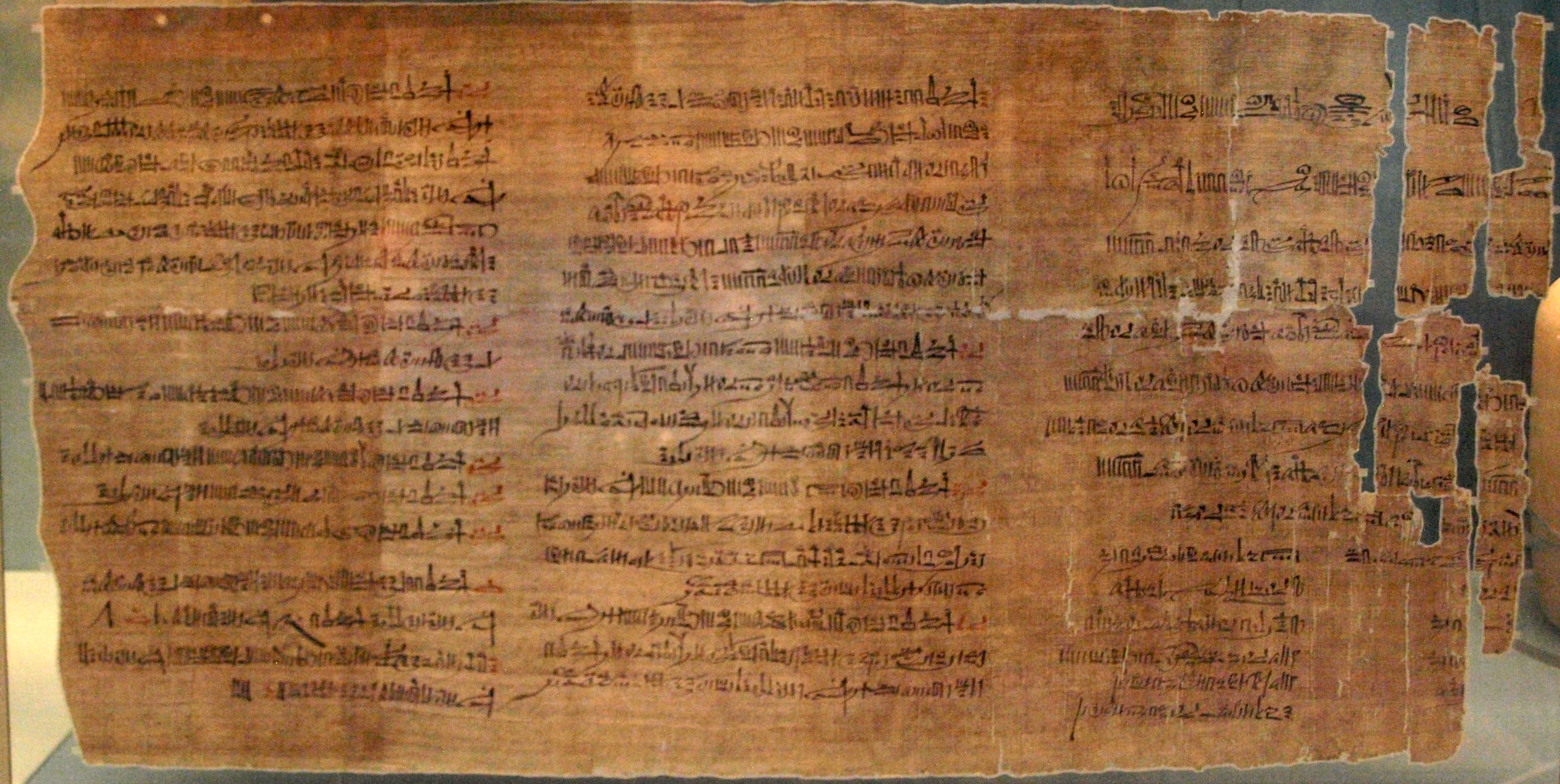
The Abbott Papyrus contains some of the facts concerning Paweraa

Paweraa (alt. Pewero) was the Mayor of Western Thebes during a series of tomb robberies that occurred in the Valley of the Kings during the late New Kingdom of Ancient Egypt. In official transcripts of a Tomb Robbery report from Year 16 of Ramesses IX, Paweraa was accused by Paser, the Mayor of Eastern Thebes, of either being involved in the series of Tomb robberies or being negligent in his duties in protecting the royal tombs from incursions by marauding Libyan bands or conventional Egyptian tomb robbers. The vizier Khaemwaset ordered an investigation by a commission of which Paweraa himself was the head. The investigation was considered corrupt by the people of Deir el-Medina. In the ensuing trial seventeen workmen from near-by temples were convicted and executed. Paweraa, however, was never charged due to the lack of clear evidence of his guilt. He continued to serve in office while Paser, his accuser, vanished from history, and the robberies continued.

Paweraa later appears in the House-list papyrus which dates to Year 12 of the pre-Whm Mswt era of Ramesses XI.

The events surrounding the investigation have been dramatised in the second episode of the British docutainment serial Ancient Egyptians.
