= Amenhotep I =

Second Pharaoh of the Eighteenth dynasty of Egypt

- Amenophis I, Amenôthes I
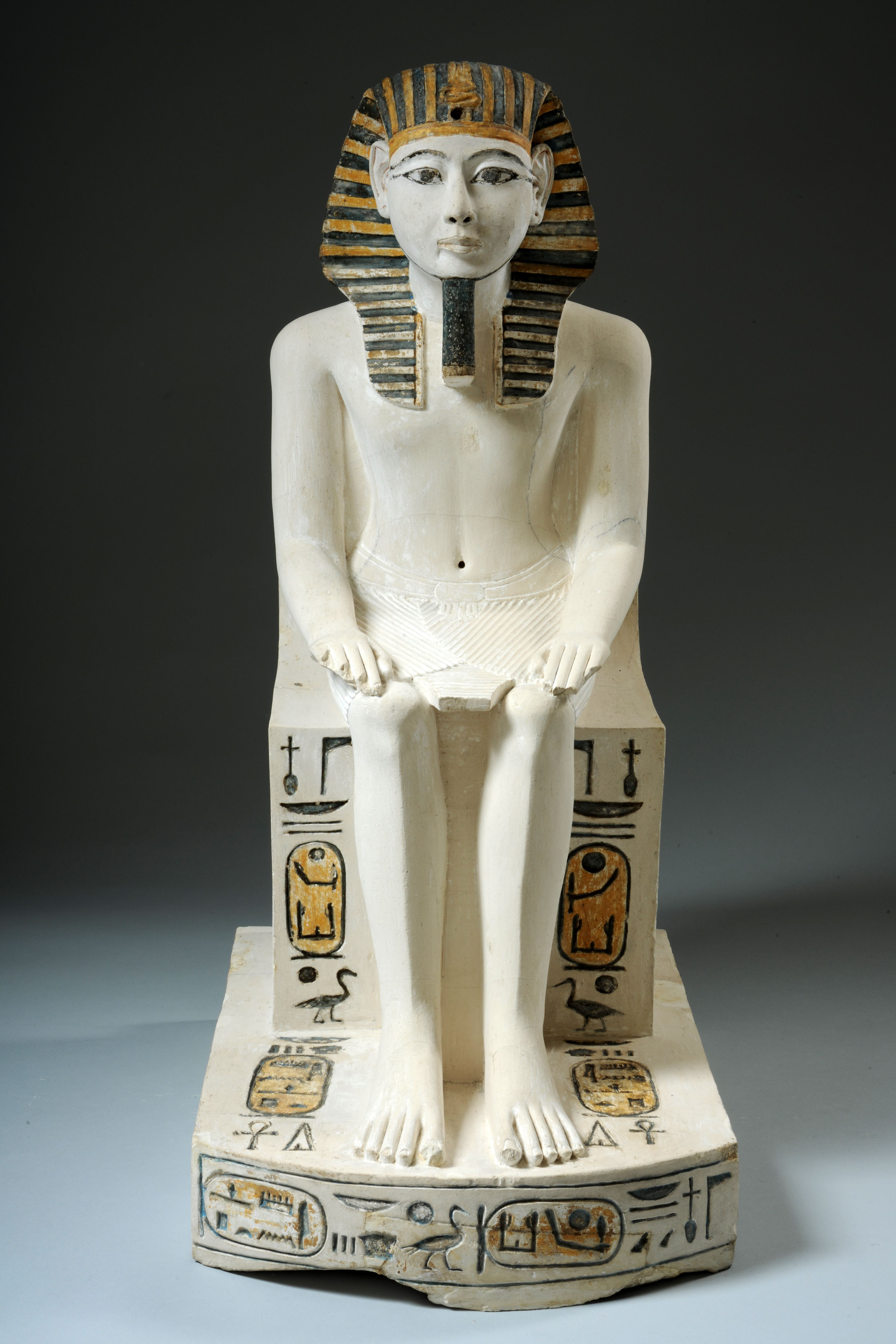
- Cult statue of Amenhotep I now in the Museo Egizio in Turin, Italy

Pharaoh
- Reign: 20 regnal years 1545–1526 BC (high chr.); 1525–1506 BC (low chr.); 20 years, 7 months (Manetho)
- Predecessor: Ahmose I
- Successor: Thutmose I
Royal titulary
Horus name
Ka waf tau
KꜢ wꜤf tꜢw
Bull who has subdued the lands
G5	E1 G43 D36 I9 N16 N16 N16
Nebty name
Aa neru
ꜤꜢ-nrw
He who inspires great fear
Great of dread
G16	O29 n r H4 G43
Golden Horus
Wah renput
WꜢḥ-rnpwt
Enduring of years
G8	V29 M4 M4 M4
Prenomen
Djeser ka re
Ḏsr-kꜢ-RꜤ
Holy is the soul of Ra

M23 X1 L2 X1	N5 D45 D28
Nomen
Imen hetepu
Imn ḥtp(w)
Amun is satisfied (Amenhotep)

G39 N5	i mn n R4 t p
- Consorts: Ahmose-Meritamun, Sitkamose?
- Children: Amenemhat, Thutmose I (possibly), Ahmose (possibly)
- Father: Ahmose I
- Mother: Ahmose-Nefertari
- Died: 1506 BC or 1504 BC (aged c. 35)
- Burial: Mummy found in Deir el-Bahri cache, but was likely originally buried in the Valley of the Kings (possibly KV39) or Dra' Abu el-Naga' (possibly Tomb ANB)
- Dynasty: 18th Dynasty

Amenhotep I (/ˌæmɛnˈhoʊtɛp/) (lit. '"Amun is satisfied"'), also known as Amenophis I (/əˈmɛnoʊfɪs/ from Ancient Greek Ἀμένωφις), was the second Pharaoh of the 18th Dynasty of Egypt. His reign is generally dated from 1526 to 1506 BC (Low Chronology).

He was a son of Ahmose I and Ahmose-Nefertari but had an elder brother, Ahmose-ankh, and was not expected to inherit the throne. However, sometime in the eight years between Ahmose I's 17th regnal year and his death, his heir apparent died and Amenhotep became crown prince. He then acceded to the throne and ruled for about 21 years.

Although his reign is poorly documented, it is possible to piece together a basic history from available evidence. He inherited the kingdom formed by his father's military conquests and maintained dominance over Nubia and the Nile Delta but probably did not attempt to maintain Egyptian power in the Levant. He continued the rebuilding of temples in Upper Egypt and revolutionized mortuary complex design by separating his tomb from his mortuary temple, setting a trend in royal funerary monuments which would persist throughout the New Kingdom. After his death, he was deified as a patron god of Deir el-Medina.

== Family ==
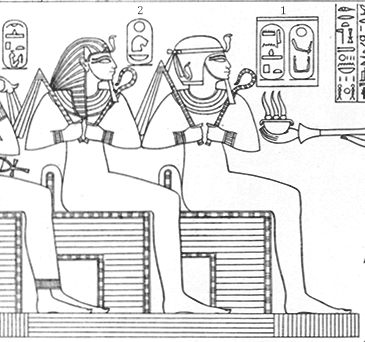
Ahmose I (left) and Amenhotep I as depicted in the Tomb of Inherkhau

Amenhotep I was the son of Ahmose I and Ahmose-Nefertari. His elder brother, the crown prince Ahmose-ankh, died before him, thus clearing the way for his ascension to the throne. Amenhotep probably came to power while he was still young himself, and his mother, Ahmose-Nefertari, appears to have been regent for him for at least a short time. The evidence for this regency is that both he and his mother are credited with founding a settlement for workers in the Theban Necropolis at Deir el-Medina. Amenhotep took his older sister, Ahmose-Meritamon, as his Great Royal Wife. Another wife's name, Sitkamose, is attested on a nineteenth dynasty stele.

Beyond this, the relationships between Amenhotep I and other possible family members are unclear. Ahhotep II is usually called his wife and sister, despite an alternative theory that she was his grandmother. He is thought to have had one son by Ahhotep II, Amenemhat, who died while still very young. This remains the consensus, although there are arguments against that relationship as well. With no living heirs, Amenhotep was succeeded by Thutmose I, whom he married to his presumed sister, Ahmose. Since Ahmose is never given the title "King's Daughter" in any inscription, some scholars doubt whether she was a sibling of Amenhotep I.

== Dates and length of reign ==
=== New Kingdom high and low chronology ===
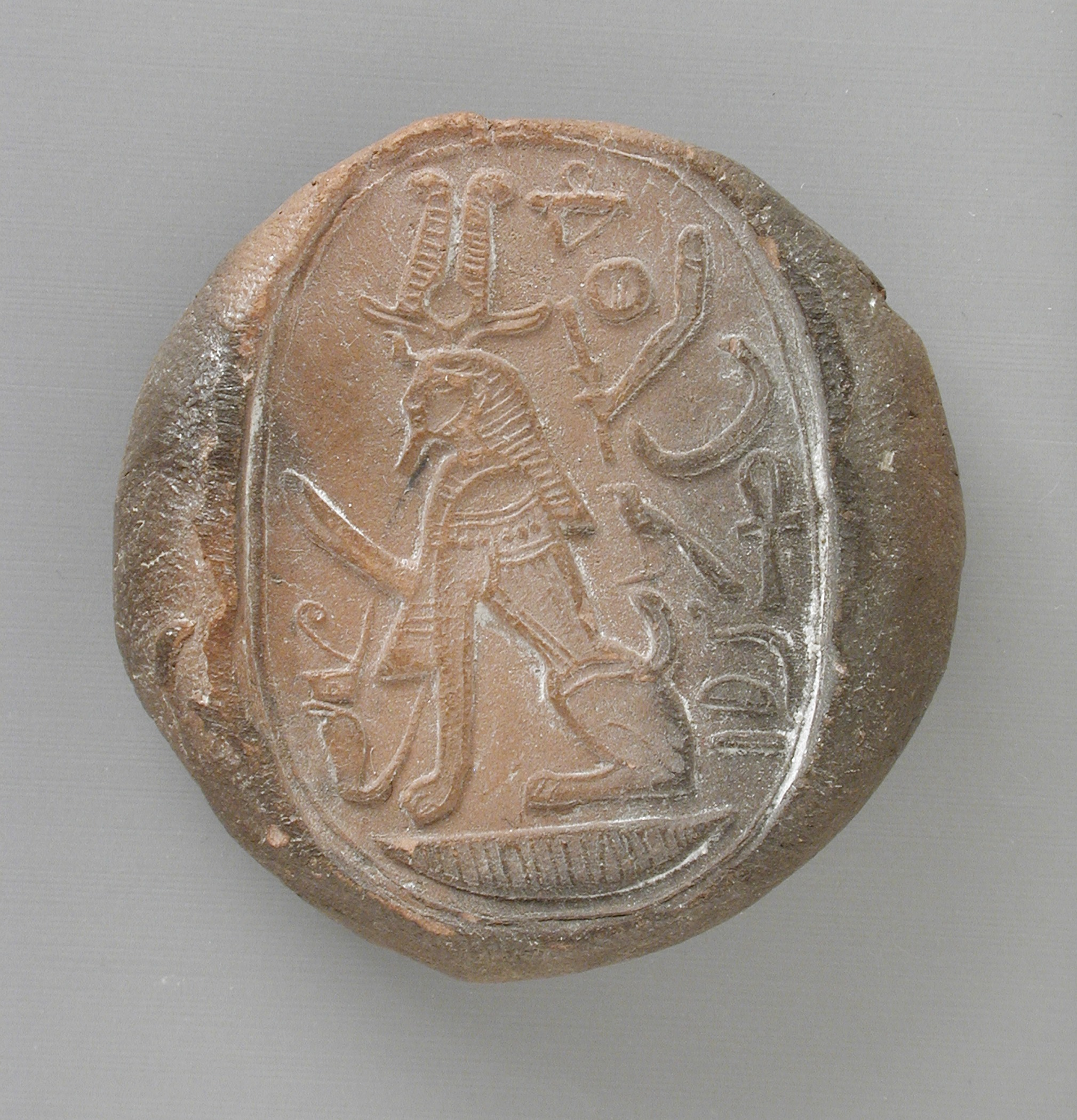
Mold with Royal Sphinx of Amenhotep I LACMA M.80.202.326

In Year 9 of Amenhotep, a heliacal rise of Sothis was observed on the ninth day of the third month of summer. Modern astronomers have calculated that, if the observation was made from Memphis or Heliopolis, the observation was made on that day in 1537 BC (NK High Chronology). If the observation was made in Thebes, then the event occurred on July 11, 1517 BC (NK Low Chronology). Consequently, the Heliacal rise of Sothis suggests the accession of Amenhotep I was either in 1546 (1545 Year 1) or 1526 BC (1525 Year 1). Because Thebes was the capital during the early 18th Dynasty, Egyptologists traditionally set the accession date in 1526 BC.

=== Reign length ===
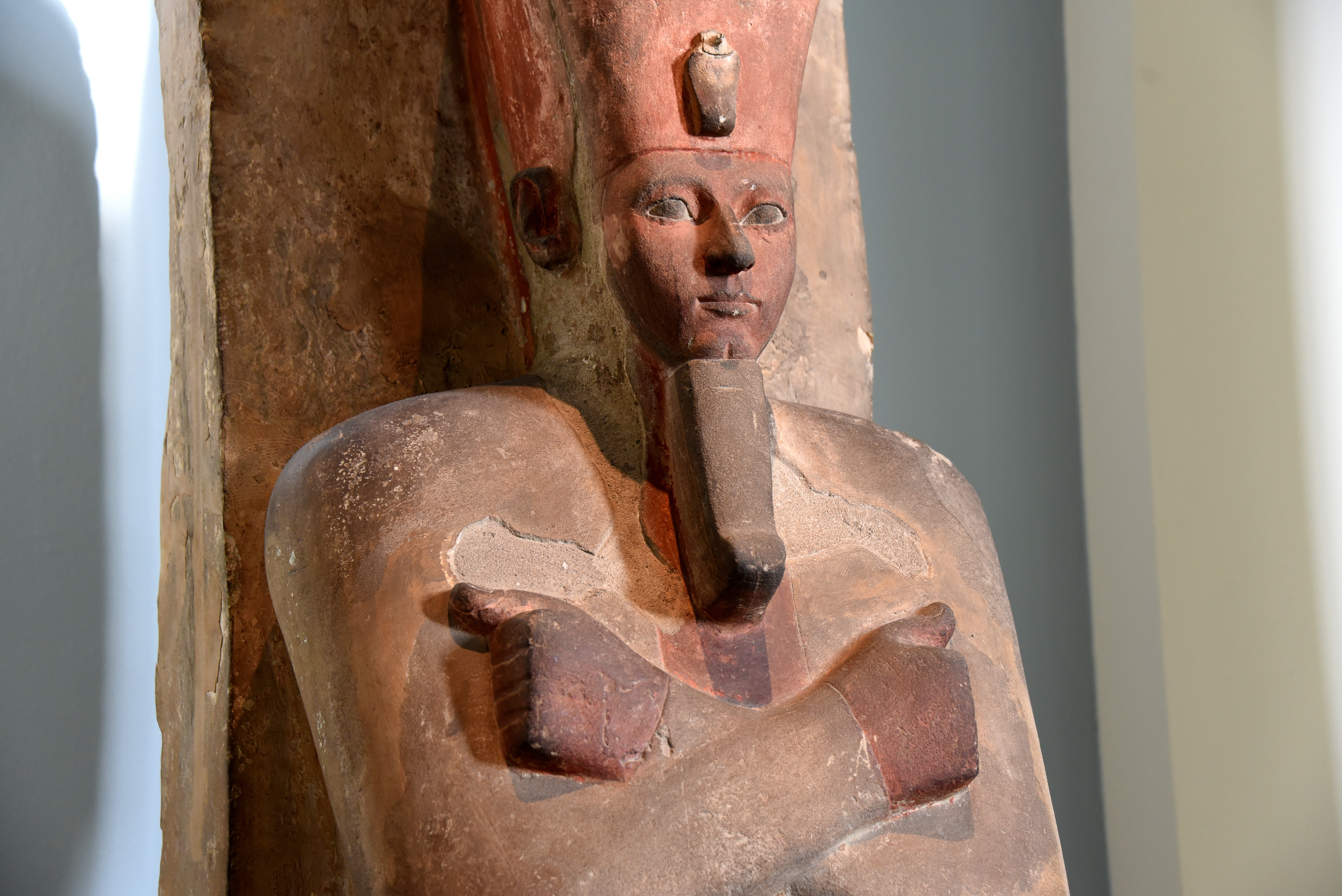
Osiride statue of Amenhotep I from his mortuary temple, originally found in the nearby mortuary temple of Mentuhotep II, now in the British Museum

Manetho's Epitome states that Amenhotep I ruled Egypt for twenty years and seven months or twenty-one years, depending on the source. While Amenhotep I's highest attested regnal year is only his Year 10, Manetho's statement is confirmed by a passage in the tomb autobiography of a magician named Amenemhet. This explicitly states that he served under Amenhotep I for 21 years. Thus, in the high chronology, Amenhotep I is given a reign from around 1546 to 1526 BC and, in the low chronology, from around 1526 to 1506 BC or 1525 to 1504 BC, though individual scholars may ascribe dates to his reign that vary from these by a few years.

== Foreign policy ==
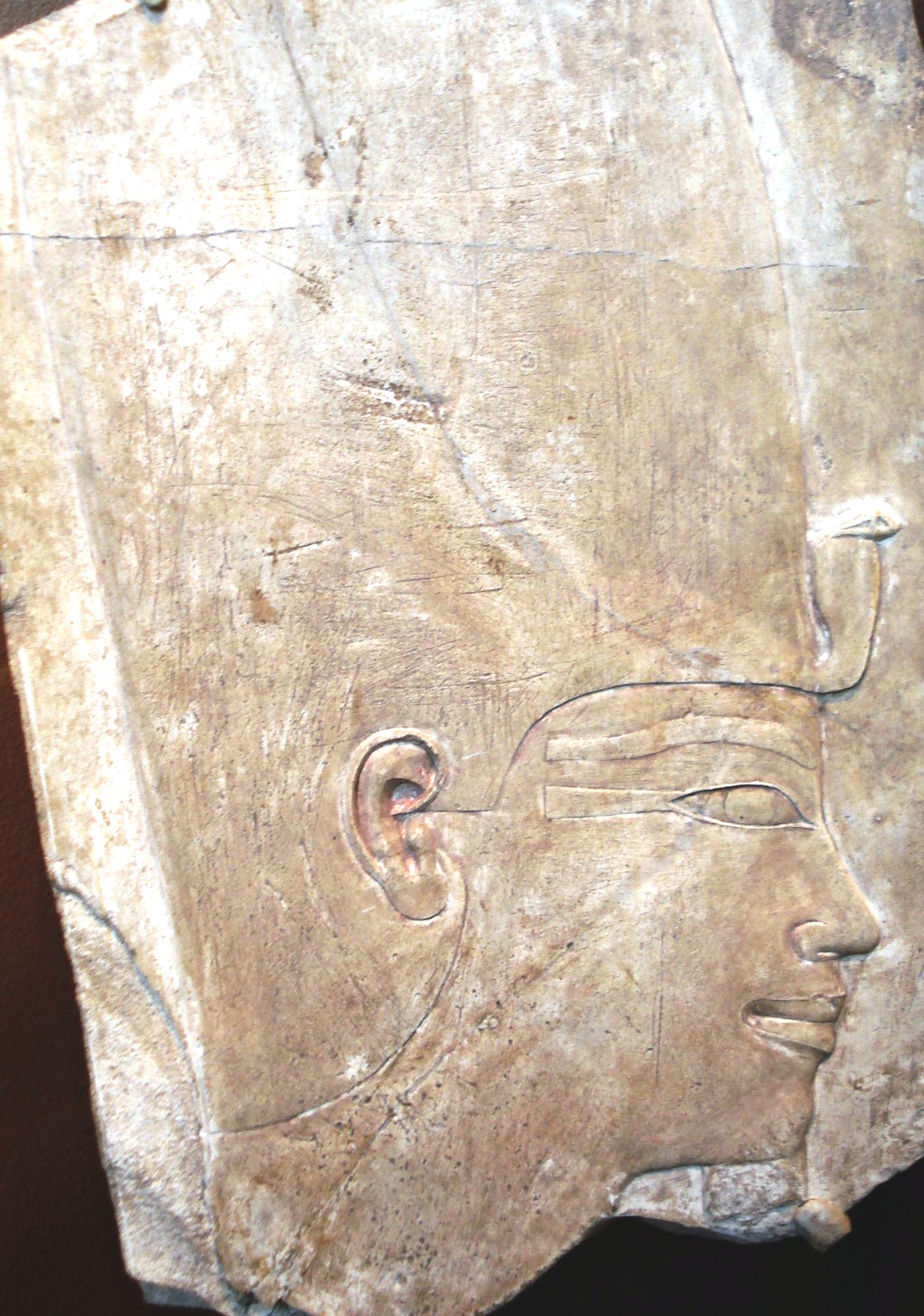
Relief of Amenhotep I from Karnak

Amenhotep I's Horus and Two Ladies names, "Bull who conquers the lands" and "He who inspires great terror", are generally interpreted to mean that Amenhotep I intended to dominate the surrounding nations. Two tomb texts indicate that he led campaigns into Nubia. According to the tomb texts of Ahmose, son of Ebana, Amenhotep later sought to expand Egypt's border southward into Nubia and he led an invasion force which defeated the Nubian army. The tomb biography of Ahmose Pen-Nekhebet says he also fought in a campaign in Kush; however, it is possible that it refers to the same campaign as Ahmose, son of Ebana. Amenhotep built a temple at Saï, showing that he had established Egyptian settlements almost as far as the Third Cataract.

A single reference in the tomb of Ahmose Pen-Nekhebet indicates another campaign in Iamu in the land of Kehek. However, the location of Kehek is unknown. It was long believed that Kehek was a reference to the Libyan tribe, Qeheq, and thus it was postulated that invaders from Libya took advantage of the death of Ahmose to move into the western Nile Delta. Unfortunately for this theory, the Qeheq people only appeared in later times, and Kehek's identity remains unknown. Nubia is a possibility, since Amenhotep did campaign there, and the western desert and the oases have also been suggested, since these seem to have fallen under Egyptian control once again.

Egypt had lost the western desert and the oases during the Second Intermediate Period, and during the revolt against the Hyksos, Kamose thought it necessary to garrison them. It is uncertain when they were fully retaken, but on one stele, the title "Prince-Governor of the oases" was used, which means that Amenhotep's reign forms the terminus ante quem for the return of Egyptian rule.

There are no recorded campaigns in Syro-Palestine during Amenhotep I's reign. However, according to the Tombos Stela of his successor, Thutmose I, when Thutmose led a campaign into Asia all the way to the Euphrates, he found no one who fought against him. If Thutmose did not lead a campaign which has not been recorded into Asia before this recorded one, it would mean that the preceding pharaoh would have had to pacify Syria instead, which would indicate a possible Asiatic campaign of Amenhotep I. Two references to the Levant potentially written during his reign might be contemporary witnesses to such a campaign. One of the candidates for Amenhotep's tomb contains a reference to Qedmi, which is somewhere in Canaan or the Transjordan, and Amenemhet's tomb contains a hostile reference to Mitanni. However, neither of these references necessarily refer to campaigning, nor do they even necessarily date to Amenhotep's reign. The location of Amenhotep's tomb is not certain, and Amenemhet lived to serve under multiple kings who are known to have attacked Mitanni. Records from Amenhotep's reign are too scant and too vague to reach a conclusion about any Syrian campaign.

== Cultural and intellectual developments ==
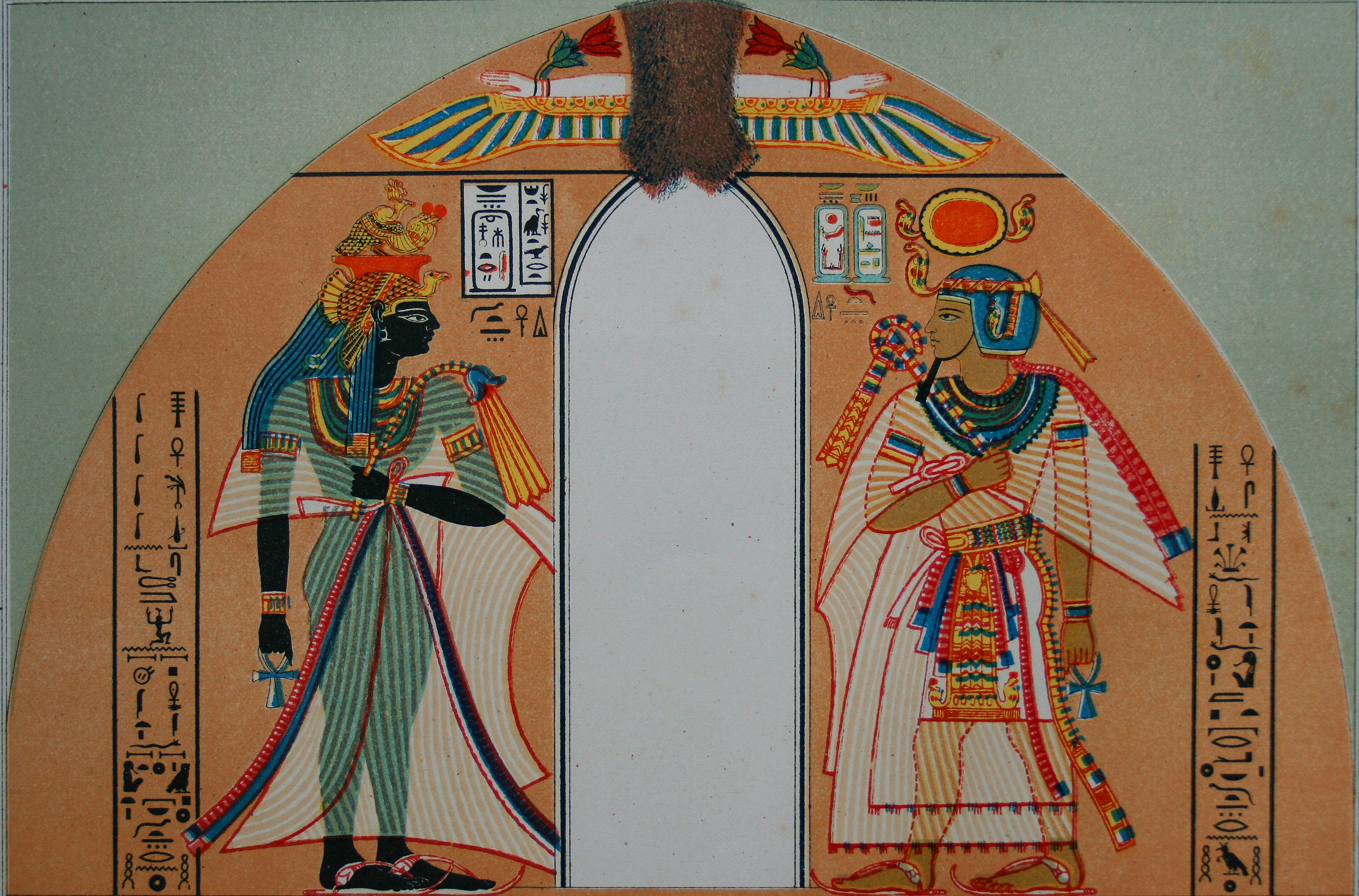
Modern drawing of a doorway from TT359 showing Amenhotep I with his mother, Ahmose-Nefertari

Large numbers of statues of Amenhotep have been found, but they are mostly from the Ramesside period and relate to his continuing funerary cult, made for his posthumous funerary cult. This makes study of the art of his reign difficult. Based upon his few authentic statues, it appears that Amenhotep continued the practice of copying Middle Kingdom styles. Art in the early 18th dynasty was particularly similar to that of the early Middle Kingdom, and the statues produced by Amenhotep I clearly copied those of Mentuhotep II and Senusret I. The two types are so similar that modern Egyptologists have had trouble telling the two apart.

It was probably Amenhotep I who founded the artisans village at Deir el-Medina, whose inhabitants were responsible for much of the art which filled the tombs in the Theban Necropolis for the following generations of New Kingdom rulers and nobles. The earliest name found there is that of Thutmose I; however, Amenhotep was clearly an important figure to the city's workmen since he and his mother were both its patron deities.

Amenhotep's reign saw literary developments. The Book of What is in the Underworld ('the Egyptian Book of the Dead'), an important funerary text used in the New Kingdom, is believed to have reached its final form during Amenhotep's reign, since it first appears in the decoration of the tomb of his successor Thutmose I. The Ebers papyrus, which is the main source for information on ancient Egyptian medicine, also seems to date to this time (the mention of the Heliacal rise of Sothis by which the early New Kingdom chronology is usually calculated was found on the back of this document).

It appears that during Amenhotep I's reign the first water clock was invented. Amenhotep's court astronomer Amenemheb took credit for creating this device in his tomb biography, although the oldest surviving mechanism dates to the reign of Amenhotep III. This invention was of great benefit for timekeeping, because the Egyptian hour was not a fixed amount of time, but was measured as 1/12 of the night. When the nights were shorter in the summer, these waterclocks could be adjusted to measure the shorter hours accurately.

== Building projects ==
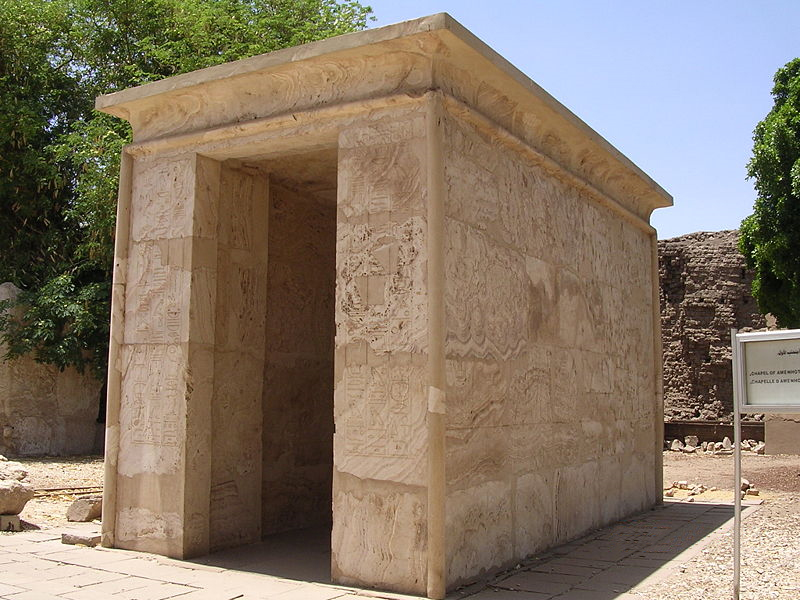
Amenhotep I's reconstructed alabaster chapel at Karnak

Amenhotep began or continued a number of building projects at temple sites in Upper Egypt but most of the structures he built were later dismantled or obliterated by his successors. From written sources it is known that he commissioned the architect Ineni to expand the Temple of Karnak. Ineni's tomb biography indicates that he created a 20-cubit gate of limestone on the south side of Karnak. He constructed a sacred barque chapel of Amun out of alabaster and a copy of the White Chapel of Senusret III. Sculpted material from these structures has been recovered from the fill of Amenhotep III's third pylon allowing some of these structures to be rebuilt at Karnak. Amenhotep also built structures at Karnak for his Sed festival, a festival by which a pharaoh's strength and vigour was renewed after reigning 30 years, but it seems likely that he died before he could use them. A temple was constructed in Nubia at Saï, and he built temple structures in Upper Egypt at Elephantine, Kom Ombo, Abydos, and the Temple of Nekhbet. As far as is known Amenhotep did not build anything of significance in Lower Egypt, like his father.

=== Mortuary complex ===
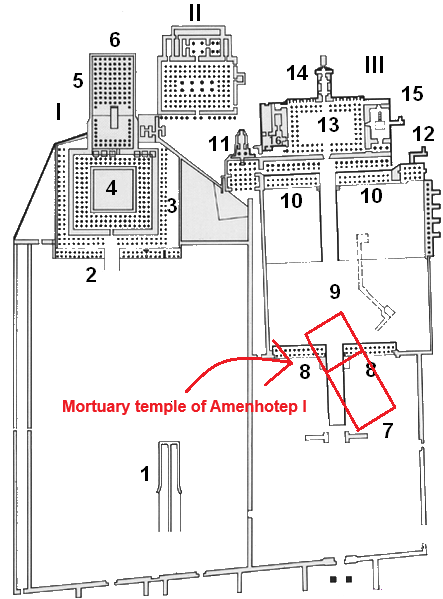
Location of the demolished Mortuary temple of Amenhotep I at Deir el-Bahri

Amenhotep I was the first king of Egypt to separate his mortuary temple from his tomb, probably in an attempt to keep his tomb safe from robbers. This temple was sited at the north end of Deir el-Bahri. Deir el-Bahri appears to have had some sort of funerary significance for Amenhotep, since Theban Tomb 358, the tomb of his queen Ahmose-Meritamon, was also found nearby. Amenhotep's mortuary temple was largely demolished to make way for the lower terrace of the mortuary temple constructed approximately 50 years later by Queen Hatshepsut, and only a few bricks inscribed with Amenhotep's name remain, the rest having been reused. The royal statues inside of the temple were moved to the nearby mortuary temple of Mentuhotep II.

== Tomb and burial ==
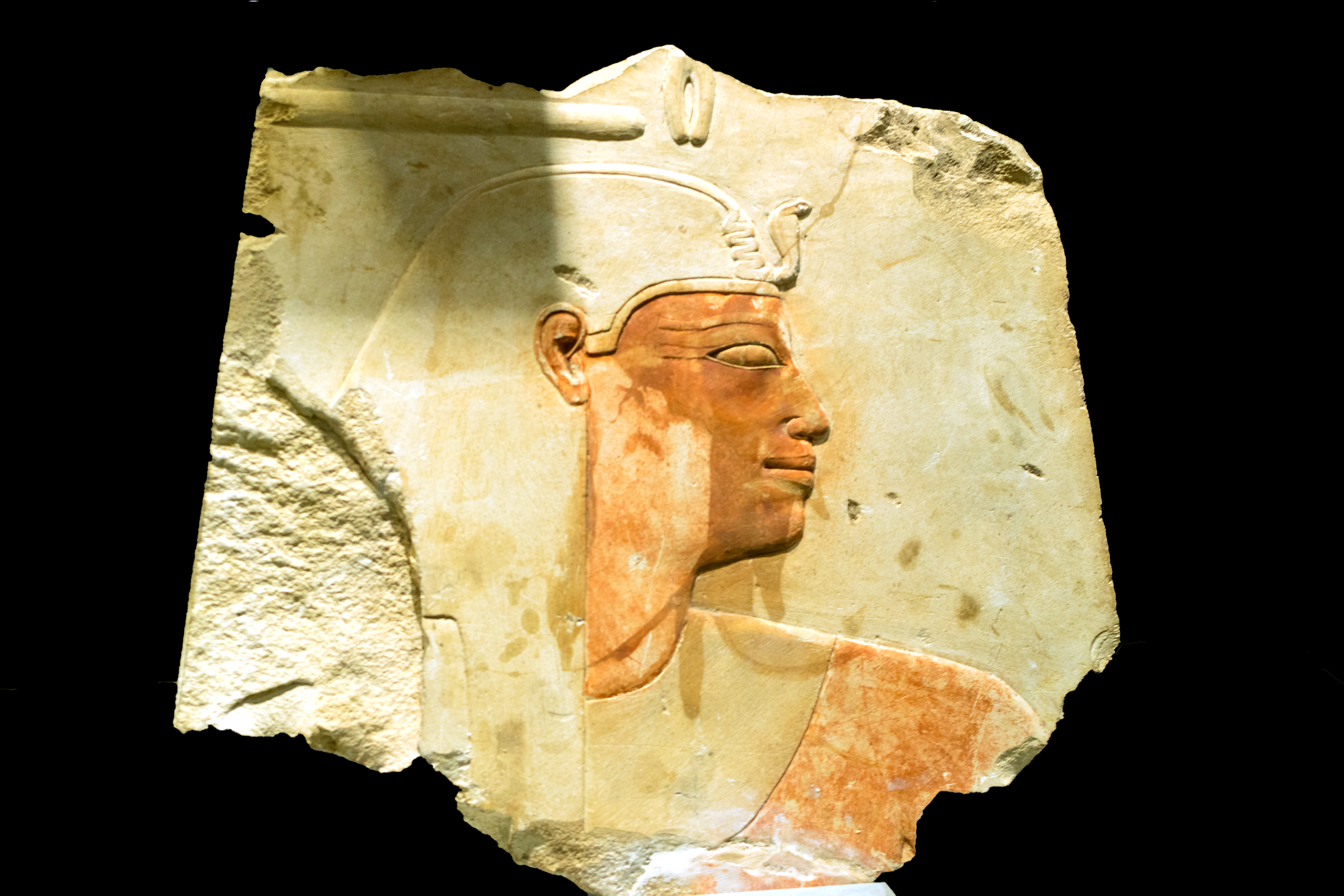
Fragmentary relief of Amenhotep I

The original location of Amenhotep's tomb has not been securely identified. A report on the security of royal tombs in the Theban Necropolis commissioned during the troubled reign of Ramesses IX noted that it was then intact, but its location was not specified. Two sites for Amenhotep I's tomb have been proposed, one high up in the Valley of the Kings, KV39 and the other at Dra' Abu el-Naga', Tomb ANB. Excavations at KV 39 suggest it was used or reused to store the Deir el-Bahri Cache, which included the king's well-preserved mummy, before its final reburial. However, Tomb ANB is considered the more likely possibility, because it contains objects bearing his name and the names of some family members.

=== Mummy ===
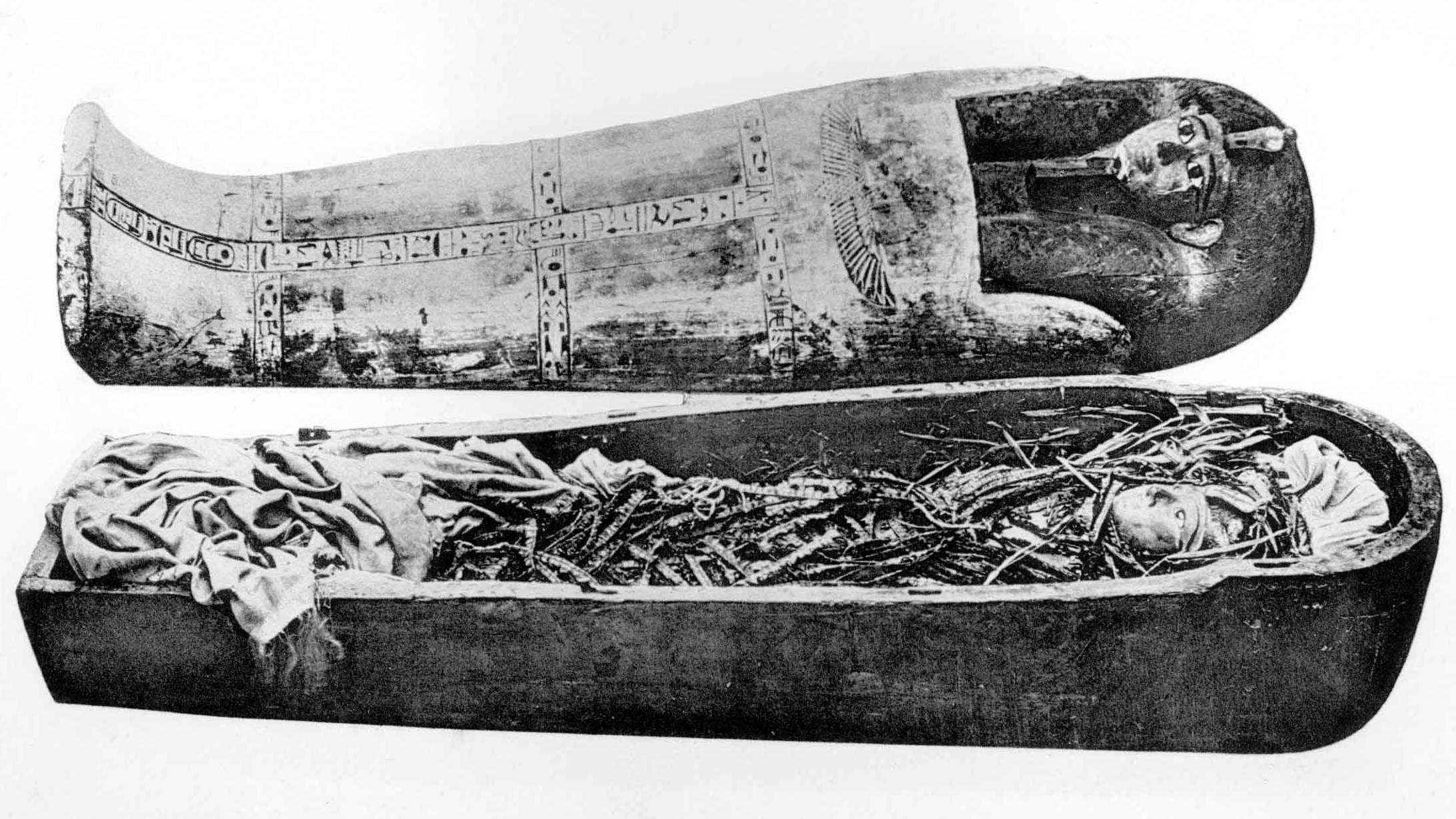
The coffin and mummy of Amenhotep I

Sometime during the 20th or 21st Dynasty, Amenhotep's original tomb was either robbed or deemed insecure and emptied and his body was moved for safety, probably more than once. It was found in the Deir el-Bahri Cache, hidden with the mummies of numerous New Kingdom kings and nobles in or after the late 22nd dynasty above the Mortuary Temple of Hatshepsut and was kept in the Egyptian Museum in Cairo. His Rishi coffin was in decent condition and his mummy had apparently not been looted by the 21st dynasty, and the priests who moved the mummy took care to keep the cartonnage facial death mask intact. Amenhotep's is the only royal mummy which has not been unwrapped and examined by modern Egyptologists. His body was x-rayed in 1932; his age at death was estimated at 40–50 years, which seemed inaccurate. He was x-rayed again in 1967, resulting in a much lower age estimate of 25 years at death based on the good condition of his teeth.

In April 2021 his mummy was moved to National Museum of Egyptian Civilization along with those of 17 other kings and 4 queens in an event termed the Pharaohs' Golden Parade.

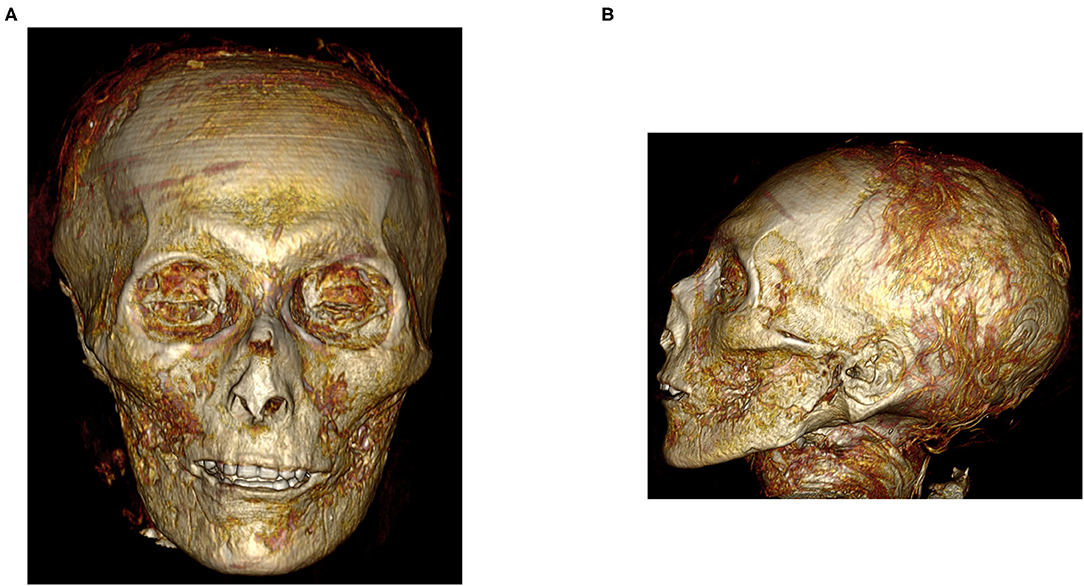
Three-dimensional CT image of the face and left profile of Amenhotep I

=== CT scan ===
The X-ray examinations of the mummy of King Amenhotep I failed to provide consistent data or detailed information on the mummy. In the plain x-ray examination, the three-dimensional (3D) information of the mummy is projected onto a two-dimensional X-ray film. The result is the superimposition of objects and bones which makes mummy characterization less satisfactory. In contrast, CT is an advanced form of X-ray that obtains hundreds of thin sections (slices) of the body and provides more detailed reconstructed images of soft tissues as well as bones. On 4 May 2019, his mummy was investigated using non-invasive CT scanning to gain insights into his physical appearance, health, cause of death, and mummification style. Two-dimensional and three-dimensional images of the mask, bandages, and mummy were generated using this technique. This study estimates his age at death as 35 years, based on the fusion of his epiphyses and condition of the pubic symphysis. Thus, Amenhotep I must have came to the throne at 15 years old.

His organs were removed through a vertical embalming incision and the body cavity stuffed with linen; the heart is present in the chest cavity. No attempt was made to remove the brain. No packing was inserted into the orbits and no subcutaneous padding is seen anywhere on the body. Each nostril was plugged with rolls of resin-treated linen. Amulets and items of jewelry are present inside the wrappings; a beaded girdle, likely of gold, is present at across the back of his hips. The body had suffered post-mortem damage at the hands of robbers, with his head, left arm, right hand, and right foot being detached; there is also a large hole in the front of his torso. Efforts were made to restore the body during his rewrapping and caching. His head and limbs were reattached, and his foot was supported by a board.

== Succession and legacy ==
Amenhotep I is thought to have had only one child, a son who died in infancy, although some sources indicate he had no children. Amenhotep I was succeeded by Thutmose I, apparently a senior military figure. It is unclear if there was any blood relationship between the two, although it has been suggested that Thutmose I was the son of Amenhotep I. Amenhotep may have appointed Thutmose I as coregent before his own death as Thutmose I's name appears next to Amenhotep's on a divine barque found by archeologists in the fill of the third pylon at Karnak. However, most scholars consider that this is only evidence of Thutmose associating himself with his royal predecessor. One text has also been interpreted to mean that Amenhotep appointed his infant son as coregent, who then predeceased him. However, the scholarly consensus is that there is too little evidence for either coregency.

=== Funerary cult ===
Amenhotep was deified upon his death and made the patron deity of the village which he opened at Deir el-Medina. His mother, who lived at least one year longer than he did, was also deified upon her death and became part of his litany. As previously mentioned, the vast majority of Amenhotep's statuary comes in the form of a funerary idol from this cult during later periods. When being worshiped, he had three deific manifestations: "Amenhotep of the Town", "Amenhotep Beloved of Amun", and "Amenhotep of the Forecourt", and was known as a god who produced oracles. Some of the questions asked of him have been preserved on ostraca from Deir el-Medina, and appear to have been phrased in such a way that the idol of the king could nod (or be caused to nod) the answer. He also had a number of feasts dedicated to him which were held throughout the year. During the first month, a festival was celebrated in honor of the appearance of Amenhotep to the necropolis workmen, which probably means his idol was taken to Deir el-Medina. Another feast was held on the thirtieth of the fourth month, and then two more were held in the seventh month. The first was the "spreading of the funeral couch for king Amenhotep", which probably commemorated the day of his death. The second, celebrated for four days at the very end of the month, was the "great festival of king Amenhotep lord of the town". Later in Egyptian history, the seventh month, "Phamenoth", was named after this festival. Another festival was held on the 27th of the ninth month, and the last known festival was held for several days between at least the eleventh and thirteenth days of the eleventh month, which in all probability commemorated the date of Amenhotep's accession to the throne.

Further light is shed upon Amenhotep's funerary cult by multiple documents which appear to detail the rituals dedicated to Amenhotep. Three papyri from the time of Ramesses II record the liturgy used by the priests, and reliefs at Karnak and Medinet Habu illustrate select rites and spells. The bulk of the rituals concern preparing for and conducting the daily offerings of libations for the idol, including a recitation of a ḥtp-dỉ-nsw formula, and purifying and sealing the shrine at the end of the day. The remainder of the rites concern how to conduct various feasts throughout the year. In these cases, Amenhotep's idol or a priest representing him is actually officiating the worship of Amun instead of being worshipped himself, which was not a typical cultic practice in ancient Egypt.

== Gallery ==
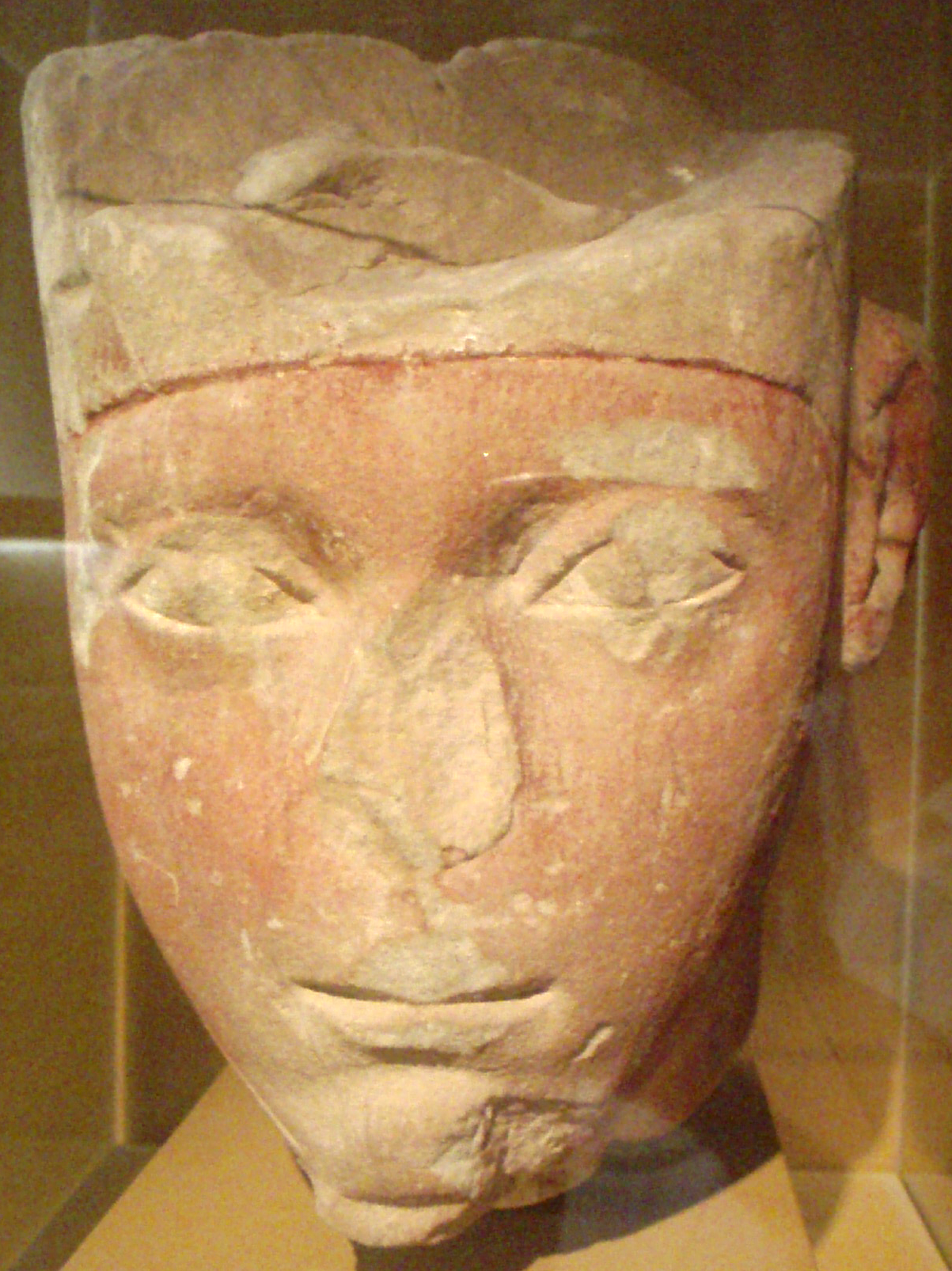
Head from a statue of Amenhotep I, Museum of Fine Arts, Boston, Boston

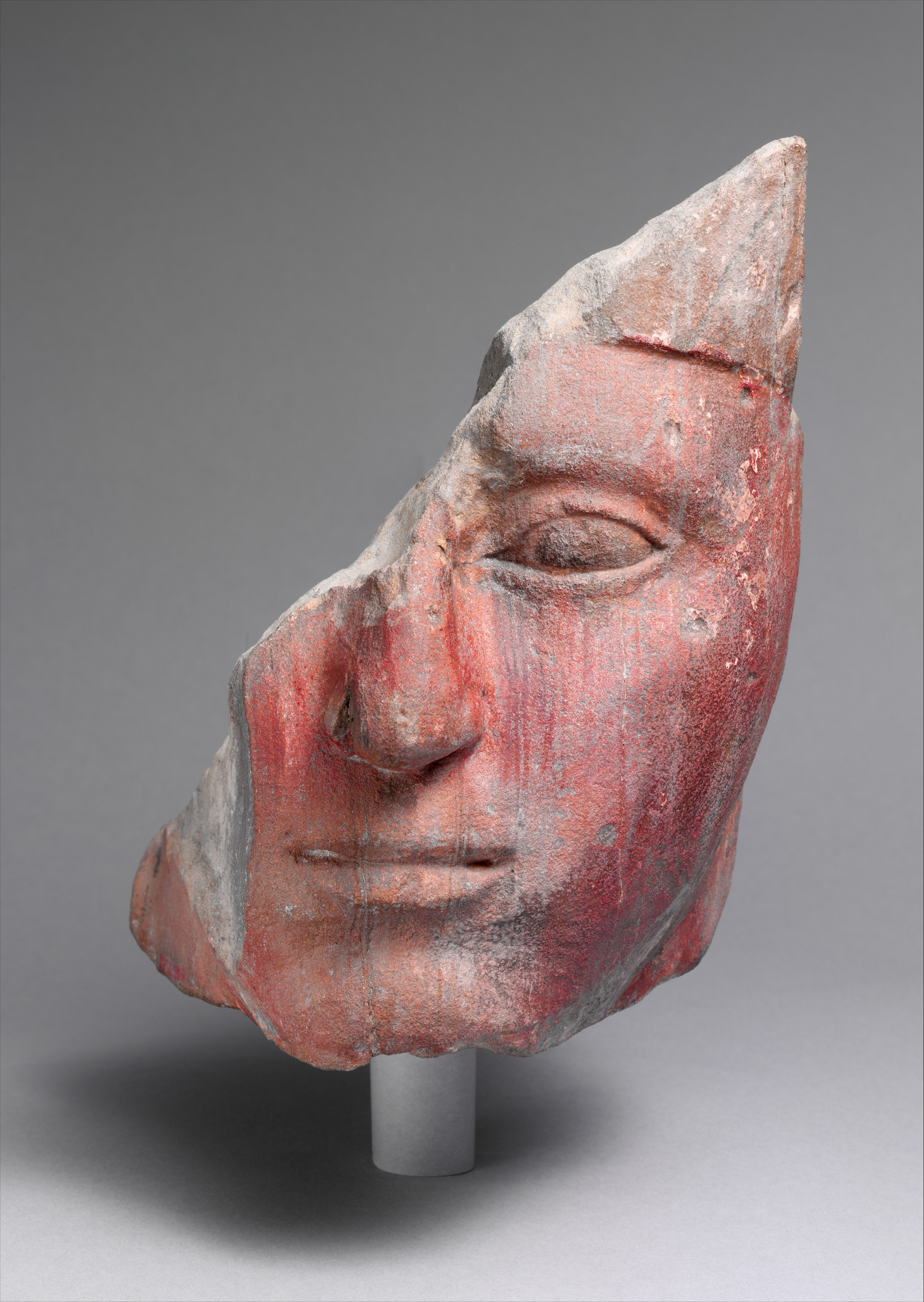
Head from a statue of Amenhotep I, now at the Metropolitan Museum of Art, New York

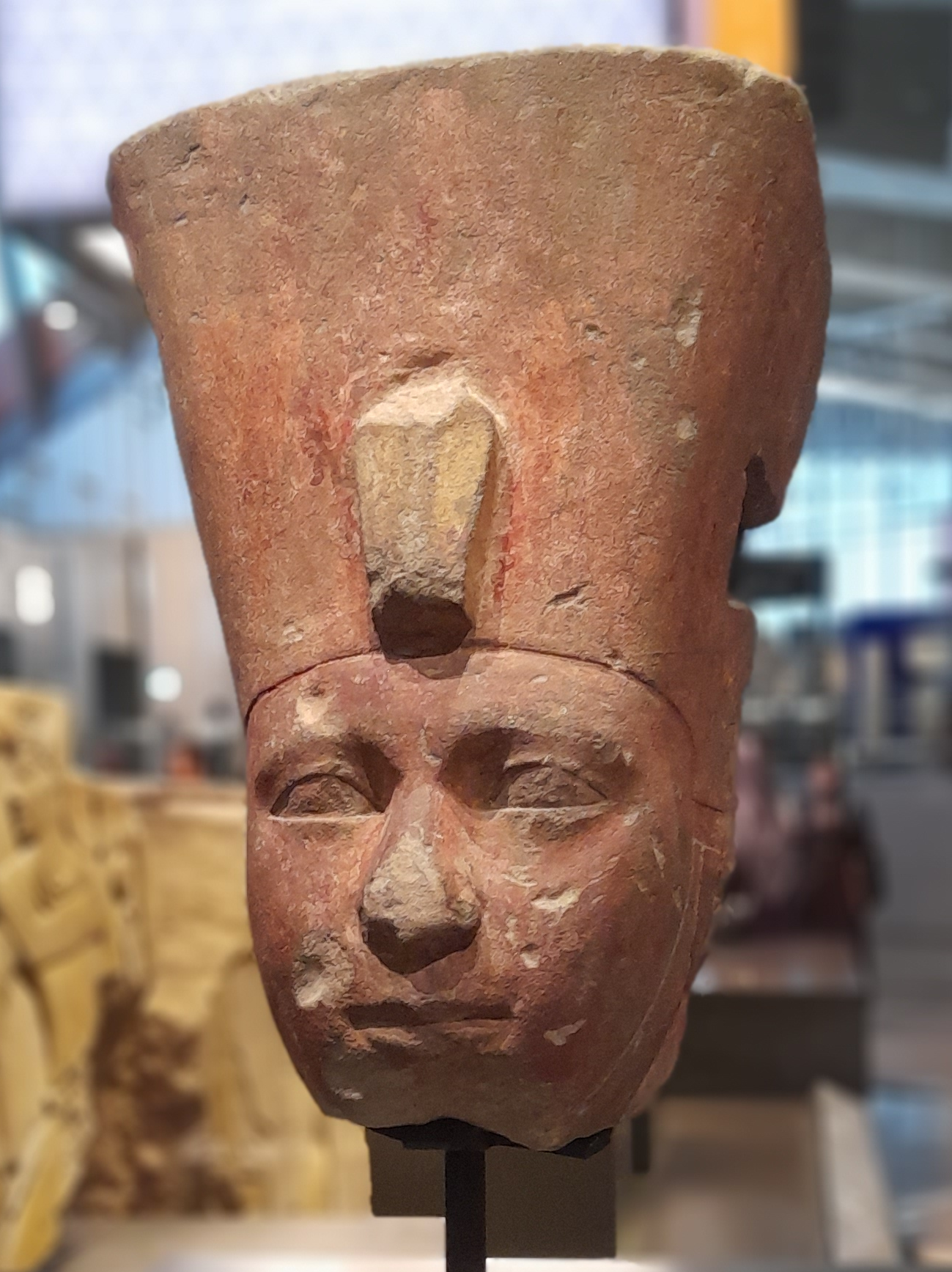
Head from a statue of Amenhotep I, now at the Grand Egyptian Museum, Giza

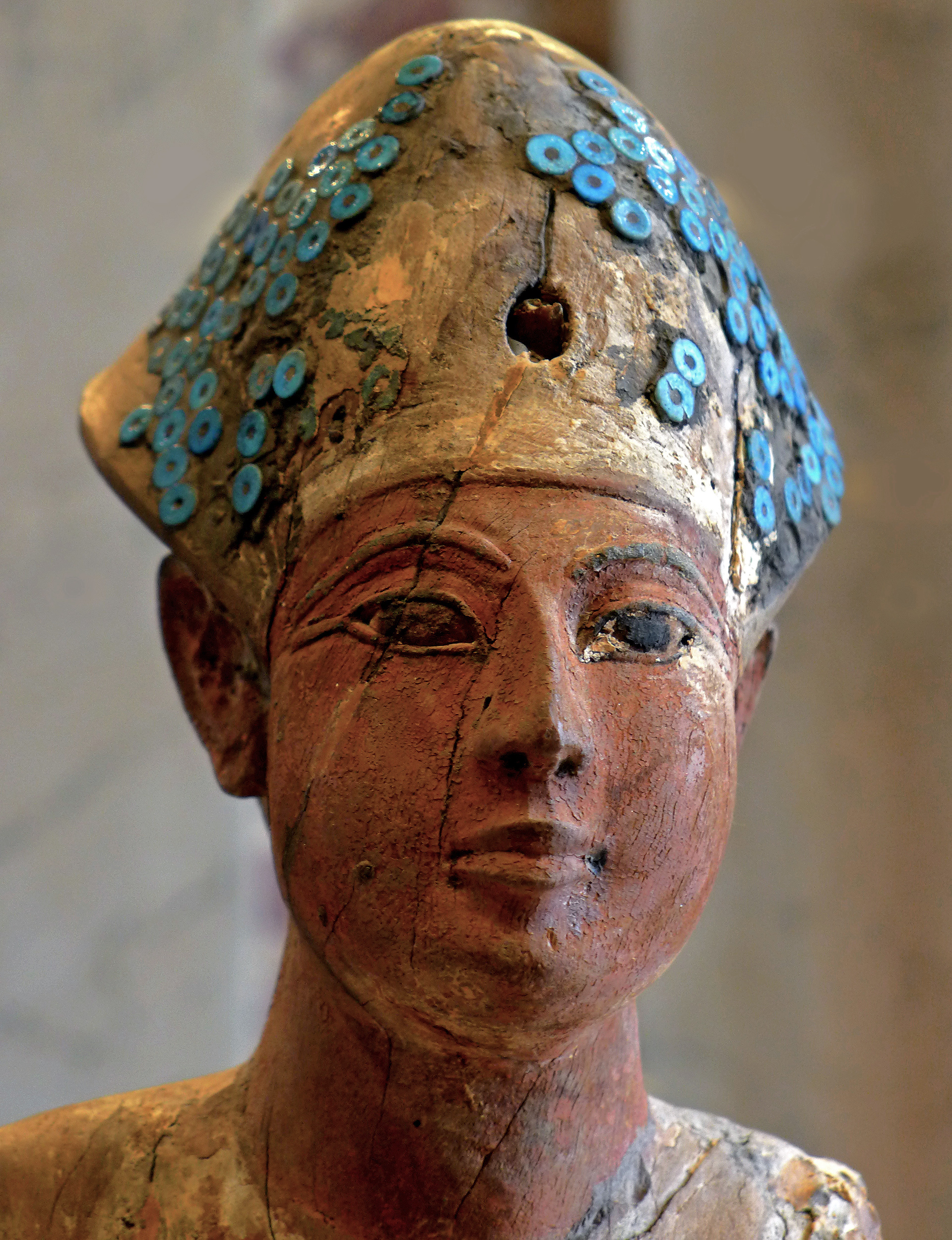
Wooden statue of Amenhotep I that was usurped by Ramses II wearing the Khepresh, now at the Louvre E 16277, Paris

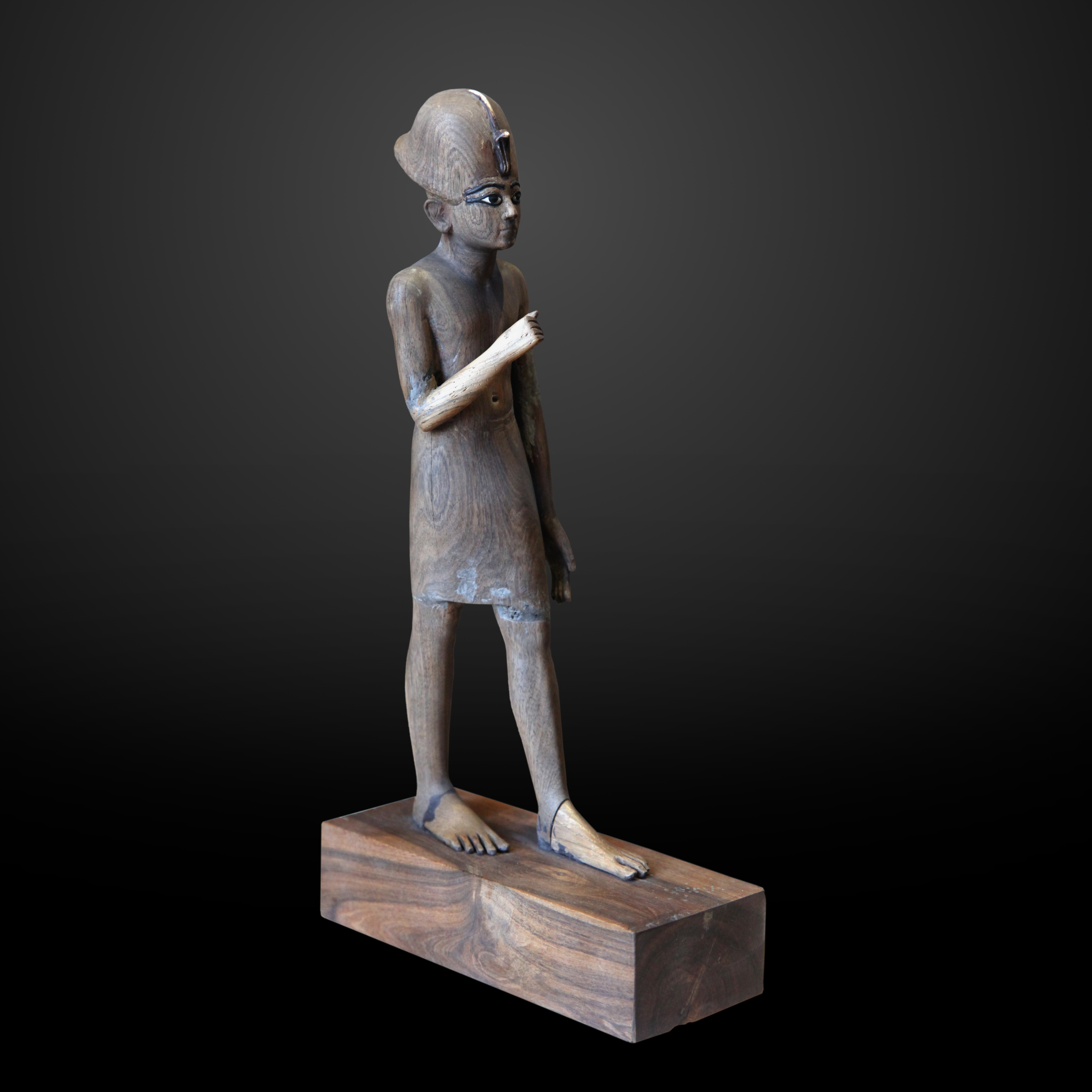
Wood statuette of a king, possibly Amenhotep I, now in the Louvre, Paris

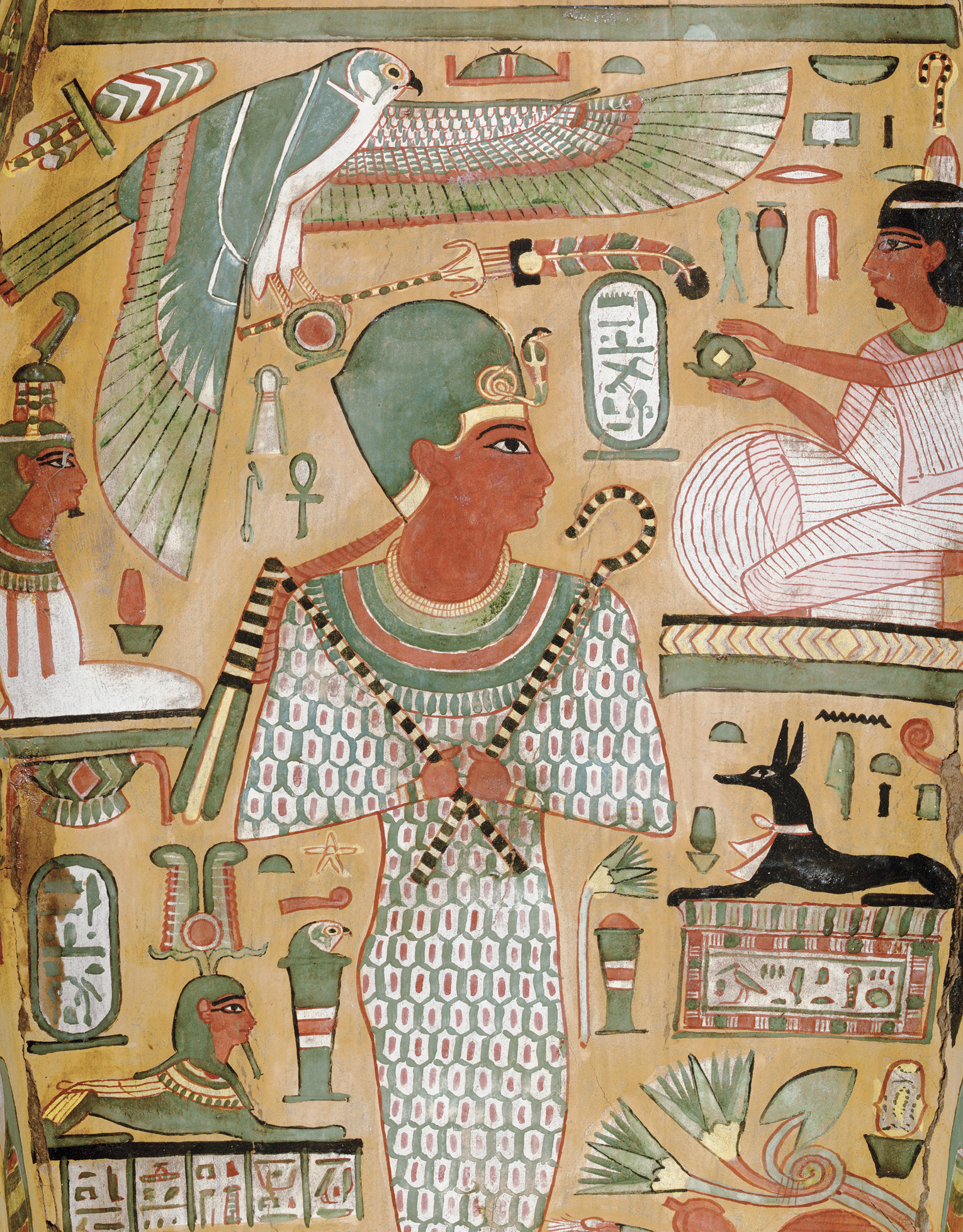
Representation of Amenhotep I as a mummy from the sarcophagus of Neskhons, now located at the Cleveland Museum of Art, Cleveland

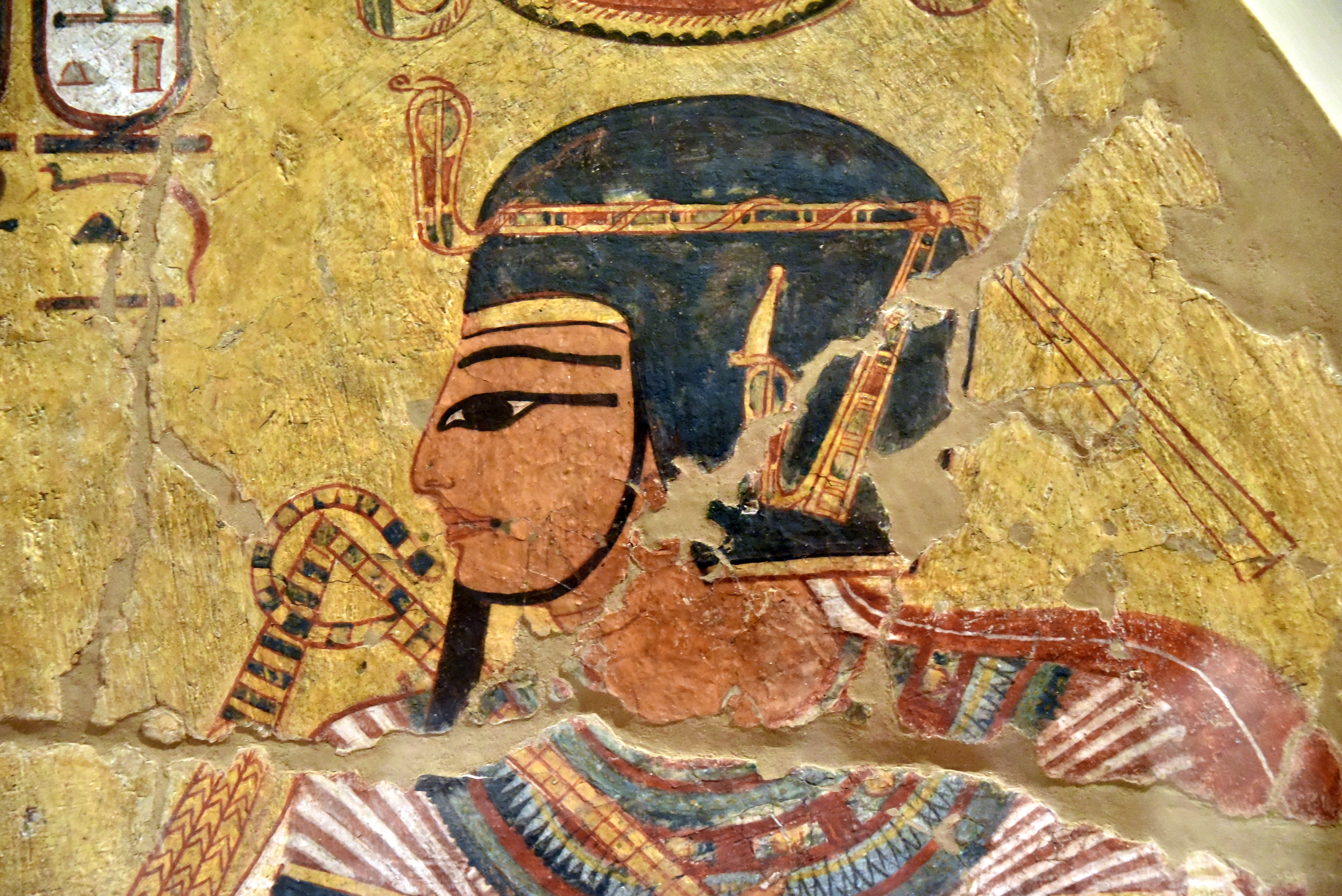
Representation of Amenhotep I from Tomb TT359 at Deir el-Medina, Egypt. Neues Museum, Berlin

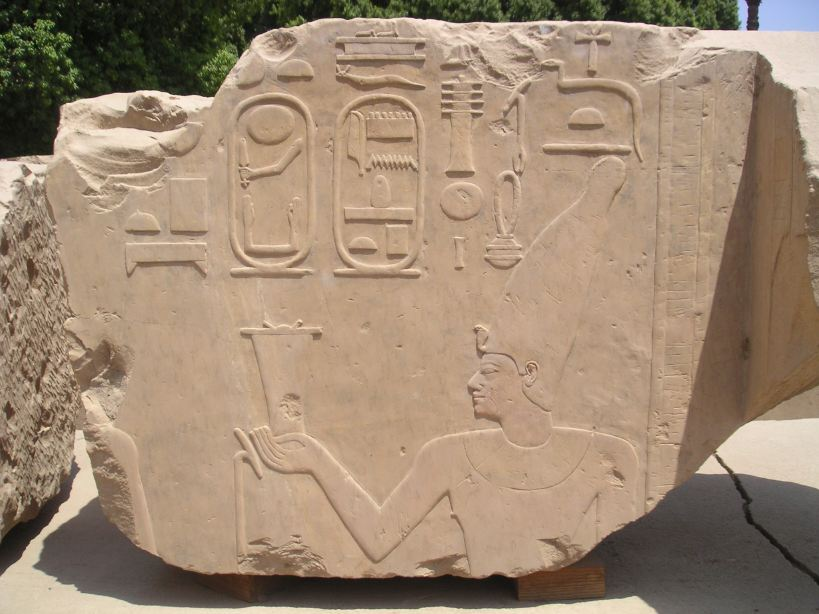
Relief représentant le pharaon Aménophis I (Amenhotep I) provenant du temple d'Amon - Musée en plein air de Karnak

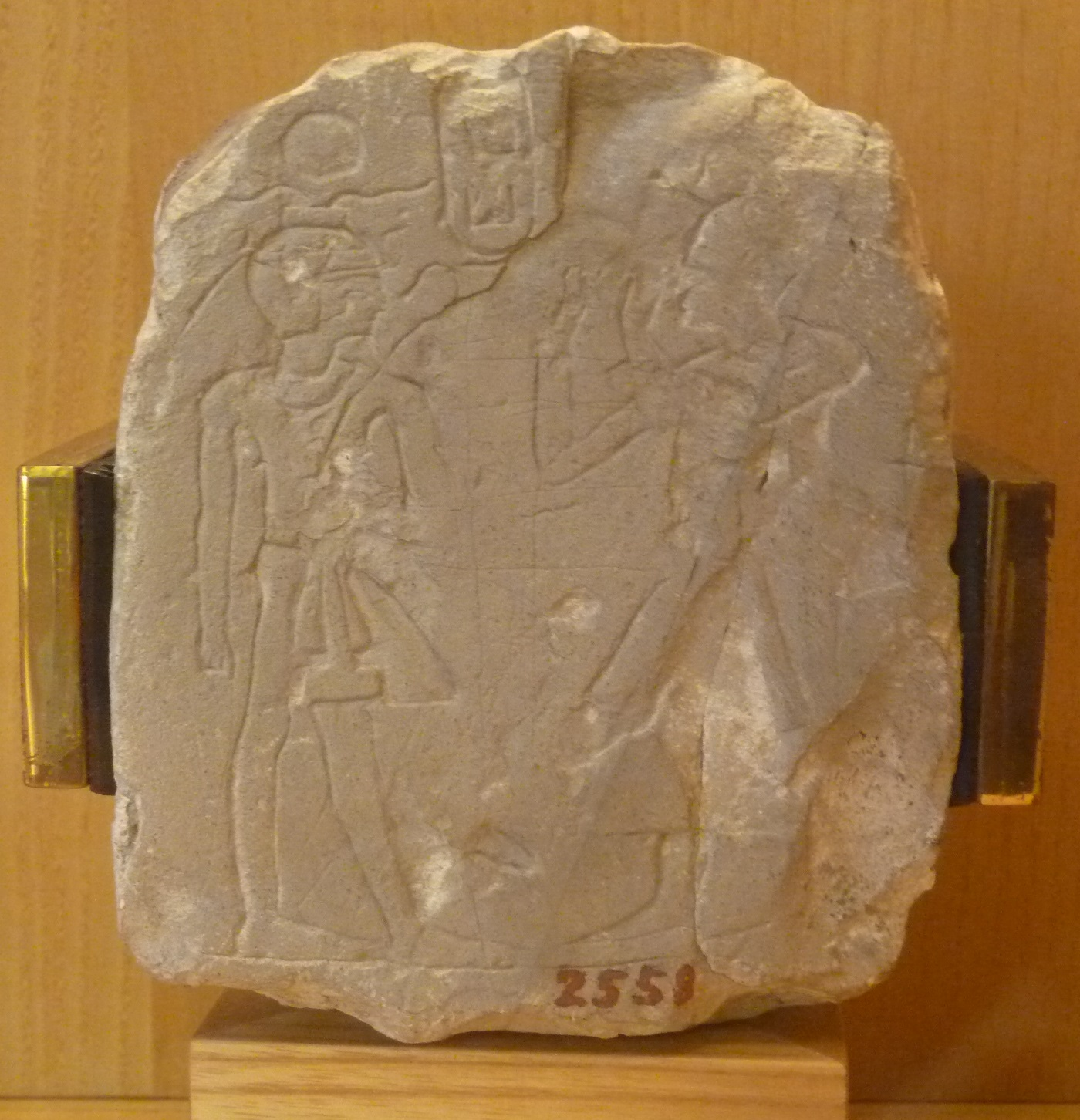
Broken votive stele depicting a man (right) adoring Djeserkare (Amenhotep I, left). 19–20th dynasty, New Kingdom. Limestone, probably found in Deir le-Medina by the Rosellini expedition (1828–29).

== See also ==
- List of pharaohs
