= Papyrus Leopold II =

Ancient Egyptian document

The ancient Egyptian document Papyrus Leopold II (originally Amherst Papyrus VI) is part of the original court records dealing with the tomb robberies under Ramesses IX and dates to Year 16 of Ramesses IX. It contains the confessions of eight men who had broken into the tomb of Sobekemsaf II and a description of the reconstruction of the crime. It throws light on the practices followed at ancient Egyptian courts: eliciting confessions by beating with a double rod, smiting their feet and hands, reconstructing the crime on site, and imprisonment of suspects in the gatehouse of a temple. The document remains an important document for understanding the importance of burial and the afterlife in ancient Egypt as well as crime and punishment practices in Egypt during the 20th Dynasty.

== Background history ==
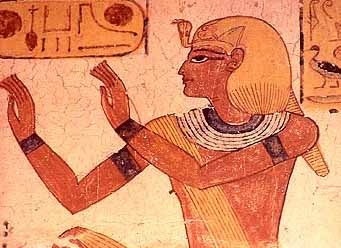
Ramesses IX.

The grave robbery described in the Amherst-Leopold document came during the 20th Dynasty of ancient Egypt and "a background of economic trouble and incipient national disunity." This was a difficult time for Egypt and one that certainly was not prosperous. Egypt was no longer able to control its foreign territories and lost them, whilst foreign powers, such as Libya, would trouble Egypt with raids into Egyptian territories. During this period regional leaders, foreign dignitaries and administrative representatives found themselves with more power as Pharaohs attempted to control civil order. Civil order and administrative power was at a low, whilst economic conditions in Egypt had faltered due to inflation: "in the late Twentieth Dynasty, a period for which we have a wealth of documentary evidence about tomb-robbing, the practice was clearly encouraged by economic factors." As such tomb-robbing became a lucrative and more appealing way to get riches during a weak period of ancient Egypt. "Intact burials are frequently very poor ones, the ancient plunderers having known well that they were not worth the trouble of investigation."

Tomb-robbing was a common feature in the Ancient World, and was very common in Egypt in particular: "it is a sad fact that the vast majority of ancient Egyptian tombs have been plundered in antiquity." Efforts had been made in the past to discourage tomb-robbers, but it only served to increase their ingenuity and craft. At first the coffins themselves were made harder to open, and went from being made out of wood to stone, whilst entrances were sealed in a way to make it difficult for robbers to enter, secret burial chambers were then used to hide the bodies. Despite all the measures to stop these robbers, the lure of potential treasures during the hard times can be seen to have led to robberies like those described in the Amherst-Leopold Papyrus.

== Content ==
The symbol for impalement.

The actual content of the papyrus is concerned with the confessions of the perpetrators on the crime committed as well as the punishment handed out to them. The tomb that was robbed belonged to Sobekemsaf II and the crimes dated to Year 13 of Ramesses IX. Amenpnufer is shown as the main player in the robbery, and in his trial we are told that the amount of gold found in the pyramid came to 32 lbs. The robbery was not just limited to Sobekemsaf; "we also found the royal wife and collected all that we found on her. We took objects of gold, silver, bronze, and divided them amongst us." Whilst the perpetrators admitted to committing the crimes, we know that crime and punishment during the time was not so fair or comfortable: "the robbers brought before investigators of the Twentieth Dynasty were questioned about their activities and witnesses were called to confirm or contradict their stories. Both the accused and the witnesses were beaten as an aid to their memories." Knowing this, it becomes harder to really judge whether those accused really were responsible for committing the crimes, although the description of the event would point towards the guilt of the accused: "We stripped off the gold, which we found on the august mummy of this god, and its amulets and ornaments which were at its throat, and the coverings wherein it rested." The punishment we are given as listed is that of impalement, a punishment used for the most serious of crimes: "the punishment for violating a royal tomb: impalement."

== Modern history of the papyrus ==
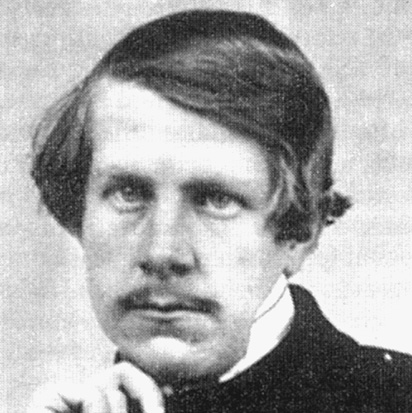
Lord Amherst of Hackney.

The Amherst-Leopold Papyrus is split in two halves: the lower half of the papyrus was bought in Egypt by Lord Amherst of Hackney in the middle of the 19th century, and sold to John Pierpont Morgan in 1913. In 1935 the missing upper part was found by the Belgian Egyptologist Jean Capart in the Musées Royaux d'Art et d'Histoire at Brussels, and given the name Leopold II papyrus. This fragment had been hidden inside a wooden statuette which had been acquired by the future Belgian king Leopold II during one of his visits to Egypt in 1854 or 1862. As such efforts in coordinating the documentation and understanding of the Amherst-Leopold Papyrus have been difficult, unlike similar documents such as the Abbot Papyrus.

== Historical importance ==
The Amherst-Leopold Papyrus is of great importance in helping understand the culture of ancient Egypt "and give[s] us more detail than we could ever have recovered from purely archaeological evidence." The document shows us the prevalence of tomb-robbing in ancient Egypt and the rewards it offered, and demonstrates why people would perform the difficult and dangerous act of robbing a tomb. The punishments given for the crime itself also can be seen to be important, the harshness of impalement shows that tomb-robbing was taken very seriously. This suggests that the authorities either wanted to prevent future robberies by giving such harsh punishments and deter future tomb-robbers (even though it had not deterred those in the past), or it might show the importance of death and the afterlife in ancient Egypt. The acts in robbing tombs, such as taking away funerary gifts and destroying coffins or even the bodies of the deceased, was thought to endanger their passage into the afterlife, and could be the reason for using such a violent and painful punishment. What we do know for sure is that this source is an interesting view into Egyptian culture and administration, giving us an idea of what life and the practices of ancient Egyptians were like.

== See also ==
- List of ancient Egyptian papyri
- Abbott Papyrus
- Mayer Papyri
- Ambras Papyrus
