= Mayer Papyri =

Ancient Egyptian documents

The Mayer Papyri are two ancient Egyptian documents from the Twentieth Dynasty that contain records of court proceedings, now held at the World Museum in Liverpool, England.

== Papyrus Mayer A ==
The best known of the two is Papyrus Mayer A. It deals with court sessions held in the first two years of the Whm Mswt or Renaissance, an era which began in year 19 of king Ramesses XI.

A panel consisting of the vizier of the South and three high officials cross-examined suspects charged with tomb robbery at Deir el-Bahri (cf. also the Abbott Papyrus and the Amherst Papyrus). The interrogation of both suspects and witnesses was preceded by a bastinado and an oath in the name of the king was administered.

The confessions of the six suspects were corroborated by the testimony of the chief of police of the Theban Necropolis and other witnesses, among them the son of one of the thieves who had died in the meantime. This witness claims to have been a child at the time of the crime; still, he was beaten when he was being examined, as was a female witness.

While the ancient Egyptian judicial system was quite brutal and biased against the accused, a verdict of guilty was not a foregone conclusion: Papyrus Mayer A records the discharge of five men who had been found to be innocent.

The World Museum has dated A circa 1083 - 1080 BCE.

== Papyrus Mayer B ==
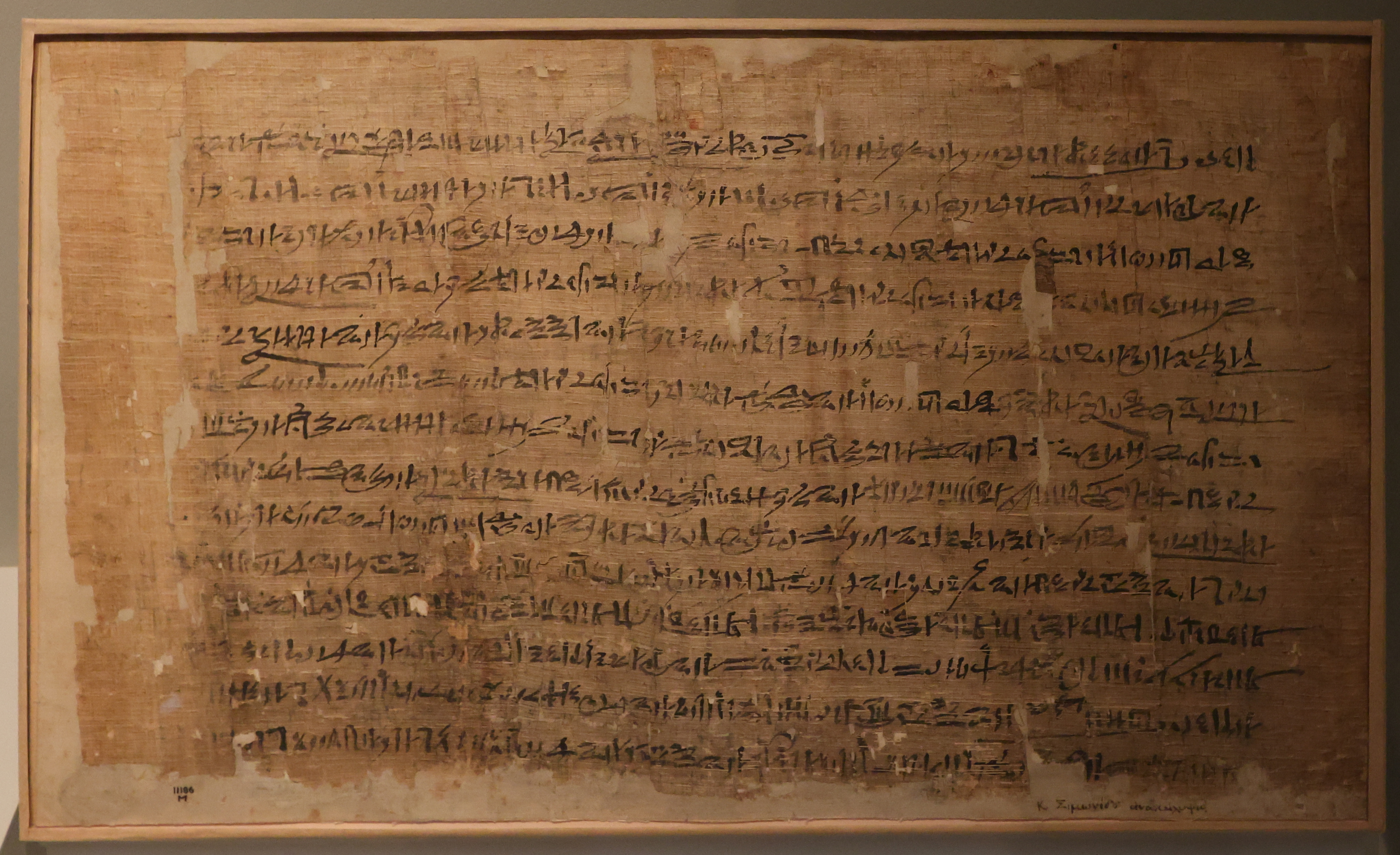
Papyrus Mayer B at the World Museum, Liverpool

Papyrus Mayer B is a papyrus fragment, only inscribed on the recto. It consists of 14 preserved horizontal lines of hieratic script, in a form typical of the Twentieth Dynasty. Both its beginning and end are incomplete. It deals with the robbery of the tomb of king Ramesses VI, which is not alluded to in any of the other tomb-robbery papyri. No names of officials have survived in the extant part of the papyrus. Of the five thieves named, none can be identified with certainty. The coppersmith Pentahetnakht may or may not have been identical to the coppersmith Pentahetnakht, son of Kedakhtef, mentioned in Pap. BM 10054 as a member of a gang which was tried in year 16 of Ramesses IX.

Cyril Aldred has pointed out that the coffer of the sarcophagus of Ramesses VI must have been removed relatively soon after the burial, because the sacramental oils had not yet had the time to solidify, but whether this was done during the pilfering by the thieves tried in Pap. Mayer B remains uncertain.

The World Museum has dated B to circa 1118 BCE.

== See also ==
- List of ancient Egyptian papyri
