= Djedptahiufankh =

Ancient Egyptian priest

Djedptahiuefankh
- Second Prophet of Amun; Third Prophet of Amun
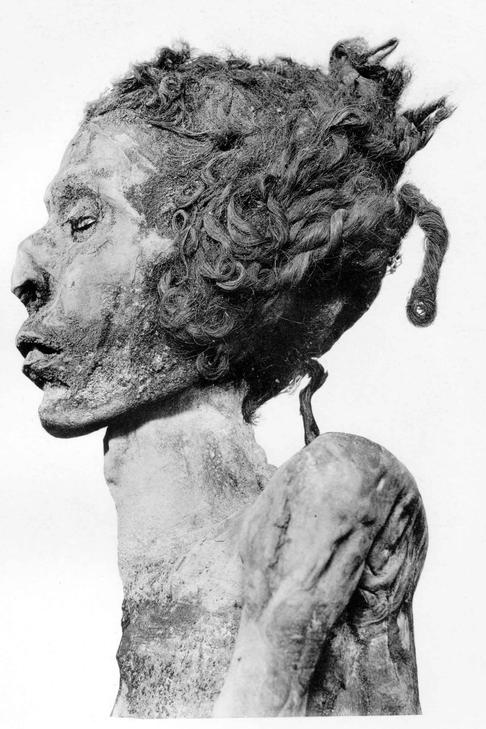
- Mummy of Djedptahiufankh, from DB320
- Dynasty: 22nd Dynasty
- Pharaoh: Shoshenq I
- Wife: Nesitanebetashru (A)?
- Burial: Royal Cache (TT320)

Djedptahiufankh (c. 969 – c. 935 BCE) served as Second Prophet of Amun and Third Prophet of Amun during the reign of Shoshenq I of the 22nd Dynasty.

== Family and career ==
Djedptahiufankh is only known from his burial and mummy. He held the title of District Governor as well as "King's Son of Ramesses" and "King's Son of the Lord of the Two Lands". The latter may suggest that he was related to the royal family of possibly the 21st Dynasty or 22nd Dynasty. It has been conjectured that Djedptahiufankh was the husband of Nesitanebetashru (A) (who was a daughter of Pinedjem II and Neskhons). This theory is based purely on the fact that Djedptahiufankh was buried next to Nesitanebetashru in DB320.

== Death and burial ==
He died around the middle of Shoshenq I's reign according to inscriptions found written on the bandages of his mummy and coffin. He was buried in Deir El-Bahari Tomb 320 or DB320, which actually served as the family tomb of the 21st Dynasty High Priest of Amun Pinedjem I. DB320 was discovered in the 19th century and quickly became famous for containing a cache of many of the most significant New Kingdom royal mummies including the mortal remains of Amenhotep I, the Great Ramesses II, Ramesses III, Ramesses IX, and Thutmose I, Thutmose II and Thutmose III.

Three separate mummy bandages dating to Years 5, 10 and 11 of Shoshenq I were found on Djedptahiufankh's body. Djedptahiufankh's burial was found intact and undisturbed, and his mummy was unwrapped by Gaston Maspero in 1886. Amulets were found within the wrappings on the body, with ones in the form of snakes and lotus at the throat and a heart scarab on the chest. Grafton Elliott Smith removed the remainder of the wrappings in 1906 and discovered a group of various stone amulets on the left arm including those in the shape a heart, eyes, a uraeus, and djed-pillars. A bronze embalming plate was placed over the incision used to remove the organs. Bundles containing the mummified organs were placed inside the body cavity; a small amulet depicting the baboon-headed god Hapi was included with the intestines. Thin gold rings were found on most of the fingers, which Smith suggested were used to hold gold finger stalls in place.
