= Medjed (disambiguation) =

Medjed, also spelled as Medjedu, is a minor Ancient Egyptian deity.

Medjed may also refer to:

- Medjed (fish), a species of elephantfish worshipped in Ancient Egypt
- Medjed (mountain), a peak in the Dinaric Alps near Bobotov Kuk
- Khufu, a pharaoh of the Fourth Dynasty of Egypt and the builder of the Great Pyramid of Giza, whose Horus name was Medjedu
