= Greenfield Papyrus =

Papyrus containing an ancient Egyptian Book of the Dead

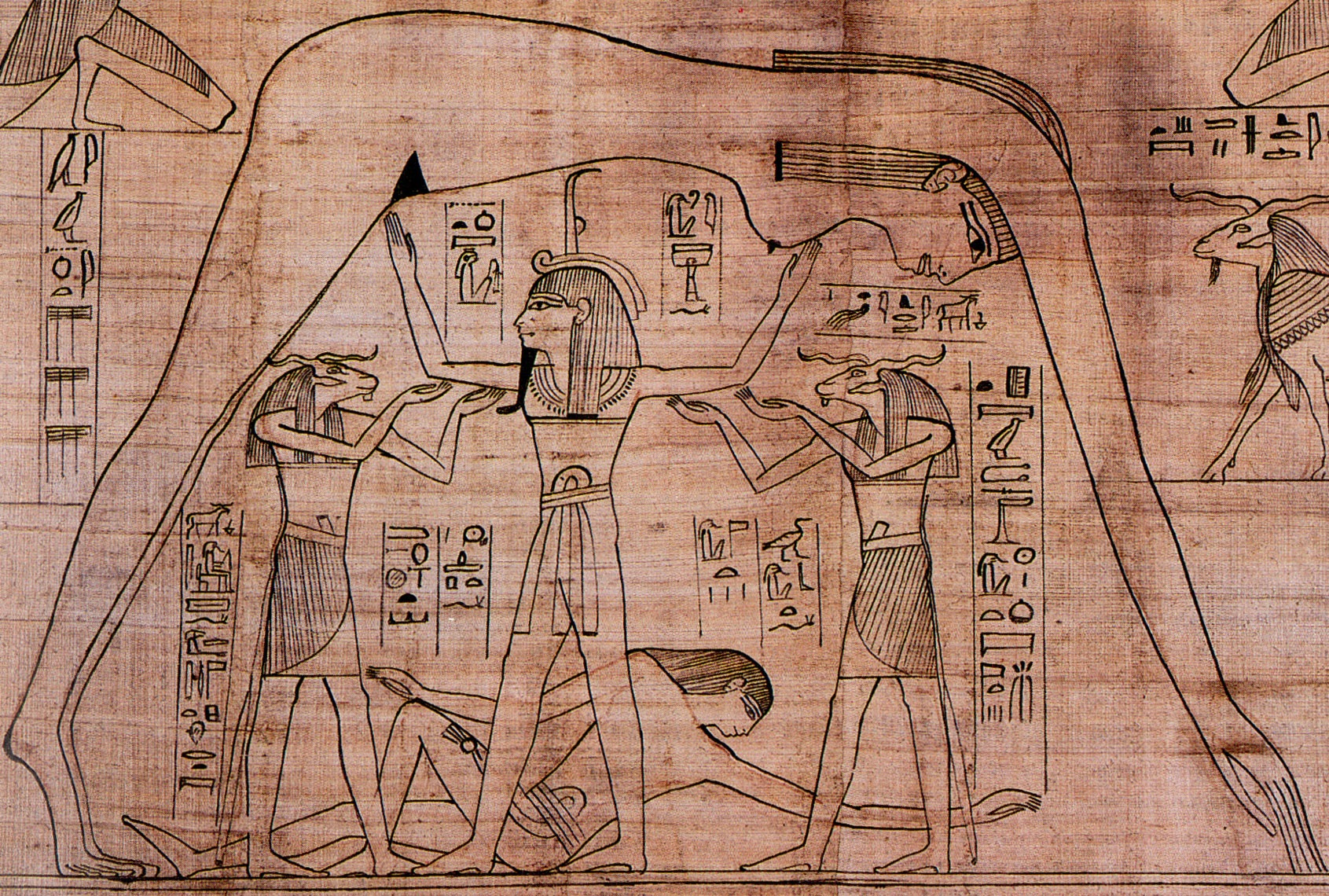
Detail showing the sky goddess Nut

The Greenfield Papyrus is a papyrus that contains an ancient Egyptian Book of the Dead and is named after Mrs. Edith Mary Greenfield, who presented it to the Trustees of the British Museum in May 1910. Now in the collections of the British Museum, London, it is one of the longest papyri in existence with a length of 37 metres (121 ft).

== Manuscript ==
The Greenfield Papyrus is a papyrus roll with an original length of about 37 metres (121 ft) and about 47 cm (19 in) wide. Nowadays, the manuscript is divided into 96 pieces. The manuscript contains both text and drawings, the text is written on the recto side and in hieratic script and partly in hieroglyphs. The Book of the Dead includes a series of hymns, litanies, tributes and homages. The papyrus is dated to between the 950s and 930s BC during Egypt's Twenty-first Dynasty. The manuscript describes the burial of the priest Pinudjem II and his wife Neskhons's daughter Nesitanebetashru around the year 930 BC. One of the scenes shows when the god Shu (God of Air) helps Nut (Goddess of the Sky) to divide heaven and earth, represented as Geb (God of the Earth). Among the scenes are also parts of the creation of the world according to the Egyptian creation myth with the god Atum in the centre.

== Provenance ==
It is not known when and how the papyrus was discovered but the English collector Herbert Bunce Greenfield acquired the manuscript around 1880. The site of discovery is believed to be Theban Tomb 320 (TT 320), known as the "Royal Cache," near the necropolis of Deir el-Bahri. His wife, Edith Mary Greenfield, donated the manuscript in 1910 to the British Museum; the papyrus archive number is BM EA 10554-87. In 1912, Keeper of the Egyptian collection at the museum, Ernest Alfred Wallis Budge published a translation in the book The Greenfield papyrus in the British Museum - The funerary papyrus of Princess Nesitanebtȧshru, daughter of Painetchem II and Nesi-Khensu, and priestess of Ȧmen-R̄a at Thebes, about B.C. 970.

== See also ==
- Medjed (god)
- List of ancient Egyptian papyri
