= Ahhotep =

The names Ahhotep may refer to:

- Ahhotep I (c. 1560 – 1530 BCE), Ancient Egyptian queen who lived during the 17th dynasty, is believed to have been the wife of the ancient Egyptian pharaoh Seqenenre Tao and was the mother of Ahmose I.
- Ahhotep II, believed to have been the wife of the ancient Egyptian pharaoh Kamose, who reigned 1555-1550 BCE
