= Ahmose-Sitkamose =

Princess during the 17th–18th Dynasties of Egypt

- King's daughter Queen consort of Egypt; Great Royal Wife; God's Wife of Amun
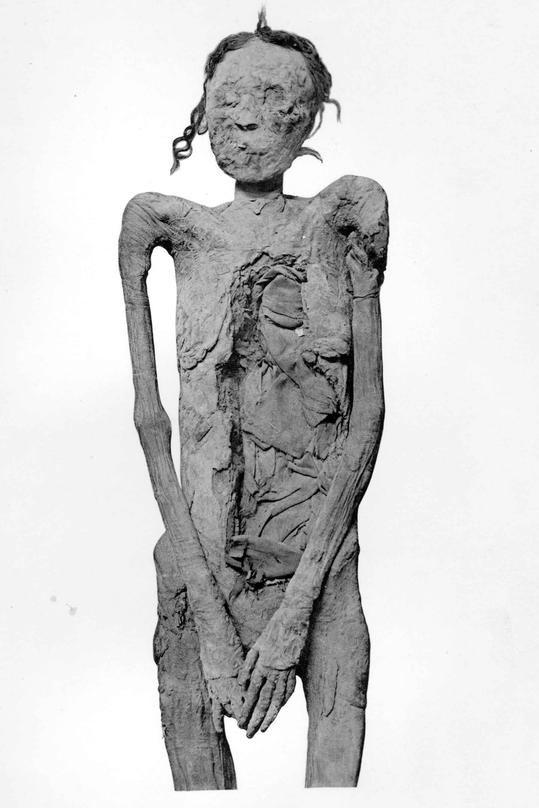
- Mummy of Ahmose-Sitkamose, found in DB320
- Born: Thebes
- Died: Thebes
- Burial: DB320, Thebes
- Spouse: Ahmose I
Egyptian name
G39 t H8 kA Z1 D52 E1
- Dynasty: 18th of Egypt
- Father: Kamose
- Mother: Ahhotep II
- Religion: Ancient Egyptian religion

Ahmose-Sitkamose, sometimes appearing as simply Sitkamose, was a princess during the late 17th–early 18th Dynasties of Egypt.

== Biography ==
She was the only known child of Kamose. She married her uncle Ahmose I and was given the titles of Great Royal Wife and God's Wife of Amun but they had no known children. Following the Egyptian tradition, Ahmose had other wives, including his sister Ahmose-Nefertari.

Sitkamose's mummy was discovered in 1881 in the Deir el-Bahari cache; it was in the coffin of a man named Pediamun who lived during the 21st Dynasty. Her mummy was unwrapped by Gaston Maspero on June 19, 1886. Sitkamose was, according to examinations, about thirty years old when she died. This confirms evidence that she died in her husband's year 18 (1533 BC) Grafton Eliot Smith described her as a strong-built, almost masculine woman. The mummy was damaged by tomb robbers. After her death, Ahmose I assigned the title of "Great Royal Wife" to queen Ahmose-Henuttamehu, and after her death, Ahmose-Nefertari, the mother of Amenhotep I.
