= Carnarvon Tablet =

Ancient Egyptian inscription

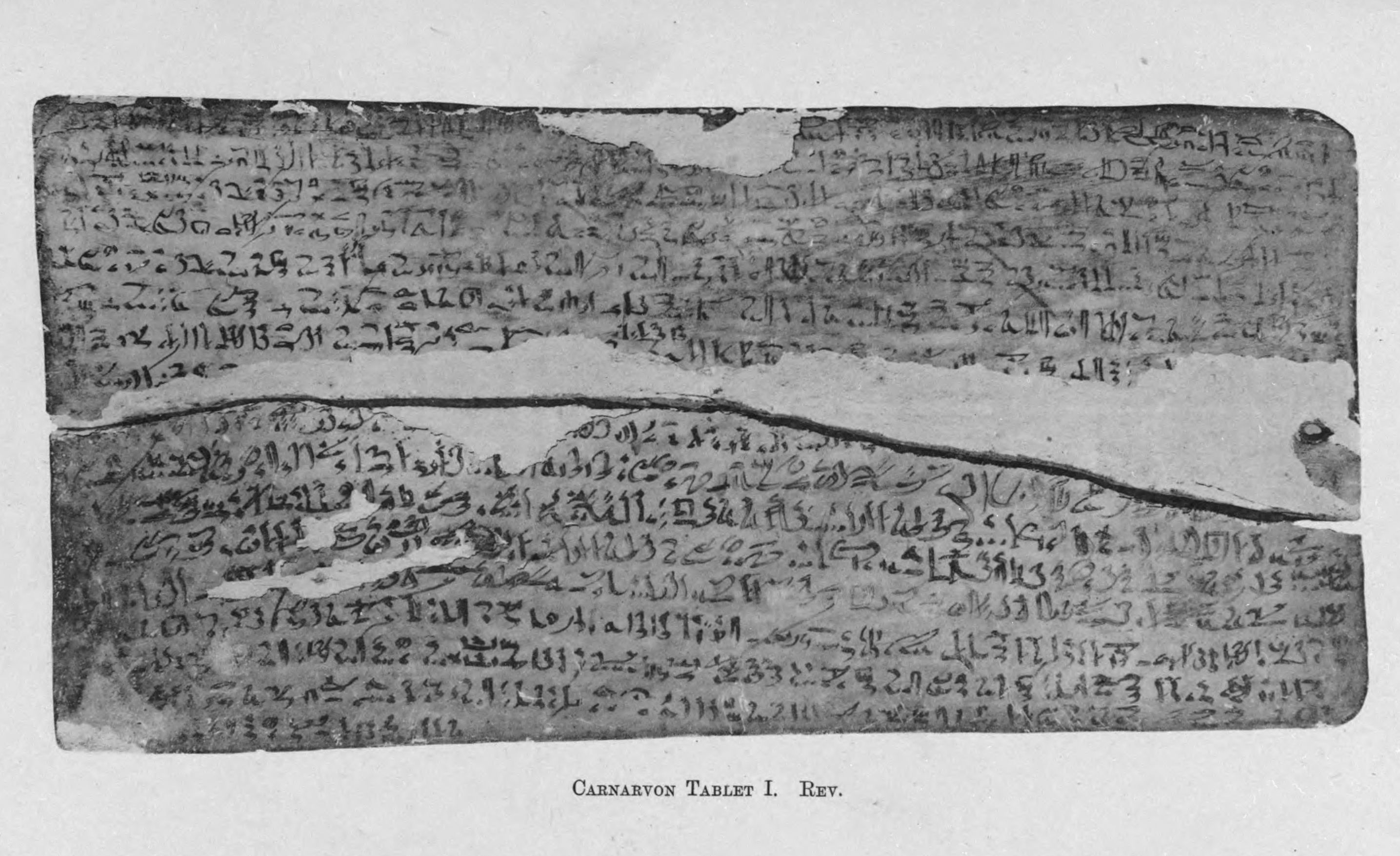
Carnarvon Tablet I

The Carnarvon Tablet is an ancient Egyptian inscription in hieratic recording the defeat of the Hyksos by Kamose.

Discovered in 1908 by Lord Carnarvon, it consists of two wooden tablets covered in stucco and fine plaster. The tablet, believed to be a schoolboy's exercise, contains a text that has proven to be historically significant. It preserves a copy of an inscription originally from commemorative stelae of Pharaoh Kamose, detailing his campaign against the Hyksos rulers in northern Egypt during the late Second Intermediate Period (c. 1550 BCE).

The Carnarvon Tablet was found near the entrance of a tomb in the Deir el-Bahari valley. Initially thought to date from the Seventeenth Dynasty of Egypt, it is now attributed to the early Eighteenth Dynasty of Egypt. The obverse of the first tablet describes Kamose's victory over the Hyksos, while the reverse contains the beginning of The Maxims of Ptahhotep. The second tablet bears a heavily damaged inscription.

The text's authenticity and historical importance were confirmed in the 1930s when fragments of the original stelae were discovered at Karnak. The Carnarvon Tablet has since become a valuable source for understanding the political climate of Egypt at the end of the Second Intermediate Period and the beginning of the New Kingdom.

== Discovery ==
It was found in 1908 by Lord Carnarvon on two wooden tablets covered stucco in fine plaster. It was discovered amongst pottery debris on a ledge close to the entrance of a tomb near the mouth of the Deir el-Bahari valley.

Howard Carter believed this tomb to date from the Seventeenth Dynasty. But actually it is now believed that the tablet goes back to the Eighteenth Dynasty of Egypt -- only a little later.

On the reverse side of tablet no. 1 is inscribed the beginning of The Maxims of Ptahhotep. On the obverse side of this tablet is a description of Kamose's victory over the Hyksos.

The tablet is believed to be a schoolboy's exercise, but the text proved to be very important.

As early as 1916, Sir Alan Gardiner assumed that the First Carnarvon Tablet must be a copy of some commemorative stela of pharaoh Kamose. Less than 20 years later, his thesis was confirmed when French Egyptologists Lacau and Chévrier were working on the Third Pylon of Karnak and made the important discovery of two stela fragments. The smallest of them was found in 1932. And in 1935, the larger fragment appeared.

Thus, it emerged that the text was copied from Kamose's stelas in Karnak. These newer stelae were published in 1939.

On tablet no. 2 there is a heavily damaged inscription.

== Contents ==
In the inscription, Kamose exclaims (in a translation by James B. Pritchard):

Let me understand what this strength of mine is for! (One) prince is in Avaris, another is in Ethiopia, and (here) I sit associated with an Asiatic and a Negro! Each man has his slice of this Egypt, dividing up the land with me. I cannot pass by him as far as Memphis, the waters of Egypt, (but), behold, he has Hermopolis. No man can settle down, being despoiled by the imposts of the Asiatics. I will grapple with him, that I may cut open his belly! My wish is to save Egypt and to smite the Asiatics!

Sir Alan Gardiner provides the following alternative translation, noting the control of Upper Egypt by the Kerma culture of Nubia:

I should like to know what serves this strength of mine, when a chieftain in Avaris, and another in Kush, and I sit united with an Asiatic and a Nubian, each in possession of his slice of Egypt, and I cannot pass by him as far as Memphis... No man can settle down, when despoiled by the taxes of the Asiatics. I will grapple with him, that I may rip open his belly! My wish is to save Egypt and to smite the Asiatic!"
