= Émile Brugsch =

German Egyptologist (1842–1930)

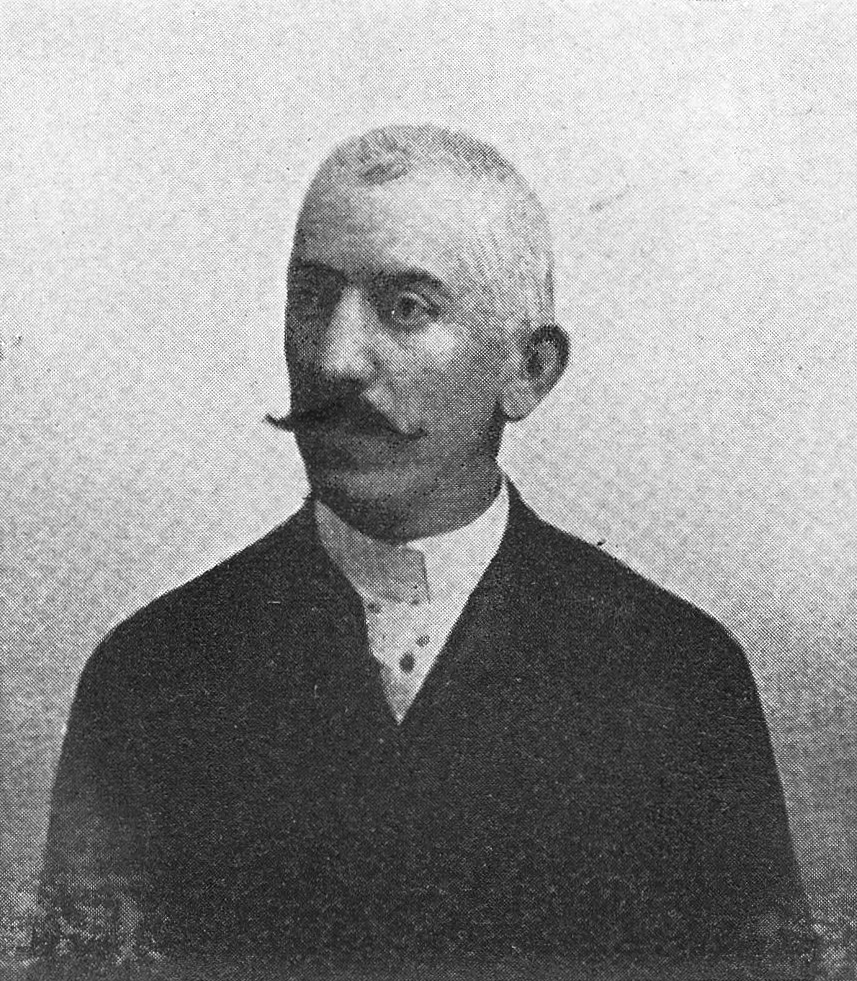
Émile Brugsch (1909)

Émile Brugsch (February 24, 1842 – January 14, 1930) was a German Egyptologist known for having thrown on the rubbish heap an arm found in the tomb of Djer which Ancient Egyptians believed was the tomb of Osiris. He was also the official who evacuated the mummies of the Royal Cache from Deir el-Bahari in 1881 without recording the plan of the tomb. This has fuelled speculation that he was involved in the pilfering of antiquities.

== Early life and education ==
Emil Charles Adalbert Brugsch was born in Berlin on 24 February 1842. His elder brother was the Egyptologist Heinrich Karl Brugsch, who was babysitting him. Brugsch did attend secondary school but received no higher education. The autobiography of Adolf Erman is a primary source on the Brugsch family.

== Career ==
In 1904, Brugsch was assistant curator of the Boulaq Museum, the core element of what is today's Egyptian Museum. He assisted occult writer Aleister Crowley by having the Stele of Revealing translated by his assistant. The Stele became an integral part of Crowley's religion of Thelema and the translation was integrated into its foundational philosophical text, The Book of the Law.

== Death and legacy ==
Brugsch has been described as leaving "behind him an evil reputation" through his dealings in Egypt. He died in Nice, France, aged 87.

== See also ==
- List of Egyptologists
- The Night of Counting the Years (Egyptian movie, 1969)
