= Ahhotep II =

- Queen consort of Egypt; Great Royal Wife
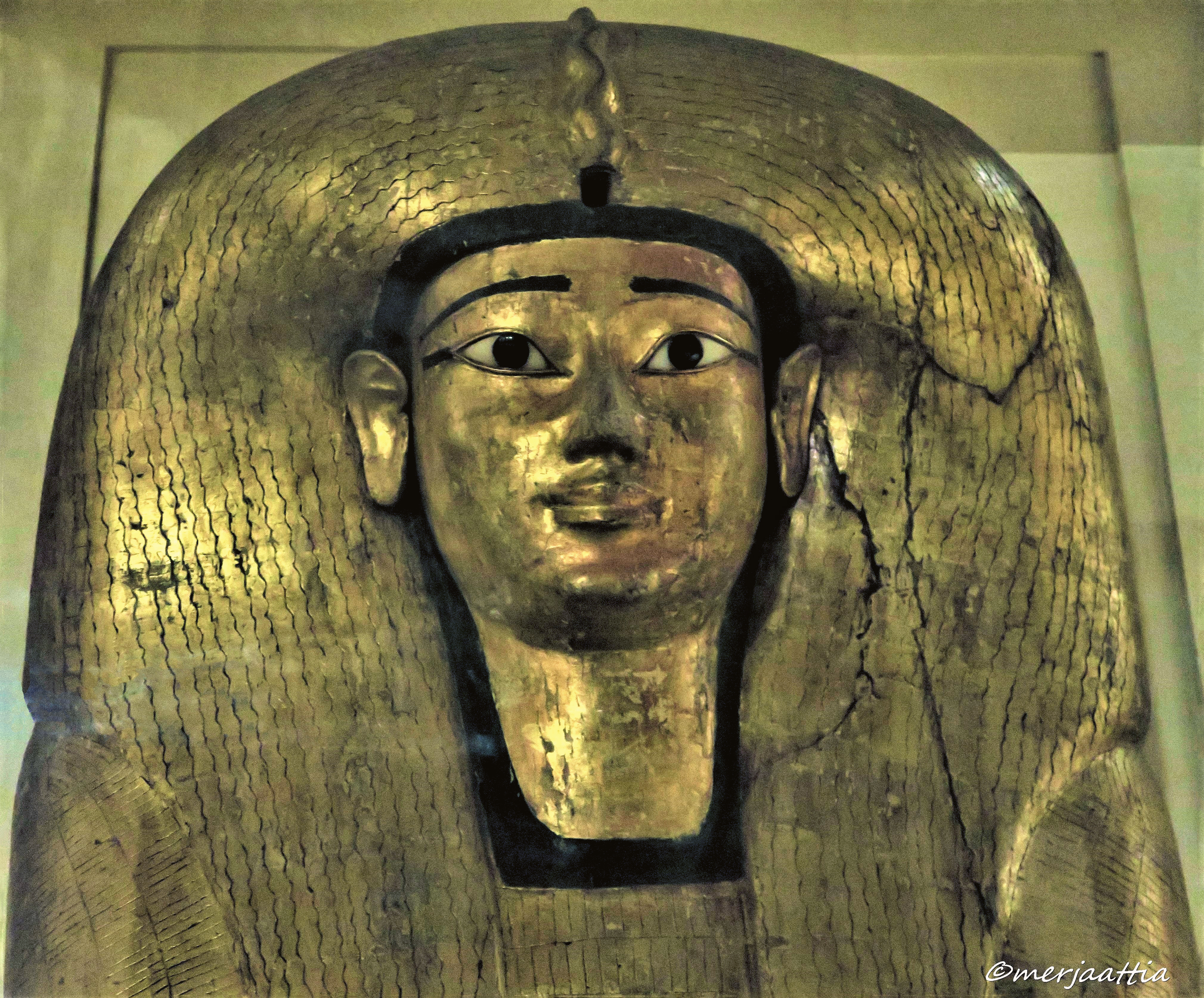
- Queen Ahhotep II's coffin from Dra' Abu el-Naga'
- Burial: Thebes?
- Spouse: Kamose (likely)
- Issue: Sitkamose
Egyptian name
iaH R4 t p
- Dynasty: 17th Dynasty
- Religion: Ancient Egyptian religion

Ahhotep II was an ancient Egyptian queen, and likely the Great Royal Wife of Pharaoh Kamose. Kamose was the last king of the Theban Seventeenth Dynasty of Egypt and, either the older brother of Ahmose I or a brother of Ahmose I's deceased father Seqenenre Tao, who took the throne at a moment of crisis after the death of Seqenenre on the battlefield at the hands of the Hyksos. Kamose's successor Ahmose I eventually reunified Egypt by expelling the Hyksos from Egypt and founded the powerful New Kingdom of Egypt.

In 1859, a team of Egyptian workers employed by French Egyptologist Auguste Mariette discovered a coffin at a dig site in Dra' Abu el-Naga. The coffin was identified as belonging to a queen named Ahhotep and inscribed with the titles "Great Royal Wife" and "She who is joined to the White Crown". While the coffin contained a mummy when first discovered, the body and bandaging were destroyed soon afterwards, leaving behind little evidence to confirm the identity of the coffin's inhabitant. Crucially, however, the coffin never held the title of King's Mother which implies that this Queen Ahhotep must be distinguished from Ahhotep I who is well attested to be the mother of Ahmose I. Therefore, she is called Ahhotep II by Marilina Betrò and in this wikipedia article. The treasures of the Dra' Abu el-Naga tomb contains various items that named the two kings Egyptian kings Kamose and Ahmose I.

== The royal titles and inscribed objects found in the Dra' Abu el-Naga tomb in 1859 ==
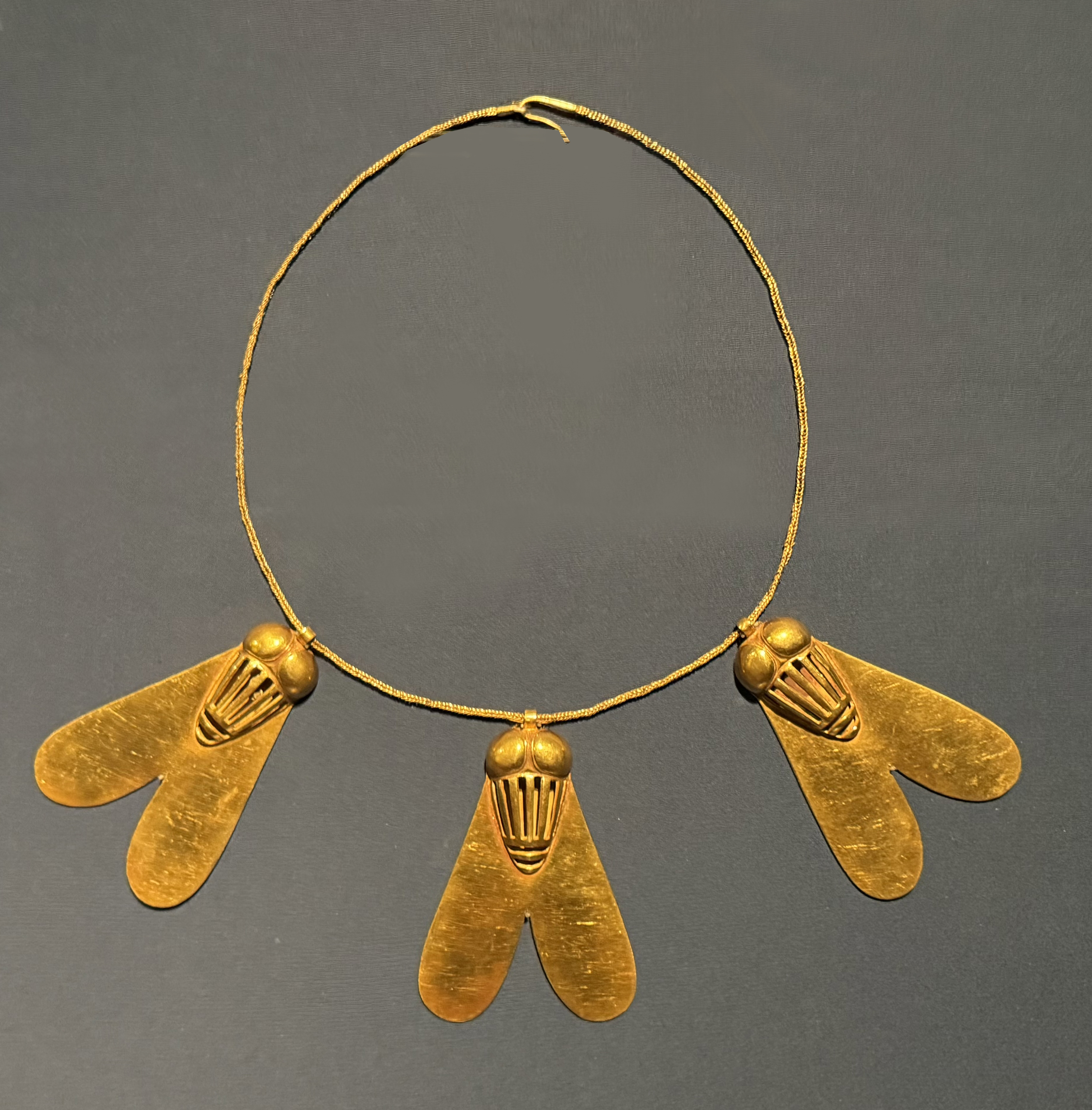
The Golden Flies military award necklace of Queen Ahhotep.

The Dra' Abu el-Naga coffin of Ahhotep II was:

"...inscribed for a queen named Ahhotep, bearing the titles ‘great royal wife’ (Hm.t nswtwr.t) and ‘she who joins the white crown’ (Xnm.tnfr HD). The titles 'king's mother' and 'king's wife' are absent, although the title 'she who joins the white crown' might have the same function as 'king's wife'. The epithet of the queen is nh ti dt (may she live forever), instead of the usual m3-xrw (attested in the inscriptions on other royal coffins of the same period), raises the question whether the coffin was prepared before the queen’s death. None of the objects found inside the coffin bore the queen's name.

The Dra' Abu el-Naga coffin of Ahhotep II contained:

"14 inscribed objects, five [of which] bear the name and praenomen of King Kamose (including one that is doubtful and another that bears only the praenomen, Wadjkheperre). Seven of the objects are attributed to Ahmose Nebpehtyre (ie. Ahmose I), and two bear only the royal name Ahmose (in one instance, this must be Ahmose Nebpehtyre because it is inscribed on bracelet [JE 4686] paired with a similar one [JE 4687] inscribed only with the Nebpehtyre). The armlet JE 4680 bears only the name Ahmose, but its attribution to Ahmose Nebpehtyre can be questioned due to the presence of another king called Ahmose (Senakhtenre) and the lack of the praenomen on the object."

== Different Ahhoteps ==
The naming or numbering by Egyptologists of the queens named Ahhotep has changed during the years.

During the late nineteenth century, Egyptologists thought that Ahhotep I was the wife of Seqenenre Tao. The coffins of Deir el-Bahari and Dra' Abu el-Naga were both thought by some experts to be hers. Also, Ahhotep II was thought to be the wife of Amenhotep I as the coffin from the Deir el-Bahari cache was considered to belong to a queen called Ahhotep II.

During the 1970s, it was noted that the Deir el-Bahari coffin bears the title King's Mother yet Amenhotep I had no son. Therefore, the title must refer to the mother of Ahmose I. In 1982, Robins suggested that Ahhotep I was the occupant of the gilded coffin from Dra' Abu el-Naga. Ahhotep II is the queen mentioned on the Deir el-Bahari coffin and Ahhotep III is the Queen mentioned on the statue of a prince Ahmose.

Following Dodson and Hilton (2004), it is now considered that Ahhotep I was the wife of Seqenenre Tao and the mother of Ahmose I. Ahhotep II is regarded as the queen identified from the gilded coffin found at Dra' Abu el-Naga and, therefore, possibly a wife of Kamose. It is no longer accepted that there was a queen called Ahhotep III.

== Family ==
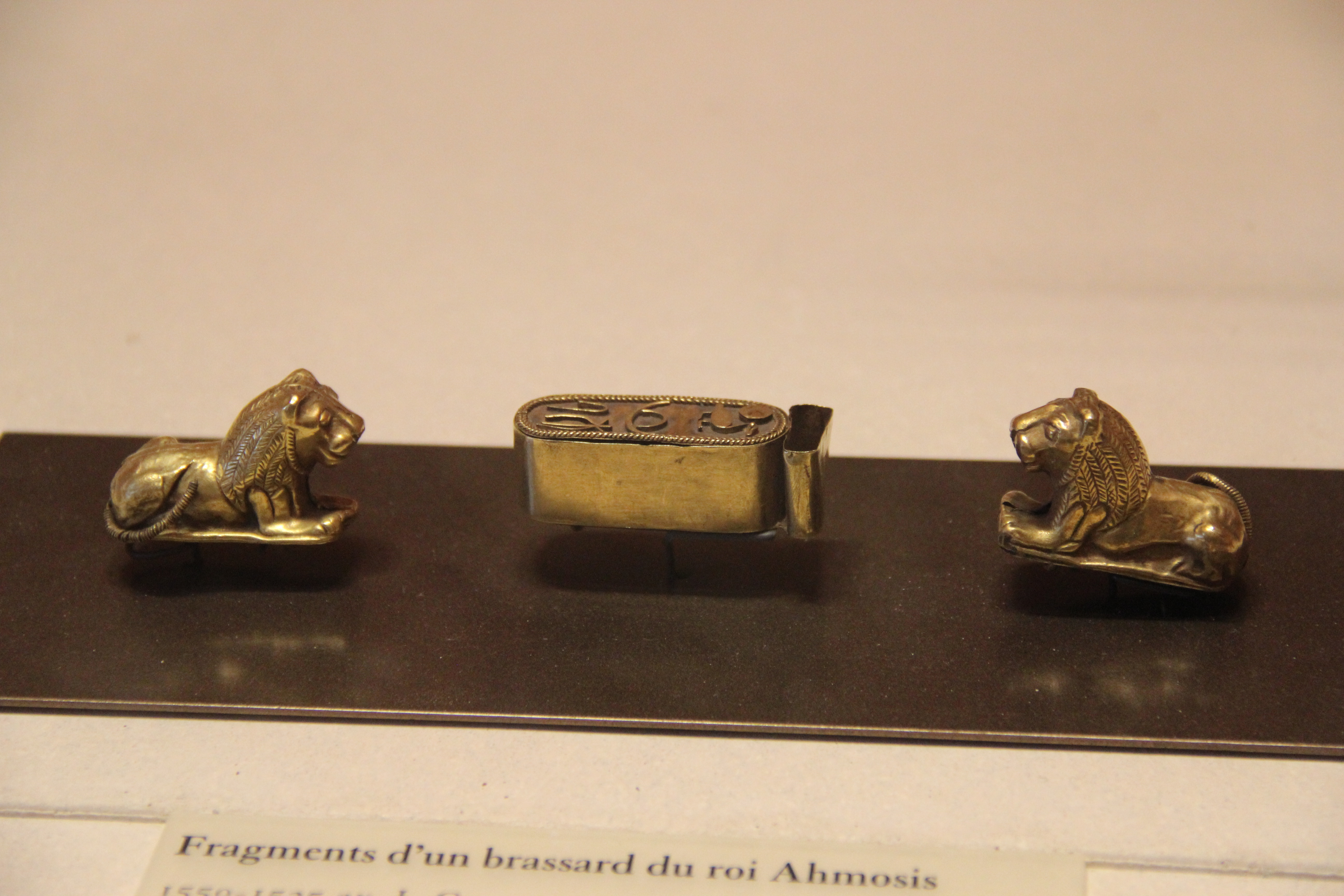
A set of gold armbands in the form of two lions and a box made by Ahmose I from Ahhotep II's tomb

Ahhotep II is thought to be the chief wife of Kamose and possibly the mother of Queen Ahmose-Sitkamose. It is possible but unlikely that Ahhotep II is identical to a queen known as Ahhotep I. If so, she may have been married to Seqenenre Tao instead.

The title of King's Mother is only found on the coffin from Deir el Bahari and not on the funerary equipment from Dra' Abu el-Naga'. It could be argued that Ahhotep II was a royal wife but never the mother of a pharaoh, and hence not the same person as Ahhotep I.

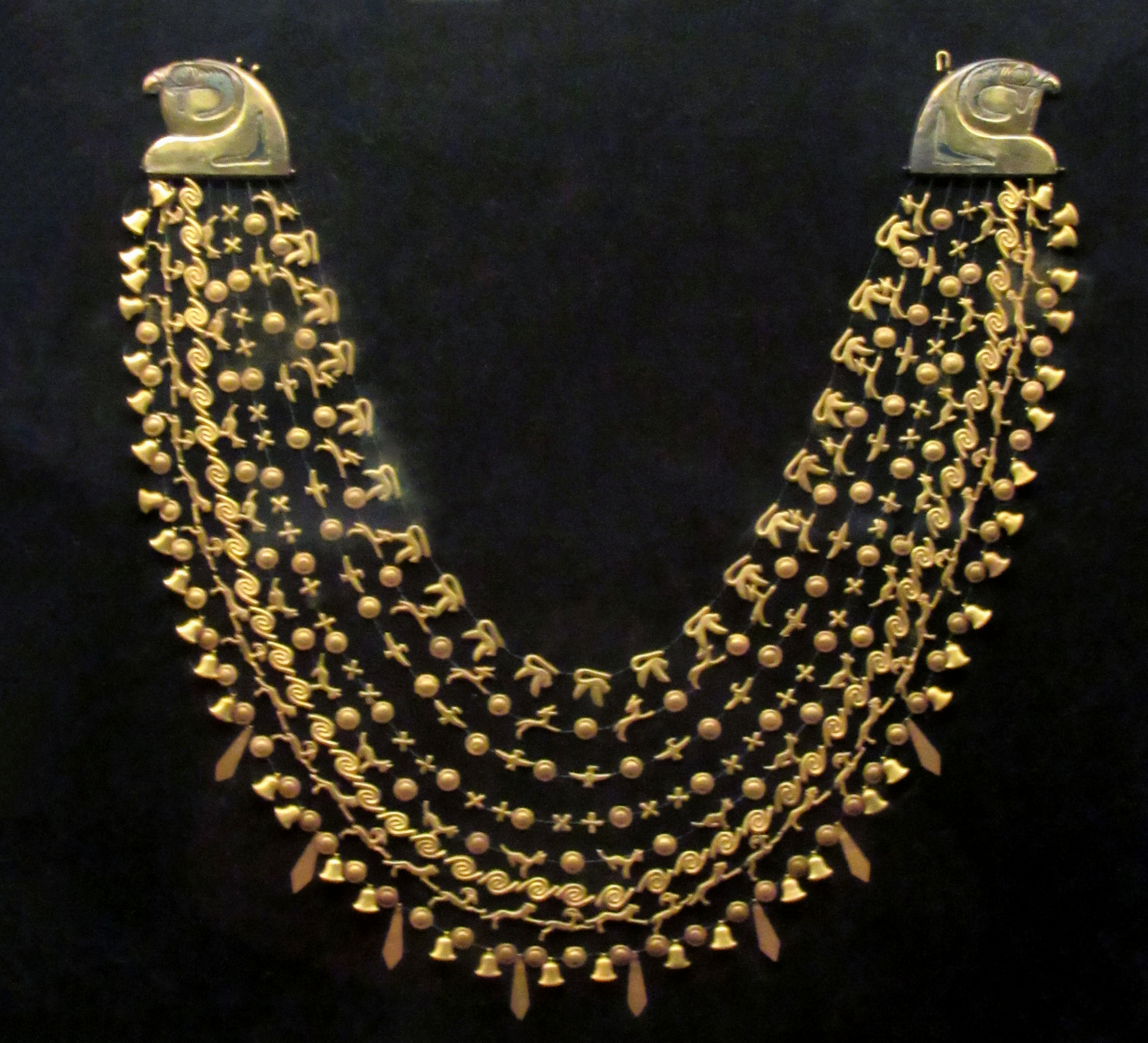
The Usekh collar of Ahhotep II from her tomb at Dra' Abu el-Naga'

== Burial ==
Ahhotep II was buried in Dra' Abu el-Naga and rediscovered in February 1859 by workmen employed by Auguste Mariette. The tomb contained her mummy (destroyed in 1859) and gold and silver jewelry. An inscribed ceremonial axe blade made of copper, gold, electrum and wood was decorated with a Minoan style griffin. Three golden flies were included and were awards usually given to people who served and acquitted themselves well in the army. A few items bore the name of Kamose, but more were inscribed with the name of Ahmose I. A Gold armband in the form of a box and two lions were also found in her tomb.

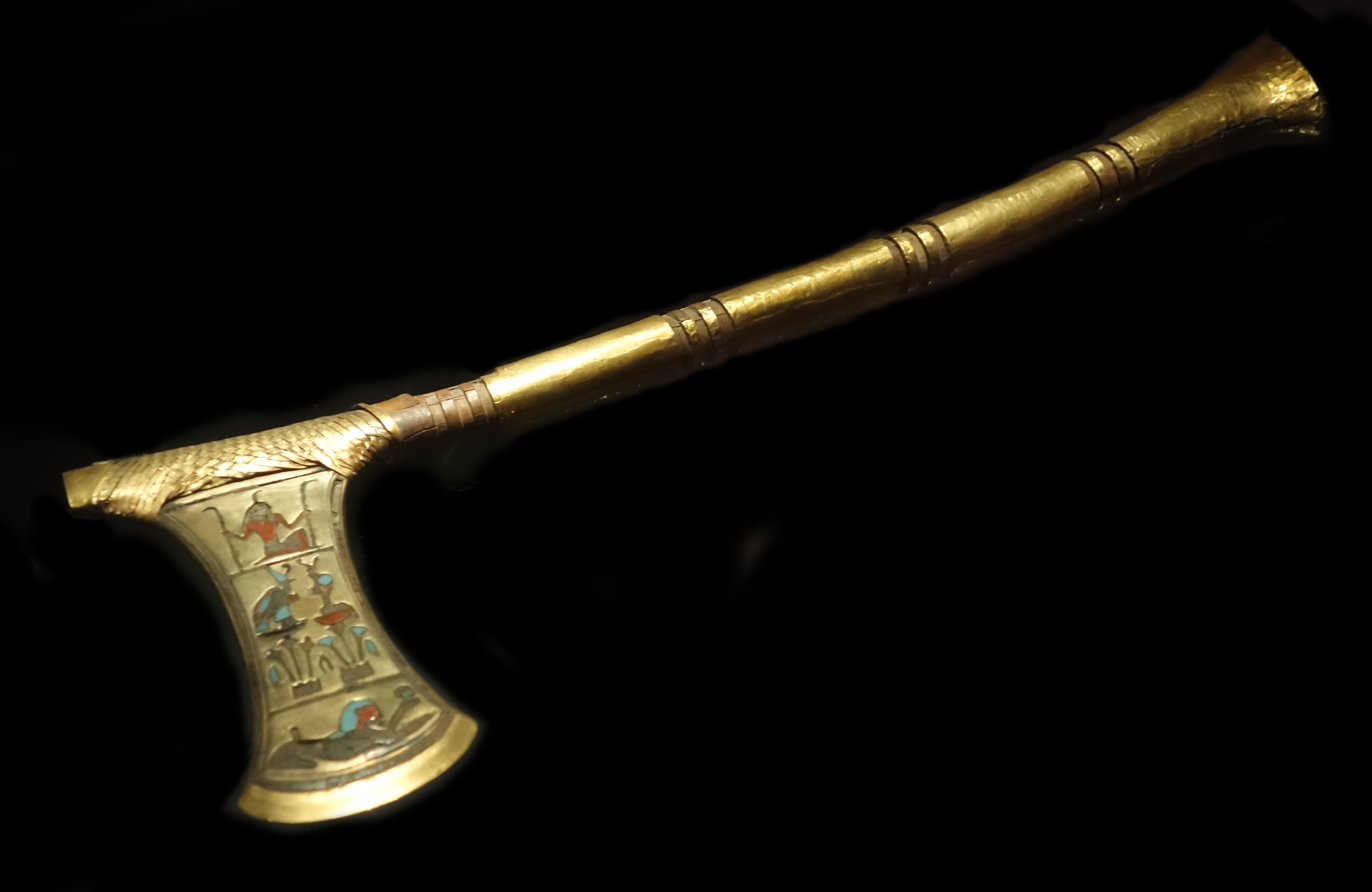
Ceremonial Axe in the name of Ahmose I, found in the tomb of queen Ahhotep II. This axe celebrates the victories of Ahmose. It bears the kings titulary, along with images of the king smiting an Asiatic enemy, and prayers for many years of rule. 18th dynasty, from Dra Abu el-Naga. CG 52645 / JE4673 Luxor Museum.

The Dra' Abu el-Naga coffin and the items associated with it all have inscriptions using an early form of the Iah glyph. The representation of the hieroglyph changed between years 18 and 22 of Ahmose I. The use of the early form of Iah suggests that Queen Ahhotep II died sometime before year 20 of Ahmose I. This suggests that this queen is not Ahhotep, mother of Ahmose, because that queen appears on a stela dated to Amenhotep I and possibly survived into the reign of Thutmose I.

== Silver boats and Golden Necklace of Flies ==
The tomb of queen Ahhotep II at Dra' Abu el-Naga contained both a gold and a silver boat, made by pharaoh Ahmose I. Ahhotep II's tomb also preserved a set of the famous Golden Necklace of Flies--which was an honorary military award in Ancient Egypt.

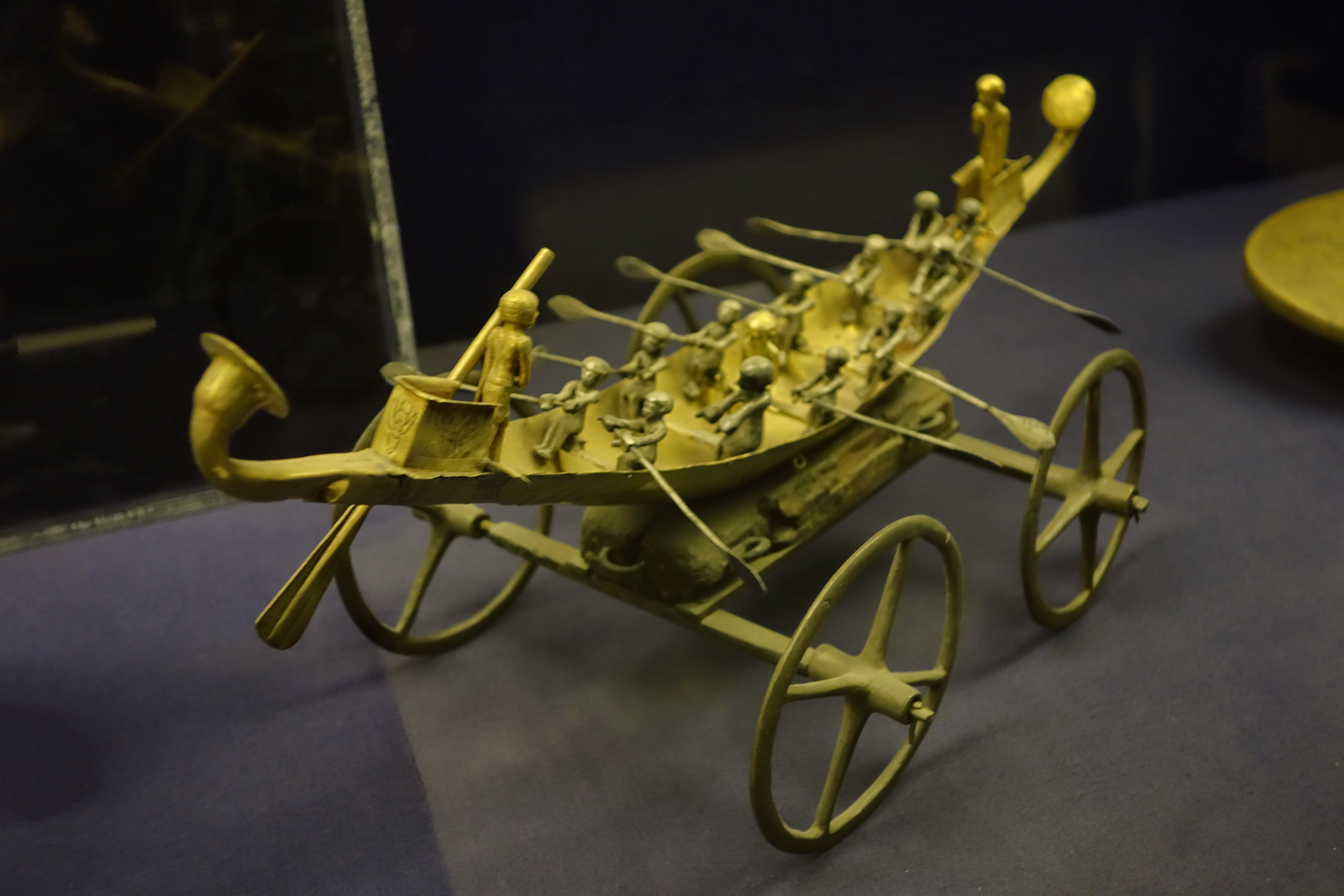
One of two, gold and silver, boats from Queen Ahhotep II's tomb

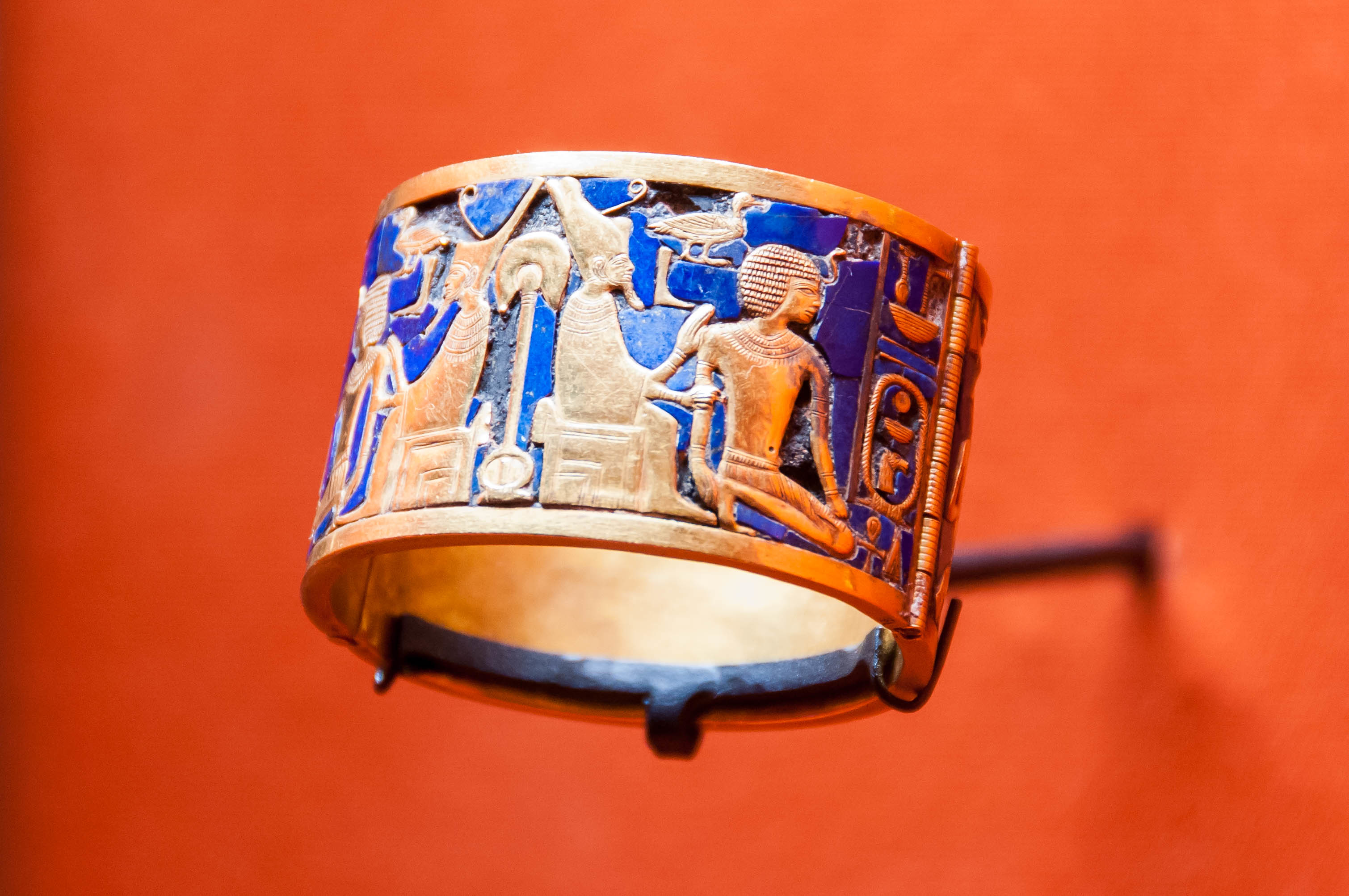
Bracelet of Ahhotep II naming Pharaoh Ahmose I in blue lapis lazuli stone, carved with hieroglyphs and figures of kings and thrones

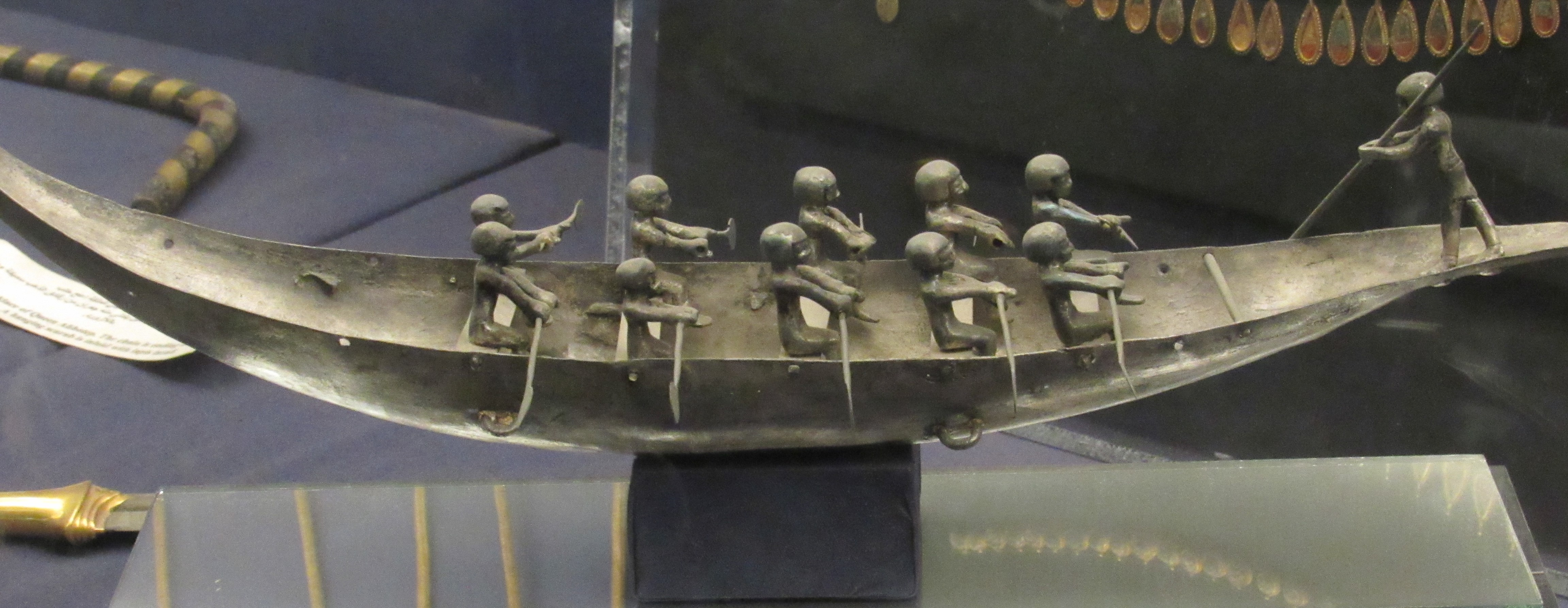
The silver boat from Ahhotep II's tomb

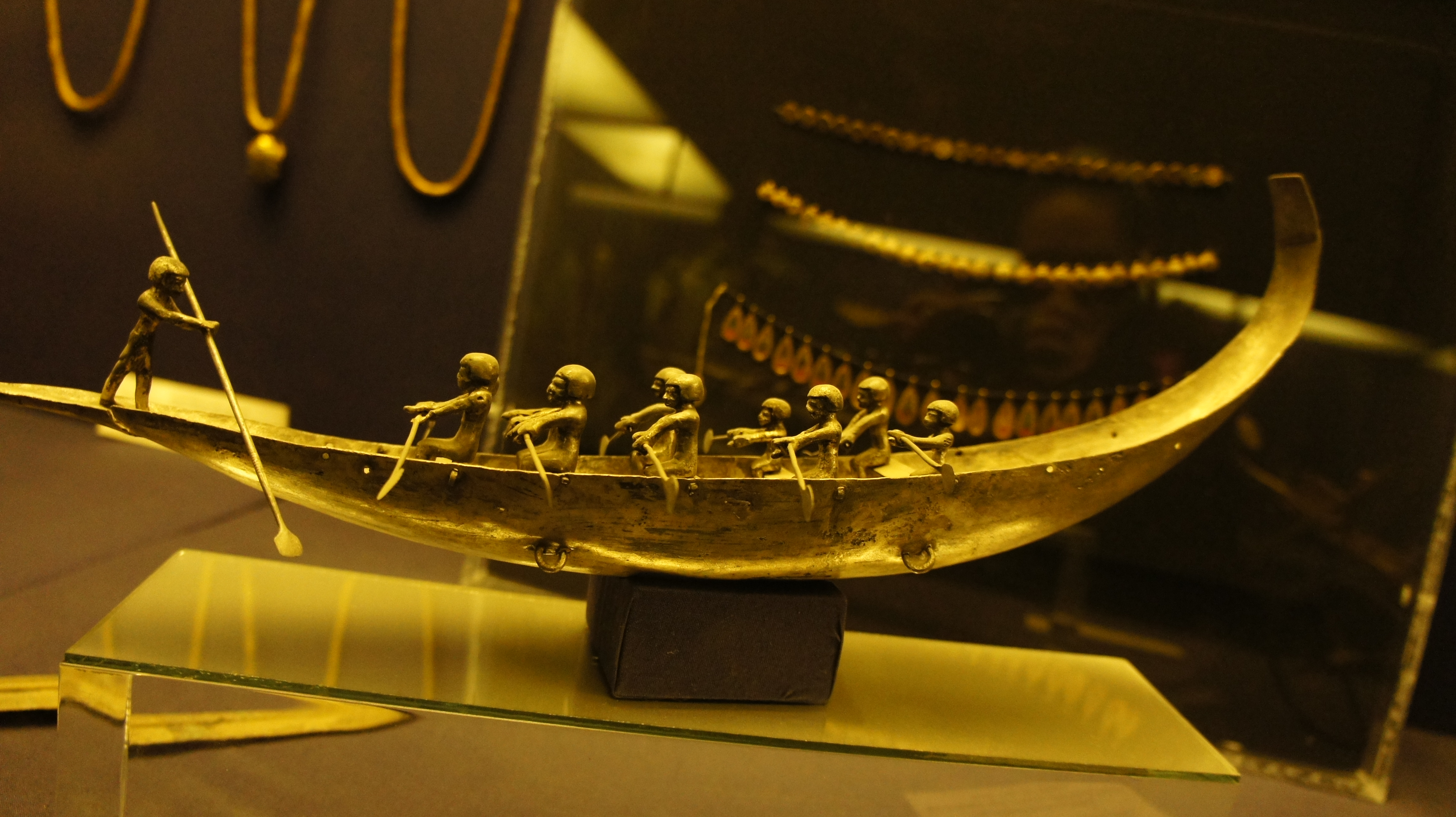
Another view of the silver boat from Ahhotep II's tomb

== Alternative theory ==
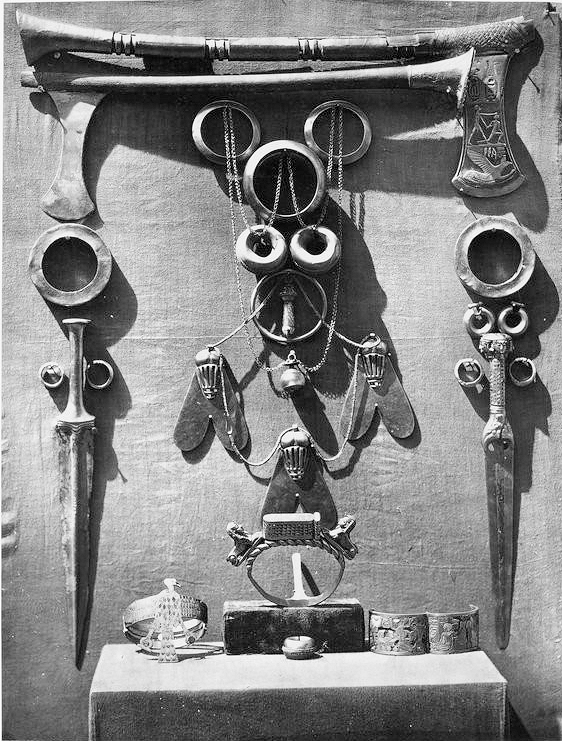
Jewelry and weapons found in the tomb of Ahhotep II

An alternative interpretation has been developed by Ann Macy Roth. In this interpretation, the pharaoh Seqenenre Tao had three queen consorts:

- Ahhotep I, who was the mother of a prince named Ahmose (not the future pharaoh) and several princesses named Ahmose.
- Sitdjehuti, who was the mother of a princess named Ahmose.
- Tetisheri, who was the mother of Kamose, Ahhotep II and Ahmose-Henuttamehu.

Kamose married his sister Ahhotep II and were then the parents of Ahmose I, Ahmose-Nefertari and Ahmose-Sitkamose.
