= Royal Cache =

Ancient Egyptian tomb

Theban tomb TT320
- Burial site of Pinedjem II and a Royal Cache
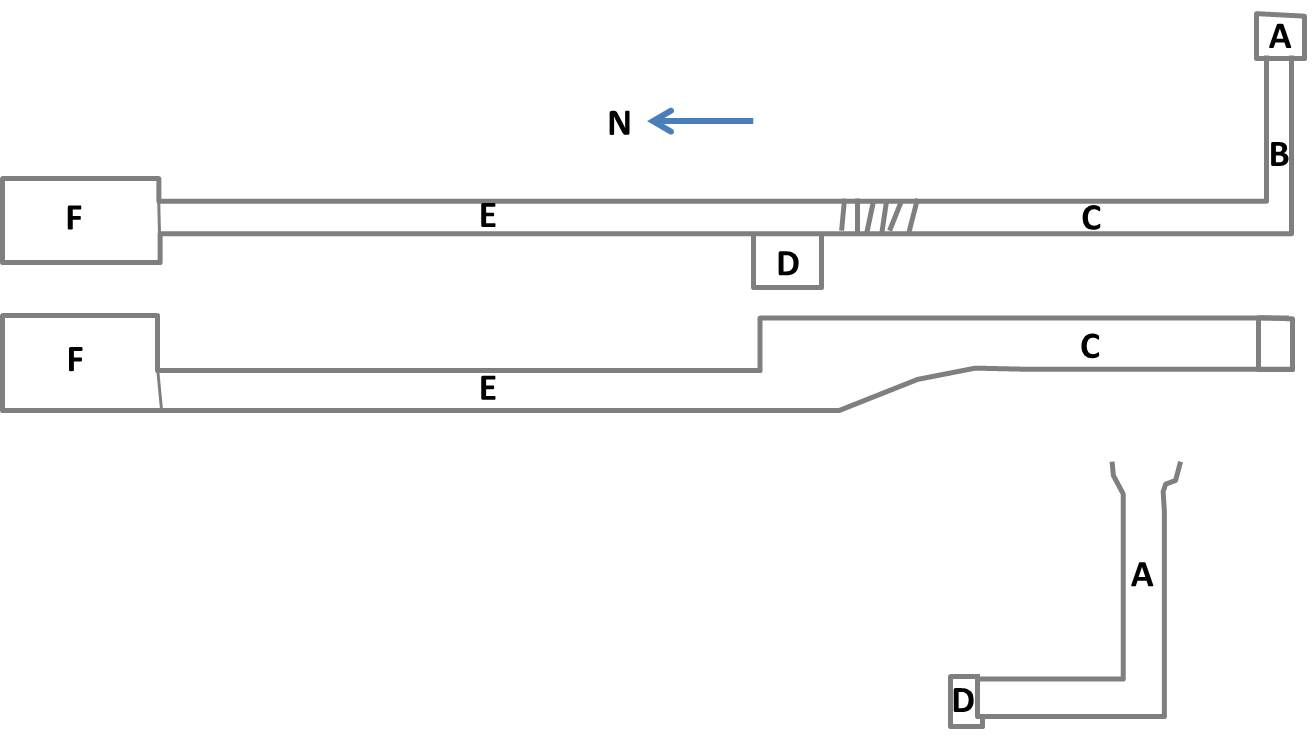
- Plan of TT320

- Location within Egypt
- Coordinates: 25°44′12.48″N 32°36′18.13″E
- Location: Deir el-Bahari, Theban Necropolis
- Discovered: 1881 (Officially)
- ← Previous; TT319 Next → TT321

The Royal Cache, technically known as TT320 (previously referred to as DB320), is an Ancient Egyptian tomb located next to Deir el-Bahari, in the Theban Necropolis, opposite the modern city of Luxor.

It contains an extraordinary collection of mummified remains and funeral equipment of more than 50 kings, queens, and other royal family members of the New Kingdom, as it was used as a cache for royal mummies during the Twenty-first Dynasty. The eleven pharaohs found there include one of the nine pharaohs from the 17th dynasty, five of the fifteen pharaohs from the 18th dynasty, three of the eight pharaohs from the 19th dynasty, and two of the ten pharaohs from the 20th dynasty. It is thought to be one of the first caches.The tomb was originally used as the last resting place of High Priest of Amun Pinedjem II, his wife Neskhons, and other close family members.

Its discovery by locals between 1860 and 1871, and by Egyptologists in 1881, caused a sensation. The mummies quickly became a highlight of the new Egyptian Museum (then in Giza). In 1969, the discovery was dramatized in The Night of Counting the Years, which became one of Egypt's most widely respected films. In 2021 the mummies were moved from the Egyptian Museum to a modern display area in the new National Museum of Egyptian Civilization, as the high-profile Pharaohs' Golden Parade.

== Usage ==
The tomb is thought to have initially been the last resting place of High Priest of Amun Pinedjem II, his wife Nesikhons, and other close family members. Pinedjem II died around 969 BCE, in a time of decline of the Egyptian kingdom, during which mummies from former dynasties were vulnerable to grave robbery. During Ramesses IX's reign, he had teams that went out and inspected the tombs of pharaohs. If it were discovered that repairs to the tomb or the mummy were needed, arrangements would be made to make the necessary repairs. The tombs that were inspected were found untouched at that time.

During Herihor's reign, however, some tombs and mummies were found to be in need of what they called "renewing the burial places". The tombs of Ramesses I, Seti I, and Ramesses II required "renewing" after pillaging, and this led to the royal mummies being moved to this tomb to protect them, with each coffin given dockets stating when they were moved and where they were reburied; some of the mummies had been moved multiple times before they were placed here. The mummies in need of "renewing" would be re-wrapped in linen and a linen docket would be added in order to keep accurate records of the mummies who were kept in the cache.

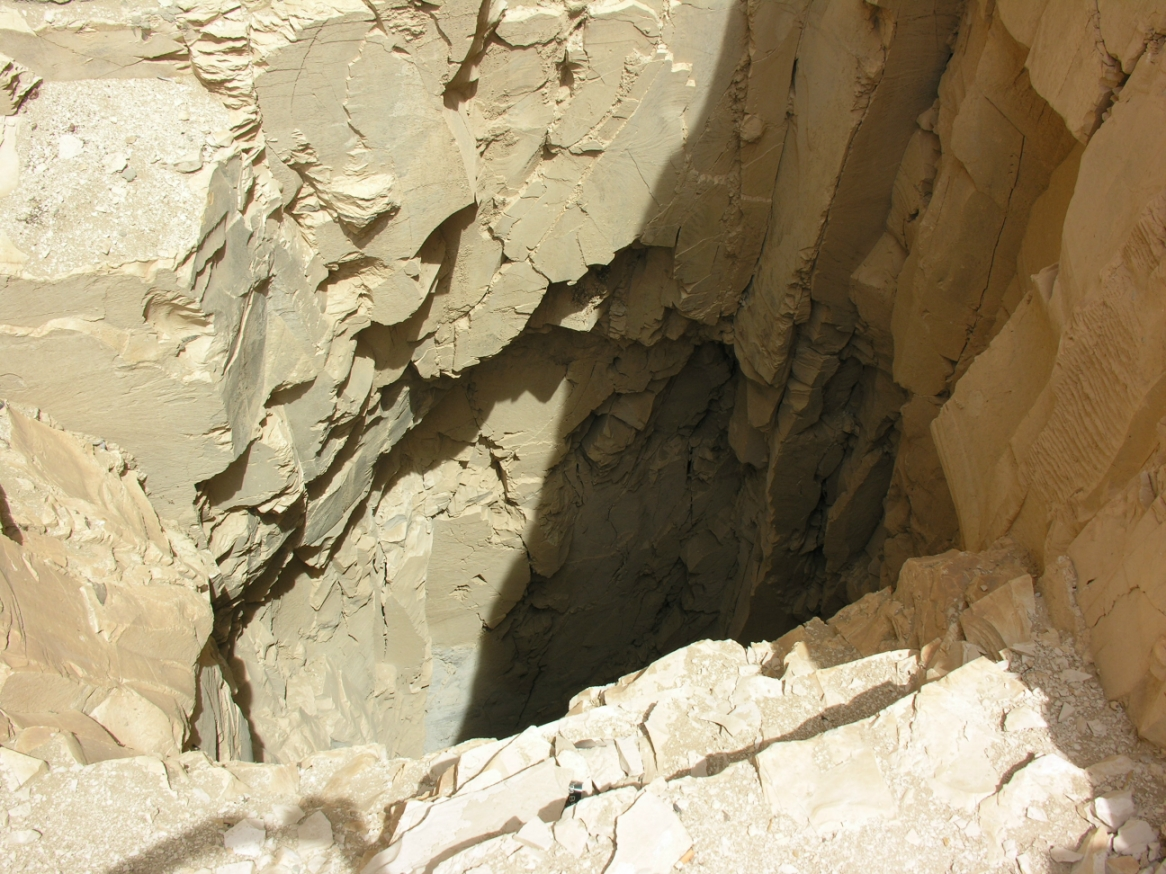
Entrance shaft of the royal cache

It was initially believed that this tomb originally belonged to an Eighteenth Dynasty queen who was found buried here. However, mummies were cached here in the Twenty-first Dynasty and the Eighteenth Dynasty queen was found at or near the entrance of the tomb, suggesting that she was placed in it last, which would indicate that this was not her tomb. If this was her tomb she would have been placed at the far, or back, end of the tomb. When the last of the mummies were placed in TT320, it seemed that the opening was naturally covered with sand and possibly other debris such as rocks, rendering it difficult to find. This aided in the purpose of moving the mummies into the TT320, the hidden aspect of the tomb was the reasoning behind choosing it as the resting place for many mummies in hopes to avoid additional grave robberies.

== Discovery in 1881 ==
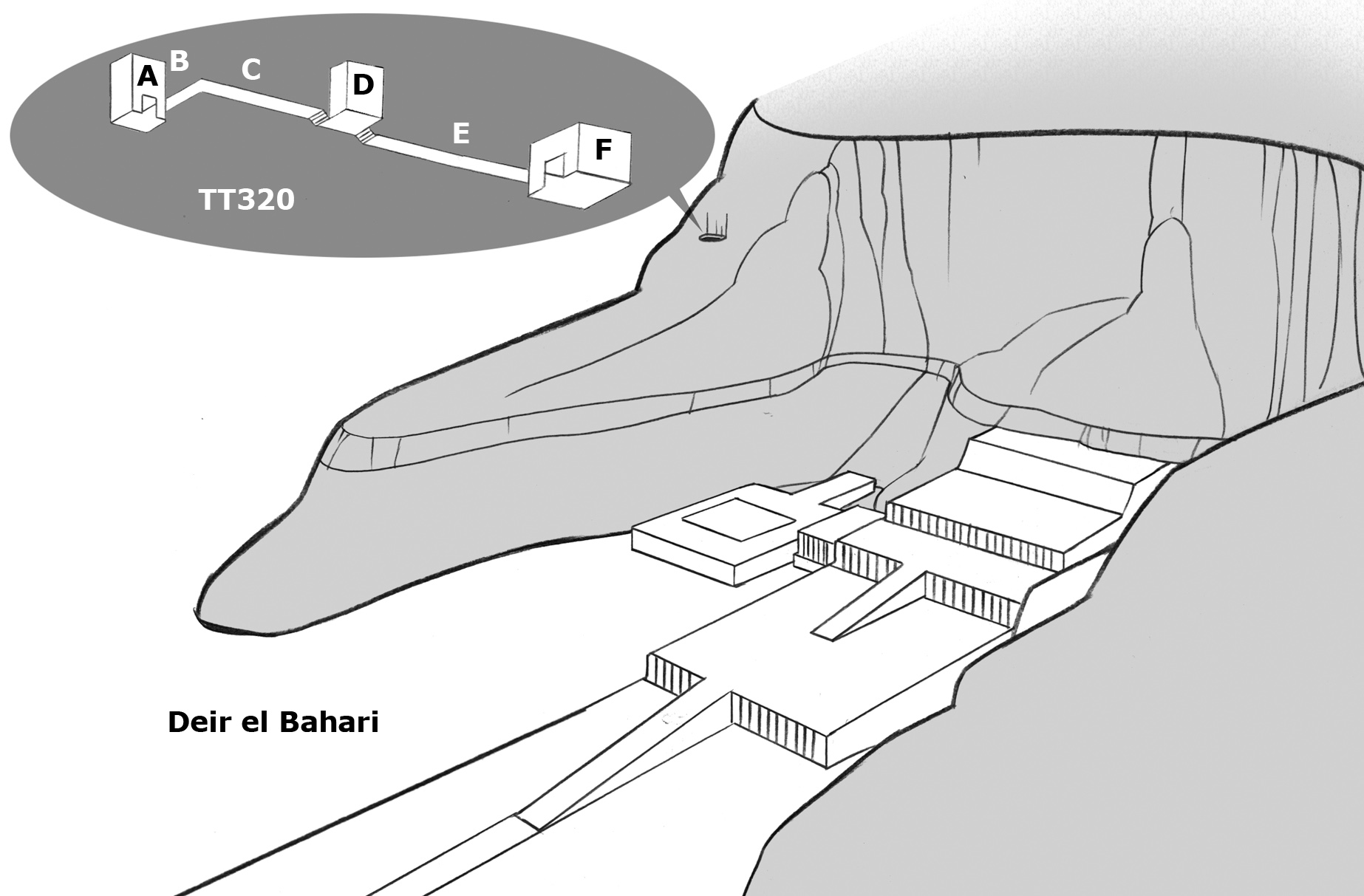
The location of the tomb above the Mortuary Temple of Hatshepsut at Deir el-Bahari

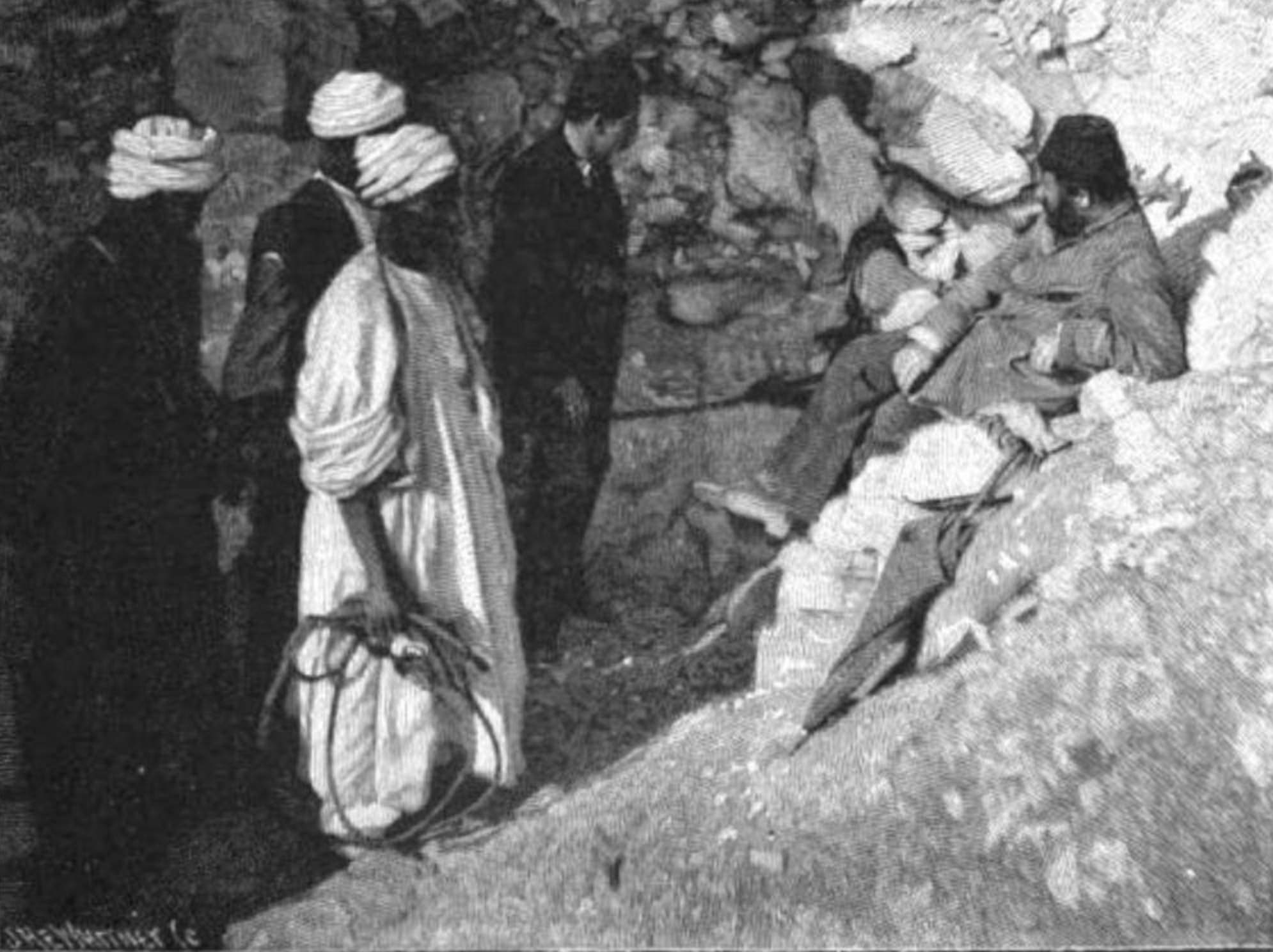
Gaston Maspero (sitting), Émile Brugsch (middle), and Mohammed Abd-er-Rasoul (holding the rope) photographed at the entrance to the tomb by Edward Livingston Wilson

In 1881, the location of TT320 became publicly known. Later research, conducted by Gaston Maspero, stated that members of the local Abd el-Rassul family discovered TT320 as early as 1871, because items such as canopic jars and funeral papyri from this tomb showed up on the antiquities market in Luxor as early as 1874 (the reidentification and repatriation of the mummy of Ramesses I in 2003 shows that the Abd el-Rassul family may have actually discovered TT320 as early as 1860). For example, the Book of the Dead of Pinedjem II was purchased in 1876 for £400. The story that Ahmed Abd el-Rassul told was that one of his goats fell down a shaft and when he went down the shaft to retrieve the goat, he stumbled across this tomb. As he looked around, he discovered that this was no ordinary tomb. He saw that the mummies entombed in TT 320 were royal. This was indicated by the royal cobra head dress on some of the coffins. Local authorities were expecting to find several tombs belonging to the family of Herihor. When items started appearing on the antiquities market with their names on them, local authorities started to investigate the items and were able to trace them back to the Abd el-Rassul family. Authorities interrogated and tortured the two brothers but they denied everything. Finally, in 1881 after a family quarrel, one of the brothers eventually gave up the location of the tomb where the items were plundered from. Authorities were sent out to TT320 immediately to secure it.

On July 6, 1881, authorities arrived at TT320 without the head of the Egyptian Service of Antiquities, because he was on vacation. Instead, the only other European member of the team, Émile Brugsch, was sent with one of the first Egyptian Egyptologists, Ahmed Kamal, to explore and examine TT320. Rather than just exploring, Brugsch had all of the contents, including the mummies, of this tomb removed within 48 hours of them entering this tomb. Neither Brugsch nor Kamal documented the tomb before having the contents removed, which made future study of this tomb difficult. Locations of the coffins were not documented and items were not catalogued. Brugsch later went back to document the tomb but was unable to remember considerable details. The removal of the items from TT320 so quickly presented problems that the removal team at the time did not take into account.

== Removal and transit ==
The removal of artifacts from TT320 was conducted in a manner that lacked adequate care. Upon their arrival in Cairo, several coffins were found to exhibit damage consistent with impacts sustained during handling or transport. Analysis indicated that this damage likely occurred during the initial extraction of the items from the tomb. Brugsch documented the height of the different parts of the tomb and the measurement of the opening was just big enough to drag out the coffins. In addition to this, there were fragments of royal coffins and other items found in the bottom meter of debris in TT320. However, there were approximately ten coffins that were found with their foot ends missing. It is believed that this happened before they were placed in TT320 because there was no mention, by Brugsch, of foot ends whether they were whole, in pieces or fragments being found. A research team entered TT320 in 1998 for research and that team did not find any evidence of foot ends either.

Once the coffins/mummies and items made it back to Cairo they were examined. It became clear that some of the mummies were found in the wrong coffins and that they were in different stages of preservation. For instance, the bandages around some of the bodies had been ripped apart in earlier times in order to remove any precious ornaments, such as amulets that were placed on the bodies for protection.

Considering the inconsistencies of some of the mummies mentioned previously, one mummy in particular raises many questions due to inconsistencies in two of his papyri. The first papyrus, Book of the Dead of Djedptahiufankh A, was read incorrectly. The person who read it thought that one of Djedptahiuefankh A's titles was part of his name. On the second papyrus, the Amduat papyrus, Djedptahiuefankh A's first title was "the third prophet of Amun". However, he is called "the second prophet of Amun" on his coffin. This is thought to be because the items that had "the third prophet of Amun" were prepared prior to him reaching the position of "the second prophet of Amun". Djedptahiuefankh was believed to be royal because on the Amduat papyrus his "priestly title" is immediately followed by "the king's son" and that is followed by "of Ramesses". Similar text is found on the Book of the Dead papyrus with one exception, "the king's son" is followed by "of the lord of the two lands". This title is what gave the impression that he was royal, but that title does not mean that he was royal. In fact it is believed that he was not royal at all. Cynthia Sheikholeslami says that "It is clear that the actual title [of Djedptahiuefankh] should be understood as 'king's son of Ramesses' rather than as an indication of membership in the royal family". There are eight other individuals known to hold this same title. It is argued that this title was given to someone from a certain region, more specifically a town in the Delta called Ramesses.

"Two fragments of undyed linen cloth. These textiles come from the Royal Cache at Deir el-Bahri and was associated with the mummy of Pinudjem II."

The chamber is reached by a nearly vertical chimney, which was left open in 1881, and has since filled with rocks and other debris (in fact every object that was left in the tomb has now been damaged in some way). It was reinvestigated in 1938. Since 1998 a Russian-German team led by Erhart Graefe has been working on reinvestigating and preserving the tomb.

== Recent work ==
Research teams have entered TT320 a number of times since its discovery, but the most successful research team entered TT320 in 1998. They cleared the passageways of fallen debris such as stones and fallen walls. They were able to find fragments of coffins and other small items. They were able to see some paintings after clearing debris away from the walls. These paintings, coupled with the archaeological fragments and the coffins, led this research team to conclude that this tomb was originally owned by a family from the Twenty-first Dynasty as a family tomb.

In 2017 there was a campaign by the Complutense University of Madrid and the Center for the Study and Documentation of Ancient Egypt of the Ministry for Tourism and Antiquities, done for a project titled the "Royal Cache Wadi C2 Project". There have been in total six campaigns in the field in Egypt. The team with the project are looking into understanding Wadi as a place instead of working to understand the contents it once held. The team working on the project believes that instead of the tomb being used as place to hide mummies and artifacts from grave robbers it was potentially a religious site. Many anomalies based upon the high amount of ancient graffiti in the area aroused suspicion about the purpose of the tomb. This team is actively working to find proof to back their theory about Wadi and the Royal Cache.

== List of mummies ==
Dynasty	Image	Name	Title	Comments
17th		Tetisheri (?)	Great Royal Wife	Now disputed.
17th		Seqenenre Tao	Pharaoh	
17th		Ahmose-Inhapi	Queen	
17th		Ahmose-Henutemipet	Princess	
17th		Ahmose-Henuttamehu	Great Royal Wife	
17th		Ahmose-Meritamon	Great Royal Wife	
17th		Ahmose-Sipair	Prince	Now disputed.
17th		Ahmose-Sitkamose	Great Royal Wife	
18th		Ahmose I	Pharaoh	
18th		Ahmose-Nefertari	Great Royal Wife	Now disputed.
18th		Rai	Royal nurse	Nurse of Ahmose-Nefertari
18th		Siamun	Prince	
18th		Ahmose-Sitamun	Princess	
18th		Amenhotep I	Pharaoh	
18th		Thutmose I	Pharaoh	Now disputed
18th		Baket (?)	Princess	Possibly Baketamun (?)
18th		Thutmose II	Pharaoh	
18th		Thutmose III	Pharaoh	
18th		Unknown man C		Possibly Senenmut
19th		Ramesses I	Pharaoh	
19th		Seti I	Pharaoh	
19th		Ramesses II	Pharaoh	
20th		Ramesses III	Pharaoh	
20th		Ramesses IX	Pharaoh	
21st		Nodjmet	Queen	Wife of Herihor
21st		Pinedjem I	High Priest of Amun	
21st		Duathathor-Henuttawy	Wife of Pinedjem I	
21st		Maatkare	God's Wife of Amun	Daughter of Pinedjem I
21st		Masaharta	High Priest of Amun	Son of Pinedjem I
21st		Tayuheret	Singer of Amun	Possible wife of Masaharta
21st		Pinedjem II	High Priest of Amun	
21st		Isetemkheb D	Chief of the Harem of Amun-Re	Wife of Pinedjem II
21st		Neskhons	First Chantress of Amun; King's Son of Kush	Wife of Pinedjem II
21st		Djedptahiufankh	Fourth Prophet of Amun	
21st		Nesitanebetashru		Wife of Djedptahiufankh
?		Unknown man E		Bob Brier suggested the mummy in question is Pentawer, one of the progeny of Ramses III. In 2012 DNA analysis confirmed a father-son relationship with Pentawer's known father, Ramesses III.
?	Eight other unidentified mummies; funerary remains of Hatshepsut			

== See also ==
- List of Theban tombs
- KV35 – Mummy cache in tomb of Amenhotep II
- The Night of Counting the Years – A 1969 Egyptian film based on the story of the Abd el-Rasuls
