= Medjed =

Ancient Egyptian deity

- Drawing of Medjed based on the Papyrus Cairo JE 95658
Name in hieroglyphs
G20 D&d Aa24 D40 A40
- Abode: Duat

In Ancient Egyptian religion, Medjed (Egyptological: mḏd), also known as Medjedu (Egyptological: mḏdw) is a minor deity (Note: Medjed is sometimes referred to as a "demon". However, unlike the contemporary understanding of demons as purely malevolent supernatural entities, the term is often used by Egyptologists in reference to a variety of supernatural entities, including ghosts, evil or benevolent spirits, minor deities, representations of chaos, and even "personifications of the destructive aspects of the [major] gods".) mentioned in certain copies of the Book of the Dead.

Very little is known about Medjed. His ghost-like depiction in the Greenfield Papyrus was spread across Japanese social media in 2012, making him popular in Japanese popular culture and leading to his appearance in video games, anime, manga, and various other forms of Japanese art.

== In the Book of the Dead ==
The Book of the Dead is made up of a number of individual Ancient Egyptian funerary texts with accompanying illustrations. They are in general written on papyrus and were used from the earliest period of the New Kingdom (c. 1550 BCE) until around 50 BCE. These texts consist of magic spells, some of which are to grant the dead person mystical knowledge in the afterlife, or to give them control over the world around them through their journey in the Duat, or underworld.

Of the Book of the Dead copies that have been found, a limited number reference an obscure entity in spell 17b named "Medjed" (also spelled "Metchet"), which means "The Smiter". In an English translation of the Papyrus of Ani, Raymond O. Faulkner renders the portion of the spell referring to Medjed as follows:

I know the name of that smiter [i.e., Medjed] among them who belongs to the House of Osiris, who shoots with his eyes, yet is unseen. The sky is encircled with the fiery blast of his mouth and Hāpi makes report, yet he is unseen.

Apart from this short passage, nothing is known about Medjed. Hermann Grapow proposed that Medjed could refer to a star (given that Medjed is said to radiate light and to have a connection with the cyclical flooding of the Nile), but as Ilaria Cariddi notes, the name is never written with a star determinative.

=== Visual depictions ===
According to Ilaria Cariddi, visual representations of Medjed can be found on only nine papyrus scrolls, all of which date to around the time of Egypt's Twenty-first Dynasty (1077–943 BCE). These scrolls (of which the Greenfield papyrus is arguably the most well-known) are as follows:

Papyrus	Date	Location	Citation
Papyrus Bodmer 101	Twenty-first Dynasty	Bodmer Foundation	
Papyrus Bodmer 102	Twenty-first Dynasty	Bodmer Foundation	
Papyrus Turin 1818	Twenty-first Dynasty	Museo Egizio	
Papyrus Bodmer 100	Mid-Twenty-first Dynasty	Bodmer Foundation	
Papyrus London BMEA 9948	Mid-Twenty-first Dynasty	British Museum	
Papyrus Cairo S.R. VII 10222	Mid- or late Twenty-first Dynasty	Egyptian Museum	
Papyrus Cairo JE 95658	Late Twenty-first Dynasty	Egyptian Museum	
Papyrus Cairo JE 95637	Late Twenty-first Dynasty	Egyptian Museum	
Papyrus Greenfield	Late Twenty-first Dynasty/ Early Twenty-second Dynasty	British Museum	

In these scrolls, Medjed is depicted as a dome with eyes, supported by two human-like feet. A few scrolls also portray the deity with a red knotted belt above or below his eyes. The scholars E. A. Wallis Budge, H. Milde, and Mykola Tarasenko have argued that Medjed's dome-like torso is either a shroud or a "shapeless body" that symbolizes the deity's imperceptible nature, and Cariddi has proposed that Medjed's prominent eyes and legs could signify that he can "see, move and act even though humans cannot perceive him". In contrast, Bernard Bruyère and Terence DuQuesne have contended that Medjed is actually a personification of an oil jar, and that his red "belt" is actually a stylized lid fastener.

== In popular culture ==
After the Greenfield papyrus illustrations were exhibited in 2012 at the Mori Art Museum in Tokyo and the Fukuoka Museum of Art, Medjed became an internet meme on Japanese social media, thanks largely to his "cartoon ghost"-like appearance. He has since entered into Japanese popular culture and has appeared in video games (e.g., Fate/Grand Order, Persona 5) and anime (e.g., Kamigami no Ki and Oh, Suddenly Egyptian God).

== Gallery ==
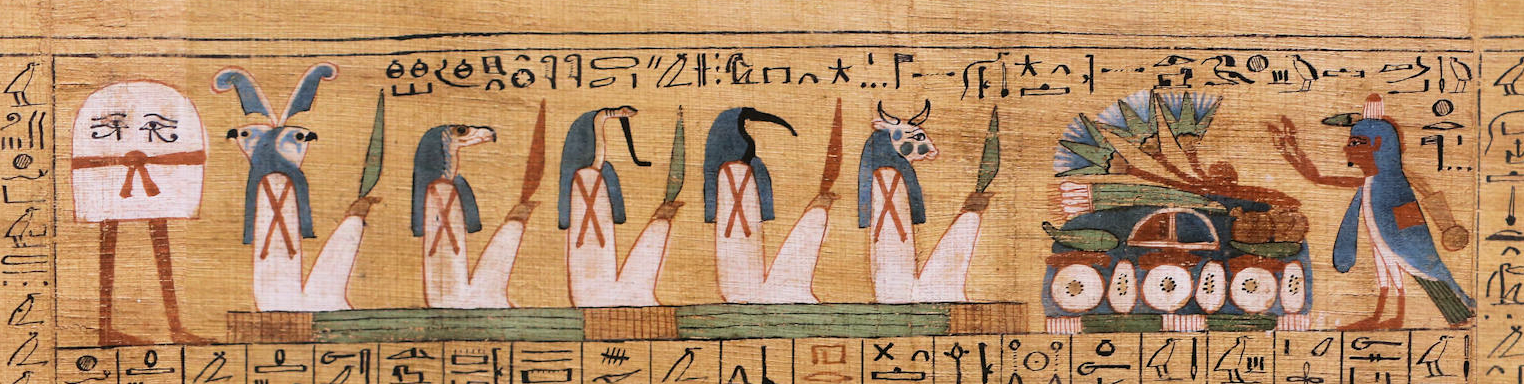
A vignette from the Papyrus Cairo JE 95658 scroll. Medjed is shown on the far left.

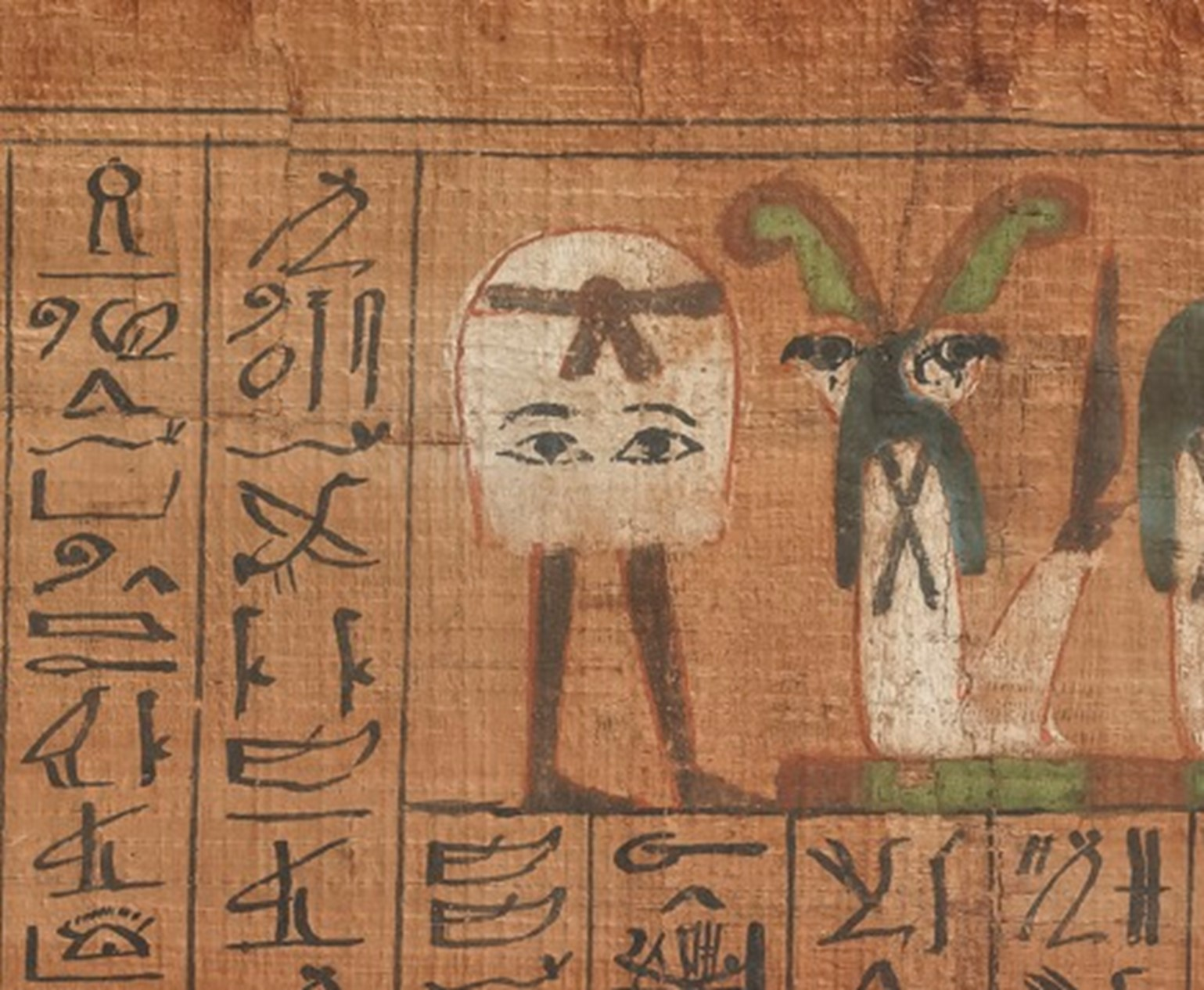
A detail taken from the Papyrus Bodmer 100 scroll. Medjed is the figure at centre.

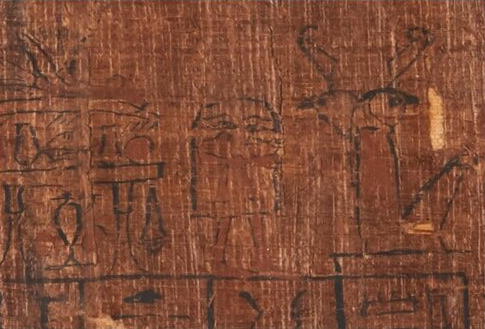
A detail taken from the Papyrus Bodmer 101 scroll. Medjed is the figure at centre.

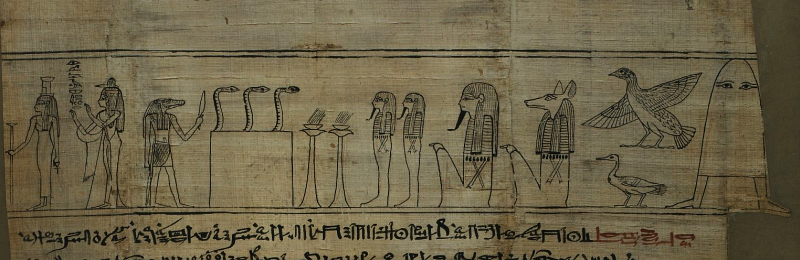
A vignette from the Greenfield papyrus, sheet 12. Medjed is depicted on far-right, with feet facing both directions.

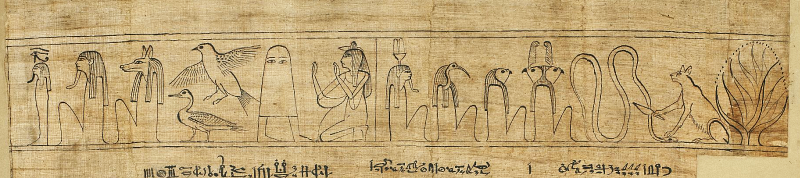
A vignette from the Greenfield papyrus, sheet 76. Medjed is depicted on centre-left, with both feet facing right.

A depiction of Medjed based on the Greenfield papyrus.

== See also ==
- Media related to Medjed at Wikimedia Commons
- Medjed (fish), also worshipped in ancient Egyptian religion
