= Kamose =

Final Pharaoh of Theban seventeenth dynasty of Egypt

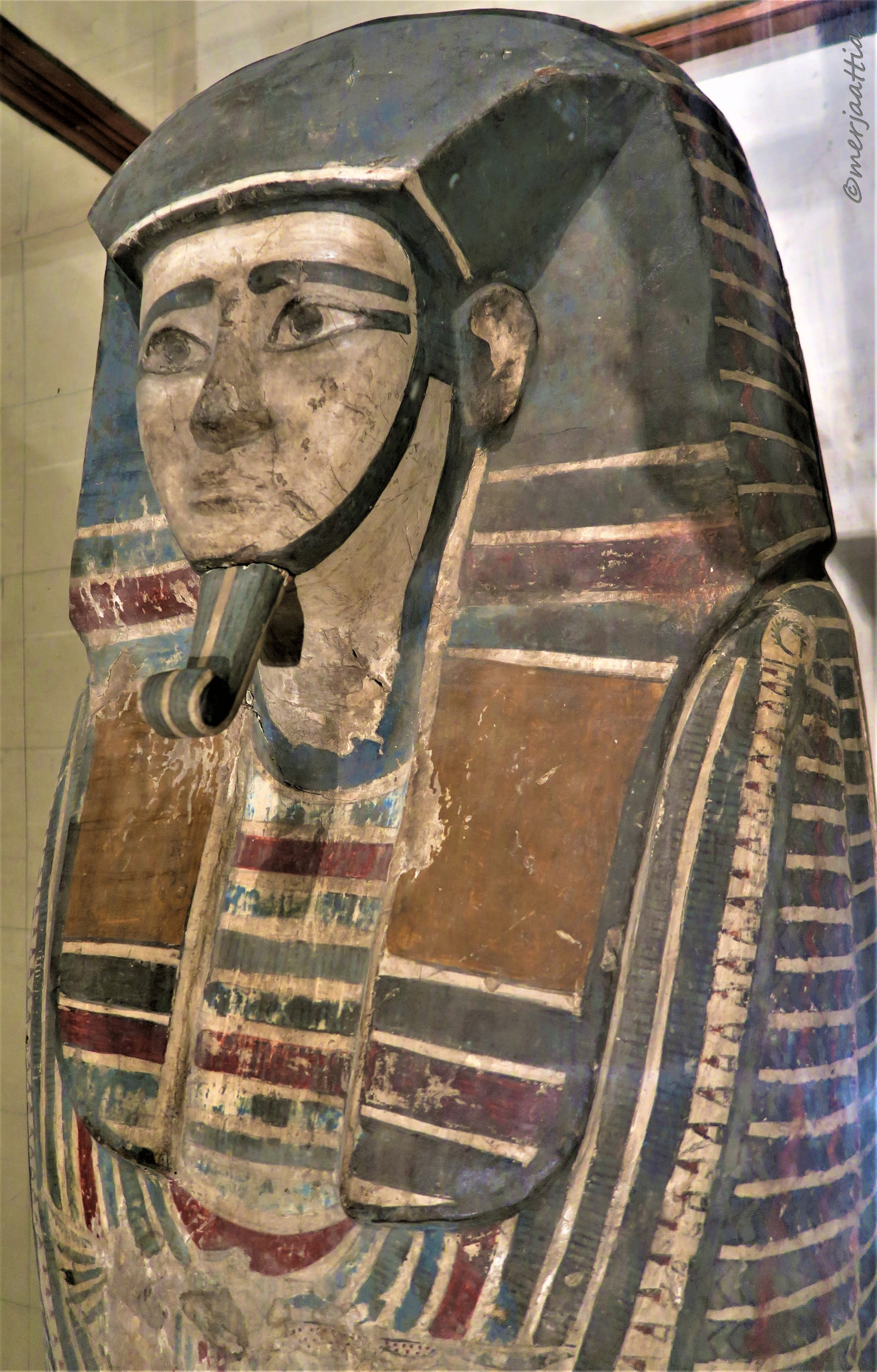
- Rishi coffin of Kamose, Cairo Egyptian Museum

Pharaoh
- Reign: c. 1555 - 1550 BC
- Predecessor: Seqenenre Tao
- Successor: Ahmose I
Royal titulary
Horus name
Khahernesetef
Ḫˁj-ḥr-nst=f
He who appears on his throne
G5	N28 D36 D2 Z1 W11 t f
Sedjefatawy
Sḏf3-t3wj
He who nourishes the two lands
G5	s D f D40 N16 N16
Neferkhabtawi
Nfr-ẖ3b-t3wj
The perfect horus who tames the two lands
G5	F35 K4 G1 D58 N11 N17 N17
Nebty name
Wehem-menu
Wḥm-mnw
He who renews the fortifications
G16	F25 Y5 N35 W24 W24 W24
Golden Horus
Bik Nebu Seheru-Tawi
bjk nbw shrw-t3wj
The Golden Falcon who satisfies the two lands
G8	S29 O4 D21 Y1 N17 N17 N23 N23
Prenomen
Wadjkheperre
W3ḏ-ḫpr-Rˁ
Flourishing is the Manifestation of Re

M23 X1 L2 X1	N5 M13 M40 L1
Nomen
Kamose
Kȝ ms(=w)
He who is born of the bull

G39 N5	D28 D52 F31 s A24
- Consort: Ahhotep II (?)
- Children: Ahmose-Sitkamose (?)
- Father: Seqenenre Tao
- Mother: Ahhotep I?
- Died: 1550 BC
- Burial: Dra' Abu el-Naga'
- Dynasty: 17th Dynasty

Kamose was the last king of the Theban Seventeenth Dynasty at the end of the Second Intermediate Period. Kamose is usually ascribed a reign of three years (his highest attested regnal year), although some scholars now favor giving him a longer reign of approximately five years. His prenomen or royal name was 'Wadjkheperre.'

He was the son of Seqenenre Tao and the brother of Ahmose I, founder of the Eighteenth Dynasty. His mother is unknown, but is thought to be Ahhotep I. His reign is important for the decisive military initiatives he took against the Hyksos, who had come to rule much of Ancient Egypt. His father had begun the initiatives and lost his life in battle with the Hyksos. It is thought that his mother, as regent, continued the campaigns after the death of Kamose, and that his full brother made the final conquest of them and united all of Egypt.

== Campaigns ==
=== Casus Belli ===
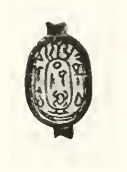
Drawing of a scarab of Kamose by Flinders Petrie.

Kamose was the final king in a succession of native Egyptian kings at Thebes. Originally, the Theban Seventeenth dynasty rulers were at peace with the Hyksos kingdom to their north prior to the reign of Seqenenre Tao. They controlled Upper Egypt up to Elephantine and ruled Middle Egypt as far north as Cusae. Kamose sought to extend his rule northward over all of Lower Egypt. This apparently was met with much opposition by his courtiers. It appears that at some point, these princes in Thebes had achieved a practical modus vivendi with the later Hyksos rulers, which included transit rights through Hyksos-controlled Middle and Lower Egypt and pasturage rights in the fertile Delta. Kamose's records on the Carnarvon Tablet (in the text also parallelled in the Thebes stelae of Kamose) relate the misgivings of this king's council to the prospect of a war against the Hyksos:

See, all are loyal as far as Cusae. We are tranquil in our part of Egypt. Elephantine [at the First Cataract] is strong, and the middle part (of the land) is with us as far as Cusae. Men till for us the finest of their lands. Our cattle pasture in the Papyrus marshes. Corn is sent for our swine. Our cattle are not taken away... He holds the land of the Asiatics; we hold Egypt..."

However, Kamose's presentation here may be propaganda designed to embellish his reputation since his predecessor, Seqenenre Tao, had already been engaged in conflict with the Hyksos (for unknown reasons), only to fall in battle. Kamose sought to regain by force what he thought was his by right, namely the kingship of Lower and Upper Egypt. The king thus responds to his council:

I should like to know what serves this strength of mine, when a chieftain in Avaris, and another in Kush, and I sit united with an Asiatic and a Nubian, each in possession of his slice of Egypt, and I cannot pass by him as far as Memphis... No man can settle down, when despoiled by the taxes of the Asiatics. I will grapple with him, that I may rip open his belly! My wish is to save Egypt and to smite the Asiatic!"

There is no evidence to support Pierre Montet's assertion that Kamose's move against the Hyksos was sponsored by the priesthood of Amun as an attack against the Seth-worshippers in the north (i.e., a religious motive for the war of liberation). The Carnarvon Tablet does state that Kamose went north to attack the Hyksos by the command of Amun, but this is common to virtually all royal inscriptions of Egyptian history, and should not be understood as the specific command from this deity. Kamose states his reasons for an attack on the Hyksos was nationalistic pride.

=== Northern Campaign ===
In Kamose's third year, he embarked on his military campaign against the Hyksos by sailing north out of Thebes on the Nile. He first reached Nefrusy, which was just north of Cusae and was manned by an Egyptian garrison loyal to the Hyksos. A detachment of Medjay troops attacked the garrison and overran it. The Carnarvon Tablet recounted this much of the campaign, but breaks off there. Nonetheless, Kamose's military strategy probably can be inferred. As Kamose moved north, he could easily take small villages and wipe out small Hyksos garrisons, but if a city resisted, he could cut it off from the rest of the Hyksos kingdom simply by taking over the city directly to the north. This kind of tactic probably allowed him to travel very quickly up the Nile. The second stele of Kamose (found in Thebes) continues Kamose's narrative with an attack on Avaris. Because it does not mention Memphis or other major cities to the north, it has long been suspected that Kamose never did attack Avaris, but instead recorded what he intended to do. Kim Ryholt recently has argued that Kamose probably never advanced farther than the Anpu or Cynopolis Nome in Middle Egypt (around the Faiyum and the city of Saka) and did not enter either the Nile Delta, nor Lower Egypt proper.

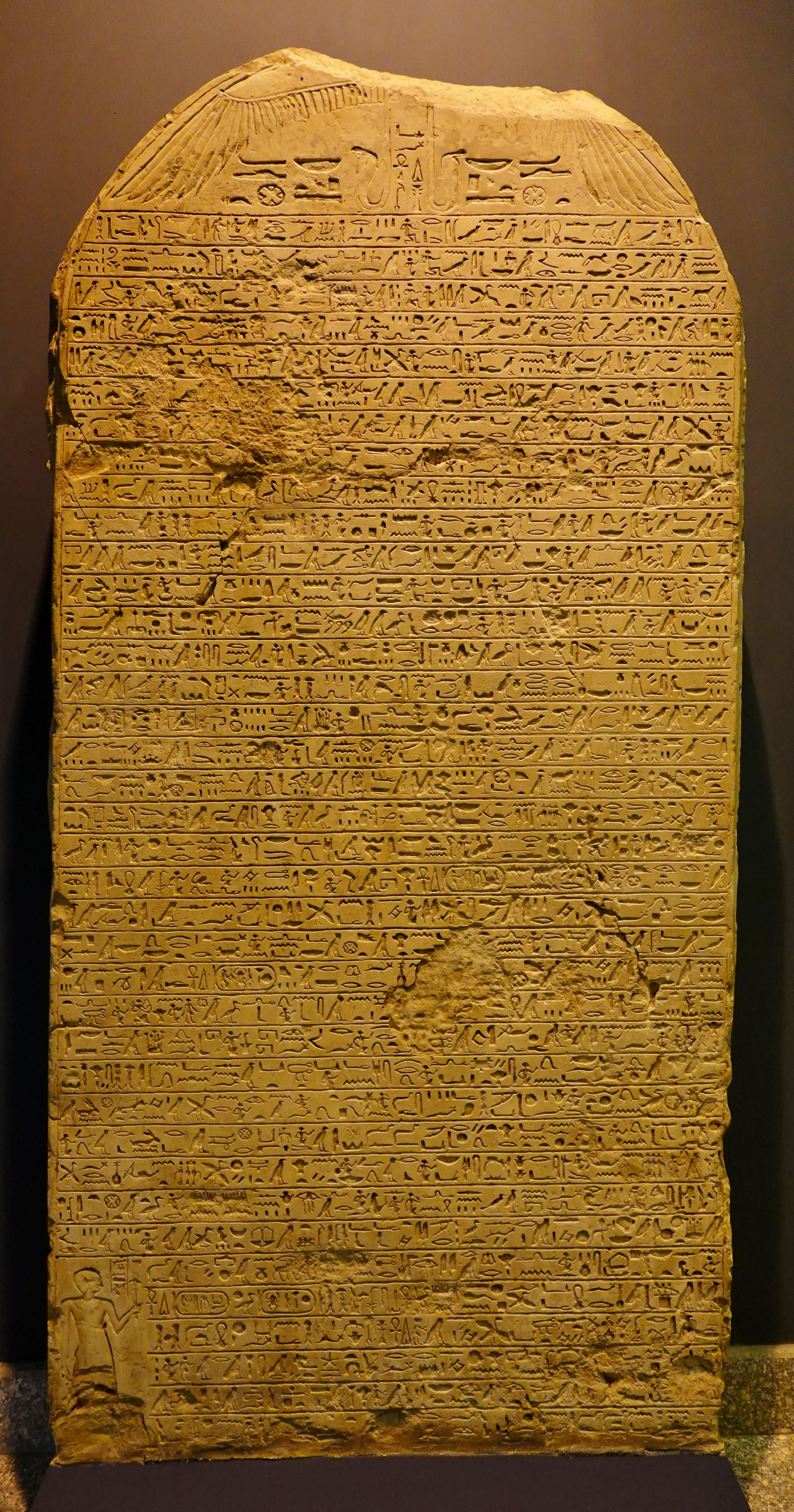
Kamose's second stela which records his victory against the Hyksos (Luxor Museum).

According to the second stele, after moving north of Nefrusy, Kamose's soldiers captured a courier bearing a message from the Hyksos king Awoserre Apopi at Avaris to his ally, the ruler of Kush, requesting the latter's urgent support against Kamose. Kamose promptly ordered a detachment of his troops to occupy and destroy the Bahariya Oasis in the western desert, which controlled the north–south desert route. Kamose, called "the Strong" in this text, ordered this action to protect his rearguard. Kamose then sailed southward, back up the Nile to Thebes, for a joyous victory celebration after his military success against the Hyksos in pushing the boundaries of his kingdom northward from Cusae past Hermopolis through to Sako, which now formed the new frontier between the seventeenth dynasty of Thebes and the fifteenth dynasty Hyksos state.

Ryholt notes that Kamose never claims in his second stela to attack anything in Avaris itself, only "anything belonging to Avaris (nkt hwt-w'rt, direct genitive) i.e., the spoil [of war] which his army has carried off" as lines 7–8 and 15 of Kamose's stela—the only references to Avaris here—demonstrate:

Line 7–8: I placed the brave guard-flotilla to patrol as far as the desert-edge with the remainder (of the fleet) behind it, as if a kite were preying upon the territory of Avaris.

Line 15: I have not overlooked anything belonging to Avaris, because it (the area which Kamose was plundering) is empty.

The Second Stela of Kamose is well known for recounting that a Hyksos messenger was captured with a letter from Apophis—appealing for aid from the king of Kush against Kamose—while travelling through the western desert roads to Nubia. The final evidence that this king's military activities affected only the Cynopolite nome, and not the city of Avaris itself, is the fact that when Kamose returned the letter to Apophis, he dispatched it to Atfih which is about a hundred miles south of Avaris. Atfih, hence, formed either the new border or a no-man's land between the now shrunken Hyksos kingdom and Kamose's expanding seventeenth dynasty state. Furthermore, Kamose states in his second stele that his intention in returning the letter was for the Hyksos messenger to inform Apophis of the Theban king's victories "in the area of Cynopolis which used to be in his possession." This information confirms that Kamose confined his activities to this Egyptian nome and never approached the city of Avaris itself in his Year 3.

=== First Nubian Campaign ===
Kamose is known to have campaigned against the Kushites prior to his third year since the Hyksos king directly appeals to his Kushite counterpart to attack his Theban rival and avenge the damage which Kamose had inflicted upon both their states. It is unlikely that Kamose had the resources to simultaneously defeat the Kushites to the south and then inflict a serious setback on the Hyksos to the north in just one year over a front-line that extended over several hundred kilometres.

== Length of reign ==
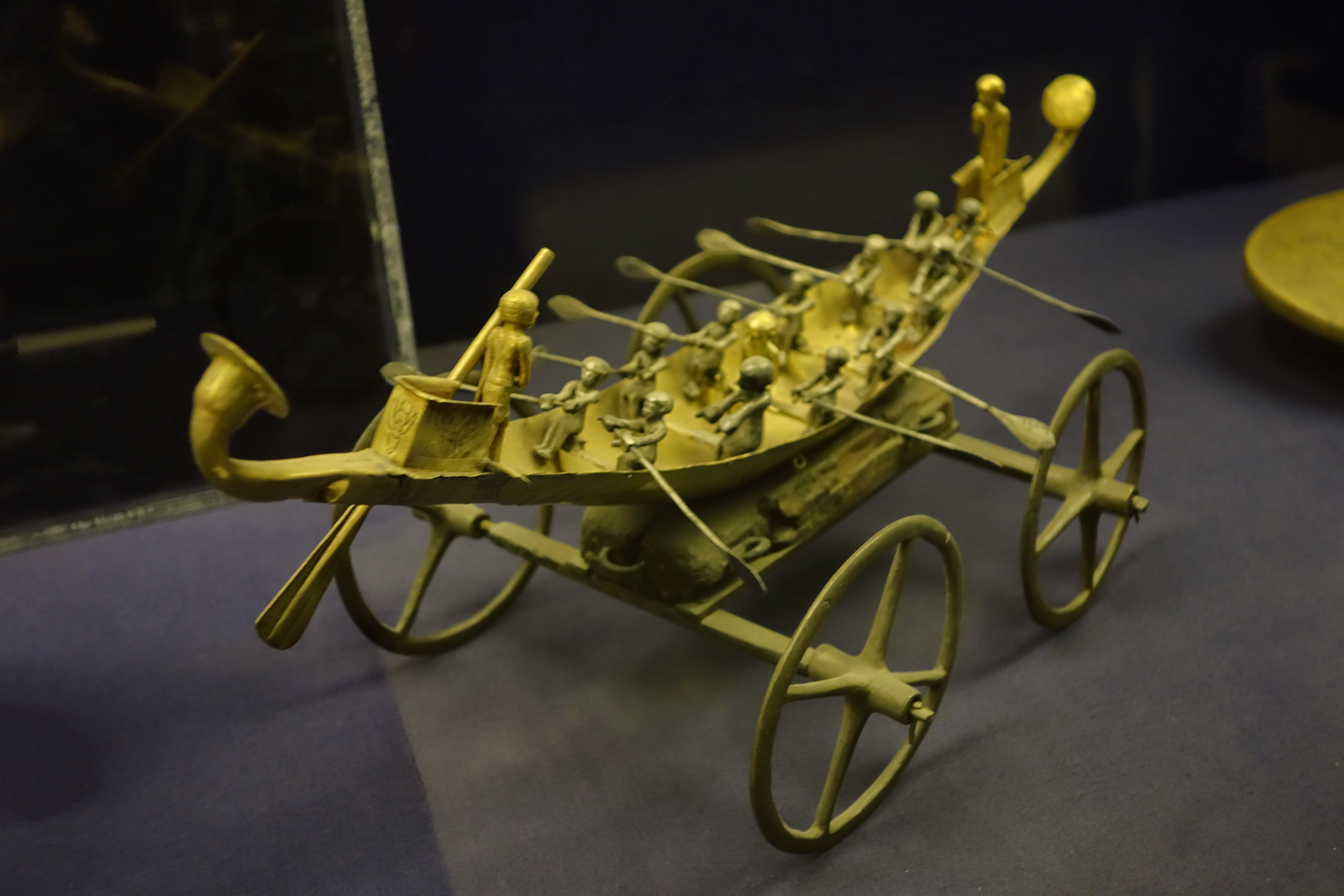
A votive gold barque boat model attributed to Kamose and found in his Chief Queen Ahhotep II's tomb at Dra' Abu el-Naga'.

His Year 3 is the only attested date for Kamose and was once thought to signal the end of his reign. However, it now appears certain that Kamose reigned for one or two more years beyond this date because he initiated a second campaign against the Nubians. Evidence that Kamose had started a first campaign against the Kushites is affirmed by the contents of Apophis' captured letter where the Hyksos king's plea for aid from the king of Kush is recounted in Kamose's Year 3 Second stela:

Do you see what Egypt has done to me? The ruler who is in it, Kamose-the-Brave, given life, is attacking me on my soil although I have not attacked him in the manner of all he has done against you. He is choosing these two lands to bring affliction upon them, my land and yours, and he has ravaged them."

Two separate rock-inscriptions found at Arminna and Toshka, deep in Nubia, give the prenomen and nomen of Kamose and Ahmose side by side and were inscribed at the same time—likely by the same draughtsman—according to the epigraphic data. In both inscriptions "the names of Ahmose follow directly below those of Kamose and each king is given the epithet di-ˁnḫ, Given Life, which was normally used only of ruling kings. This indicates that both Kamose and Ahmose were ruling when the inscriptions were cut and consequently that they were coregents. Since Kamose's name was recorded first, he would have been the senior coregent. However, no mention or reference to Ahmose as king appears in Kamose's Year 3 stela which indirectly records Kamose's first campaign against the Nubians; this can only mean that Kamose appointed the young Ahmose as his junior coregent sometime after his third year prior to launching a second military campaign against the Nubians. As a result, Kamose's second Nubian campaign must have occurred in his Year 4 or 5. The target of Kamose's second Nubian campaign may have been the fortress at Buhen which the Nubians had recaptured from Kamose's forces since a stela bearing his cartouche was deliberately erased and there is fire damage in the fort itself.

A slightly longer reign of five years for Kamose has now been estimated by Ryholt and this ruler's timeline has been dated from 1554 BC to 1549 BC to take into account a one year period of coregency between Ahmose and Kamose. Donald Redford notes that Kamose was buried very modestly, in an ungilded stock coffin which lacked even a royal uraeus. This may imply that the king died before he had enough time to complete his burial equipment presumably because he was engaged in warfare with his Kushite and Hyksos neighbours.

== Mummy ==
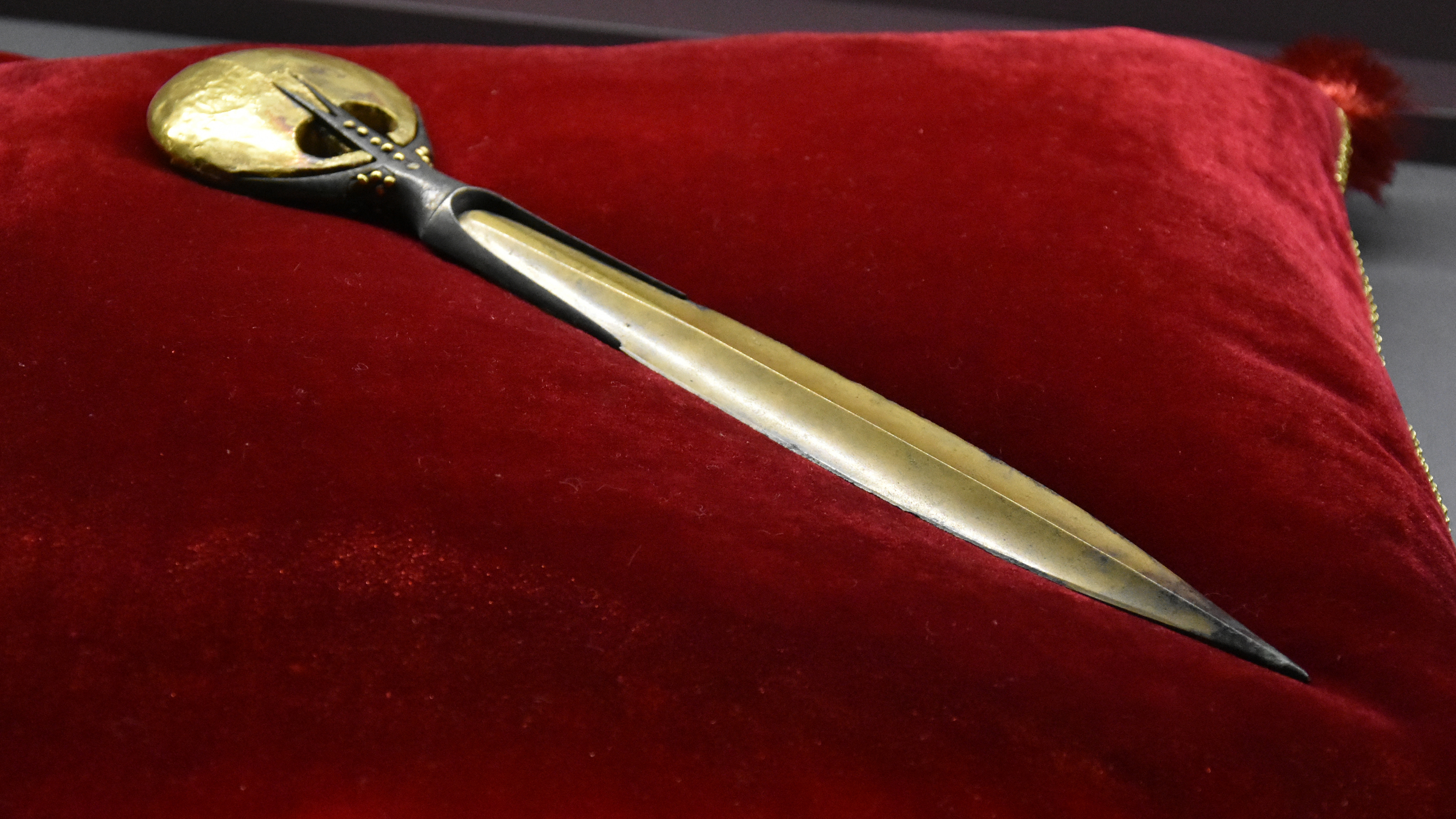
Ceremonial 23 cm long Wood, Copper and Gold Dagger of Kamose in the Royal Library of Brussels.

The tomb of Kamose is mentioned in the Abbott Papyrus, which records an investigation into tomb robberies during the reign of Ramesses IX, about 400 years after Kamose's interment. While his tomb was mentioned as being "in a good state", it is clear that his mummy was moved at some point afterward, as it was discovered in 1857 at Dra' Abu el-Naga', seemingly deliberately hidden in a pile of debris. The painted and stuccoed Rishi coffin was uncovered by early Egyptologists Auguste Mariette and Heinrich Brugsch, who noted that the mummy was in very poor shape. Buried with the mummy was a gold and silver dagger, amulets, a scarab, a bronze mirror, and a pectoral in the shape of a cartouche bearing the name of his successor and brother, Ahmose.

The coffin remains in Egypt, while the dagger is in Brussels and the pectoral and mirror are in the Louvre, Paris. The name of the pharaoh inscribed on the coffin was only recognized fifty years after the original discovery, by which time the mummy, which had been left with the pile of debris on which it was found in Dra' Abu el-Naga, was almost certainly long lost.

== Stelae ==
Kamose erected two stelae in Thebes that seem to tell a consecutive narrative of his defeat of the Hyksos. The first stele is missing its last part.

The Carnarvon Tablet also preserves some of the text of the stelae.

=== Identification ===
As early as 1916, Sir Alan Gardiner assumed that the First Carnarvon Tablet must be a copy of some commemorative stela of pharaoh Kamose. This was later confirmed when French Egyptologists Lacau and Chévrier were working in Karnak, and made an important discovery of two stela fragments. The smallest of them was found in 1932. And in 1935, the larger fragment appeared. Thus, it emerged that the Carnarvon Tablet text was copied from Kamose's stelas. These newer texts were published in 1939.

=== Other discoveries ===
More recently, some other inscriptions of Kamose were found.

"Only two stelae of Kamose were known until recently [2016], one of them was also copied to a Dynasty 18 writing table [Carnarvon Tablet] (Redford 1997: nos. 68-69). In 2004 a fragmented inscription with the Two Ladies name of Kamose was found in Karnak and labeled the third stela of Kamose (Van Siclen 2010), and in 2008 a further inscription of Kamose was found in Armant (Thiers 2009)."

== Medieval Arab tradition ==
In the medieval Arab tradition, Kamose is known as Kames (Arabic: قوميس, transliterated as Qūmis). A 10th-century manuscript of anonymous authorship, Akhbar al-Zaman, split him into two different people, one being conflated with the Hyksos ruler Apophis while the other was described as the father of Al-Walid ibn Mus'ab.

== Bibliography ==
- Roxana Flammini, “Disputed Rulership in Upper Egypt: Reconsidering the Second Stela of Kamose (K2) (pp.55-75)" in The Journal of the Society for the Study of Egyptian Antiquities 38 (2011-2012), Toronto Canada
- Roxana Flammini, "La Segunda Estela de Kamose: Un estudio integral en contexto (The Second Stela of Kamose: A Comprehensive Study in Context)", Ancient Near East Monographs, Society of Biblical Literature (SBL Press) Atlanta 2025
- Gardiner, Sir Alan. Egypt of the Pharaohs. Oxford: University Press, 1964, 1961.
- Montet, Pierre. Eternal Egypt, translated from the French by Doreen Weightman. London, 1964
- Pritchard, James B. (Editor). Ancient Near Eastern Texts Relating to the Old Testament (3rd edition). Princeton, 1969.
- Redford, Donald B. History and Chronology of the Eighteenth Dynasty of Egypt: Seven Studies. Toronto, 1967.
- Ryholt, Kim SB, The Political Situation in Egypt during the Second Intermediate Period (Carsten Niebuhr Institute Publications, Copenhagen, (Museum Tusculanum Press:1997) ISBN 87-7289-421-0
- Simpson, William Kelly (Editor). The Literature of Ancient Egypt: An Anthology of Stories, Instructions, Stelae, Autobiographies, and Poetry (3rd edition). New Haven, 2003, pp. 345–50 (translation of the Kamose texts).

Preceded by Seqenenre Tao	Pharaoh of Egypt; Seventeenth Dynasty	Succeeded by Ahmose I
