= Nesitanebetashru =

Name of two ancient Egyptian women

n ns z Z4 Y1 t A nb t i S r rw n n n Z92
Nesitanebetashru
in hieroglyphs
Era: 3rd Intermediate Period
(1069–664 BC)

Nesitanebetashru (n.sj-tꜣ-nb.t-jšrw) was the name of two ancient Egyptian women. The name means "belonging to the lady of the ashru"; the ashru or isheru was a crescent-shaped sacred lake around the temples of solar goddesses, here it refers to Mut.

== 21st Dynasty ==
Nesitanebetashru of the 21st dynasty was a daughter of Pinedjem II, High Priest of Amun, and Neskhons. She is mentioned in the funerary text of her mother, written on a wooden tablet. Her mummy, coffins and ushabtis were found in the tomb TT320 and are now in the Egyptian Museum in Cairo.

Her funeral text, known as the Greenfield papyrus, is one of the longest on record. It is held in the collections of the British Museum.

== 22nd Dynasty ==
Nesitanebetashru of the 22nd dynasty was the wife of High Priest of Amun, Shoshenq and the mother of Pharaoh Harsiese A. She was also a Chantress of Amun. She is mentioned on a statue of Bes. Her husband was previously thought to be identical with Pharaoh Shoshenq II.
