= DHJ =

DHJ can refer to:

- Difaâ Hassani El Jadidi, a Moroccan football club
- Double Holliday Junction, a model of genetic recombination
- Djahy, the Ancient Egyptian exonym for a subregion of the Middle East
- Dhinoj, a train station in India; see List of train stations in India#D
- Dannemora-Harg Railroad, a predecessor of the Upsala-Lenna Jernväg train line in Sweden

== See also ==
- "D. H. J. Polymath", a pseudonym used by the Polymath Project
