= Shekelesh =

Poorly understood ancient Mediterranean group

The Shekelesh (Egyptian language: šꜣkrwšꜣꜣ or šꜣꜣkrwšꜣꜣ) were one of the several ethnic groups the Sea Peoples were said to be composed of, appearing in fragmentary historical and iconographic records in ancient Egyptian from the Eastern Mediterranean in the late 2nd millennium BC.

== Earliest records ==
The Shekelesh first appears in Egyptian records during accounts of the pharaoh Merneptah's military campaigns in modern Libya in the closing years of the 13th century BC, as recounted on the Great Karnak Inscription. In the text, the Shekelesh, alongside other clans of the Sea Peoples, are described as auxiliary troops of the Libyan ruler Meryey, and Merneptah recounts he killed between 200 and 222 of them.

Nearly thirty years later, the Shekelesh are mentioned within the exploits of Ramesses III, where they, along with the Peleset, Tjeker, Denyen, and Weshesh, are described as forming a foothold in the Amurru kingdom during the 8th year of his reign. Ramesses, per his inscriptions, vanquished the coalition, and portrays himself leading a glorious procession of captured Sea Peoples as prisoners.

== Origins ==
In 1867, Egyptologist and philologist Emmanuel de Rougé identified the Shekelesh as coming from Sicily, given the phonetic similarities of the two names. Joining him was fellow Egyptologist François Chabas, in 1872. The following year, the identification was disputed by Gaston Maspero, who believed the Shekelesh were Anatolian in origin, instead opting to identify them with the ancient city of Sagalassos.

In 1928, Eduard Meyer proposed an identification with the Sicels, who are known to have inhabited Sicily during the Sea Peoples' conquests, although the Sicals are often identified with the Tjeker, another group of the Sea Peoples. Today, it is still uncertain where the Shekelesh originated from, and if they indeed embarked from Sicily, it is similarly debated whether or not Sicily was their original homeland, or if they were originally settlers which came from some other location.

The Shekelesh have also been identified with the Sikalayu (Hittite: 𒅆𒅗𒆷𒅀𒌋 ši-ka-la-ia/u-u) mentioned by the Hittite king Šuppiluliuma II in a letter to the governor of Ugarit. Per Šuppiluliuma, the Sikalayu were ones "who dwell/live on ships", and, given his wordage, seemed to be largely a mystery to the Hittites. Given their association with ships, these scholars conclude the Sikalayu were a pirate group who hailed from a place, presumably an island, known as Sikala.
