= Philistine Bichrome ware =

Archaeological term

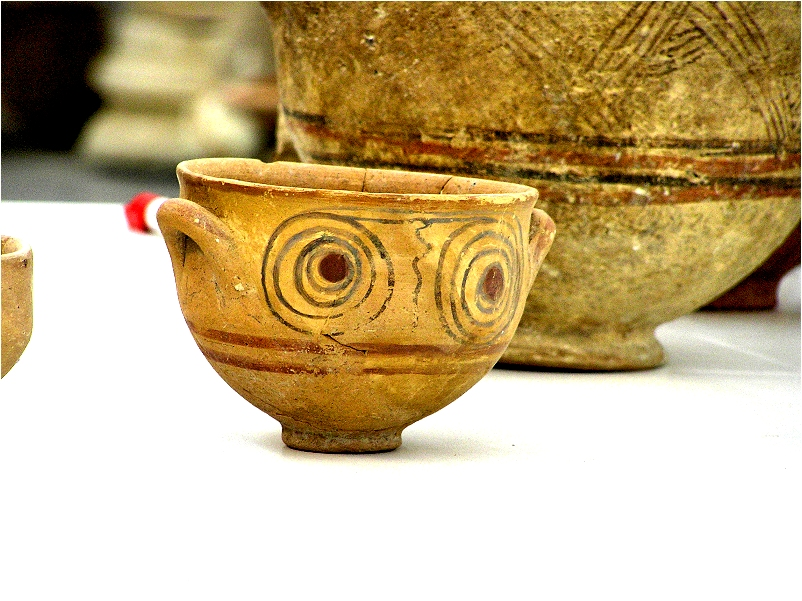
Philistine Bichrome pottery

Philistine Bichrome ware is an archaeological term coined by William F. Albright in 1924 which describes pottery production in a general region associated with the Philistine settlements during the Iron Age I period in ancient Canaan (ca. 1200–1000 BCE). The connection of the pottery type to the "Philistines" is still held by many scholars, although some question its methodological validity.

Scholars have sought to connect Philistine Bichrome ware with imported Mycenaean pottery from Cyprus, and local Canaanite monochrome ware.

== Classification ==
Philistine Bichrome ware is believed to be the direct descendant of imported MYCIIIC:1b pottery (MYC = Mycenaean), which was manufactured in Cyprus and imported to ancient Canaan, and locally made MYCIIIC:1b or monochrome ware, which was manufactured at settlements in Canaan.

MYCIIIC:1b or monochrome ware was found in high-distribution during the Iron IA period (1200–1140/30 BCE) at the Philistine settlements of Ashdod (Stratum XIIIb: Area G; in general, Stratum XIII: Area H) and Ekron (Tel Miqne: Stratum VII). MYCIIIC:1b was also found in smaller quantities at Acre, Beit She'an, and along the coast of Lebanon and Syria.

== Neutron analysis ==
Neutron analysis of Philistine Bichrome ware has found that it may have been made in the same workshop, locally in Canaan, as its predecessor, MYCIIIC:1b. It first appears in the mid-12th Century BCE, during Iron IB (1140/30–1000/980 BCE) at sites such as Ashdod (Stratum XII), Megiddo (Stratum VIB). It was mainly confined to the Philistine settlements with some distribution throughout ancient Canaan.

== Style ==
Stylistic features include the use of decoration with red and black paints (thus bichrome) on a white slip with common Mycenaean motifs of birds, fish, and sailing vessels. While the shape of the pottery retains its Mycenaean roots, Cypriot influence is seen by the use of tall and narrow necks. Stylistic representations of birds in the Mycenaean style which are found on bichrome ware were considered to be sacred and are also featured on the Philistine ships in the reliefs from Medinet Habu in Thebes, Egypt. This is the mortuary temple of Ramesses III of the Twentieth Dynasty of Egypt, and it depicts a battle with the Sea Peoples in the eighth year of his reign known as the Battle of the Delta ca. 1175 BCE (alternative date of 1178 BCE).

This form of pottery lasted until ca. 1000 BCE.

Philistine Bichrome ware is related to Cypriot Bichrome ware. 'Bichrome Red ware' from Cyprus is also relevant.

== See also ==
Chocolate-on-white ware

== Bibliography ==
- E. Oren (ed). The Sea People and Their World: A Reassessment. University of Pennsylvania: Philadelphia, 2000.
- A. Mazar. Archaeology of the Land of the Bible: 10,000 – 586 BCE. Doubleday: New York, 1992.
- T. Levy (ed). The Archaeology of Society in the Holy Land. Facts on File: New York, 1995.
