= Battle of the Delta =

River battle in the Nile Delta between the Egyptians and the Sea Peoples

Battle of the Nile Delta
- Part of the Egyptian–Sea Peoples wars of the Late Bronze Age collapse
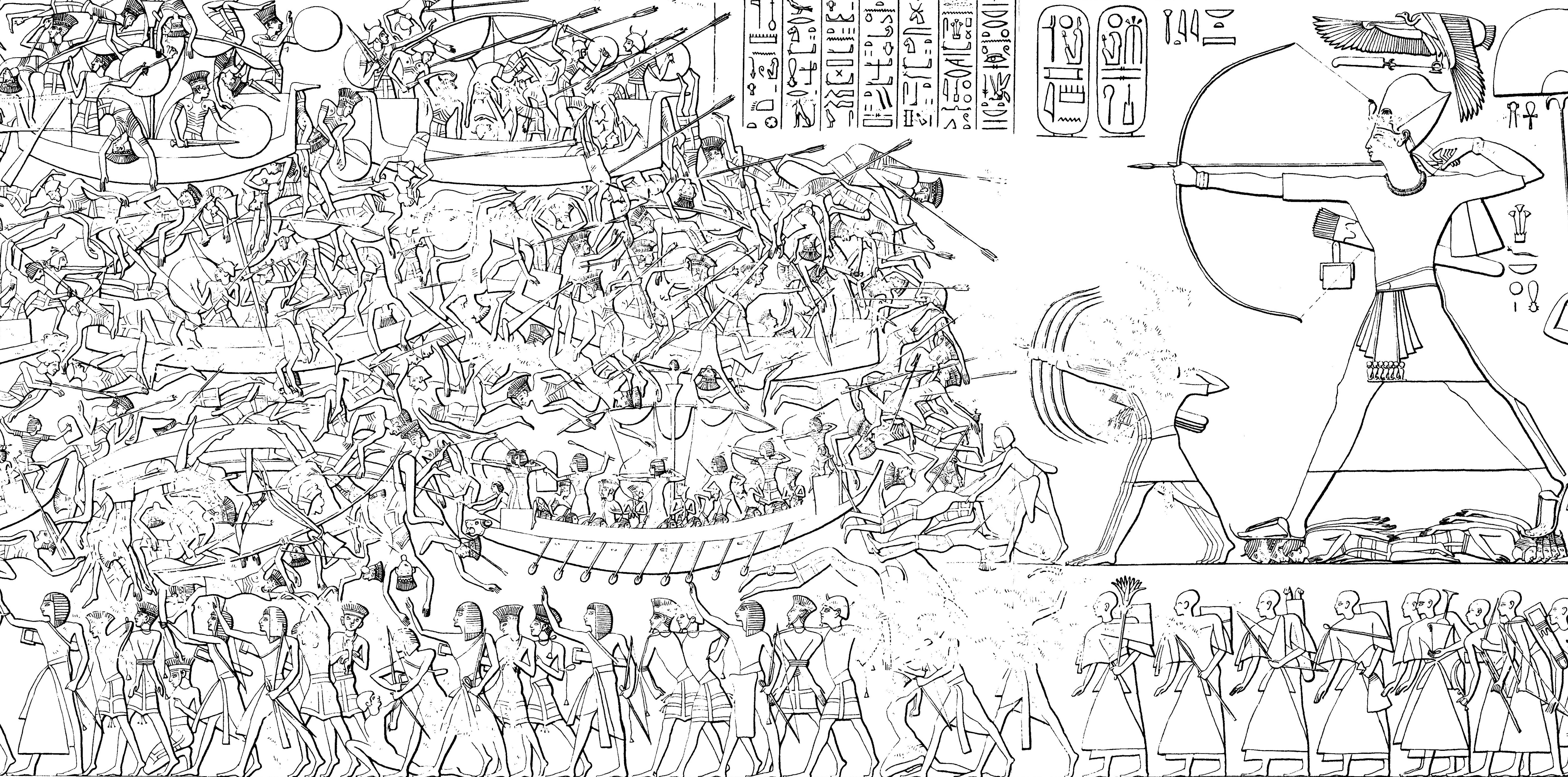
- Sea Peoples in their ships during the battle with the Egyptians. Relief from the mortuary temple of Ramesses III at Medinet Habu.
Date	Between 1179 and 1175 BC
Location	Eastern Nile Delta
Result	Egyptian victory

Belligerents
New Kingdom of Egypt	Sea Peoples

Commanders and leaders
Ramesses III	Unknown

Strength
Unknown	Unknown

Casualties and losses
Unknown	Many killed and captured

The Battle of the Delta was a sea battle between Egypt and the Sea Peoples, circa 1175 BC, when the Egyptian pharaoh Ramesses III repelled a major sea invasion. The conflict occurred on the shores of the eastern Nile Delta and on the border of the Egyptian Empire in Syria, although precise locations of the battles are unknown. This major conflict is recorded on the temple walls of the mortuary temple of pharaoh Ramesses III at Medinet Habu.

== Historical background ==
In the 12th century BC, the Sea Peoples (which consisted of several groups, such as Tjekker, Peleset, and Sherden) invaded the Middle East from the eastern Mediterranean Sea. They attacked Syria and the Southern Levant, where many cities were burned and ruined. (Carchemish was one of the cities which survived the Sea People's attacks.) Cyprus had also been overwhelmed and its capital sacked. Since the Medinet Habu inscriptions depict women and children loaded in ox carts, the attackers are believed to have been migrants looking for a place to settle. Their attacks are reported, for instance, in letters by Ammurapi, the last king of Ugarit, pleading for assistance from Eshuwara, the king of Alasiya:

My father [Eshuwara], behold, the enemy's ships came (here); my cities(?) were burned, and they did evil things in my country. Does not my father know that all my troops and chariots(?) are in the Land of Hatti, and all my ships are in the Land of Lukka? ...Thus, the country is abandoned to itself. May my father know it: the seven ships of the enemy that came here inflicted much damage upon us.

The Sea People invasions are often listed among the causes or symptoms of the Bronze Age collapse. Ramesses had fought the Sea Peoples in southern Lebanon at the Battle of Djahy. Ramesses III describes a great movement of peoples in the East from the Mediterranean, which caused massive destruction of the former great powers of the Levant, Cyprus and Anatolia:

the lands were removed and scattered to the fray. No land could stand before their arms, from Hatti, Kode, Carchemish, Arzawa, Alashiya on being cut off. [ie: cut down]"

== Battle ==
After defeating the Sea Peoples on land in Syria, Ramesses rushed back to Egypt where preparations for the invaders' assault had already been completed. Ramesses enticed the Sea Peoples and their ships into the mouth of the Nile, where he had assembled his fleet for an ambush. Ramesses also lined the shores of the Nile Delta with ranks of archers who were ready to release volleys of arrows into the enemy ships if they attempted to land. Once within range, Ramesses ordered the archers to fire at the enemy ships, pushing them back towards his fleet, now coming in to cut off the Sea Peoples' escape route. This Egyptian fleet pushed the Sea Peoples' boats towards shore. Then archers and infantrymen both on land and on the ships devastated the enemy. The Sea People's ships were overturned, many were killed and captured and some were even dragged to the shore, where they were killed. In the inscriptions, Ramesses proclaims:

Those who reached my boundary, their seed is not; their hearts and their souls are finished forever and ever. As for those who had assembled before them on the sea, the full flame was their front before the harbour mouths, and a wall of metal upon the shore surrounded them. They were dragged, overturned, and laid low upon the beach; slain and made heaps from stern to bow of their galleys, while all their things were cast upon the water.

== Aftermath ==
The victory at the Delta saved Egypt from the destruction that befell Hatti, Alasiya and other great Near Eastern powers.

There is no documentation for any pursuit of the defeated Sea Peoples. Although defeated in the Delta, some of the Sea Peoples (specifically the Peleset) are believed to have settled in the Southern Levant some time after Ramesses' death.

== See also ==
- 1177 B.C.: The Year Civilization Collapsed
