= Sea Peoples =

Purported ancient tribal confederation of the Late Bronze Age

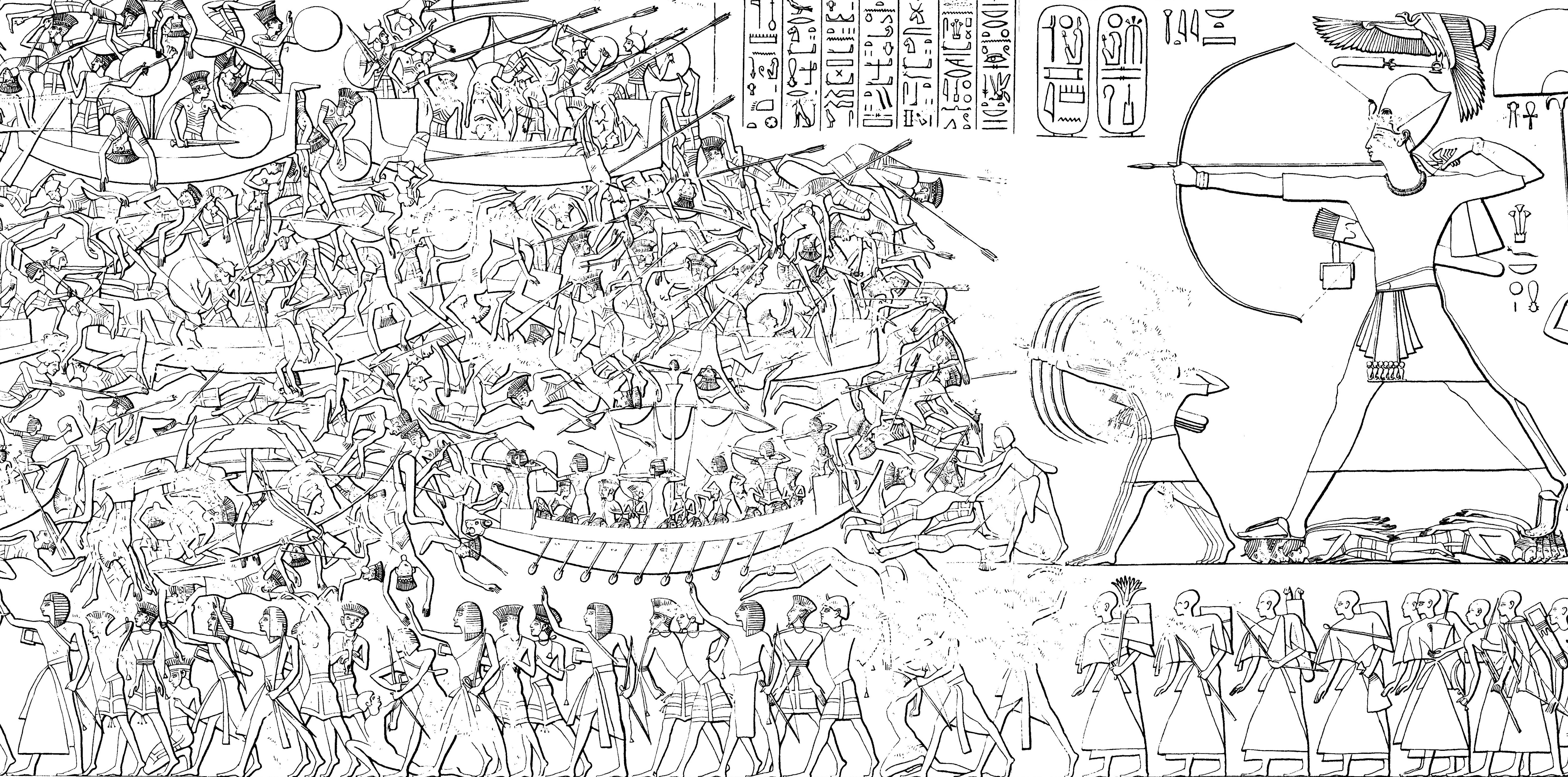
This scene from the north wall of Medinet Habu is often used to illustrate the Egyptian campaign against the Sea Peoples, in what has come to be known as the Battle of the Delta (c. 1175 BC), during the reign of Ramesses III. While accompanying hieroglyphs do not name Egypt's enemies, describing them simply as being from "northern countries", early scholars noted the similarities between the hairstyles and accessories worn by the combatants and other reliefs in which such groups are named.

The Sea Peoples were a group of tribes who raided Egypt and other Eastern Mediterranean regions around 1200 BC during the Late Bronze Age. They included well-attested groups such as the Lukka and Peleset, as well as others such as the Weshesh whose origins are unknown. The term "Sea People" is a modern coinage, and is often regarded as a misnomer since most of them appear to have travelled by land.

The modern concept of the Sea People originates in the work of the 19th-century Egyptologists Emmanuel de Rougé and Gaston Maspero, who drew on primary texts such as the reliefs on the Mortuary Temple of Ramesses III at Medinet Habu. Subsequent research developed their interpretation further, attempting to link these sources to other Late Bronze Age evidence of migration, piracy, and destruction. In early scholarship, the Sea Peoples were often regarded as a primary cause of the Bronze Age Collapse, but recent work tends to view them as refugees fleeing a crisis which was already in motion.

== History of the concept ==
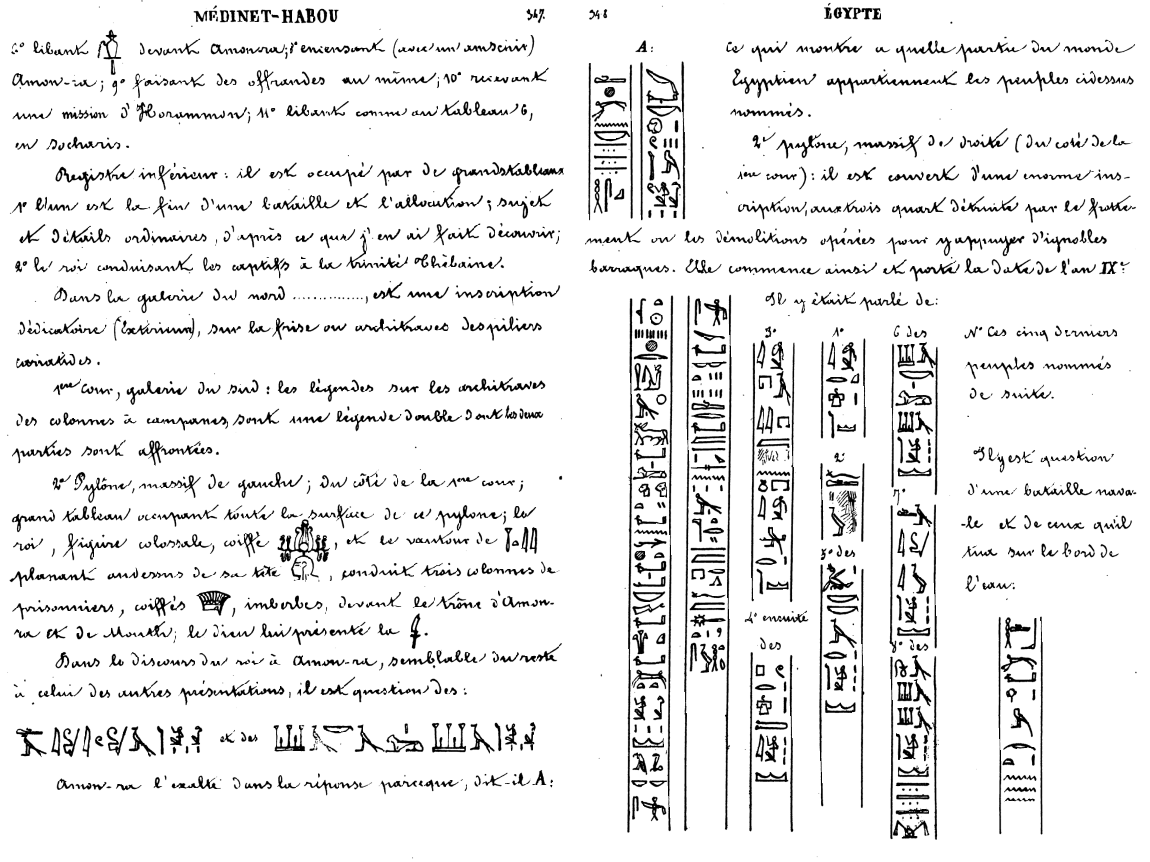
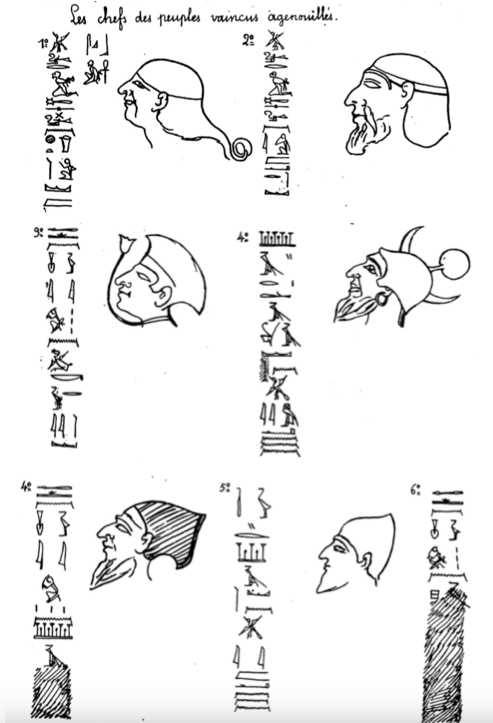
A partial description of the hieroglyphic text at Medinet Habu on the right tower of Second Pylon (left) and an illustration of the prisoners depicted at the base of the Fortified East Gate (right), were first provided by Jean-François Champollion following his 1828–29 travels to Egypt and published posthumously. (Note: See also the sketches provided later in Champollion, Monuments: from the left side of the Second Pylon: Plate CCVIII, and from the base of the right-hand side of the Fortified East Gate Plate CCIII.) Although Champollion did not label them, decades later the hieroglyphs labeled 4 to 8 (left) were translated as Peleset, Tjeker, Shekelesh, Denyen and Weshesh, and the hieroglyphs next to prisoners 3 and 4 (second row, right), translated as Tjeker and Sherden. (Note: Compare with the hieroglyphs provided by Woudhuizen 2006, p. 36.)

The concept of the Sea Peoples was proposed by Emmanuel de Rougé, curator of the Louvre, in his 1855 work Note on Some Hieroglyphic Texts Recently Published by Mr. Greene, as an interpretation of the battles of Ramesses III described on the Second Pylon at Medinet Habu, based upon recent photographs of the temple by John Beasley Greene. (Note: [Translation from the French]: The notices and the 17th letter of Champollion provide a complete and faithful summary of the campaigns of Ramses III (his Ramses Ammon), especially that represented on the north wall, containing the famous bas-relief of a naval battle where the enemy ships are driven to shore by the Egyptian fleet, and simultaneously crushed by the army, which the press on the other side. Champollion recognized that among the enemies of Ramesses, there were a new people, belonging to the white race, and designated as the Tamhou. He copied the first line of the large inscription of the pylon, with a date he specified in the ninth year of the reign, and he noted the importance of this text, which contains several names of people. ... After receiving this just tribute of praise, the King finally begins his speech to the thirteenth line. It recommends to all his subjects to pay attention to his words, and shows their feelings that must lead them in life; then he boasts of his exploits, he brings glory to his father, the god Ammon, who gave him all the conquests. After a column header which unfortunately suffered a lot, is one of the most important parts of our text, in which the king lists the enemies he has overcome, beginning with the Cheta, the Ati, the Karkamasch the Aratou, the Arasa; then, after a short break: at their camp in the country of Amaour, I destroyed the people and their country as if they had never existed We see that these different peoples, common enemies of Egypt in their Asian campaigns before those of Ramses III, are gathered in one group. In the next column, we find a second group formed of people considered by Champollion to have played an important role in the campaign with the naval combat ships; it is the Poursata, the Takkara, the Shakarsha, the Taamou, and Ouaschascha. We see that the only missing Sharetana to this list.) (Note: Greene's documentary photographs are held at the Musee d'Orsay, for example: Médinet-Habou, Temple funéraire de Ramsès III, muraille du nord (5); inventory number: PHO 1986 131 40.) De Rougé noted that "in the crests of the conquered peoples the Sherden and the Teresh bear the designation of the peuples de la mer (Sea Peoples)", in a reference to the prisoners depicted at the base of the Fortified East Gate. (Note: [Translation from the French]: "For a long time Kefa has been identified, with verisimilitude, with Caphthorim of the Bible, to whom Gesenius, along with most interpreters, assigns as a residence the islands of Crete or Cyprus. The people of Cyprus had certainly to take sides in this war; perhaps they were then the allies of Egypt. In any case, our entry does not detail the names of these people, from the islands of the Mediterranean. Champollion noted that T'akkari [which he names Fekkaros; see appendix at the following entry] and Schartana, were recognizable, in enemy ships, with unique hairstyles. In addition, in the crests of the conquered peoples, the Schartana and the Touirasch bear the designation of the peoples of the sea. It is therefore likely that they belong to these nations from islands or coasts of the archipelago. The Rabou are still recognizable among the prisoners.") In 1867, de Rougé published his Excerpts of a dissertation on the attacks directed against Egypt by the peoples of the Mediterranean in the 14th century BC, which focused primarily on the battles of Ramesses II and Merneptah and which proposed translations for many of the geographic names included in the hieroglyphic inscriptions. De Rougé later became chair of Egyptology at the Collège de France and was succeeded by Gaston Maspero. Maspero built upon de Rougé's work and published The Struggle of the Nations, in which he described the theory of the seaborne migrations in detail in 1895–96 for a wider audience, at a time when the idea of population migrations would have felt familiar to the general population. (Note: Quote: "The English translation of Maspero's résumé of ethnic movement entitled The Struggle of the Nations (Maspero 1896) must surely have evoked meaningful associations at a time when competition for territory and economic advantage among European Powers was at a fever pitch (Hobsbawm 1987).")

The migration theory was taken up by other scholars such as Eduard Meyer and became the generally accepted theory amongst Egyptologists and Orientalists. (Note: Quote: "In fact, this migration of the Sea Peoples is not to be found in Egyptian inscriptions, but was launched by Gaston Maspero in 1873 [footnote: In the Revue Critique d'Histoire et de Littérature 1873, pp. 85–86]. Although Maspero's proposal initially seemed unlikely, it gained credibility with the publication of the Lemnos stele. In 1895, in his popular Histoire ancienne des peuples de l'orient classique [footnote; Vol. II (Paris:1895), translated into English as The Struggle of the Nations (ed. A. H. Sayce, tr. M. L. McClure, New York: 1896)], Maspero fully elaborated his scenario of "the migration of the Sea Peoples". Adopted by Eduard Meyer for the second edition of his Geschichted es Altertums, the theory won general acceptance among Egyptologists and orientalists.) Since the early 1990s, however, it has been brought into question by a number of scholars. (Note: Quote: "First coined in 1881 by the French Egyptologist G. Maspero (1896), the somewhat misleading term 'Sea Peoples' encompasses the ethnonyms Lukka, Sherden, Shekelesh, Teresh, Eqwesh, Denyen, Sikil / Tjekker, Weshesh, and Peleset (Philistines). [Footnote: The modern term 'Sea Peoples' refers to people that appear in several New Kingdom Egyptian texts as originating from 'islands' (tables 1–2; Adams and Cohen, this volume; see, e.g., Drews 1993, 57 for a summary). The use of quotation marks in association with the term 'Sea Peoples' in our title is intended to draw attention to the problematic nature of this commonly used term. The designation 'of the sea' appears only in relation to the Sherden, Shekelesh and Eqwesh. Subsequently, this term was applied somewhat indiscriminately to several additional ethnonyms, including the Philistines, who are portrayed in their earliest appearance as invaders from the north during the reigns of Merenptah and Ramesses Ill (see, e.g., Sandars 1987; Redford 1992, p. 243; for a recent review of the primary and secondary literature, see Woudhuizen 2006). Henceforth the term Sea Peoples will appear without quotation marks.]") (Note: Quote: "As E. S. Sherratt has pointed out in an enlightening study of the interplay of ideology and literary strata in the formation of the Homeric epics (1990), phases of active narrative or descriptive invention closely correspond to periods of rapid social and political change. Sherratt notes that one of the characteristic manifestations of this process – in which emerging elites seek to legitimate their power – is 'the transformation of an existing oral epic tradition in order to dress it in more recognizably modern garb' (1990: 821). Can we not see in the history of the archaeology of the Sea Peoples a similar process of literary reformulation, in which old components are reinterpreted and reassembled to tell a new tale? Narrative presupposes that both storyteller and audience share a single perspective, and therein may lie the connection between the intellectual and ideological dimensions of archaeology. To generalize beyond specific, highly localized data, archaeologists must utilize familiar conceptual frameworks and it is from the political and social ideologies of every generation that larger speculations about the historical role of the Sea Peoples have always been drawn. As many papers in this conference have suggested, traditional interpretive structures are in the process of reconsideration and renovation. That is why I believe it essential that we reflect on our current Sea Peoples stories – and see if we cannot detect the subtle yet lingering impact upon them of some timeworn Victorian narratives.")

The historical narrative stems primarily from seven Ancient Egyptian sources. Although in these inscriptions the designation "of the sea" does not appear in relation to all of these peoples, (Note: Quote: "However, of the nine peoples concerned by these wars, only four were actually defined as coming 'from wꜣd-wr' or 'from pꜣ ym'. Furthermore, these expressions seem to be linked more often to vegetation and sweet water than to seawater, and it seems clear that the term "Sea Peoples" has to be abandoned. Some will object to this, basing themselves on the expression iww hryw-ib w3d-wr, usually translated by 'islands situated in the middle of the sea', where some of the Sea Peoples are said to have come from. Indeed. it is this expression that supported the persistent idea that the 'Sea Peoples' came from the Aegean islands or at least from an East Mediterranean island. Now, these terms are misleading, not only because w3d-wr and p3 ym, quite likely, do not designate 'the sea' here, but also because the term in itself does not always mean 'island'; it can also be used to indicate other kinds of territories not necessarily maritime ones. The argument based on these alleged 'sea islands' is thus groundless ... To conclude, the Philistines came neither from Crete nor from the Aegean islands or coasts, but probably from the southern coast of Asia Minor or from Syria.") the term "Sea Peoples" is commonly used in modern publications to refer to the nine peoples. (Note: A convenient table of Sea Peoples in hieroglyphics, transliteration and English is given in Woudhuizen 2006, who developed it from works of Kitchen cited there.)

== Primary documentary records ==
The Medinet Habu inscriptions, from which the Sea Peoples concept was first described, remain the primary source and "the basis of virtually all significant discussions of them". (Note: Quote: "Thus far, rather meager documentation is available. What I shall do for the remainder of this essay is to focus on what is in fact our primary source on the Sea Peoples, the basis of virtually all significant discussions of them, including many efforts to identify the Sea Peoples with archaeologically known cultures or groups in the Mediterranean and beyond. This source is the corpus of scenes and texts relevant to the Sea Peoples displayed on the walls of the mortuary temple of Ramesses III at western Thebes. Although it has been much discussed, this corpus has often led scholars to different and contradictory conclusions, and will always probably be subject to debate because of certain ambiguities inherent in the material.")

=== List of Sea Peoples ===
Three separate narratives from Egyptian records refer to more than one of the nine peoples, found in a total of six sources. The seventh and most recent source referring to more than one of the nine peoples is a list (Onomasticon) of 610 entities, rather than a narrative. These sources are summarized in the table below.

Date	Narrative	Source(s)	Peoples named										Connection to the sea
Date	Narrative	Source(s)	Denyen	Eqwesh	Karkisha	Lukka	Peleset	Shekelesh	Sherden	Teresh	Tjekker	Weshesh	Connection to the sea
c. 1210 BC	Ramesses II narrative	Kadesh Inscriptions			y	y			y				none
c. 1200 BC	Merneptah narrative	Great Karnak Inscription		y		y		y	y	y			Eqwesh (of the countries of the sea), (Note: Breasted wrote in a footnote regarding this designation: "It is noticeable that this designation, both here and in the Athribis Stela (1. 13), is inserted only after the Ekwesh. In the Athribis Stela Ekwesh is cut off by a numeral from the preceding, showing that the designation there belongs only to them.") possibly also Sherden and Sheklesh (Note: Gardiner's commentary on the Onomasticon of Amenope, No. 268, "Srdn", quote: "The records of Meneptah are much more explicit: the great Karnak inscription described how the Ekwesh, Tursha, Lukki, Sherden and Sheklesh (L.1) had been incited against Egypt by the prince of the Libu (Libyans); in L.52 the Sherden, Sheklesh and Ekwesh are collectively described as N35 G1 N25 t Z2ss(var. N35 G1 N25 X1 Z4 G1)N35 G40 M17 M17 Aa15 D36 N35A N36 N21 'the foreign lands (var. 'foreigners') of the sea'") (Note: Note: Gardiner's reference to the alternative ("var.") writing 'foreigners' referred to Gustave Lefebvre's "Stèle de l'an V de Méneptah Archived 6 February 2017 at the Wayback Machine", ASAE 27, 1927, p.23, line 13, describing the Athribis Stele.)
c. 1200 BC	Merneptah narrative	Athribis Stele		y				y	y	y			Eqwesh (of the countries of the sea)
c. 1150 BC	Ramesses III narrative	Medinet Habu	y				y	y	y	y	y	y	Denyen (in their isles), Teresh (of the sea), Sherden (of the sea)
c. 1150 BC	Ramesses III narrative	Papyrus Harris I	y				y		y		y	y	Denyen (in their isles), Weshesh (of the sea)
c. 1150 BC	Ramesses III narrative	Rhetorical Stela					y			y			none
c. 1100 BC	List (no narrative)	Onomasticon of Amenope	y			y	y		y		y		none

=== Ramesses II narrative ===
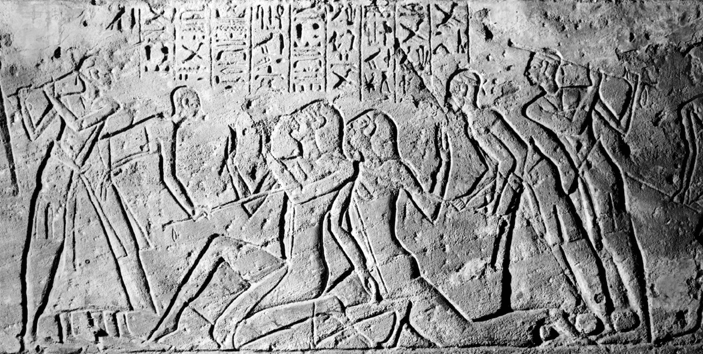
A carved relief from the Kadesh inscriptions showing Shasu spies being beaten by Egyptians

Possible records of sea peoples generally or in particular date to two campaigns of Ramesses II, a pharaoh of the militant 19th Dynasty: operations in or near the delta in the second year of his reign and the major confrontation with the Hittite Empire and allies at the Battle of Kadesh in his fifth. The years of this long-lived pharaoh's reign are not known exactly, but they must have comprised nearly all of the first half of the 13th century BC. (Note: Uncertainty of the dates is not a case of no evidence but of selecting among several possible dates. The articles in Wikipedia on related topics use one set of dates by convention but these and all dates based on them are not the only possible. A summary of the date question is given in Hasel 1998, Ch. 2, p. 151, which is available as a summary at Google Books.)

In his Second Year, an attack of the Sherden, or Shardana, on the Nile Delta was repulsed and defeated by Ramesses, who captured some of the pirates. The event is recorded on Tanis Stele II. (Note: Find this and other documents quoted in the Shardana Deprecated link archived 13 March 2008 at archive.today article by Megaera Lorenz at the Penn State site. This is an earlier version of her article, which gives a quote from Kitchen not found in the External Links site below. Breasted 1906, Volume III, Article 491, p.210, which can be found on Google books, gives quite a different translation of the passage. Unfortunately, large parts of the text are missing and must be restored, but both versions agree on the Sherden and the warships.) An inscription by Ramesses II on the stela from Tanis which recorded the Sherden raiders' raid and subsequent capture speaks of the continuous threat they posed to Egypt's Mediterranean coasts:

the unruly Sherden whom no one had ever known how to combat, they came boldly sailing in their warships from the midst of the sea, none being able to withstand them.

The Sherden prisoners were subsequently incorporated into the Egyptian army for service on the Hittite frontier by Ramesses and fought as Egyptian soldiers in the Battle of Kadesh. Another stele source is the "Aswan Stele" (one of several stelae at Aswan), which mentions the king's operations to defeat a number of peoples including those of the "Great Green" (the Egyptian name for the Mediterranean).

The Battle of Kadesh was the climax of a campaign against the rival Hittite Empire and their allies in the Levant in the pharaoh's Year 5. Ramesses divided his Egyptian forces, which were then ambushed piecemeal by the Hittite army and nearly defeated, but Ramesses managed to recover and fight to a stalemate. Ramesses left inscriptions and depictions of his victory which survive on temples at Abydos, Karnak, Luxor and Abu Simbel. The "Poem of Pentaur", describing the battle, has also survived. (Note: The poem appears in inscriptional form but the scribe, pntAwr.t, was not the author, who remains unknown. The scribe copied the poem onto Papyrus in the time of Merneptah and copies of that found their way into Papyrus Sallier III currently located in the British Museum. The details are stated in "The Battle of Kadesh". Archived from the original on 2 October 2015. on the site of the American Research Center in Egypt of Northern California. Both the inscription and the poem are published in "Egyptian Accounts of the Battle of Kadesh". Archived from the original on 31 March 2019. on the Pharaonic Egypt site.)

The poem relates that the previously captured Sherden were not only fighting for the Pharaoh but also involved in strategy: it was their idea to divide Egyptian forces into four columns. There is no evidence in Ramesses' inscriptions of any Sherden disloyalty or collaboration with the Hittites.

The poem also lists the Hittite allies who fought at Kadesh, among them some of the sea peoples spoken of in other Egyptian inscriptions who would later take part in the great migrations of the 12th century BC (see Appendix A to the Battle of Kadesh).

=== Merneptah narrative ===
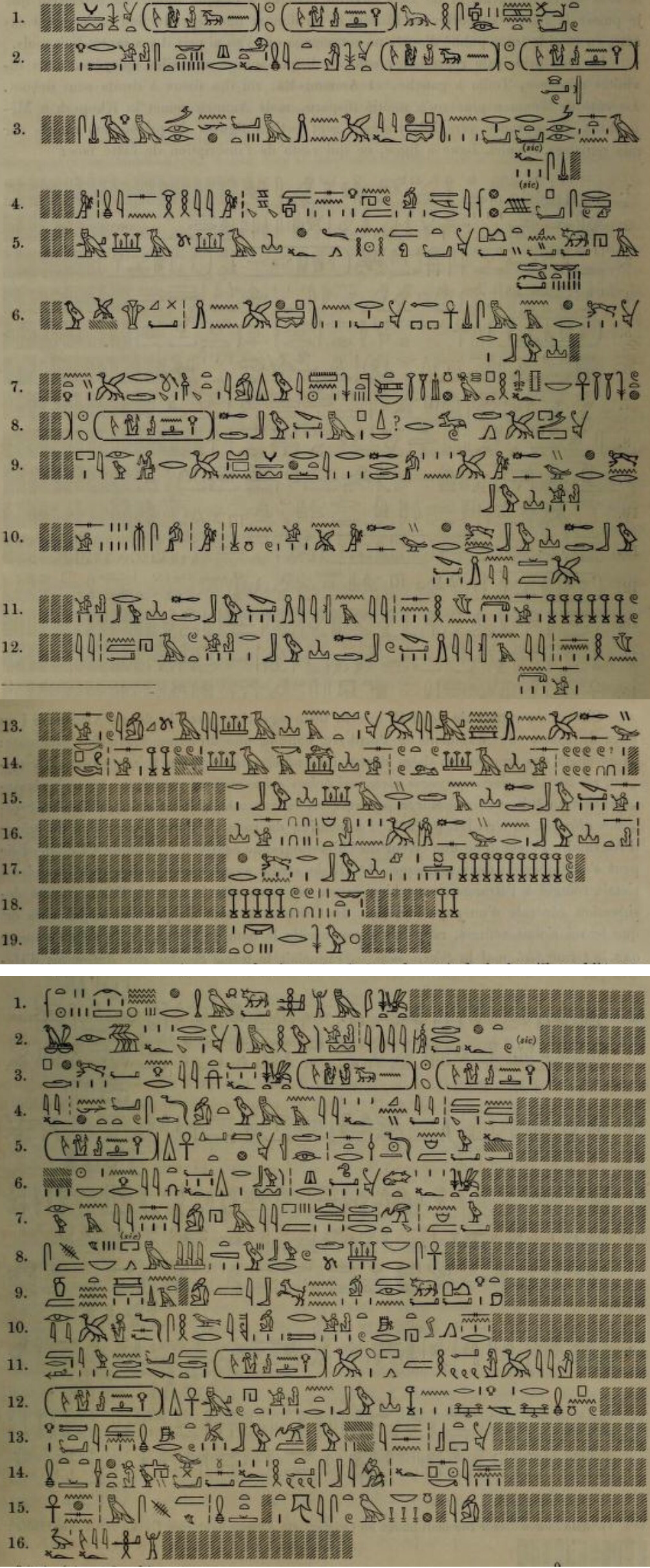
Athribis stele (showing all 19 lines and 14 lines on each face. The reference to "foreigners of the sea" is on line 13 out of 19)

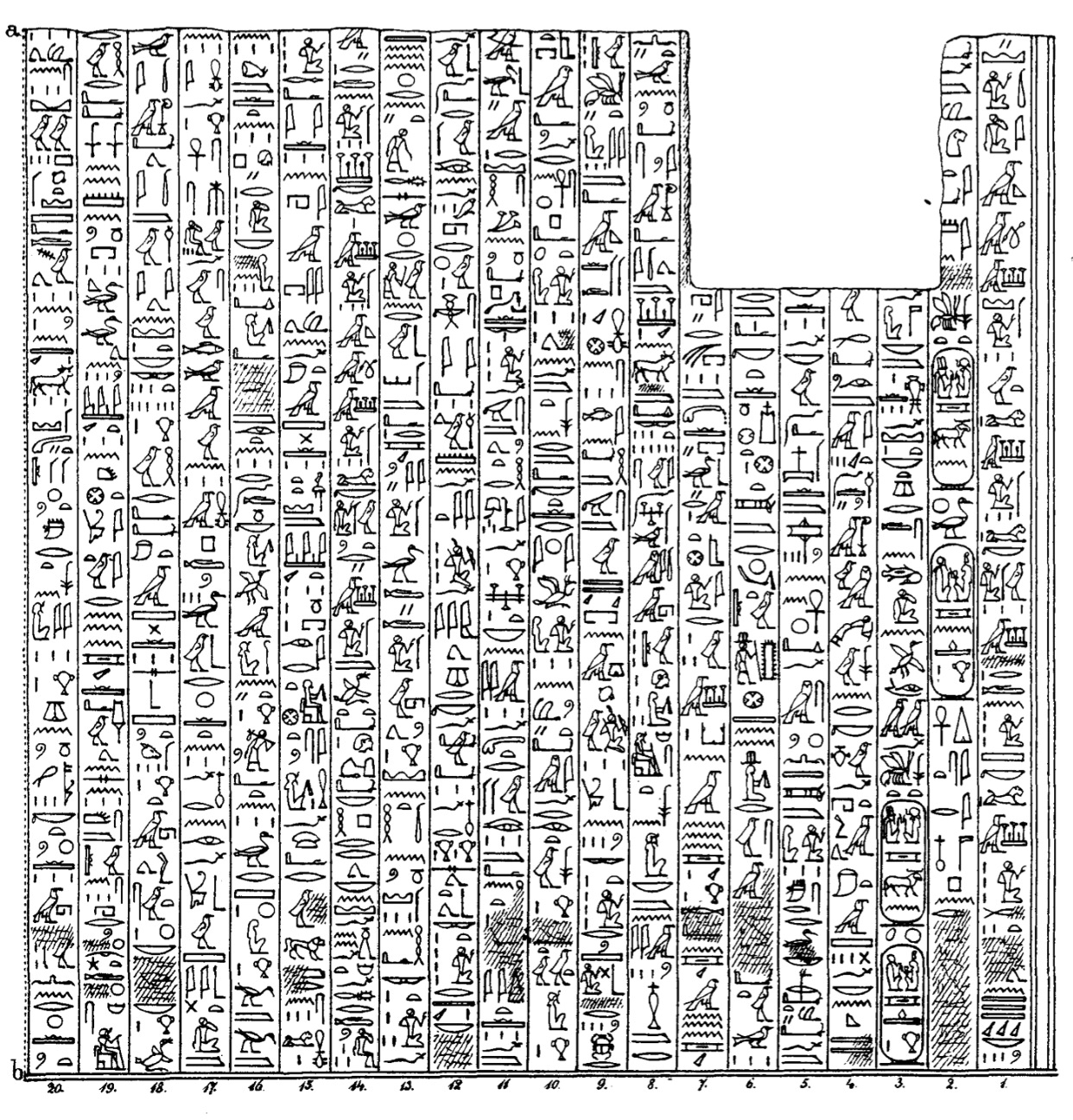
Great Karnak Inscription (lines 1-20 out of 79; line 52 includes the reference to "foreign peoples of the sea" (n3 ḫ3s.wt n<.t> p3 ym):
N35 G1 N25 t Z2ss N35 G40 M17 M17 Aa15 D36 N35A N36 N21

The major event of the reign of the Pharaoh Merneptah (1213–1203 BC), (Note: Like those of Ramses II, these dates are not certain. Von Beckerath's dates, adopted by Wikipedia, are relatively late; for example, Sanders, Ch. 5, p. 105, sets the Battle of Perire at April 15, 1220.) 4th king of the 19th Dynasty, was his battle at Perire in the western delta in the 5th and 6th years of his reign, against a confederacy termed "the Nine Bows". Depredations of this confederacy had been so severe that the region was "forsaken as pasturage for cattle, it was left waste from the time of the ancestors".

The pharaoh's action against them is attested in a single narrative found in three sources. The most detailed source describing the battle is the Great Karnak Inscription; two shorter versions of the same narrative are found in the "Athribis Stele" and the "Cairo Column". The "Cairo column" is a section of a granite column now in the Cairo Museum, which was first published by Maspero in 1881 with just two readable sentences – the first confirming the date of Year 5 and the second stating: "The wretched [chief] of Libya has invaded with ——, being men and women, Shekelesh (S'-k-rw-s) ——". The "Athribis stela" is a granite stela found in Athribis and inscribed on both sides, which like the Cairo column, was first published by Maspero two years later in 1883. The Merneptah Stele from Thebes describes the reign of peace resulting from the victory but does not include any reference to the Sea Peoples.

The Nine Bows were acting under the leadership of the king of Libya and an associated near-concurrent revolt in Canaan involving Gaza, Ascalon, Yenoam and the Israelites. Exactly which peoples were consistently in the Nine Bows is not clear, but present at the battle were the Libyans, some neighboring Meshwesh, and possibly a separate revolt in the following year involving peoples from the eastern Mediterranean, including the Kheta (or Hittites), or Syrians, and (in the Israel Stele) for the first time in history, the Israelites. In addition to them, the first lines of the Karnak inscription include some sea peoples, which must have arrived in the Western Delta or from Cyrene by ship:

[Beginning of the victory that his majesty achieved in the land of Libya] -i, Ekwesh, Teresh, Lukka, Sherden, Shekelesh, Northerners coming from all lands.

Later in the inscription Merneptah receives news of the attack:

... the third season, saying: "The wretched, fallen chief of Libya, Meryey, son of Ded, has fallen upon the country of Tehenu with his bowmen – Sherden, Shekelesh, Ekwesh, Lukka, Teresh, Taking the best of every warrior and every man of war of his country. He has brought his wife and his children – leaders of the camp, and he has reached the western boundary in the fields of Perire"

"His majesty was enraged at their report, like a lion", assembled his court and gave a rousing speech. Later, he dreamed he saw Ptah handing him a sword and saying, "Take thou (it) and banish thou the fearful heart from thee." When the bowmen went forth, says the inscription, "Amun was with them as a shield." After six hours, the surviving Nine Bows threw down their weapons, abandoned their baggage and dependants, and ran for their lives. Merneptah states that he defeated the invasion, killing 6,000 soldiers and taking 9,000 prisoners. To be sure of the numbers, among other things, he took the penises of all uncircumcised enemy dead and the hands of all the circumcised, from which history learns that the Ekwesh were circumcised, a fact causing some to doubt they were Greek.

=== Ramesses III narrative ===
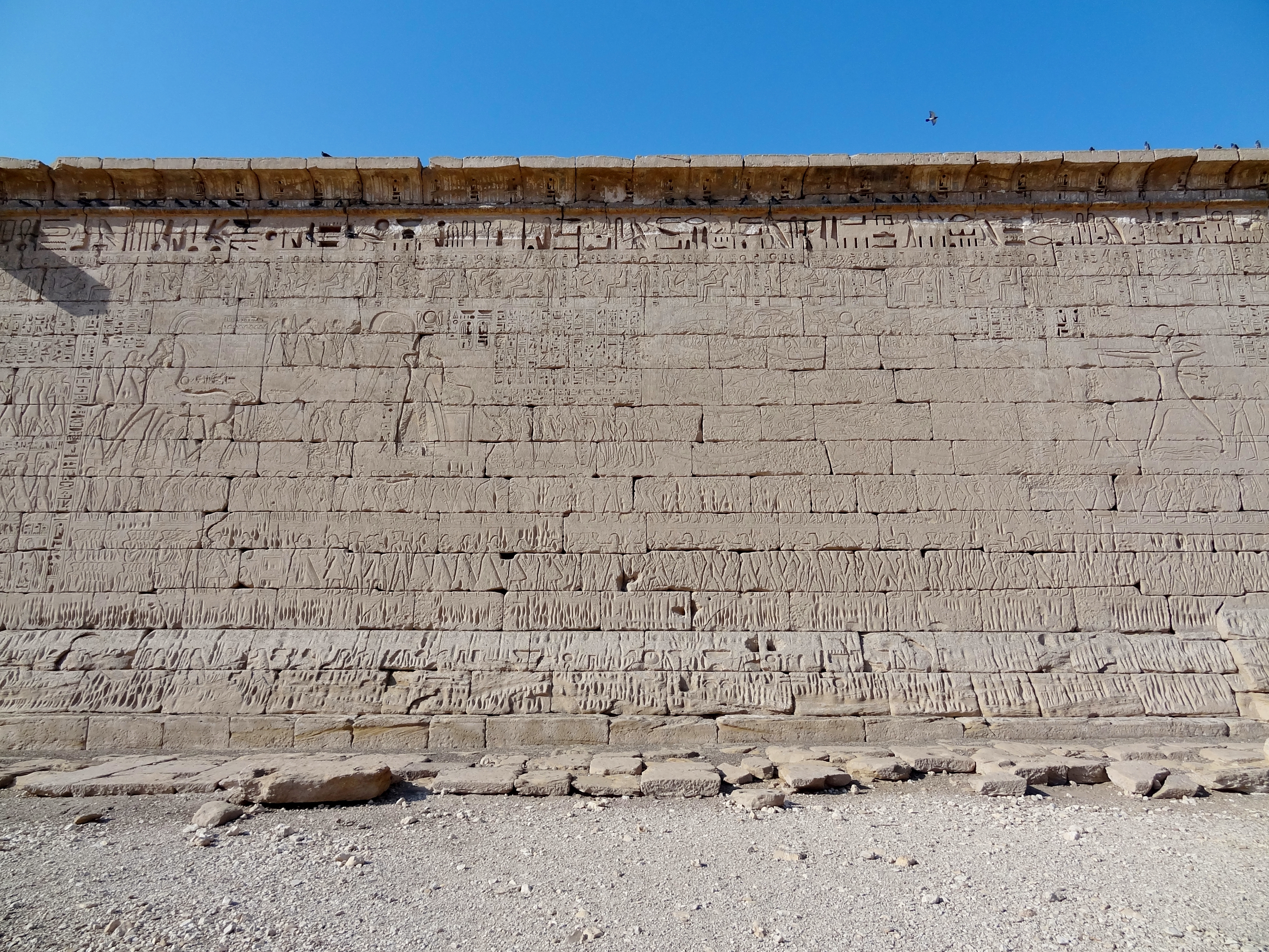
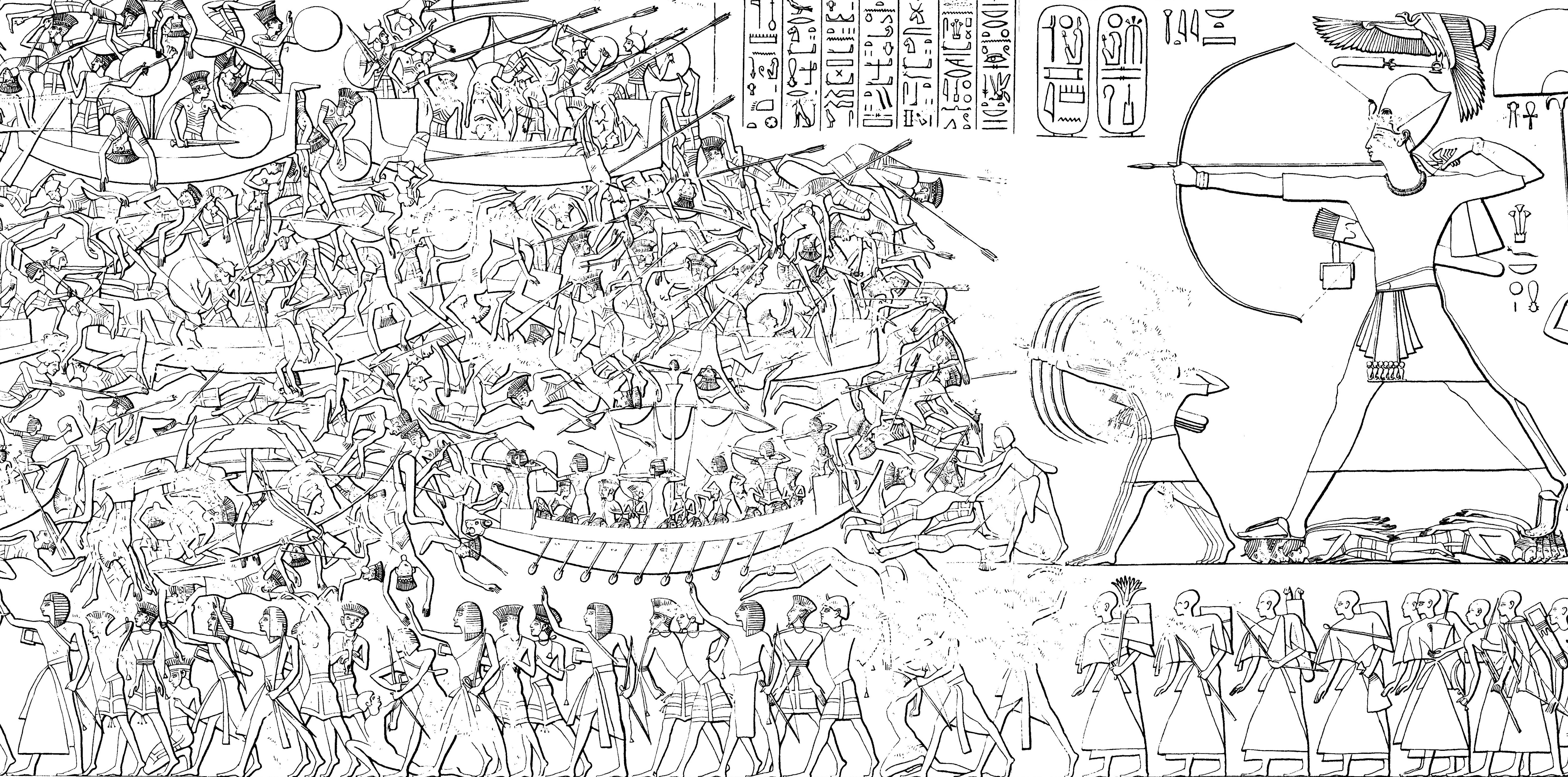
Medinet Habu northeast outside wall, showing wide view and a close-up sketch of the right-hand side relief. Behind the king (out of scene) is a chariot, above which the text describes a battle in Year 8. (Note: Text translates as "Now the northern countries, which were in their isles, were quivering in their bodies. They penetrated the channels of the Nile's mouths. Their nostrils have ceased (to function, so that) their desire is [to] breathe the breath. His majesty is gone forth like a whirlwind against them, fighting on the battlefield like a runner. The dread of him and the terror of him have entered in their bodies; (they are) capsized and overwhelmed in their places. Their hearts are taken away; their soul is flown away. Their weapons are scattered in the sea. His arrow pierces him whom he has wished among them, while the fugitive becomes one fallen into the water. His majesty is like an enraged lion, attacking his assailant with his paws; plundering on his right hand and powerful on his left hand, like Set[h] destroying the serpent 'Evil of Character'. It is Amon-Re who has overthrown for him the lands and has crushed for him every land under his feet; King of Upper and Lower Egypt, Lord of the Two Lands: Usermare-Meriamon." Translation by Egerton and Wilson, 1936, plates 37–39, lines 8–23. Also found in Breasted 1906, volume 4, p. 44, §75)

A number of primary sources about the Sea Peoples pertain to the reign of Ramesses III, who reigned from 1186 to 1155 BC. The battles were later recorded in two long inscriptions from his Medinet Habu mortuary temple, which are physically separate and somewhat different from one another. (Note: Quote: "One consists of a string of large scale scenes, complemented with relatively brief texts, extending in a narrative sequence along part of the north facade of the temple, which it shares with part of a similar narrative treatment of Ramesses III's Year 5 campaign against the Libyans. This latter sequence originates however on the west or rear wall of the temple. The other, physically quite separate composition relating to the Sea Peoples is displayed across the external (eastern) face of the great pylon which separates the first court of the temple from the second. On the pylon's southern wing is a large-scale scene – occupying most of the facade – showing Ramesses III leading three lines of captive Sea Peoples to Amun-Re, lord of Thebes (and of the empire), and his consort Mut. Displayed on the equivalent space of the north wing is a long text, without pictorial embellishment, which is a verbal statement by Ramesses III describing at length his victory over the Sea Peoples, and the extraordinary beneficence of Amun-Re thus displayed, to 'the entire land gathered together'. In fact, this apparent simplicity – two separate and somewhat different compositions relevant to the Sea Peoples-belies the actual complexity of the compositional relationship between the two Sea Peoples compositions on the one hand, and their joint relationship to the entire compositional scheme or 'program' of the entire temple on the other. Any effort to understand the historical significance of the Sea Peoples' records at Medinet Habu must take this compositional dimension into account, as well as the conceptual dimensional, the relationship of the general composition scheme or program to the functions and meanings of the temple, as understood by the Egyptians.") The Year 8 campaign is the best-recorded Sea Peoples invasion.

The fact that several civilizations collapsed around 1175 BC has led to the suggestion that the Sea Peoples may have been involved at the end of the Hittite, Mycenaean and Mitanni kingdoms. (Note: The American Hittitologist Gary Beckman writes, on page 23 of Akkadica 120 (2000): Beckman cites the first few lines of the inscription located on the NW panel of the 1st court of the temple. This extensive inscription is stated in full in English in the Woudhuizen 2006, pp. 43–56, which also contains a diagram of the locations of the many inscriptions pertaining to the reign of Ramses III on the walls of the temple at Medinet Habu.)

A terminus ante quem for the destruction of the Hittite empire has been recognized in an inscription carved at Medinet Habu in Egypt in the eighth year of Ramesses III (1175 BC). This text narrates a contemporary great movement of peoples in the eastern Mediterranean, as a result of which "the lands were removed and scattered to the fray. No land could stand before their arms, from Hatti, Kode, Carchemish, Arzawa, Alashiya on being cut off. [ie: cut down]"

Ramesses' comments about the scale of the Sea Peoples' onslaught in the eastern Mediterranean are confirmed by the destruction of the states of Hatti, Ugarit, Ascalon and Hazor around this time. As the Hittitologist Trevor Bryce observes, "It should be stressed that the invasions were not merely military operations, but involved the movements of large populations, by land and sea, seeking new lands to settle."

This situation is confirmed by the Medinet Habu temple reliefs of Ramesses III which show that "the Peleset and Tjekker warriors who fought in the land battle [against Ramesses III] are accompanied in the reliefs by women and children loaded in ox-carts."

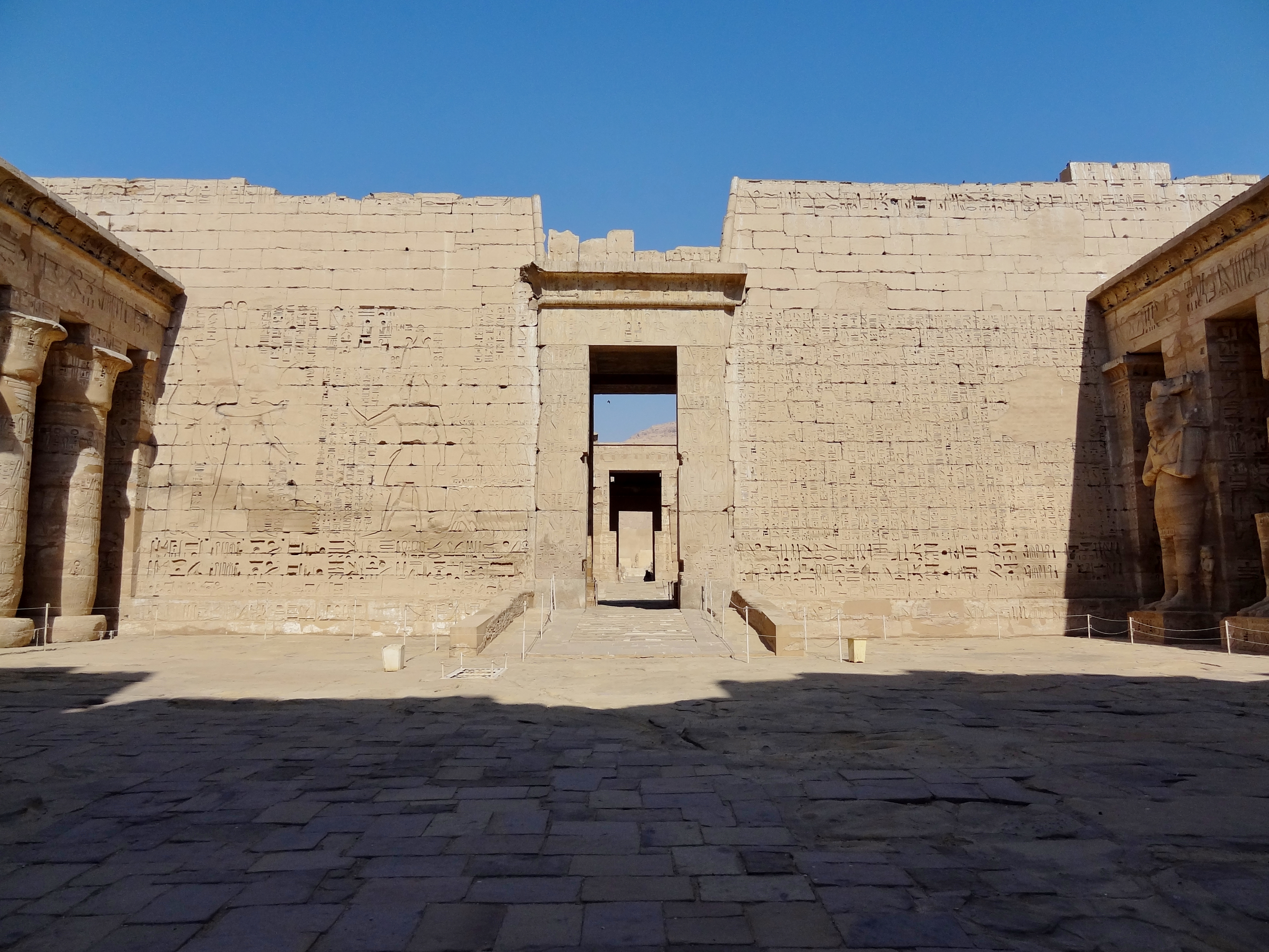
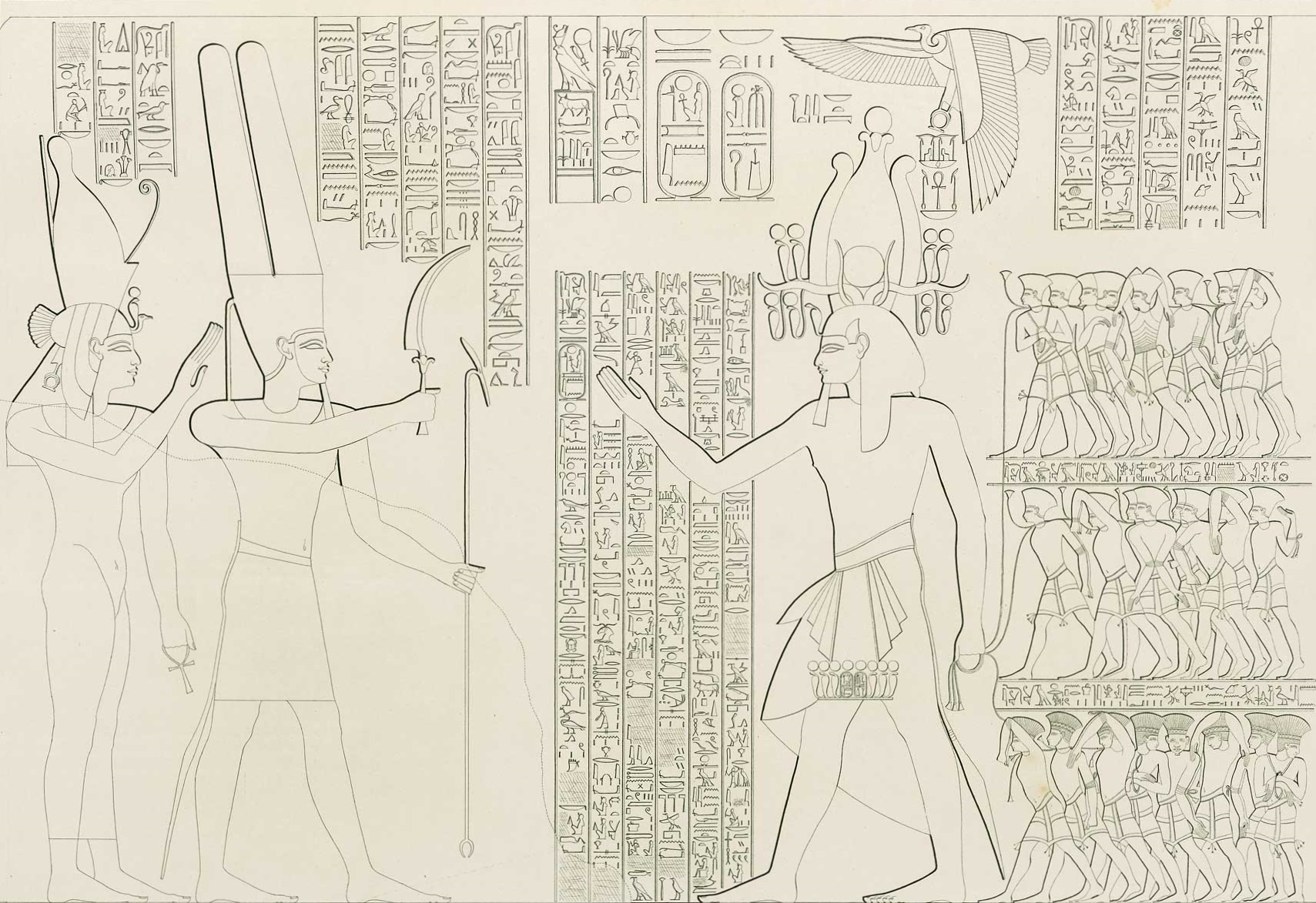
Medinet Habu Second Pylon, showing wide view and a close-up sketch of the left-hand side relief in which Amon, with Mut behind him, extends a sword to Rameses III who is leading three lines of prisoners. (Note: The text before the King includes the following:"Thou puttest great terror of me in the hearts of their chiefs; the fear and dread of me before them; that I may carry off their warriors (phrr), bound in my grasp, to lead them to thy ka, O my august father, – – – – –. Come, to [take] them, being: Peleset (Pw-r'-s'-t), Denyen (D'-y-n-yw-n'), Shekelesh (S'-k-rw-s). Thy strength it was which was before me, overthrowing their seed, – thy might, O lord of gods." On the right hand side of the Pylon is the "Great Inscription on the Second Pylon", which includes the following text:"The foreign countries made a conspiracy in their islands, All at once the lands were removed and scattered in the fray. No land could stand before their arms: from Hatti, Qode, Carchemish, Arzawa and Alashiya on, being cut off [i.e. destroyed] at one time. A camp was set up in Amurru. They desolated its people, and its land was like that which has never come into being. They were coming forward toward Egypt, while the flame was prepared before them. Their confederation was the Peleset, Tjeker, Shekelesh, Denyen and Weshesh, lands united. They laid their hands upon the land as far as the circuit of the earth, their hearts confident and trusting: 'Our plans will succeed!'")

The inscriptions of Ramesses III at Medinet Habu record three victorious campaigns against the Sea Peoples that are considered bona fide, in Years 5, 8 and 12, as well as three considered spurious, against the Nubians and Libyans in Year 5 and the Libyans with Asiatics in Year 11. During Year 8, some Hittites were operating with the Sea Peoples.

The relevant section from the Year 8 narrative:

"... As for the foreign countries, they made a [conspiracy] in their isles. [Removed] and scattered in the fray were the lands at one time. No land could stand before their arms, from Hatti, Kode, Carchemish, Yereth, 17 and Yeres on," (but they were) cut off at [one time]. A camp [was set up] in one place in Amor. They desolated its people, and its land was like that which has never come into being. They were coming, while the flame was prepared before them, forward toward Egypt. Their confederation was the Peleset, Theker, Shekelesh, Denye(n), and Weshesh, lands united. They laid their hands upon the lands to the (very) circuit of the earth, their hearts confident and trusting: 'Our plans will succeed!' ..."

The Sea Peoples attacked again Year 8 with a similar result. The campaign is recorded more extensively on the inner northwest panel of the first court. It is possible, but not generally believed, that the dates are only those of the inscriptions and both refer to the same campaign.

In Ramesses' Year 8, the Nine Bows appear as a "conspiracy in their isles". This time, they are revealed unquestionably as Sea Peoples: the Peleset, Tjeker, Shekelesh, Denyen and Weshesh, which are classified as "foreign countries" in the inscription. They camped in Amor and sent a fleet to the Nile.

He had built a fleet especially for the occasion, hidden it in the mouths of the Nile, and posted coast watchers. The enemy fleet was ambushed there, their ships overturned, and the men dragged up on shore and executed ad hoc.

The land army was also routed within Egyptian controlled territory. Additional information is given in the relief on the outer side of the east wall. This land battle occurred in the vicinity of Djahy against "the northern countries". When it was over, several chiefs were captive: of Hatti, Amor and Shasu among the "land peoples" and the Tjeker, "Sherden of the sea", "Teresh of the sea" and Peleset or Philistines.

The campaign of Year 12 is attested by the Südstele found on the south side of the temple. It mentions the Tjeker, Peleset, Denyen, Weshesh and Shekelesh.

Papyrus Harris I of the period, found behind the temple, suggests a wider campaign against the Sea Peoples but does not mention the date. In it, the persona of Ramses III says, "I slew the Denyen (D'-yn-yw-n) in their isles" and "burned" the Tjeker and Peleset, implying a maritime raid of his own. He also captured some Sherden and Weshesh "of the sea" and settled them in Egypt. As he is called the "Ruler of Nine Bows" in the relief of the east side, these events probably happened in Year 8; i.e. the Pharaoh would have used the victorious fleet for some punitive expeditions elsewhere in the Mediterranean.

The Rhetorical Stela to Ramesses III, Chapel C, Deir el-Medina records a similar narrative.

=== Onomasticon of Amenope ===
The Onomasticon of Amenope, or Amenemipit (amen-em-apt), gives slight credence to the idea that the Ramesside kings settled the Sea Peoples in Canaan. Dated to about 1100 BC (at the end of the 22nd dynasty) this document simply lists names. After six place names, four of which were in Philistia, the scribe lists the Sherden (Line 268), the Tjeker (Line 269) and the Peleset (Line 270), who might be presumed to occupy those cities. The Story of Wenamun on a papyrus of the same cache also places the Tjeker in Dor at that time. The fact that the Biblical maritime Tribe of Dan was initially located between the Philistines and the Tjekker, has prompted some to suggest that they may have originally been Denyen. Sherden seem to have been settled around Megiddo and in the Jordan Valley, and Weshesh (connected by some with the Biblical tribe of Asher) may have been settled further north.

== Other documentary records ==
=== Egyptian single-name sources ===
Other Egyptian sources refer to one of the individual groups without reference to any of the other groups.

The Amarna letters, around the mid-14th century BC, including four relating to the Sea Peoples:

- EA 151 refers to the Denyen, in a passing reference to the death of their king;
- EA 38 refers to the Lukka, who are being accused of attacking the Egyptians in conjunction with the Alashiyans (Cypriotes), with the latter having stated that the Lukka were seizing their villages.
- EA 81, EA 122 and EA 123 refer to the Sherden. The letters at one point refer to a Sherden man as an apparent renegade mercenary, and at another point to three Sherden who are slain by an Egyptian overseer.

Padiiset's Statue refers to the Peleset, the Cairo Column refers to the Shekelesh, the Story of Wenamun refers to the Tjekker, and 13 further Egyptian sources refer to the Sherden. (Note: Per Killebrew 2013, pp 2–5, these are: Stele of Padjesef, Tanis Stele, Papyrus Anastasi I, Papyrus Anastasi II, Stele of Setemhebu, Papyrus Amiens, Papyrus Wilbour, Adoption Papyrus, Papyrus Moscow 169, Papyrus BM 10326, Papyrus Turin 2026, Papyrus BM 10375, Donation Stele)

=== Byblos ===
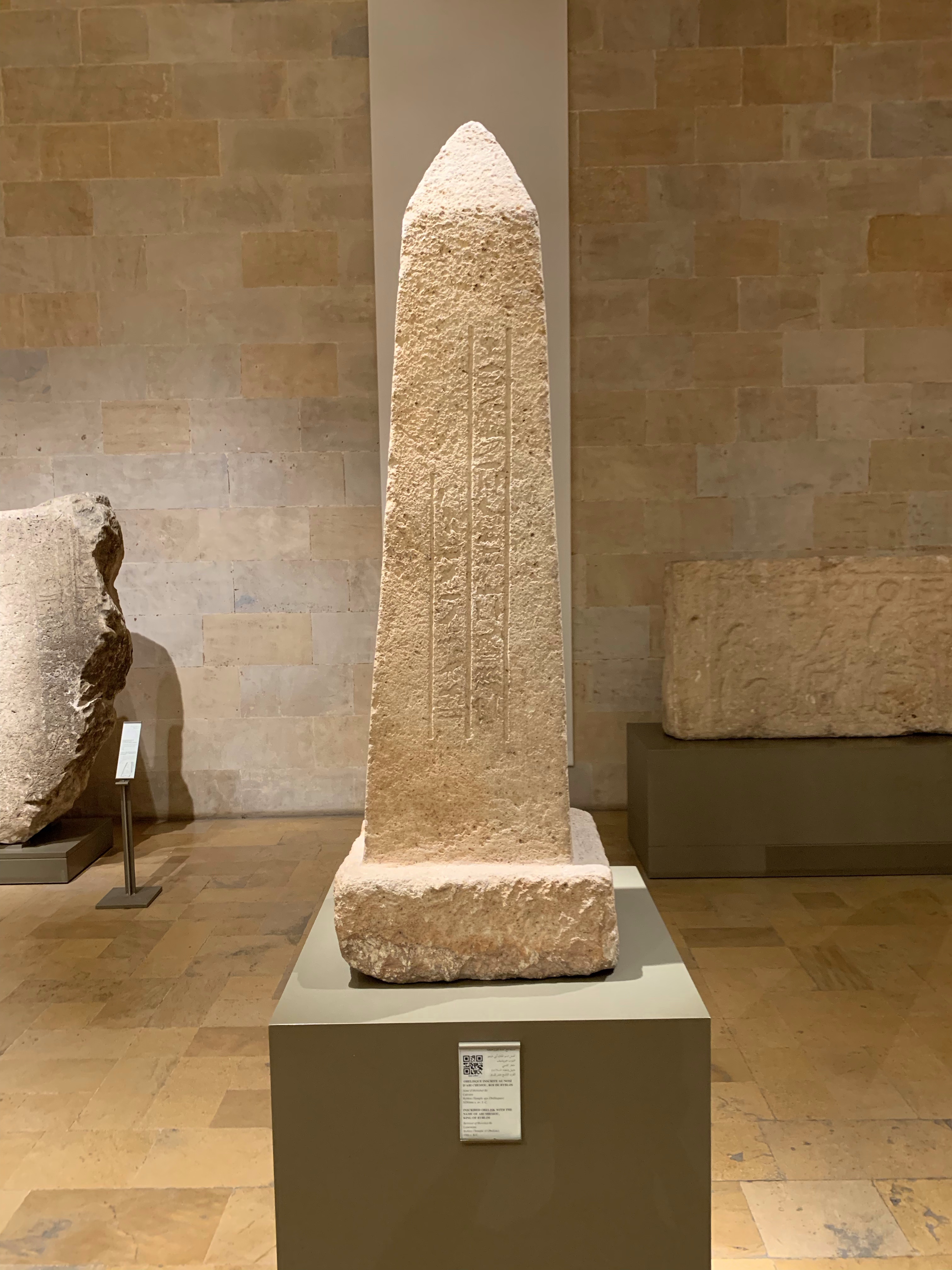
The Abishemu obelisk, includes the words "Kwkwn ś: Rwqq" translated as "Kukun, son of Lukka"

The earliest ethnic group later considered among the Sea Peoples is believed to be attested in Egyptian hieroglyphs on the Abishemu obelisk found in the Temple of the Obelisks at Byblos by Maurice Dunand. The inscription mentions kwkwn son of rwqq- (or kukun son of luqq), transliterated as Kukunnis, son of Lukka, "the Lycian". The date is given variously as 2000 or 1700 BC.

=== Ugarit ===
Destructions at Gibala-Tell Tweini

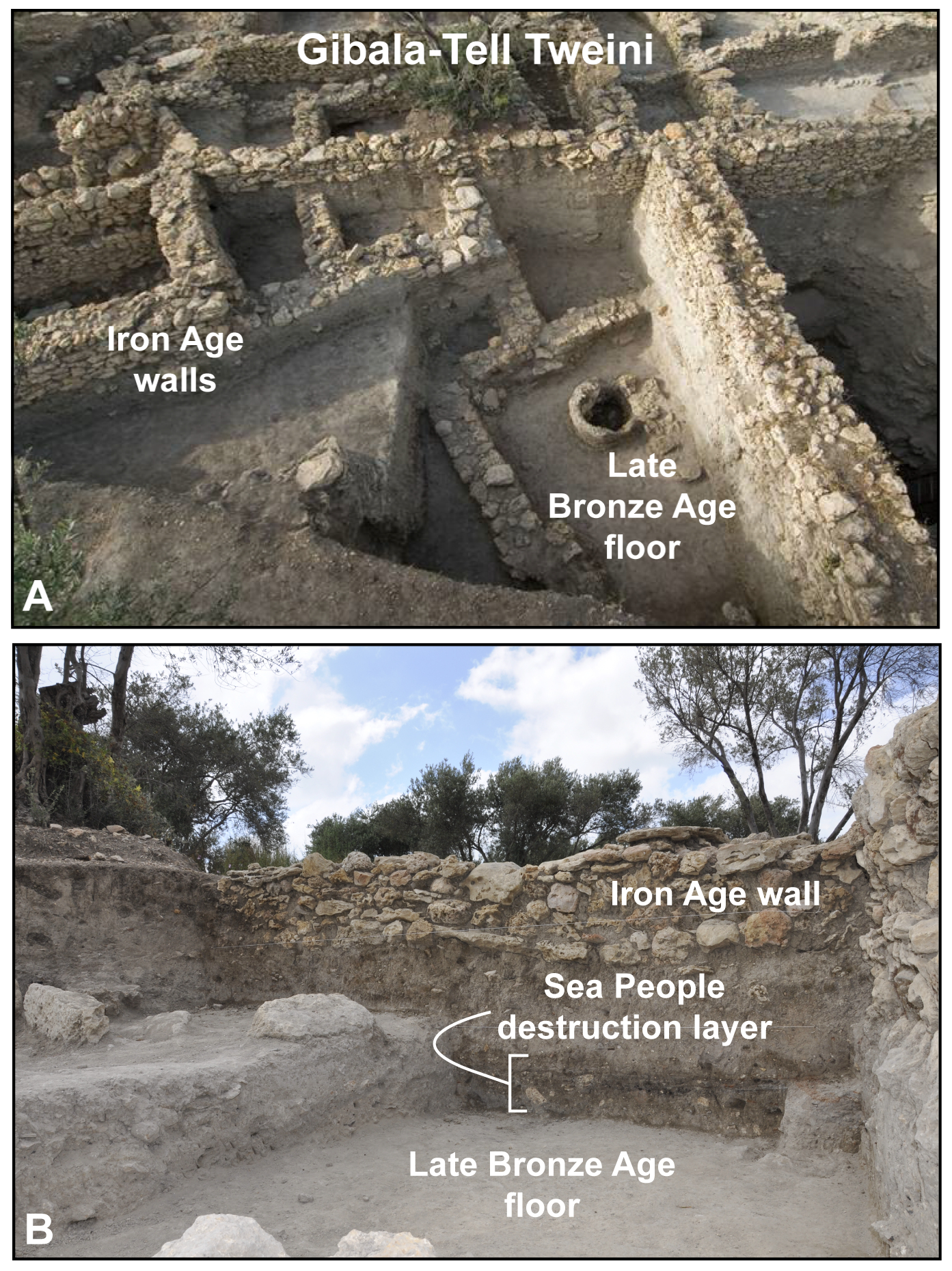
Harbour town Gibala-Tell Tweini (Ugarit kingdom) and the Sea People destruction layer.

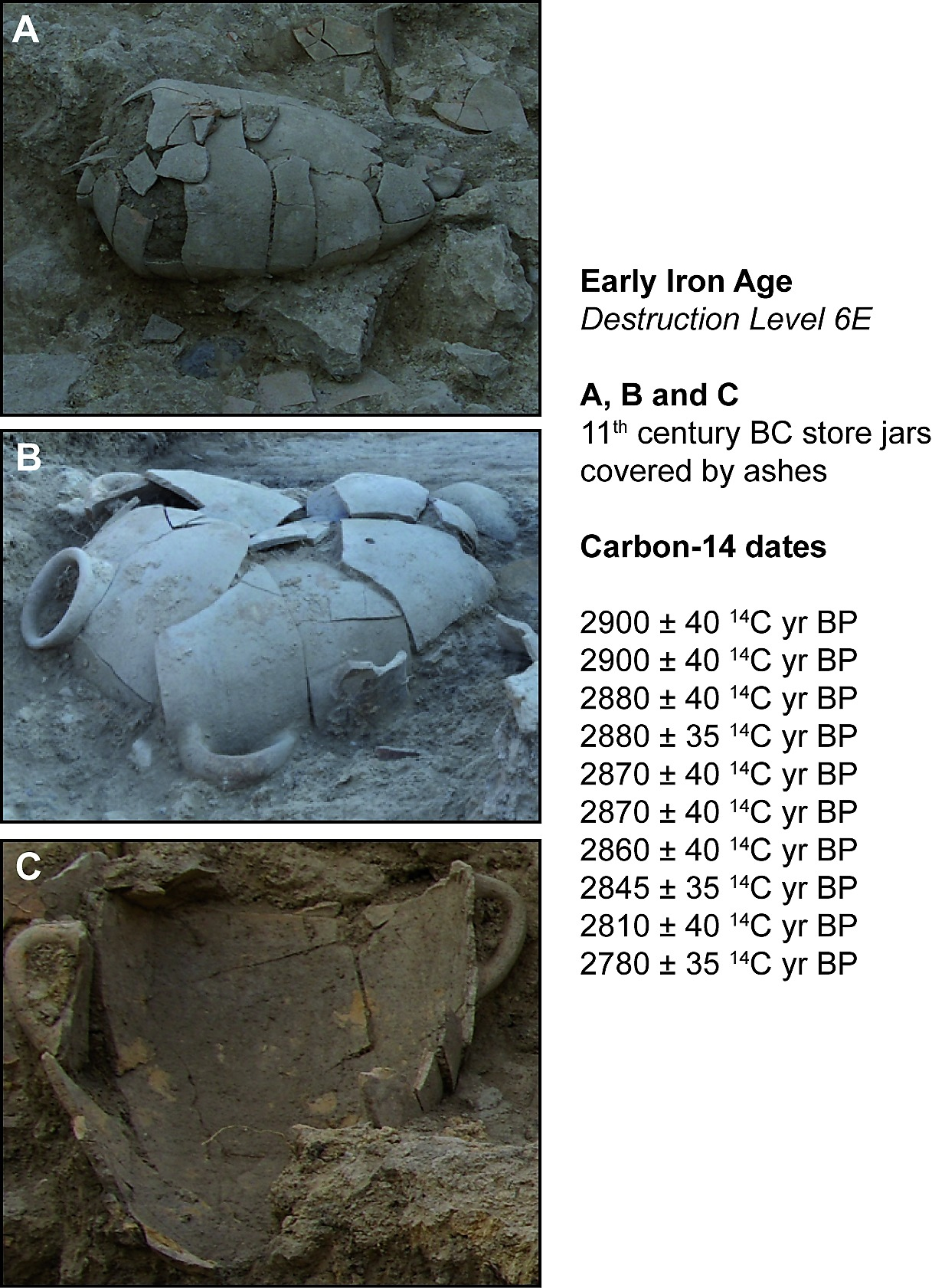
Gibala-Tell Tweini. Storage jars found in the Early Iron Age destruction layer.

Some Sea Peoples appear in four of the Ugaritic texts, the last three of which seem to foreshadow the destruction of the city around 1180 BC. The letters are therefore dated to the early 12th century. The last king of Ugarit was Ammurapi (c. 1191–1182 BC), who, throughout this correspondence, is quite a young man.

- RS 34.129, the earliest letter, found on the south side of the city, from "the Great King", presumably Suppiluliuma II of the Hittites, to the prefect of the city. He says that he ordered the king of Ugarit to send him Ibnadushu for questioning, but the king was too immature to respond. He, therefore, wants the prefect to send the man, whom he promises to return. What this language implies about the relationship of the Hittite empire to Ugarit is a matter of interpretation. Ibnadushu had been kidnapped by and had resided among a people of Shikala, probably the Shekelesh, "who lived on ships". The letter is generally interpreted as an interest in military intelligence by the king. (Note: The texts of the letters are transliterated and translated in Woudhuizen 2006, pp. 43–56 and also are mentioned and hypotheses are given about them in Sandars 1987, p. 142)
- RS L 1, RS 20.238 and RS 20.18, are a set from the Rap'anu Archive between a slightly older Ammurapi, now handling his own affairs, and Eshuwara, the grand supervisor of Alasiya. Evidently, Ammurapi had informed Eshuwara, that an enemy fleet of 20 ships had been spotted at sea. Eshuwara wrote back and inquired about the location of Ammurapi's own forces. Eshuwara also noted that he would like to know where the enemy fleet of 20 ships are now located. (Note: The sequence, only recently completed, appears in Woudhuizen 2006, pp. 43–56, along with the news that the famous oven, still reported at many sites and in many books, in which the second letter was hypothetically being baked at the destruction of the city, was not an oven, the city was not destroyed at that time, and a third letter existed.) Unfortunately for both Ugarit and Alasiya, neither kingdom was able to fend off the Sea People's onslaught, and both were ultimately destroyed. A letter by Ammurapi (RS 18.147) to the king of Alasiya—which was in fact a response to an appeal for assistance by the latter—has been found by archaeologists. In it, Ammurapi describes the desperate plight facing Ugarit. (Note: Quote: "My father, behold, the enemy's ships came (here); my cities(?) were burned, and they did evil things in my country. Does not my father know that all my troops and chariots(?) are in the Land of Hatti, and all my ships are in the Land of Lukka? ... Thus, the country is abandoned to itself. May my father know it: the seven ships of the enemy that came here inflicted much damage upon us.") Ammurapi, in turn, appealed for aid from the viceroy of Carchemish, which actually survived the Sea People's onslaught; King Kuzi-Teshub I, who was the son of Talmi-Teshub—a direct contemporary of the last ruling Hittite king, Suppiluliuma II—is attested in power there, running a mini-empire which stretched from "Southeast Asia Minor, North Syria ... [to] the west bend of the Euphrates" from c. 1175 BC to 990 BC. Its viceroy could only offer some words of advice for Ammurapi. (Note: Quote: "As for what you [Ammurapi] have written to me: "Ships of the enemy have been seen at sea!" Well, you must remain firm. Indeed for your part, where are your troops, your chariots stationed? Are they not stationed near you? No? Behind the enemy, who press upon you? Surround your towns with ramparts. Have your troops and chariots enter there, and await the enemy with great resolution!")

== Groups ==
The list of Sea Peoples groups include some which are securely identified and others which are not.

=== Lukka ===
The Lukka people are known from numerous other Hittite and ancient Egyptian records. While the Lukka lands were located in the later region of Lycia, Lukka people appear to have been highly mobile. The Lukka were never a unified kingdom, instead having a decentralized political structure. The Lukka people were famously fractious, with Hittite and Egyptian records describing them as raiders, rebels, and pirates. Lukka people fought against the Hittites as part of the Assuwa confederation, and later fought for the Hittites in the Battle of Kadesh.

=== Karkiya ===
Karkiya was a region in western Anatolia known from references in Hittite and Egyptian records. Karkiya was governed by a council of chiefs rather than a king, and was not a unified political entity. The Karkiyans had relations with the Hittite Empire, but were never part of the empire proper. Relations with the Hittites had ups and downs, and Karkiyan soldiers fought for the Hittites at the Battle of Kadesh, most likely as mercenaries. The name has been argued to be related to later terms for Caria, though the linguistic connection is not certain.

=== Peleset ===
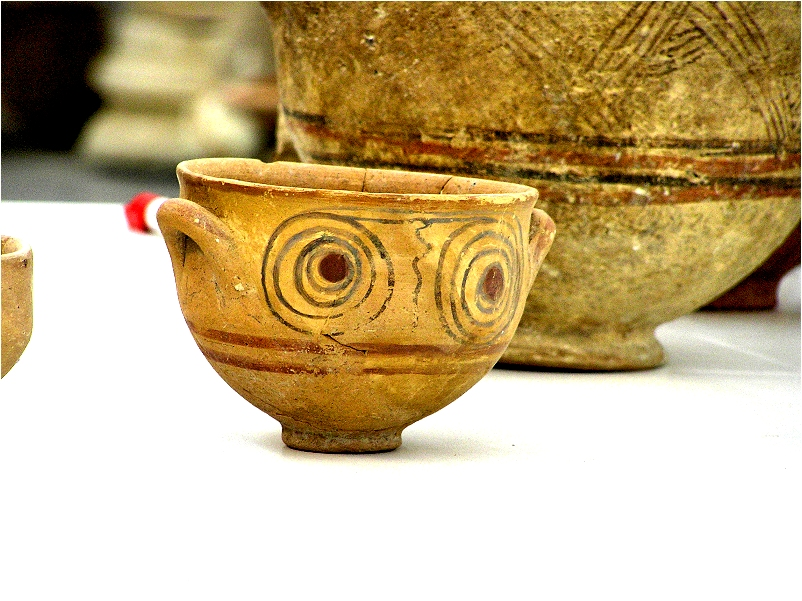
Philistine Bichrome pottery

Historians generally identify the Peleset with the later Philistines. The Peleset are generally regarded as originating somewhere within the Aegean cultural area; evidence for this identification comes from Genesis 10:14, which associates the Philistines with Caphtor and Casluhim, and Deuteronomy 2:23, which mentions the Caphtorim settling in Gaza. Aegean-style material remains such as Philistine Bichrome ware, as well as genetic evidence suggest that immigrants from Europe settled in sites such as Ashkalon at the beginning of the Iron Age. Both genetic and archaeological evidence suggests that any newcomers quickly acculturated and intermarried with local populations.

=== Shekelesh ===
The Shekelesh appear in the earlier Great Karnak Inscription, where they are described as auxiliary troops of the Libyan ruler Meryey. In the inscription, the Pharaoh Merneptah claims that he killed between 200 and 222 of them. They may also appear in Hittite records as the seafaring Shikalayu (Hittite: 𒅆𒅗𒆷𒅀𒌋 ši-ka-la-ia/u-u), though this connection is speculative. It has been hypothesized that the Shekelesh have some connection to Sicily, though evidence is sparse, and proposals vary as to whether Sicily was their original homeland, or if they settled there after the Bronze Age.

=== Sherden ===
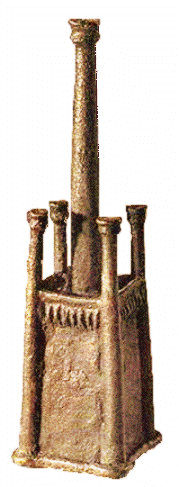
Bronze model of a nuraghe. 10th century BC

The Sherden are previously mentioned in the records of Ramesses II, who claimed to have defeated them in his second year (1278 BC) when they attempted to raid Egypt's coast. The pharaoh subsequently incorporated many of them into his personal guard. They may also appear in the Amarna Letters, with their name rendered in Akkadian as "še-er-ta-an-nu". Based on onomastic similarities, similar weapons, presence in the same places of the Mediterranean and similar relationships with other peoples there, and other analysis of historical and archaeological sources, some archaeologists have proposed to identify the Sherden with the Nuragic civilization of Sardinia. Potential further evidence for this position comes from 12th century Nuragic pottery found at Pyla-Kokkinokremos, a fortified settlement in Cyprus. (Note: Quote: "Si aggiunge ora la individuazione di un vaso a collo con anse a gomito rovescio, nuragico della Sardegna occidentale o nord occidentale, frammetario, restaurato ab antiquo con una duplice placca di piombo dell'iglesiente, presso Pyla-Kokkinokremos, un centro fortificato cipriota nell'entroterra del golfo di Larnaka (Kition), vissuto mezzo secolo fra il 1200 e il 1150 a.C." (Now the identification of a neck vase with inverted elbow handles is added, Nuragic from western or north-western Sardinia, fragmentary, restored from the outside with a double-lead plaque of the Iglesiente, near Pyla-Kokkinokremos, a fortified Cypriot center inland of the Gulf of Larnaka (Kition), lived half a century between 1200 and 1150 BC.))

=== Weshesh ===
The Weshesh are the most sparsely attested among the Sea People. They are only found in documents pertaining to the reign of Ramesses III, and no visual representation of them has ever been identified.

=== Ekwesh and Denyen ===
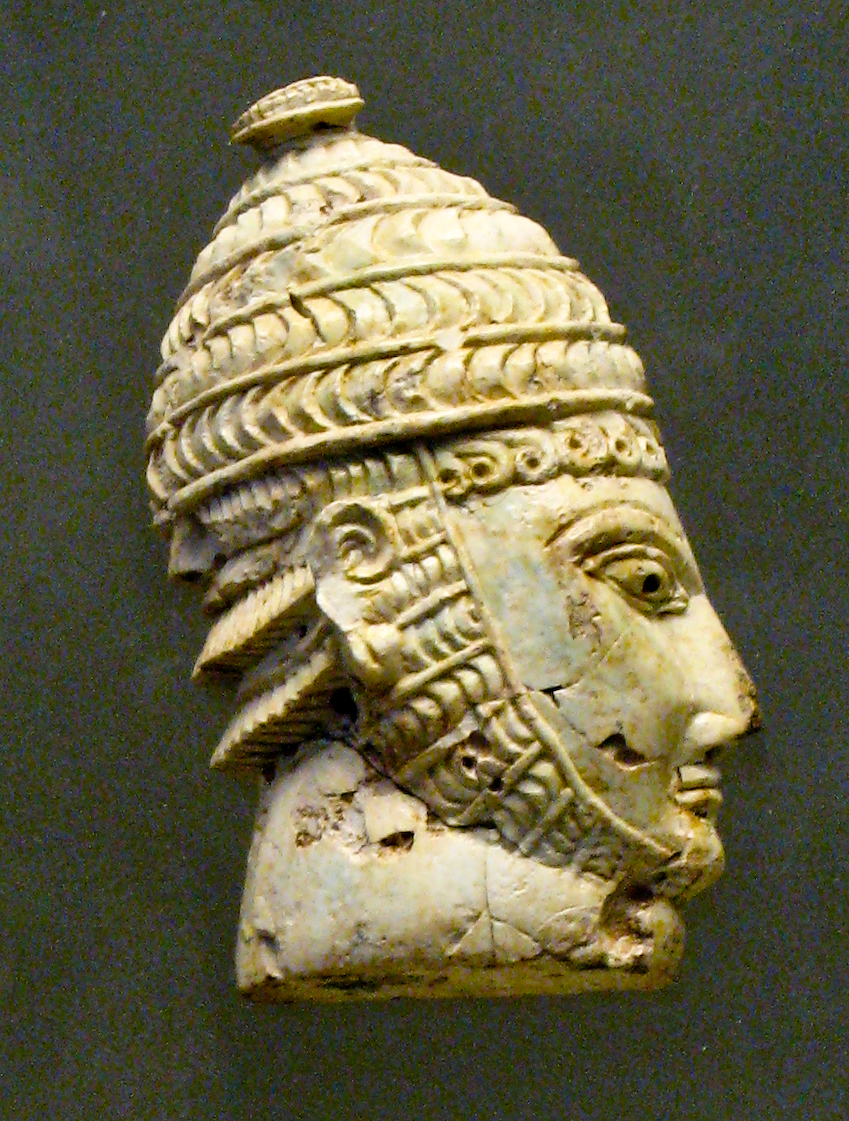
Warrior wearing a boar's tusk helmet, from a Mycenaean chamber tomb in the Acropolis of Athens, 14th–13th century BC.

The Ekwesh and the Denyen have been tentatively identified with the Ancient Greek ethnonyms Ἀχαι(ϝ)οί, (Achai(w)oí) and Δαναοί, (Danaoí), which are attested in the Homeric epics.

=== Tjeker ===
The Tjeker are commonly known from the Story of Wenamun but also took part in the Battle of Perire against the Egyptians along with the Battle of the Delta under the rule of Ramesses III. They are thought to have settled along the coasts of early Palestine and to have been the people who developed Tel Dor from a town to a larger city. Much like other groups, their origins are unknown, though some historians have suggested they could have originated from Zakros, Crete, or that they may have originated from the Teucri tribe that roamed northwest Anatolia to the south of Troy, though this has been dismissed as "pure speculation" by Trevor Bryce.

== See also ==
- Hyksos
- Meryey
- Minoan civilization
- Tel Dor
- Thalassocracy
- Troy
