= Weshesh =

Poorly understood ancient Mediterranean group

The Weshesh (Ancient Egyptian: wꜣšꜣšꜣ, wꜣšš) were one of the several ethnic groups the Sea Peoples were said to be composed of, appearing in fragmentary historical and iconographic records in ancient Egyptian from the Eastern Mediterranean in the late 2nd millennium BC.

== Records ==
Of the various groups which made up the Sea Peoples, the Weshesh are perhaps the least attested. Along with the Ekwesh, the Weshesh are found only in documents pertaining to the reign of Ramesses III, namely the second pylon of his mortuary temple at Medinet Habu, and the Great Harris Papyrus. No visual representation of the Weshesh has ever been identified.

According to the inscriptions at Medinet Habu, the Weshesh were camped in Amurru alongside the Peleset, Tjeker, Sherden, and Denyen. The apparent coalition was decimated by the pharaoh and his armies, and Ramesses III records himself as leading a glorious procession of Sea People prisoners on the return journey.

== Identification ==
Being so sparsely attested to, the identification of the Weshesh with any number of other peoples is more contested in comparison to other Sea People groups. In 1872, François Chabas identified the Weshesh with the Osci, a South Italic people, based on the phonological similarities between the two peoples' names. A year later, in 1873, Gaston Maspero published his "Anatolian hypothesis" which hypothesized the Sea Peoples originated in Asia Minor; connecting the Weshesh with the Carian settlement Wassos. In 1922, the Egyptologist Henry R. Hall connected the Weshesh with the Waksioi of Crete.
