= Kadesh inscriptions =

Egyptian hieroglyphic inscriptions describing the Battle of Kadesh

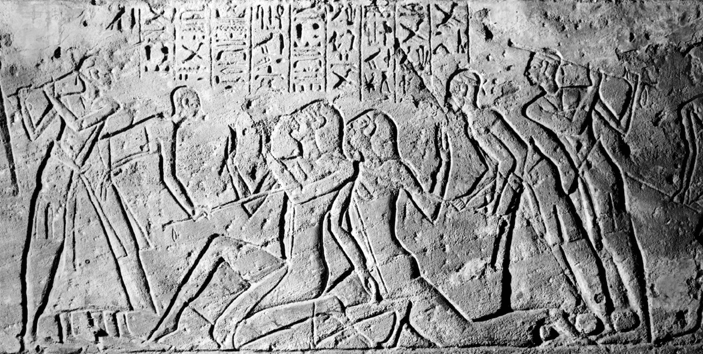
A carved relief showing Shasu spies being beaten by Egyptians

The Kadesh inscriptions or Qadesh inscriptions are a variety of Egyptian hieroglyphic inscriptions describing the Battle of Kadesh (1274 BC). The combined evidence in the form of texts and wall reliefs provide the best documented description of a battle in all of ancient history.

The Egyptian version of the battle of Kadesh is recorded in two primary accounts, known as the Bulletin or Report and the Poem, which are often placed side by side at the locations where they were inscribed. In addition, reliefs inscribed at the same location depict the battle. Some scholars divide these accounts into three. The Bulletin is repeated seven times and the Poem eight times, spread across temples in Abydos, Luxor Temple, Karnak, Abu Simbel and the Ramesseum, and two hieratic papyri.

The Song of the Sea in the Hebrew Bible echoes the structures and imagery of the Poem; it is recited daily as part of Jewish prayer.

== Poem ==
The Poem of Pentaur (pntAwr.t), usually referred to in short as The Poem, is known from eight inscriptions and lists the peoples which went to Kadesh as allies of the Hittites. Amongst them are some of the Sea Peoples and many of the other peoples who would later take part in battles of the 12th century BC (see Battle of Kadesh).

== Bulletin ==
The Bulletin or the Record is itself simply a lengthy caption accompanying the reliefs.

Eight copies survive today on the temples at Abydos, Karnak, Luxor and Abu Simbel, with reliefs depicting the battle.

== Other inscriptions ==
In addition to these lengthy presentations, there are also numerous small captions used to point out various elements of the battle.

Outside of the inscriptions, a hieratic copy of the Poem is preserved in the Raifet-Sallier papyrus, of which the first page is lost, the second page ("Papyrus Raifet") is in the Louvre and the third page ("Papyrus Sallier III") is in the British Museum. However, this is "an inaccurate copy of the whole text".

Cuneiform references to the battle have been found at Hattusa, including a letter from Ramesses to Hattusili III written in response to a scoffing complaint by Hattusili about the pharaoh's victorious depiction of the battle. However, no annals have been discovered that might describe it as part of a campaign. Instead, there are various references made to it in the context of other events.

== Copies ==
=== Poem ===
- Luxor Temple pylon, north side of both towers
- Karnak, outside the south wall of the Great Hypostyle Hall
- Abydos: Ramesses II temple

=== Bulletin ===
- Abu Simbel: Great Temple north wall of the first hall
- Ramesseum, west side of first pylon
- Luxor Temple pylon, south side

=== Reliefs ===
- Abydos: Ramesses II temple, outside walls
- Ramesseum, first pylon
- Ramesseum, second pylon
- Karnak
- Luxor Temple pylon:
- Temple of Derr
- Abu Simbel: Great Temple north wall of the first hall

== Gallery ==
Abydos

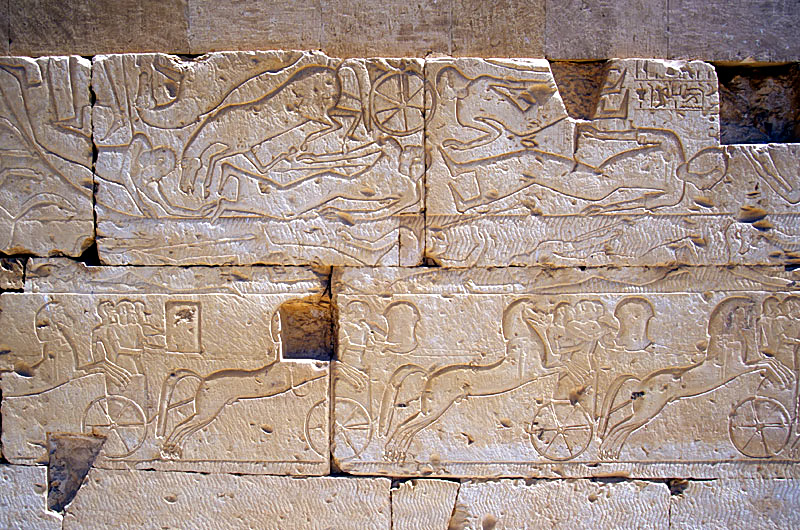
Luxor

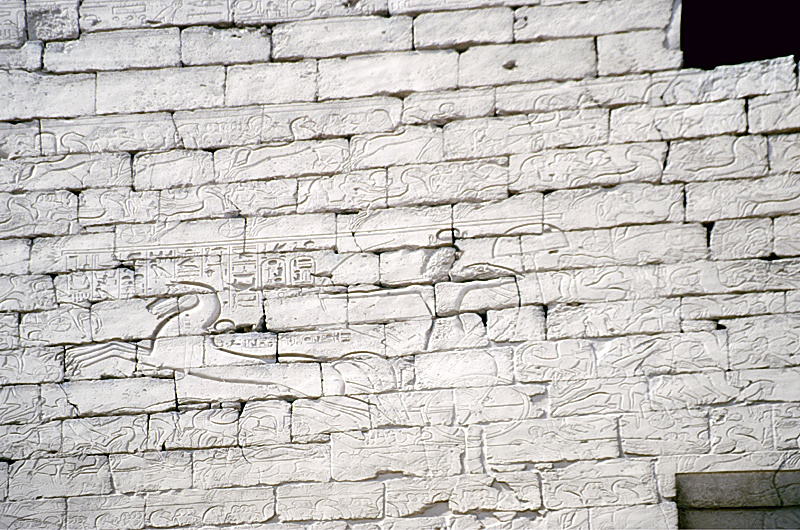

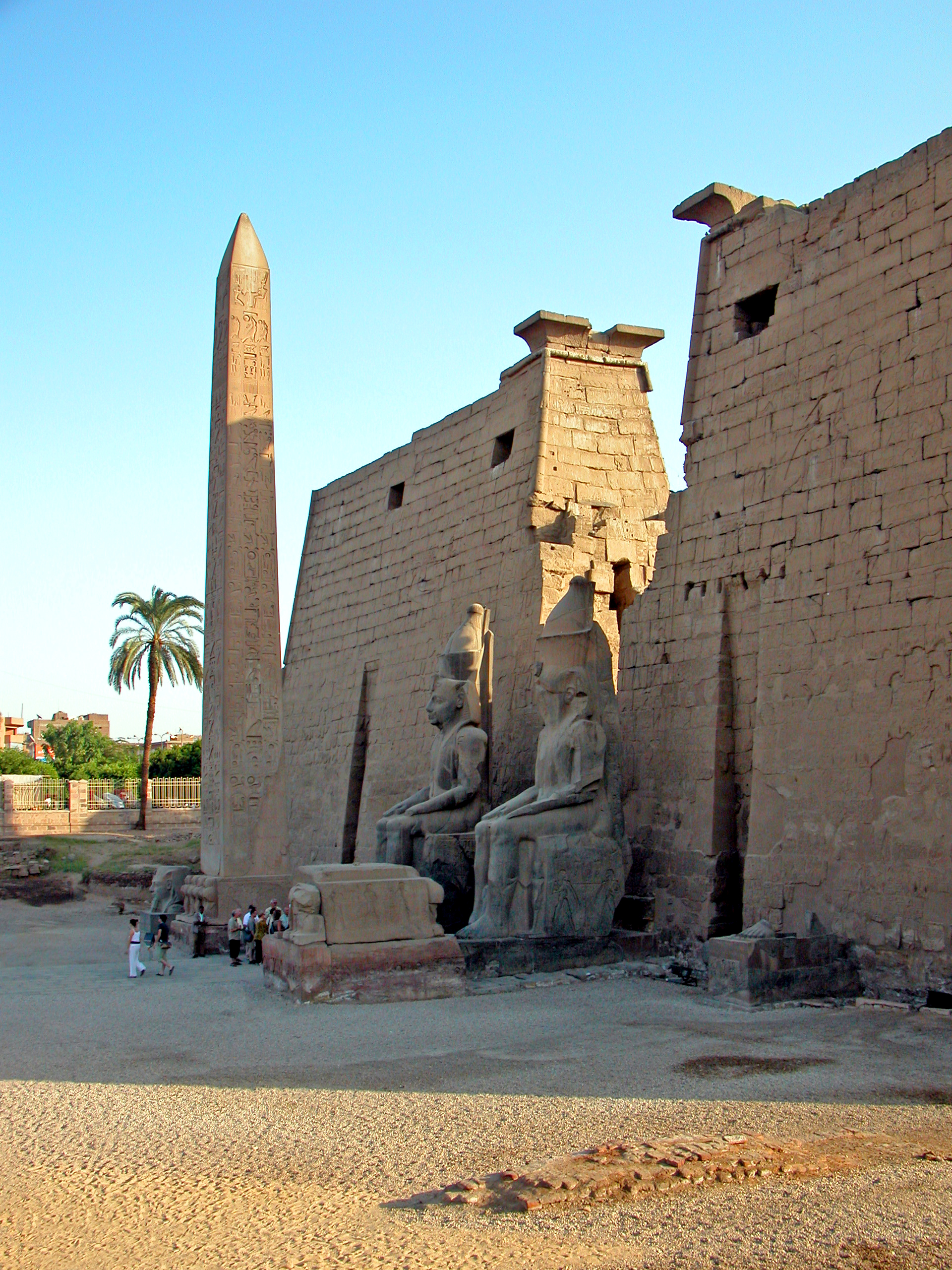
Karnak

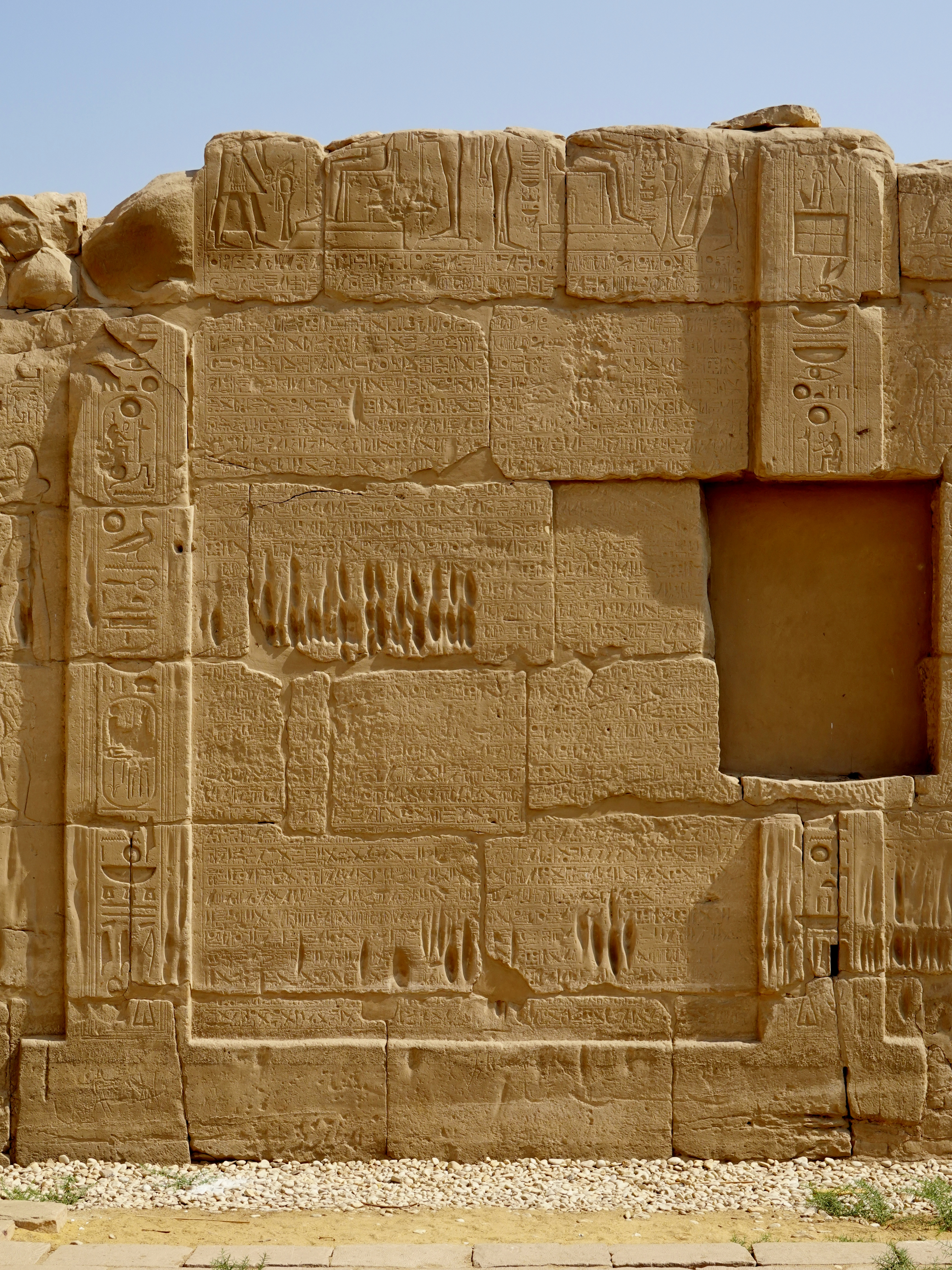
Ramesseum

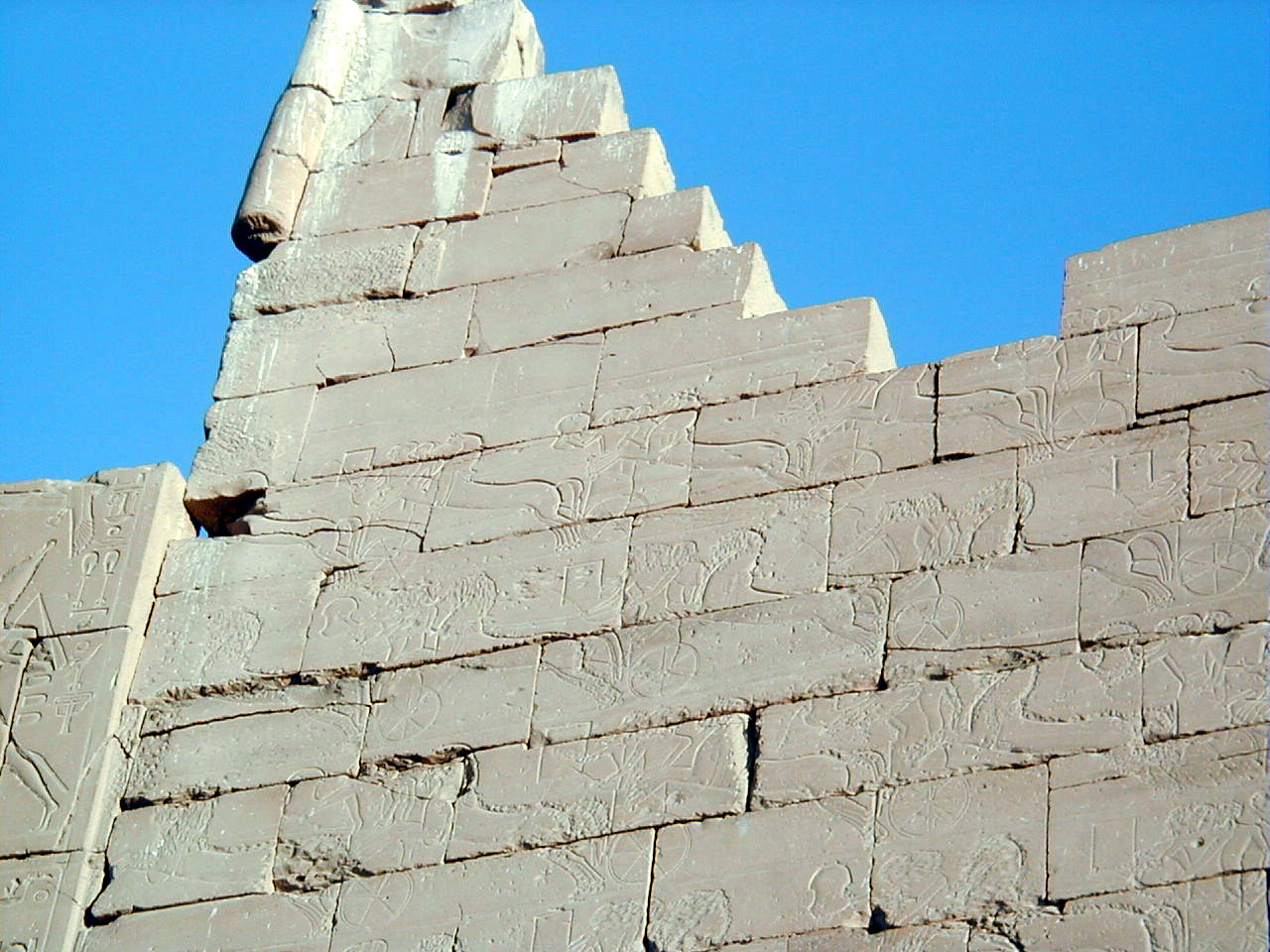

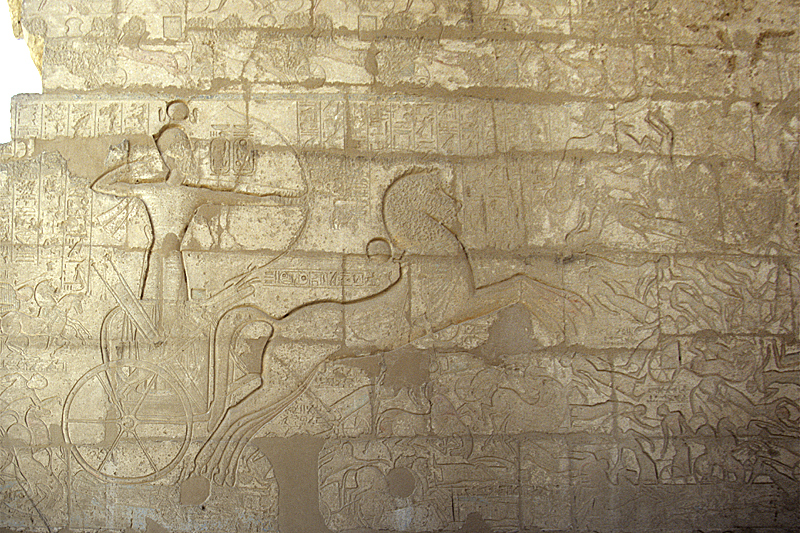
Abu Simbel

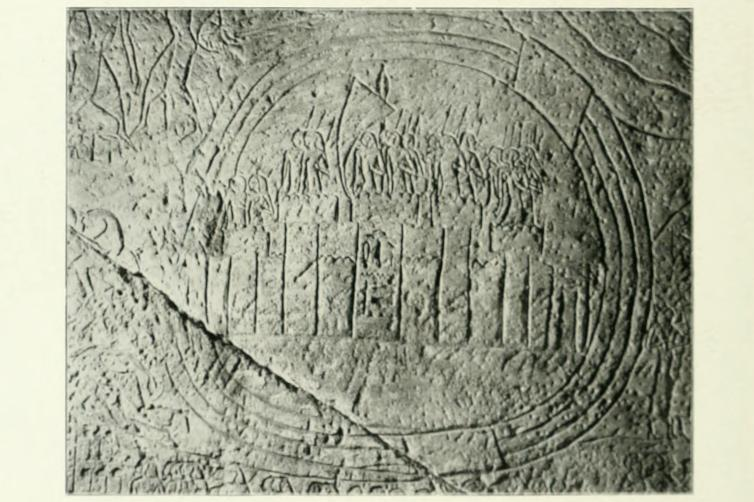

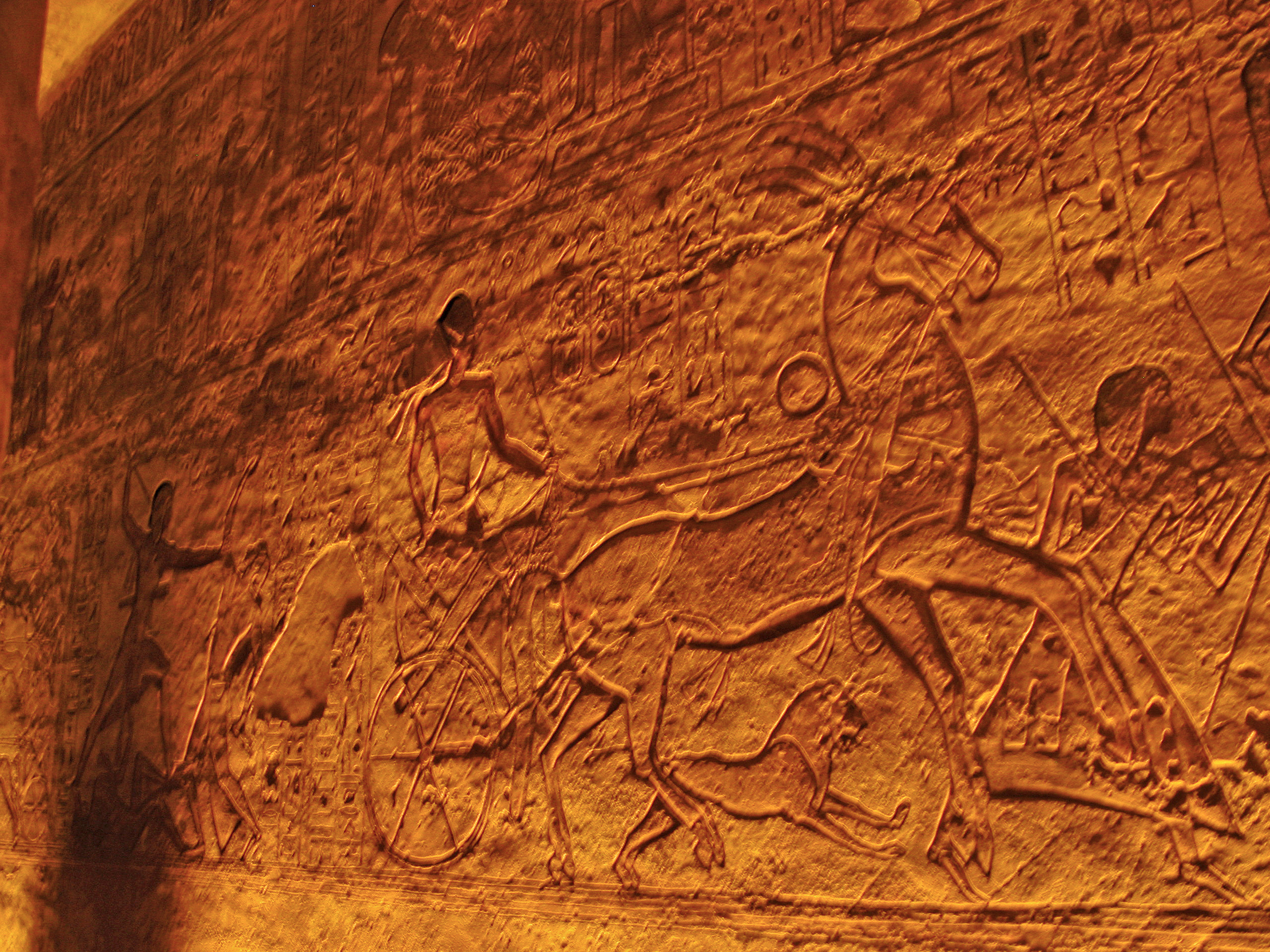

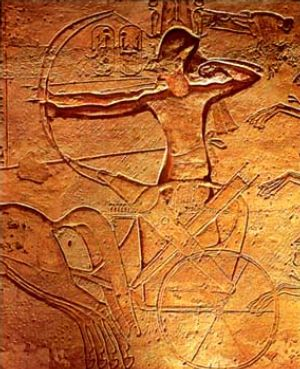

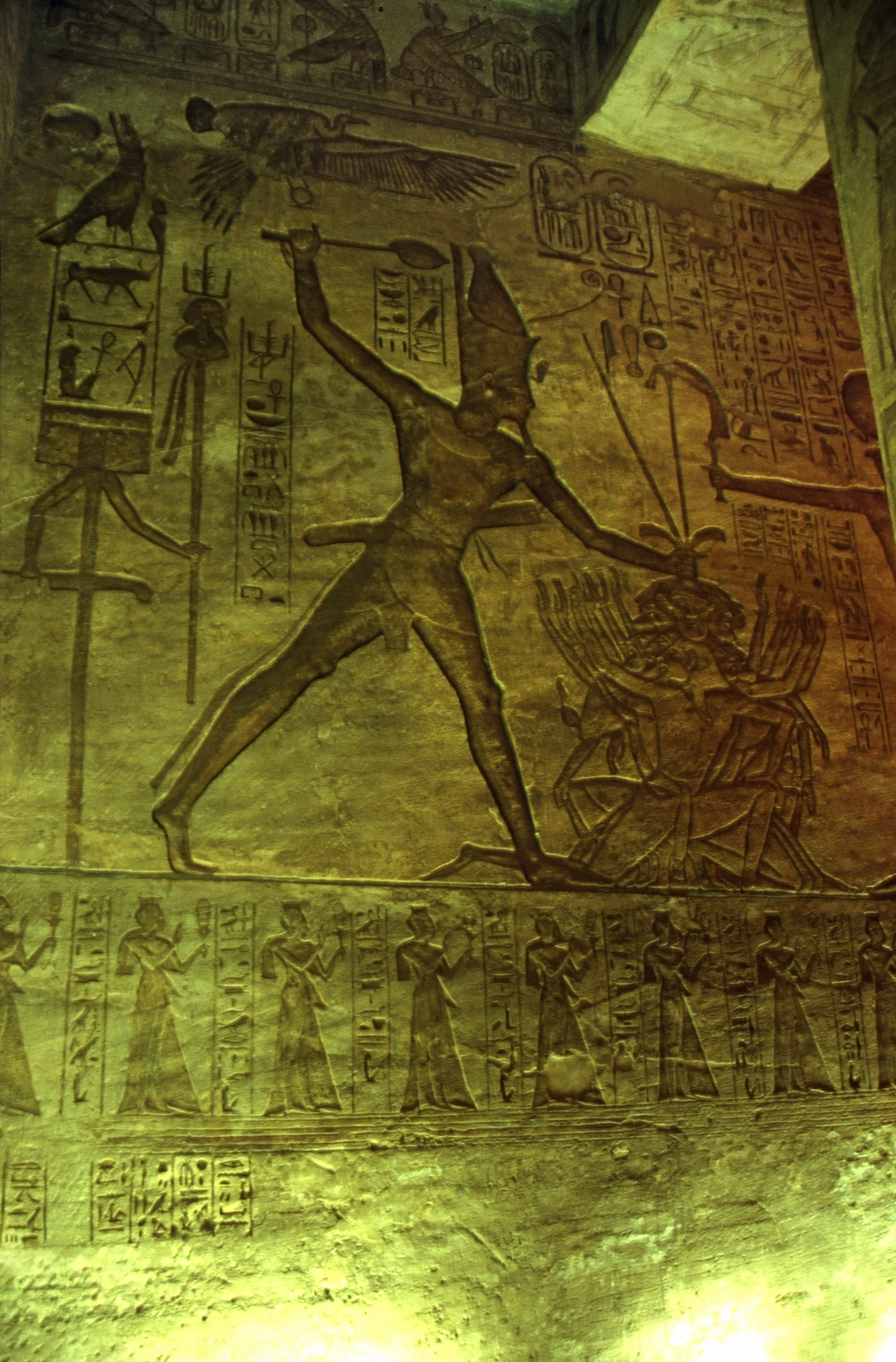

== See also ==
- Egyptian–Hittite peace treaty
- Stelae of Nahr el-Kalb

== Bibliography ==
- Breasted, James Henry (1903). The battle of Kadesh : a study in the earliest known military strategy.
- Ockinga, Boyo (1987), "On the Interpretation of the Kadesh Record", Chronique d'Égypte, 62 (123–124): 38–48, doi:10.1484/J.CDE.2.308740
- Gardiner, A.H. 1960. The Kadesh Inscriptions of Ramesses II. Oxford
- Thomas Charles Hartman (1967). The Kadesh Inscriptions of Ramesses II: An Analysis of the Verbal Patterns of a Ramesside Royal Inscription. Brandeis University.
- Anthony John Spalinger (2002). The Transformation of an Ancient Egyptian Narrative: P. Sallier III and the Battle of Kadesh. Otto Harrassowitz Verlag. ISBN 978-3-447-04355-7.
- Lichtheim, Miriam (1973). "The Kadesh Battle Inscriptions of Ramses II". Ancient Egyptian Literature: The late period. University of California Press. pp. 57–. ISBN 978-0-520-03615-4.

== External websites ==
- Egyptian Accounts of the Battle of Kadesh
