= Djahy =

Ancient Egyptian designation for southern Retjenu (the wider Syrian region)

Djahi, Djahy or Tjahi (Egyptian: ḏhj, ḏꜣhy) was the Egyptian designation for southern Retjenu, the Ancient Egyptian name for the wider Syrian region.

It ran from approximately Ashkelon in Israel to Lebanon and inland as far as Galilee. It was described as the drainage basin of the Jordan River during the battles with Kadesh of the Eighteenth and Nineteenth Dynasties of Egypt.

It was the scene of the Battle of Djahy between Ramesses III and the Sea Peoples.

== See also ==
- Names of the Levant
- Southern Levant
