= Denyen =

Poorly understood ancient Mediterranean group

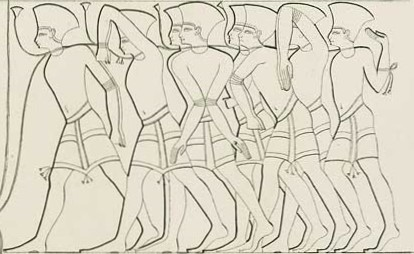
Denyen prisoners on a register from a graphic wall relief on the Second Pylon at Medinet Habu, c. 1150 BC, during the reign of Ramesses III.

The Denyen (Egyptian: dꜣjnjnjw) is purported to be one of the groups constituting the Sea Peoples.

They were raiders associated with the Eastern Mediterranean Dark Ages who attacked Egypt in 1207 BC in alliance with the Libyans and other Sea Peoples, as well as during the reign of Ramesses III. The Twentieth Dynasty of Egypt allowed them to settle in Canaan, which was largely controlled by the Sea Peoples into the 11th century BC.

== Origin ==
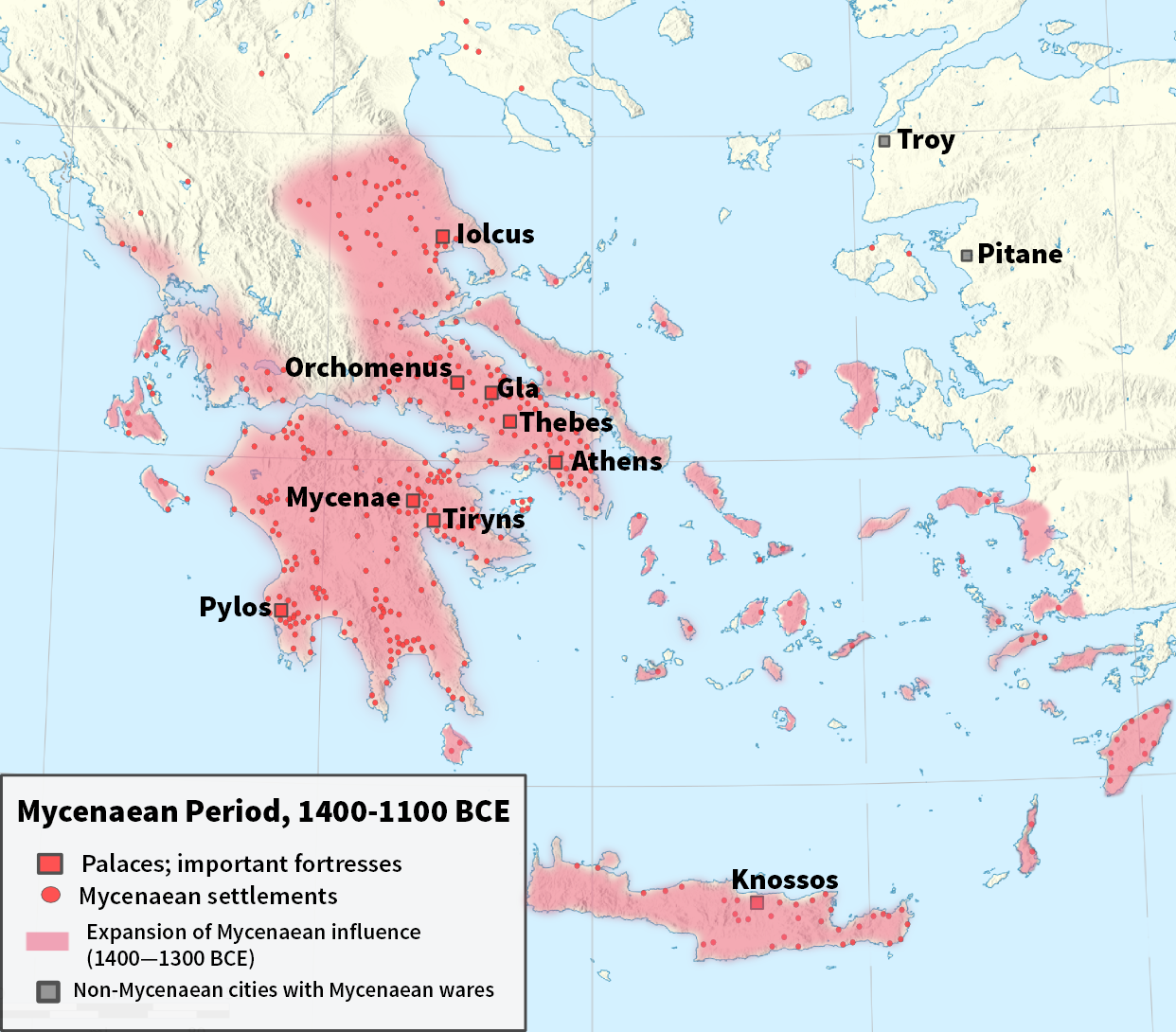
Map of Mycenaean cultural areas, 1400–1100 BC (unearthed sites in red dots).

It has been proposed that the Denyen and Tanaju of the Egyptian records may relate to the Greek ethnonym Danaoi (Ancient Greek: Δαναοί, romanized: Danaoí); also attested in the Homeric epics. The earliest textual reference to Mycenaean Greece is in the Annals of Thutmosis III (c. 1479–1425 BC), which refers to messengers from the king of the Tanaju, c. 1437 BC, offering greeting gifts to the Egyptian king, in order to initiate diplomatic relations, when the latter campaigned in Syria. Tanaju is also listed in an inscription at the Mortuary Temple of Amenhotep III. The latter ruled Egypt in c. 1382–1344 BC. Moreover, a list of the cities and regions of the Tanaju is also mentioned in this inscription; among the cities listed are Mycenae, Nauplion, Kythera, Messenia and the Thebaid (region of Thebes, Greece).

The Denyen have also been identified with the people of Adana in Cilicia, who existed in late Hittite Empire times. They are also believed to have settled in Cyprus. A Hittite report speaks of a Muksus, who also appears in an eighth-century bilingual inscription from Karatepe bilingual stele in Cilicia, which also mentions the king of the "Danunians" (Phoenician: 𐤃𐤍𐤍𐤉𐤌 dnnym). A newly published early Luwian inscription from the notes of James Mellaart also mentions Muksus, but it turned out that this and other texts Mellaart owned were almost certainly forgeries. The kings of Adana are traced from the "house of Mopsos," given in Hieroglyphic Luwian as "Moxos" and in Phoenician as "Mopsos", in the form mps. They were called the Dananiyim. The area also reports a Mopsucrene ("Mopsus' fountain" in Greek) and a Mopsuestia ("Mopsus' hearth" in Greek), also in Cilicia.

It has also been suggested that the Denyen joined with Hebrews to form one of the original Twelve Tribes of Israel. A minority view first suggested by Yigael Yadin attempted to connect the Denyen with the Tribe of Dan, described as remaining on their ships in the early Song of Deborah, contrary to the mainstream view of Israelite history. It was speculated that the Denyen had been taken to Egypt, and subsequently settled between the Caphtorite Philistines and the Tjekker, along the Mediterranean coast with the Tribe of Dan subsequently deriving from them. This theory has not been accepted, however.
