= Tjeker =

Ancient Mediterranean peoples

G47 Z1 k G1 r Z1 T14 A1 Z3 N25
Ṯꜣkꜣr
Tjeker
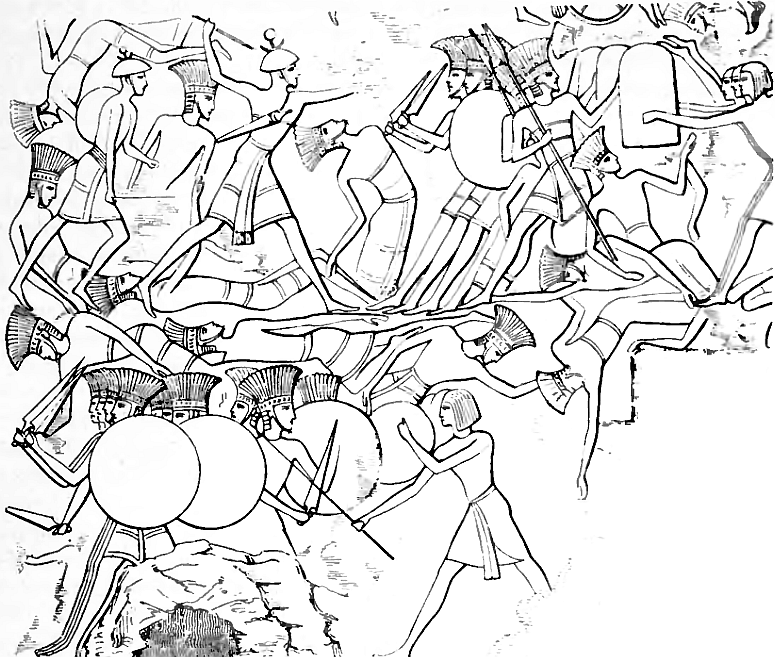
- The Tjeker and Peleset battling the troops of Ramesses III during the Battle of Djahy

The Tjeker or Tjekker (Egyptian: ṯꜣkꜣr or ṯꜣkkꜣr) were one of the Sea Peoples during the Late Bronze Age collapse of the late 13th and early 12th centuries BCE in the Eastern Mediterranean.

== Origin ==
The origins of the Tjeker are uncertain. Their name is an Egyptian exonym, usually romanized as tkr, and expanded as Tjekru or Djekker. There is no consensus on the origins of the name or its etymology, nor what they called themselves. The Tjeker have been identified with the Sicels, who are linked to the Shekelesh, an exonym attributed to another group of Sea Peoples. Flinders Petrie linked "Tjeker", as an ethnonym, to Zakros in eastern Crete. (Note: James Baikie mentioned it on pp. 166, 187 of his book The Sea-Kings of Crete, 2nd edition (Adam and Charles Black, London, 1913). Other scholars have accepted the association.)

Ancient traditions connect the Tjeker with the mythical Teucri, a tribe said to inhabit northwest Anatolia south of Troy. (Note: The identification of Tjeker and Greek Teukroi, Latinized to Teucri, was first made by Lauth in 1867, and was repeated by François Chabas in his Études sur l’Antiquité Historique d’après les sources égyptiennes et les monuments réputés préhistoriques of 1872, according to the Woudhuizen dissertation.) Modern scholars reject any historicity in this tradition.

== History ==
=== Late Bronze Age ===
During the early 20th Dynasty of Egypt, Ramesses III (c. 1190 BCE) defeated the Sea Peoples including the Tjeker in Year 5, Year 8 and Year 12 as depicted at his Mortuary Temple at Medinet Habu. (Note: The campaigns are covered under Sea Peoples and are not repeated here.) One scene shows the Tjeker and Peleset battling the troops of Ramesses III during the Battle of Djahy.

=== Iron Age ===
During the late 20th Dynasty of Egypt, under Ramesses XI (c. 1100 BCE), the Tjeker and its prince Beder are mentioned in the Story of Wenamun. They are thought to be the people who developed the port of Dor in Canaan during the 12th century BCE from a small Bronze Age town to a large city.

==== Settlement at Dor ====
The Tjeker may have conquered the city Dor, on the coast of Canaan near modern Haifa, and turned it into a large, well-fortified city (classified as "Dor XII", fl. c. 1150–1050), the center of a Tjeker kingdom that is confirmed archaeologically in the northern Sharon plain. The city was violently destroyed in the mid-11th century BCE, with the conflagration turning the mud bricks red and depositing a huge layer of ash and debris. Ephraim Stern connects the destruction with the contemporary expansion of the Phoenicians, which was checked by the Philistines further south and the Israelites.

The Tjeker are perhaps one of the few Sea Peoples for whom a ruler's name is recorded — in the 11th-century papyrus account of Wenamun, an Egyptian priest, the ruler of Dor is given as "Beder".

According to Edward Lipiński, the Sicals (Tjekker) of Dor were seamen or mercenaries, and b3-dỉ-r (Beder) was the title of the local governor, a deputy of the king of Tyre.

No mention of the Tjeker is made after the story of Wenamun.
