= The Quarrel of Apophis and Seqenenre =

"The Quarrel of Apophis and Seqenenre" is an ancient Egyptian story. It is fragmentarily attested only in a papyrus copy made by a scribe named Pentawer during the reign of pharaoh Merenptah of the 19th Dynasty. The story is set in an earlier date, towards the end of the Second Intermediate Period: the main characters are the two pharaohs Apepi (Apophis) and Seqenenre Tao, though the text is not historically accurate. In it, 'the Hyksos king Apophis challenges Seqenenre, the local ruler of Thebes, with an adynaton [puzzle] (the hippopotami of Thebes disturb with their cries the sleep of Apophis, who resides at Avaris on the Nile Delta, hundreds of miles away). The end of the tale has been lost, but Seqenenre presumably found a solution, perhaps with the help of a wise counsellor.' It is part of a wider corpus of ancient Egyptian tales of wisdom-contests: it has some similarities, for example, to the much later "Tale of Setne Khamwas and Si-Osire", attested on papyrus in the Roman period.
