= Hyksos =

Asiatic rulers of Dynasty XV of ancient Egypt

Hyksos

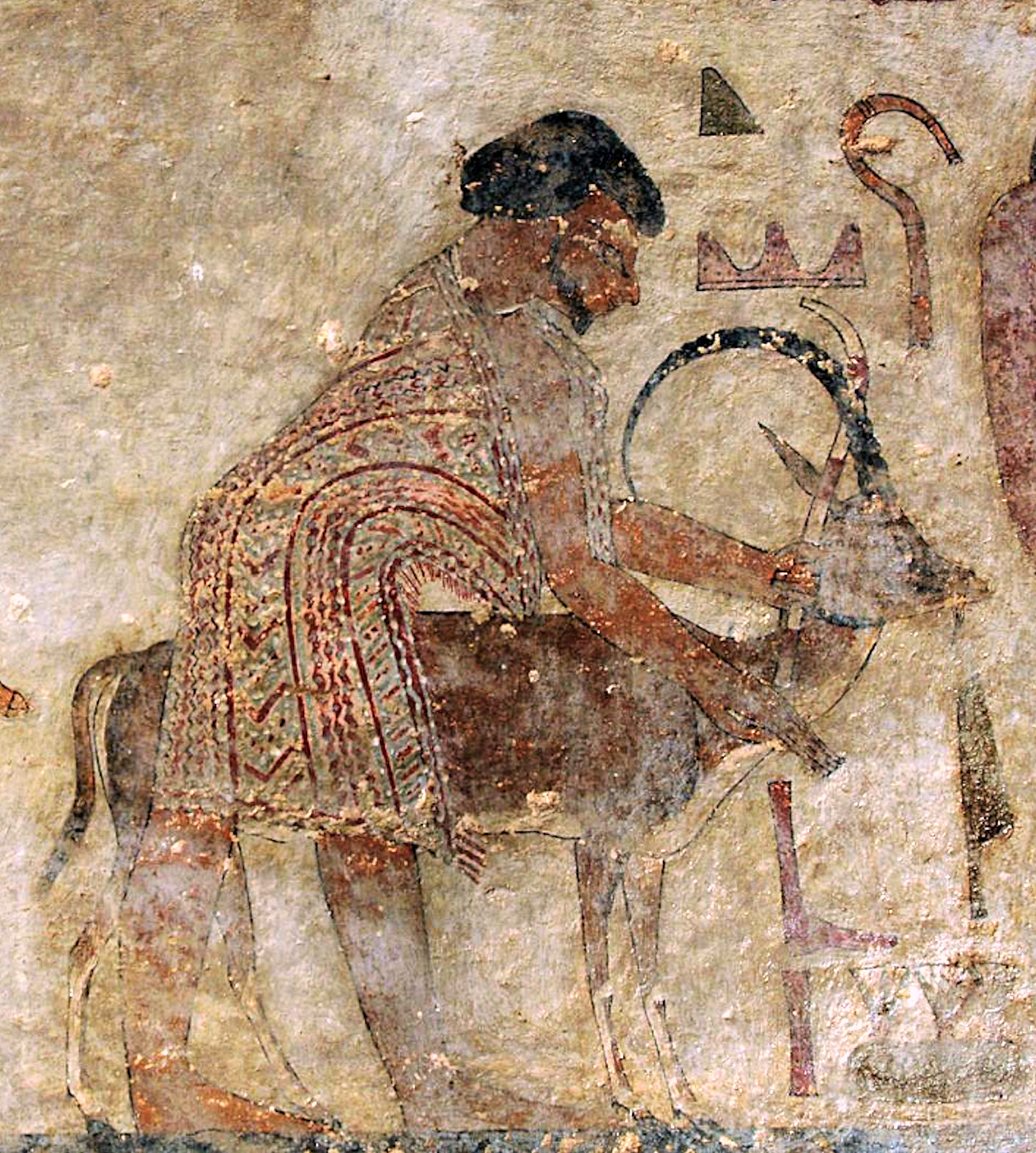
A man described as "Abisha the Hyksos"
(𓋾𓈎𓐰𓈉, ḥqꜣ-ḫꜣswt, Heqa-kasut for "Hyksos"), leading a group of Aamu.
Tomb of Khnumhotep II (c. 1900 BC).
This is one of the earliest known uses of the term "Hyksos".

The Hyksos (/ˈhɪksɒs/; Egyptian ḥqꜣ(w)-ḫꜣswt, Egyptological pronunciation: heqau khasut, 'ruler(s) of foreign lands'), in modern Egyptology, were the kings of the Fifteenth Dynasty of Egypt (fl. c. 1650 – c. 1550 BC). (Note: Approximate dates vary by source. Bietak gives c. 1640–1532 BC, Schneider gives c. 1639–1521 BC, Stiebing gives c. 1630–1530 BC, and Ryholt gives c. 1663-1540 BC) Their seat of power was the city of Avaris in the Nile Delta, from where they ruled over Lower Egypt and Middle Egypt up to Cusae.

In the Aegyptiaca, a history of Egypt written by the Greco-Egyptian priest and historian Manetho in the 3rd century BC, the term Hyksos is used ethnically to designate people of probable West Semitic, Levantine origin. While Manetho portrayed the Hyksos as invaders and oppressors, this interpretation is questioned in modern Egyptology. Instead, Hyksos rule might have been preceded by groups of Canaanite peoples who gradually settled in the Nile Delta from the end of the Twelfth Dynasty onwards and who may have seceded from the crumbling and unstable Egyptian control at some point during the Thirteenth Dynasty.

The Hyksos period marks the first in which foreign rulers ruled Egypt. Many details of their rule, such as the true extent of their kingdom and even the names and order of their kings, remain uncertain. The Hyksos practiced many Levantine or Canaanite customs alongside Egyptian ones. They have been credited with introducing several technological innovations to Egypt, such as the horse and chariot, as well as the khopesh (sickle sword) and the composite bow, a theory which is disputed.

The Hyksos did not control all of Egypt. They coexisted with the Sixteenth and Seventeenth Dynasties, which were based in Thebes. Warfare between the Hyksos and the pharaohs of the late Seventeenth Dynasty eventually culminated in the defeat of the Hyksos by Ahmose I, who founded the Eighteenth Dynasty of Egypt. In the following centuries, the Egyptians would portray the Hyksos as bloodthirsty and oppressive foreign rulers.

== Name ==
=== Etymology ===
Hyksos in hieroglyphs
HqA q xAst HqA q xAst Z2
ḥqꜣ-ḫꜣsw / ḥqꜣw-ḫꜣswt,
"heqau khasut" (Note: Spelling of the hieroglyphs in sources describing the archaeological record of the historical Hyksos: first set of characters is the singular, as appearing in Abisha the Hyksos in the tomb of Khnumhotep II, c.1900 BC. The second set is in the plural, as appears in the inscriptions of known Hyksos rulers Sakir-Har, Semqen, Khyan and Aperanat.)
"Hyksos"
Ruler(s) of the foreign countries
- Greek: Hyksos (Ὑκσώς); Hykussos (Ὑκουσσώς)
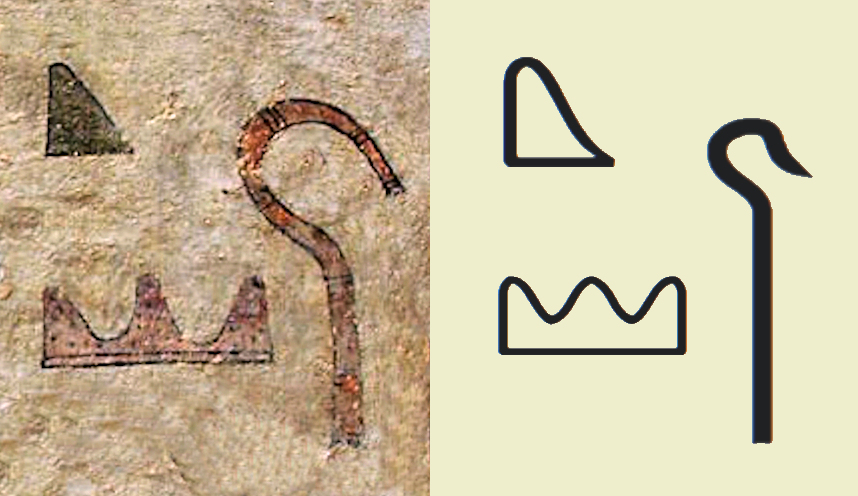
- Standard characters for "Hyksos" in the label for "Abisha the Hyksos" in the tomb of Khnumhotep II, c. 1900 BC. The crook (𓋾, ḥqꜣ) means "ruler", the hill (𓈎) is a phonetic complement q/ḳ to 𓋾 while 𓈉 stands for (foreign) "country", pronounced ḫꜣst, plural ḫꜣswt. The sign 𓏥 marks the plural.

The term "Hyksos" is derived, via the Greek Ὑκσώς (Hyksôs), from the Egyptian expression 𓋾𓈎𓐰𓈉 (ḥqꜣ-ḫꜣswt or ḥqꜣw-ḫꜣswt, "heqau khasut"), meaning "rulers [of] foreign lands". The Greek form is likely a textual corruption of an earlier Ὑκουσσώς (Hykoussôs).

The first century Jewish historian Josephus gives the name as meaning "shepherd kings" or "captive shepherds" in his Contra Apion (Against Apion), where he describes the Hyksos as Jews as they appeared in the Hellenistic Egyptian historian Manetho. "Their race bore the generic name of Hycsos, which means 'king-shepherds'. For hyc in the sacred language denotes 'king' and sos in the common dialect means 'shepherd' or 'shepherds'; the combined words form Hycsos. Some say that they were Arabians."

Josephus's rendition may arise from a later Egyptian pronunciation of ḥqꜣ-ḫꜣswt as ḥqꜣ-šꜣsw, which was then understood to mean "lord of shepherds." It is unclear if this translation was found in Manetho; an Armenian translation of an epitome of Manetho given by the late antique historian Eusebius gives the correct translation of "foreign kings".

=== Use ===
"It is now commonly accepted in academic publications that the term Ḥqꜣ-Ḫꜣswt refers only to the individual foreign rulers of the late Second Intermediate Period," especially of the Fifteenth Dynasty, rather than a people. However, Josephus used it as an ethnic term. (Note: "Two separate misconceptions persist, both in the scholarship and more popular works, surrounding the word "Hyksos." The first is that this term is the name of a defined and relatively large population group (see below), when in fact it is only a royal title held exclusively by individual rulers. Any standalone use of the word "Hyksos" in the following article refers specifically to the foreign kings of the 15th Dynasty." "[Josephus] also misrepresents the Hyksos as a population group (ethnos) as opposed to a dynasty." "Flavius Josephus used the designation "Hyksos" incorrectly as a kind of ethnic term for people of foreign origin who seized power in Egypt for a certain period. In this sense, for the sake of convenience, it is also used in the title and section headings of the present article. One should never forget, however, that, strictly spoken, the "Hyksos" were only the kings of the Fifteenth Dynasty, and of simultaneous minor dynasties, who took the title ḥqꜣw-ḫꜣswt.") Its use to refer to the population persists in some academic papers.

In Ancient Egypt, the term "Hyksos" (ḥqꜣ-ḫꜣswt) was also used to refer to various Nubian and especially Asiatic rulers both before and after the Fifteenth Dynasty. It was used at least since the Sixth Dynasty of Egypt (c. 2345–2181 BC) to designate chieftains from the Syria-Palestine area. One of its earliest recorded uses is found c. 1900 BC in the tomb of Khnumhotep II of the Twelfth Dynasty to label a nomad or Canaanite ruler named "Abisha the Hyksos" (using the standard 𓋾𓈎𓐰𓈉, ḥqꜣ-ḫꜣswt, "Heqa-kasut" for "Hyksos").

Scarabs of Hyksos kings

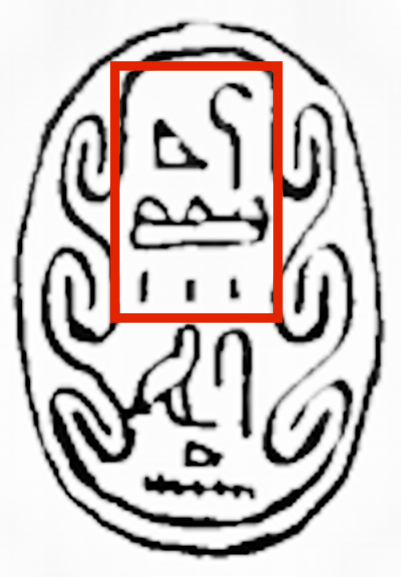
"Semqen the Hyksos"

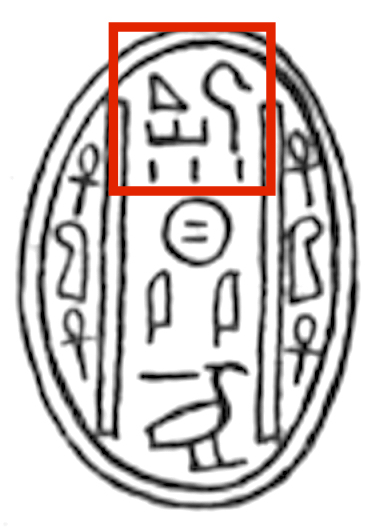
"Khyan the Hyksos"

Scarabs of Hyksos kings, with "Hyksos" highlighted.

Based on the use of the name in a Hyksos inscription of Sakir-Har from Avaris, the name was used by the Hyksos as a title for themselves. However, Kim Ryholt argues that "Hyksos" was not an official title of the rulers of the Fifteenth Dynasty, and is never encountered together with royal titulary, only appearing as the title in the case of Sakir-Har. According to Ryholt, "Hyksos" was a generic term encountered separately from royal titulary, and in regnal lists after the end of the Fifteenth Dynasty itself. However, Vera Müller writes: "Considering that S-k-r-h-r is also mentioned with three names of the traditional Egyptian titulary (Horus name, Golden Falcon name and Two Ladies name) on the same monument, this argument is somehow strange." Danielle Candelora and Manfred Bietak also argue that the Hyksos used the title officially. All other texts in the Egyptian language do not call the Hyksos by this name, instead referring to them as Asiatics (ꜥꜣmw), with the possible exception of the Turin King List in a hypothetical reconstruction from a fragment. The title is not attested for the Hyksos king Apepi, possibly indicating an "increased adoption of Egyptian decorum". The names of Hyksos rulers in the Turin list are without the royal cartouche and have the throwstick "foreigners" determinative.

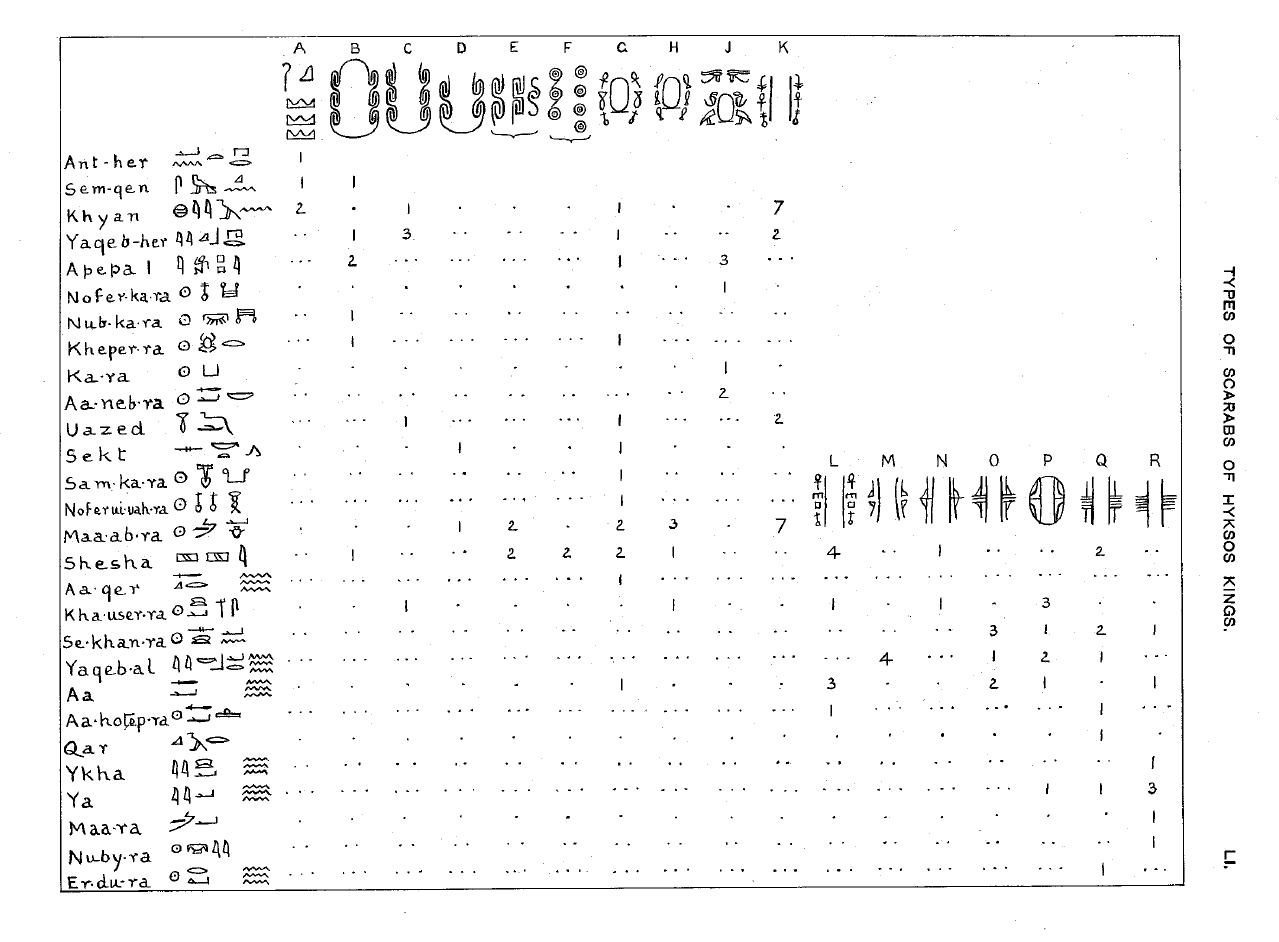

Scarabs also attest the use of this title for pharaohs usually assigned to the Fourteenth or Sixteenth Dynasty of Egypt, who are sometimes called "'lesser' Hyksos." The Theban Seventeenth Dynasty of Egypt is also given the title in some versions of Manetho, a fact which Bietak attributes to textual corruption. In the Twenty-fifth Dynasty of Egypt and during the Ptolemaic Period, the term Hyksos was adopted as a personal title and epithet by several pharaohs or high Egyptian officials, including the Theban official Mentuemhat, Philip III of Macedon, and Ptolemy XIII. It was also used on the tomb of Egyptian grand priest Petosiris at Tuna el-Gebel in 300 BC to designate the Persian ruler Artaxerxes III, although it is unknown if Artaxerxes adopted this title for himself.

== Origins ==
=== Ancient historians ===
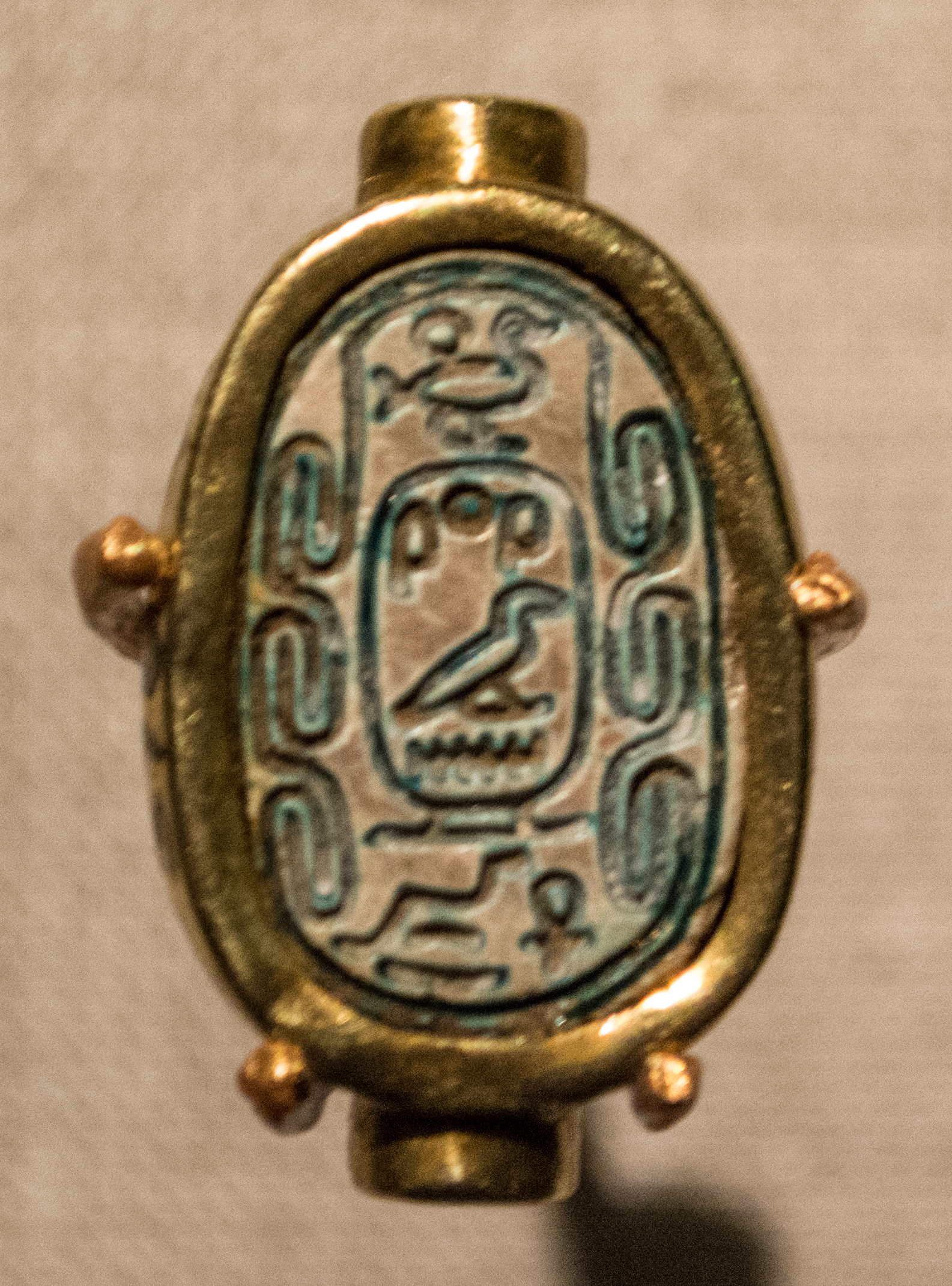
Blue glazed steatite scarab in a gold mount, with the cartouche of Hyksos ruler Khyan: N5 G39 < x i i A n > S34 I10 t N17 - "Son of Ra, Khyan, living forever!"

In his epitome of Manetho, Josephus connected the Hyksos with the Jews, but he also calls them Arabs. In their own epitomes of Manetho, the Late antique historians Sextus Julius Africanus and Eusebius say that the Hyksos came from Phoenicia. Until the excavation and discovery of Tell El-Dab'a (the site of the Hyksos capital Avaris) in 1966, historians relied on these accounts for the Hyksos period.

=== Modern historians ===
Material finds at Tell El-Dab'a indicate that the Hyksos originated in the Levant. The Hyksos' personal names indicate that they spoke a Western Semitic language and "may be called for convenience sake Canaanites."

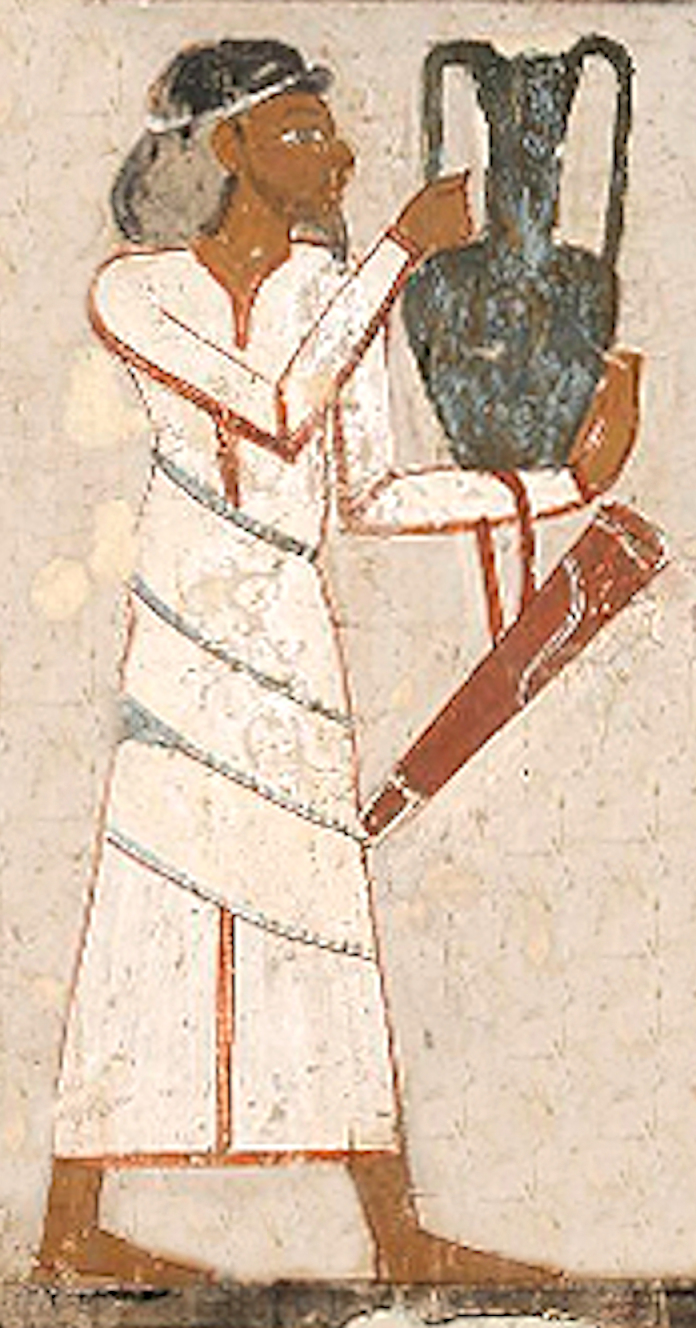
A Retjenu, associated with the Hyksos in some Egyptian inscriptions.

Kamose, the last king of the Theban Seventeenth Dynasty, refers to Apepi as a "Chieftain of Retjenu" in a stela that implies a Levantine background for this Hyksos king. According to Anna-Latifa Mourad, the Egyptian application of the term ꜥꜣmw to the Hyksos could indicate a range of backgrounds, including newly arrived Levantines or people of mixed Levantine-Egyptian origin.

Due to the work of Manfred Bietak, which found similarities in architecture, ceramics and burial practices, scholars currently favor a northern Levantine origin of the Hyksos. Based particularly on temple architecture, Bietak argues for strong parallels between the religious practices of the Hyksos at Avaris with those of the area around Byblos, Ugarit, Alalakh and Tell Brak, defining the "spiritual home" of the Hyksos as "in northernmost Syria and northern Mesopotamia". The connection of the Hyksos to Retjenu also suggests a northern Levantine origin: "Theoretically, it is feasible to deduce that the early Hyksos, as the later Apophis, were of elite ancestry from Rṯnw, a toponym [...] cautiously linked with the Northern Levant and the northern region of the Southern Levant." Aaron Burke argues that the material culture of the Hyksos strongly suggests Amorite origins.

Earlier arguments that the Hyksos names might be Hurrian have been rejected, while early-twentieth-century proposals that the Hyksos were Indo-Europeans "fitted European dreams of Indo-European supremacy, now discredited." Some have suggested that Hyksos or a part of them was of Maryannu origins as evident by their use and introduction of chariots and horses into Egypt. However, this theory has also been rejected by modern scholarship.

== History ==
=== Early contacts between Egypt and the Levant ===
Procession of the Aamu
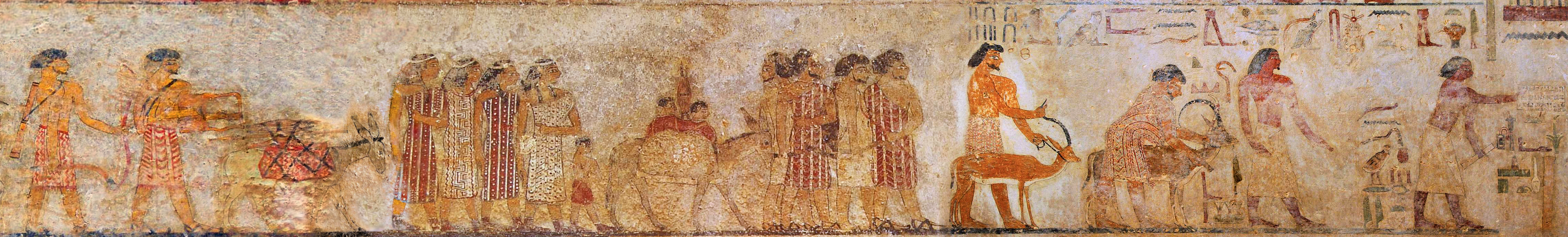
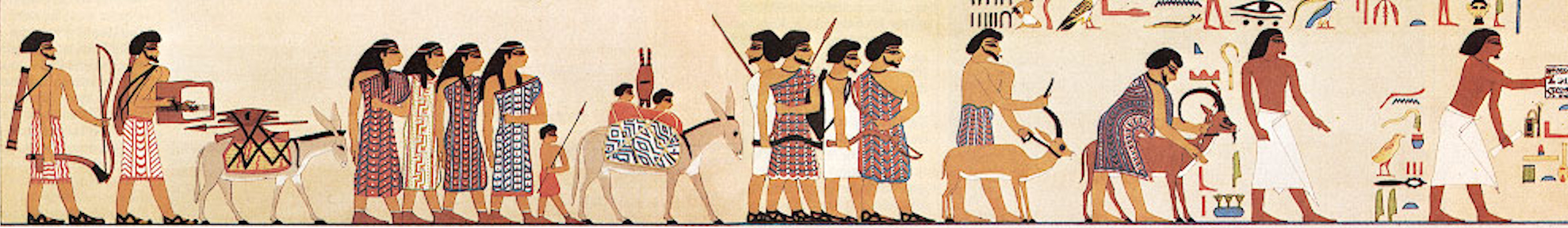
A group of West Asiatic foreigners, possibly Canaanites, labelled as Aamu (ꜥꜣmw), including the leading man with a Nubian ibex labelled as Abisha the Hyksos (𓋾𓈎𓐰𓈉, ḥqꜣ-ḫꜣsw, Heqa-kasut for "Hyksos"). Tomb of 12th-dynasty official Khnumhotep II, at Beni Hasan (c. 1890 BC).

Historical records suggest that Semitic people and Egyptians had contacts at all periods of Egypt's history. The MacGregor plaque, an early Egyptian tablet dating to 3000 BC records "The first occasion of striking the East", with the picture of Pharaoh Den smiting a Western Asiatic enemy.

During the reign of Senusret II, c. 1890 BC, parties of Western Asiatic foreigners visiting the Pharaoh with gifts are recorded, as in the tomb paintings of 12th-dynasty official Khnumhotep II. These foreigners, possibly Canaanites or nomads, are labelled as Aamu (ꜥꜣmw), including the leading man with a Nubian ibex labelled as Abisha the Hyksos (Ancient Egyptian: 𓋾𓈎𓐰𓈉, romanized: ḥqꜣ-ḫꜣsw, Heqa-kasut for "Hyksos"), the first known instance of the name "Hyksos".

Soon after, the Sebek-khu Stele, dated to the reign of Senusret III (reign: 1878–1839 BC), records the earliest known Egyptian military campaign in the Levant. The text reads "His Majesty proceeded northward to overthrow the Asiatics. His Majesty reached a foreign country of which the name was Sekmem (...) Then Sekmem fell, together with the wretched Retenu", where Sekmem (s-k-m-m) is thought to be Shechem and "Retenu" or "Retjenu" are associated with ancient Syria.

=== Background and arrival in Egypt ===
The only ancient account of the whole Hyksos period is by the Hellenistic Egyptian historian Manetho, who exists only as quoted by others. As recorded by Josephus, Manetho describes the beginning of Hyksos rule thus:

A people of ignoble origin from the east, whose coming was unforeseen, had the audacity to invade the country, which they mastered by main force without difficulty or even battle. Having overpowered the chiefs, they then savagely burnt the cities, razed the temples of the gods to the ground, and treated the whole native population with the utmost cruelty, massacring some, and carrying off the wives and children of others into slavery (Contra Apion I.75-77).

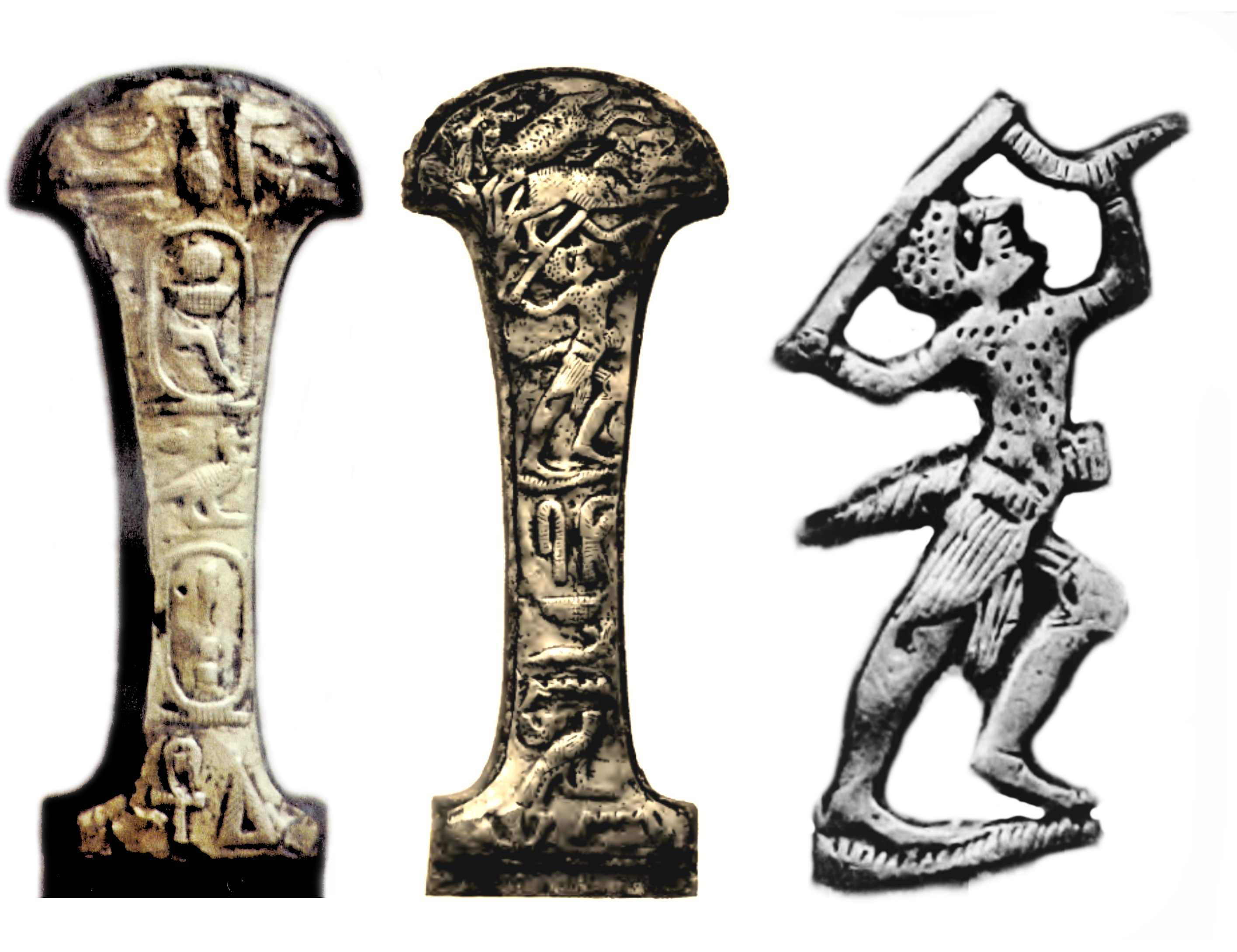
Electrum dagger handle of a soldier of Hyksos pharaoh Apepi, illustrating the soldier hunting with a short bow and sword. Inscriptions: "The perfect god, the lord of the two lands, Nebkhepeshre Apepi" and "Follower of his lord Nehemen", found at a burial at Saqqara. Now at the Luxor Museum.

Manetho's invasion narrative is "nowadays rejected by most scholars." It is likely that more recent foreign invasions of Egypt influenced him. Instead, it appears that the establishment of Hyksos rule was mostly peaceful and did not involve an invasion of an entirely foreign population. Archaeology shows a continuous Asiatic presence at Avaris for over 150 years before the beginning of Hyksos rule, with gradual Canaanite settlement beginning there c. 1800 BC during the Twelfth Dynasty. Strontium isotope analysis of the inhabitants of Middle Kingdom and Second Intermediate Period Avaris also dismissed the invasion model in favor of a migration one. Contrary to the model of a foreign invasion, the study did not find more males moving into the region, but instead found a sex bias towards females, with a high proportion of 77% of females being non-locals.

Manfred Bietak argues that Hyksos "should be understood within a repetitive pattern of the attraction of Egypt for western Asiatic population groups that came in search of a living in the country, especially the Delta, since prehistoric times." He notes that Egypt had long depended on the Levant for expertise in areas of shipbuilding and seafaring, with possible depictions of Asiatic shipbuilders being found from reliefs from the Sixth Dynasty ruler Sahure. The Twelfth Dynasty of Egypt is known to have had many Asiatic immigrants serving as soldiers, household or temple serfs, and various other jobs. Avaris in the Nile Delta attracted many Asiatic immigrants in its role as a hub of international trade and seafaring.

The final powerful pharaoh of the Egyptian Thirteenth Dynasty was Sobekhotep IV, who died around 1725 BC, after which Egypt appears to have splintered into various kingdoms, including one based at Avaris ruled by the Fourteenth Dynasty. Based on their names, this dynasty was already primarily of West Asian origin. After an event in which their palace was burned, the Fourteenth Dynasty would be replaced by the Hyksos Fifteenth Dynasty, which would establish "loose control over northern Egypt by intimidation or force," thus greatly expanding the area under Avaris's control.

Kim Ryholt argues that the Fifteenth Dynasty invaded and displaced the Fourteenth. However, Alexander Ilin-Tomich argues that this is "not sufficiently substantiated." Bietak interprets a stela of Neferhotep III to indicate that Egypt was overrun by roving mercenaries around the time of the Hyksos ascension to power.

=== Kingdom ===
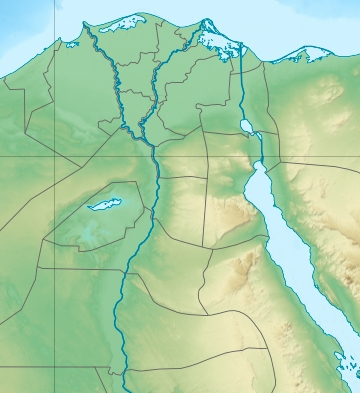
Key Sites of the Second Intermediate Period, in Northern Egypt. West Semitic in red; Egyptian in blue.

The length of time the Hyksos ruled is unclear. The fragmentary Turin King List says that there were six Hyksos kings who collectively ruled 108 years. However, in 2018, Kim Ryholt proposed a new reading of as many as 149 years, while Thomas Schneider proposed a length between 160 and 180 years. In 2024, Manfred Bietak defended the reading of the Turin King List as only showing a reign of 108 years, arguing that the longer reign periods were incompatible with the archaeology of the Hyksos capital, Avaris. Bietak stressed that:

"If we use the average phase estimate of 30-32 years at Tell el-Dab'a (ie. Avaris) for the Hyksos Period, which includes half of Phase E/2 and the Phases E/1, D/3 and D/2, we arrive at 105-112 years. This aligns closely to the 108 years read by Farina and von Beckerath for the Hyksos Period. In contrast, the more recently proposed estimates of 140-149, 160-169, and 180-189 years result in averages of 40, 42.5, 46, 48, 51.5, and 54 years for each phase. These estimates are incompatible with the other phases of this stratigraphy as they would require significant compressions of the overall period to fit into the timeframes established by the fixed points. Such compression would result in a completely one-sided entity with elongated reigns within an unstable period....Our model for the chronology of the Hyksos period, based on the stratigraphy at Tell el-Dab'a, makes the elongation of the Hyksos Period to 140-189 years highly unlikely, and in the higher realm, absolutely impossible."

The rule of the Hyksos overlaps with that of the native Egyptian pharaohs of the Sixteenth and Seventeenth Dynasties, better known as the Second Intermediate Period. The area under direct control of the Hyksos was probably limited to the eastern Nile delta. Their capital city was Avaris at a fork on the now-dry Pelusiac branch of the Nile. Memphis may have also been an important administrative center, although the nature of any Hyksos presence there remains unclear.

According to Anna-Latifa Mourad, other sites with likely Levantine populations or strong Levantine connections in the Delta include Tell Farasha and Tell el-Maghud, located between Tell Basta and Avaris, El-Khata'na, southwest of Avaris, and Inshas. The increased prosperity of Avaris may have attracted more Levantines to settle in the eastern Delta. Kom el-Hisn, at the edge of the Western Delta, shows Near Eastern goods but individuals mostly buried in an Egyptian style, which Mourad takes to mean that they were most likely Egyptians heavily influenced by Levantine traditions or, more likely, Egyptianized Levantines. The site of Tell Basta (Bubastis), at the confluence of the Pelusiac and Tanitic branches of the Nile, contains monuments to the Hyksos kings Khyan and Apepi, but little other evidence of Levantine habitation. Tell el-Habwa (Tjaru), located on a branch of the Nile near the Sinai, also shows evidence of non-Egyptian presence. However, most of the population appears to have been Egyptian or Egyptianized Levantines. Tell El-Habwa would have provided Avaris with grain and trade goods.

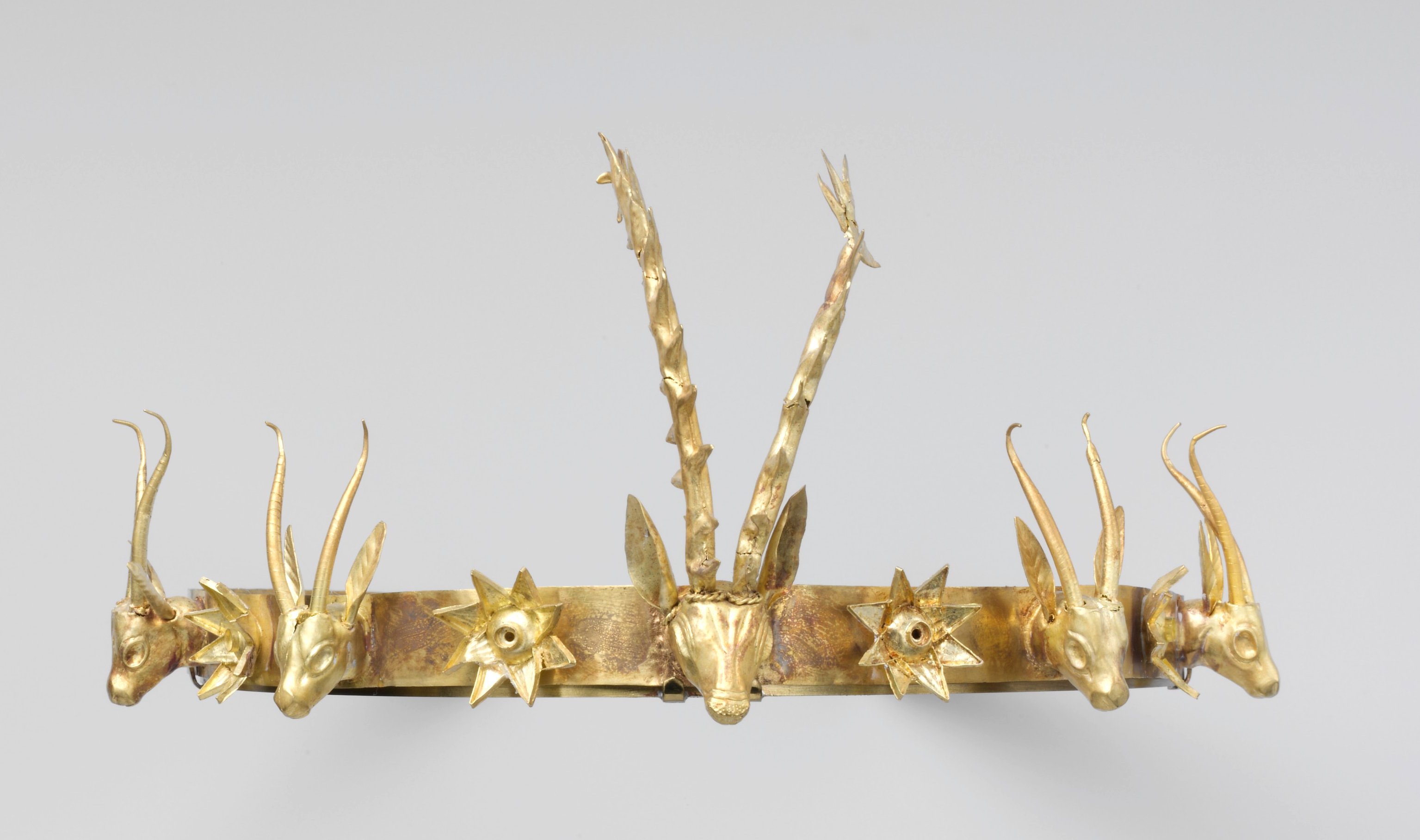
Near-eastern inspired diadem with heads of gazelles and a stag between stars or flowers, belonging to an elite lady discovered at a tomb at Tell el-Dab'a (Avaris) dating from the late Hyksos period (1648–1540 BC). Now at the Metropolitan Museum of Art.

In the Wadi Tumilat, Tell el-Maskhuta shows a great deal of Levantine pottery and an occupation history closely correlated to the Fifteenth Dynasty, nearby Tell el-Rataba and Tell el-Sahaba show possible Hyksos-style burials and occupation, Tell el-Yahudiyah, located between Memphis and the Wadi Tumilat, contains a large earthwork that the Hyksos may have built, as well as evidence of Levantine burials from as early as the Thirteenth Dynasty, as well as characteristic Hyksos-era pottery known as Tell el-Yahudiyeh Ware The Hyksos settlements in the Wadi Tumilat would have provided access to Sinai, the southern Levant, and possibly the Red Sea.

The sites Tell el-Kabir, Tell Yehud, Tell Fawziya, and Tell Geziret el-Faras are noted by scholars other than Mourad to contain "elements of 'Hyksos culture'", but there is no published archaeological material for them.

The Hyksos claimed to be rulers of both Lower and Upper Egypt; however, their southern border was marked at Hermopolis and Cusae. Some objects might suggest a Hyksos presence in Upper Egypt, but they may have been Theban war booty or attest simply to short-term raids, trade, or diplomatic contact. The nature of Hyksos control over the region of Thebes remains unclear. Most likely Hyksos rule covered the area from Middle Egypt to southern Palestine. Older scholarship believed, due to the distribution of Hyksos goods with the names of Hyksos rulers in places such as Baghdad and Knossos, that Hyksos had ruled a vast empire, but it seems more likely to have been the result of diplomatic gift exchange and far-flung trade networks.

=== Wars with the Seventeenth Dynasty ===
The conflict between Thebes and the Hyksos is known exclusively from pro-Theban sources, and it is not easy to construct a chronology. These sources propagandistically portray the conflict as a war of national liberation. This perspective was formerly taken by scholars as well but is no longer thought to be accurate.

Hostilities between the Hyksos and the Theban Seventeenth Dynasty appear to have begun during the reign of Theban king Seqenenra Taa. Seqenenra Taa's mummy shows that he was killed by several blows of an axe to the head, apparently in battle with the Hyksos. It is unclear why hostilities may have started. The much later fragmentary New Kingdom tale The Quarrel of Apophis and Seqenenre blames the Hyksos ruler Apepi/Apophis for initiating the conflict by demanding that Seqenenre Tao remove a pool of hippopotamuses near Thebes. However, this is a satire on the Egyptian story-telling genre of the "king's novel" rather than a historical text. A contemporary inscription at Wadi el Hôl may also refer to hostilities between Seqenenra and Apepi.

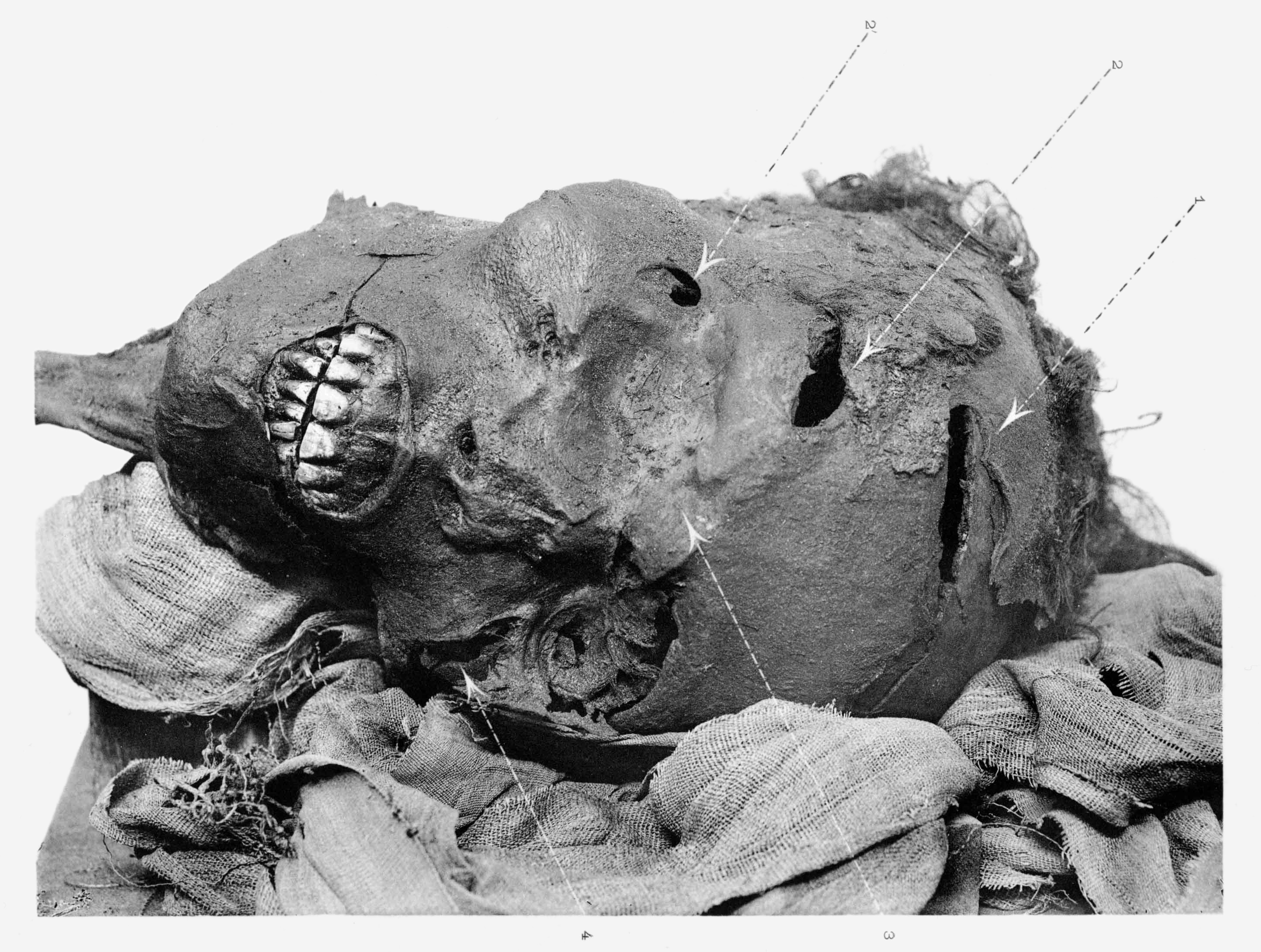
Mummified head of Seqenenre Tao, bearing axe wounds. The common theory is that he died in a battle against the Hyksos.

Three years later, c. 1542 BC, Seqenenre Tao's successor Kamose initiated a campaign against several cities loyal to the Hyksos, the account of which is preserved on three monumental stelae set up at Karnak. The first of the three, Carnarvon Tablet includes a complaint by Kamose about the divided and occupied state of Egypt:

To what effect do I perceive it, my might, while a ruler is in Avaris and another in Kush, I sitting joined with an Asiatic and a Nubian, each man having his (own) portion of this Egypt, sharing the land with me. There is no passing him as far as Memphis, the water of Egypt. He has possession of Hermopolis, and no man can rest, being deprived by the levies of the Setiu. I shall engage in battle with him and I shall slit his body, for my intention is to save Egypt, striking the Asiatics.

Following a common literary device, Kamose's advisors are portrayed as trying to dissuade the king, who attacks anyway. He recounts his destruction of the city of Nefrusy as well as several other cities loyal to the Hyksos. On a second stele, Kamose claims to have captured Avaris, but returned to Thebes after capturing a messenger between Apepi and the king of Kush. Kamose appears to have died soon afterward (c. 1540 BC).

Ahmose I continued the war against the Hyksos, most likely conquering Memphis, Tjaru, and Heliopolis early in his reign, the latter two of which are mentioned in an entry of the Rhind mathematical papyrus. Knowledge of Ahmose I's campaigns against the Hyksos mostly comes from the tomb of Ahmose, son of Ebana, who gives a first-person account claiming that Ahmose I sacked Avaris: "Then there was fighting in Egypt to the south of this town [Avaris], and I carried off a man as a living captive. I went down into the water—for he was captured on the city side—and crossed the water carrying him. [...] Then Avaris was despoiled, and I brought spoil from there.

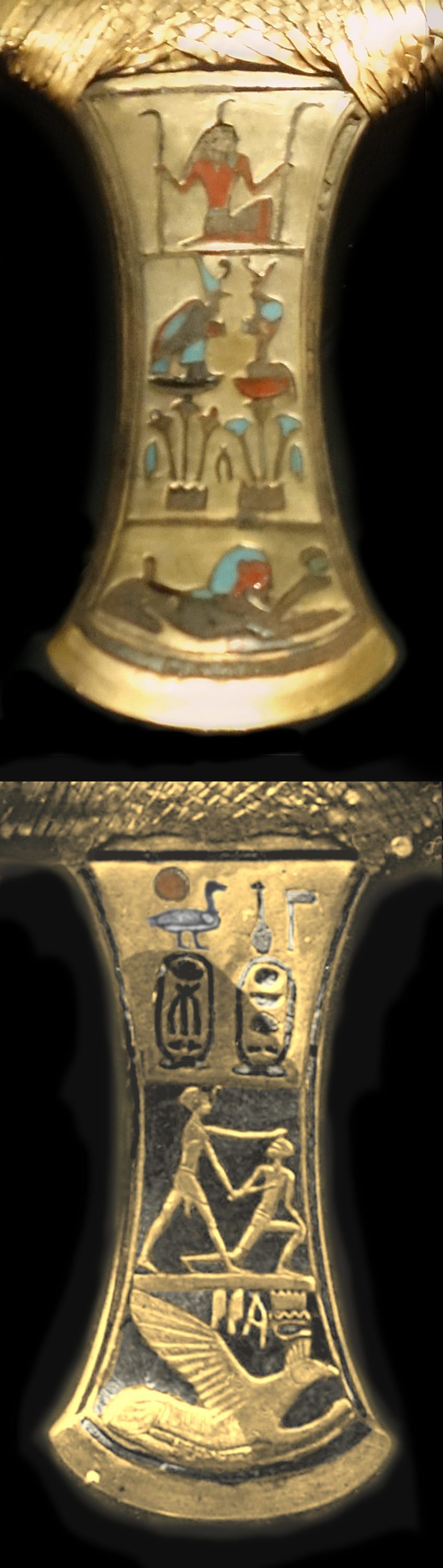
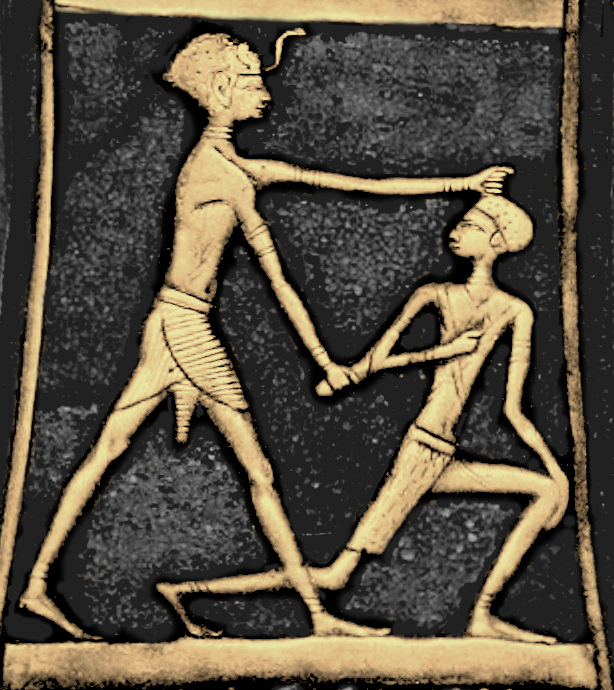
Pharaoh Ahmose I (ruled c. 1549–1524 BC) slaying a probable Hyksos. Detail of a ceremonial axe in the name of Ahmose I, treasure of Queen Ahhotep II. Inscription "Ahmose, beloved of (the War God) Montu". Luxor Museum

Thomas Schneider places the conquest in year 18 of Ahmose's reign. However, excavations of Tell El-Dab'a (Avaris) show no widespread destruction of the city, which instead seems to have been abandoned by the Hyksos. Manetho, as recorded in Josephus, states that the Hyksos were allowed to leave after concluding a treaty:

Thoumosis ... invested the walls [of Avaris] with an army of 480,000 men, and endeavoured to reduce [the Hyksos] to submission by siege. Despairing of achieving his object, he concluded a treaty, under which [the Hyksos] were all to evacuate Egypt and go whither they would unmolested. Upon these terms no fewer than two hundred and forty thousand, entire households with their possessions, left Egypt and traversed the desert to Syria. (Contra Apion I.88-89)

Although Manetho indicates that the Hyksos population was expelled to the Levant, there is no archaeological evidence for this, and Manfred Bietak argues based on archaeological finds throughout Egypt that it is likely that numerous Asiatics were resettled in other locations in Egypt as artisans and craftsmen. Many may have remained at Avaris, as pottery and scarabs with typical "Hyksos" forms continued to be produced uninterrupted throughout the Eastern Delta. Canaanite cults also continued to be worshiped at Avaris.

Following the capture of Avaris, Ahmose, son of Ebana, records that Ahmose I captured Sharuhen (possibly Tell el-Ajjul), which some scholars argue was a city in Canaan under Hyksos control.

== Rule and administration ==
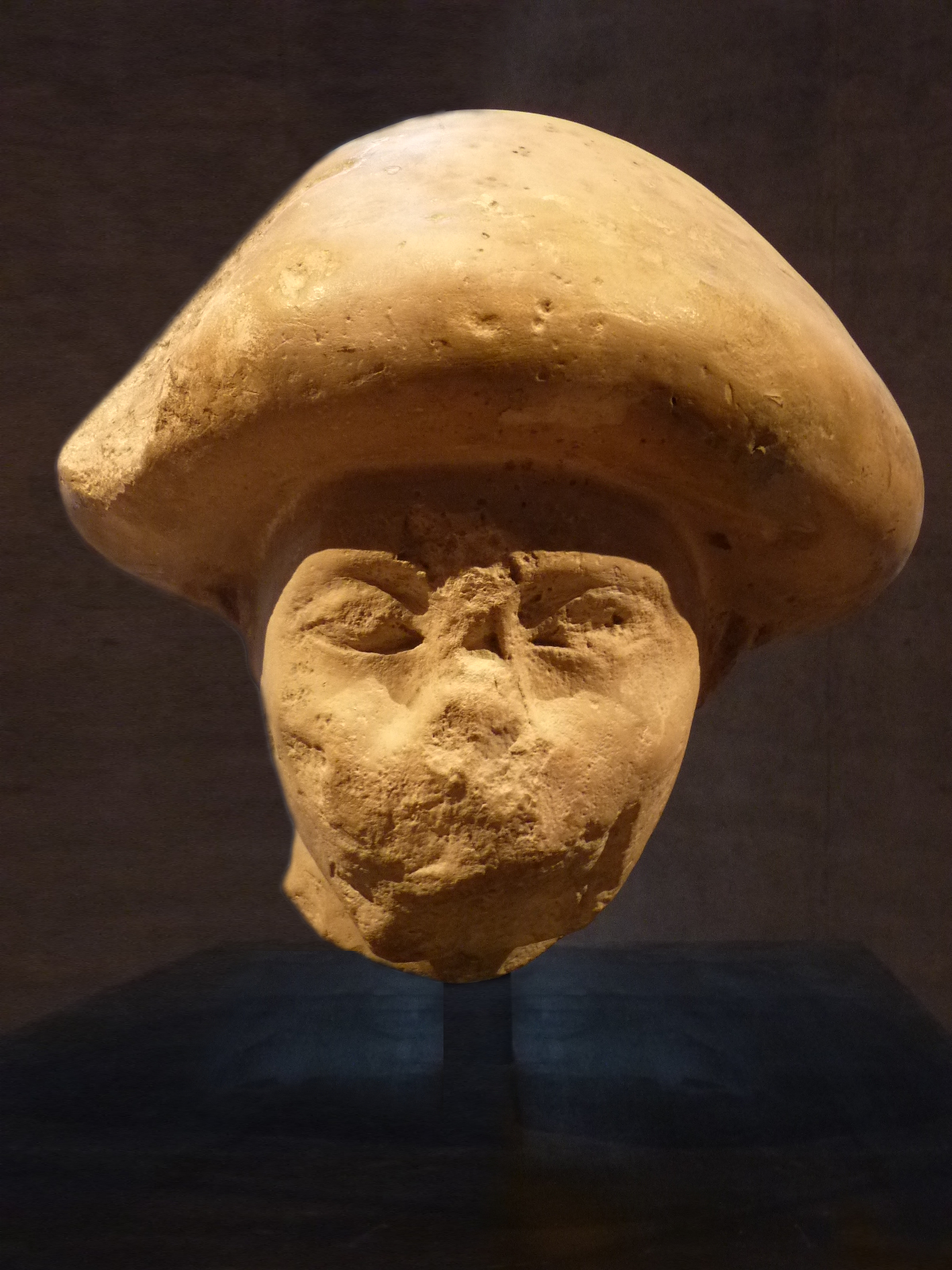
An official wearing the "mushroom-headed" hairstyle also seen in contemporary paintings of Western Asiatic foreigners such as in the tomb of Khnumhotep II, at Beni Hasan. Excavated in Avaris, the Hyksos capital. Dated to 1802–1640 BC. Staatliche Sammlung für Ägyptische Kunst.

=== Administration ===
The Hyksos show a mix of Egyptian and Levantine cultural traits. Their rulers adopted the full ancient Egyptian royal titulary and employed Egyptian scribes and officials. They also used Near-Eastern forms of administration, such as employing a chancellor (imy-r khetemet) as the head of their administration.

=== Rulers ===
The names, the order, length of rule, and even the number of Fifteenth Dynasty rulers are not known with complete certainty. After the end of their rule, the Hyksos kings were not considered legitimate rulers of Egypt and were omitted from most king lists. The fragmentary Turin King List included six Hyksos kings, however only the name of the last, Khamudi, is preserved. Six names are also preserved in the various epitomes of Manetho, however, it is difficult to reconcile the Turin King List and other sources with names known from Manetho, mainly due to the "corrupted name forms" in Manetho. The name Apepi/Apophis appears in multiple sources, however.

Various other archaeological sources also provide names of rulers with the Hyksos title, however, the majority of kings from the second intermediate period are attested once on a single object, with only three exceptions. Ryholt associates two other rulers known from inscriptions with the dynasty, Khyan and Sakir-Har. The name of Khyan's son, Yanassi, is also preserved from Tell El-Dab'a. The two best attested kings are Khyan and Apepi. Scholars generally agree that Apepi and Khamudi are the last two kings of the dynasty, and Apepi is attested as a contemporary of Seventeenth-Dynasty pharaohs Kamose and Ahmose I. Ryholt has proposed that Yanassi did not rule and that Khyan directly preceded Apepi, but most scholars agree that the order of kings is: Khyan, Yanassi, Apepi, Khamudi. There is less agreement on the early rulers. Sakir-Har is proposed by Schneider, Ryholt, and Bietak to have been the first king.

Recently, archaeological finds have suggested that Khyan may have been a contemporary of the Thirteenth Dynasty pharaoh Sobekhotep IV, potentially making him an early rather than a late Hyksos ruler. This has prompted attempts to reconsider the entire chronology of the Hyksos period, which as of 2018 had not yet reached any consensus.

Some kings are attested from either fragments of the Turin King List or from other sources who may have been Hyksos rulers. According to Ryholt, kings Semqen and Aperanat, known from the Turin King List, may have been early Hyksos rulers, however Jürgen von Beckerath assigns these kings to the Sixteenth Dynasty of Egypt. Another king known from scarabs, Sheshi, is believed by many scholars to be a Hyksos king, however Ryholt assigns this king to the Fourteenth Dynasty of Egypt. Manfred Bietak proposes that a king recorded as Yaqub-Har may also have been a Hyksos king of the Fifteenth Dynasty. Bietak suggests that many of the other kings attested on scarabs may have been vassal kings of the Hyksos.

Hyksos rulers in various sources
Manetho	Turin King List	Genealogy of Ankhefensekhmet	Identification by Redford (1992)	Identification by Ryholt (1997)	Identification by Bietak (2012)	Identification by Schneider (2006) (reconstructed Semitic name in parentheses) (Note: While Schneider identifies each of the names in Menatho with a pharaoh, he does not hold to Manetho's order of the reigns. So, for instance, he identifies Sakir-Har with Archles/Assis, the sixth king in Manetho, but proposes he reigned first.)
Salitis/Saites (19 years)	X 15	Schalek (Note: Identified with Salitis by Bietak.)	Sheshi	?Semqen (Šamuqēnu)?	?Sakir-Har?	? (Šarā-Dagan [Šȝrk[n] ])
Bnon (44 years)	X 16.... 3 years		Yaqub-Har	?Aper-Anat ('Aper-'Anati)?	?Meruserre Yaqub-Har?	? (*Bin-ʿAnu)
Apachnan/Pachnan (36/61 years)	X 17... 8 years 3 months		Khyan	Sakir-Har	Seuserenre Khyan	Khyan ([ʿApaq-]Hajran)
Iannas/Staan (50 years)	X 18... 10 (20, 30) years		Yanassi (Yansas-X)	Khyan	Yanassi (Yansas-idn)	Yanassi (Jinaśśi'-Ad)
Apophis (61/14 years)	X 19... 40 + x years	Apepi (?'A-ken?) (Note: This name appears as a separate individual preceding Apepi, but it appears to mean "brave ass" and may be a disparaging reference to Apepi.)	Apepi	Apepi	A-user-Re Apepi	Apepi (Apapi)
Archles/Assis (40/30 years) (Note: In Eusebius and Africanus's epitomes of Manetho, "Apopis" appears in final position, while Archles appears as the fifth ruler. In Josephus, Assis is the final ruler and Apophis the fifth ruler. The association of the names Archles and Assis with one another is a modern reconstruction.)			identifies with ?Khamudi?	identifies with Khamudi	Identifies with Khamudi	Sakir-Har (Sikru-Haddu)
Archles/Assis (40/30 years)	X 20 Khamudi		?Khamudi? (Note: Redford argues that the name "suits neither Assis nor Apophis".)	Khamudi	Khamudi	not in Manetho (Halmu'di)
Sum: 259 years (Note: In the epitome of Manetho by Eusebius, the total instead comes to 284 years.)	Sum: 108 years (Note: This reading is based on a partially damaged section of the papyrus. Reconstructions of the damaged Turin King List proposed in 2018 would change the reading of years to up to 149 years (Ryholt) or between 160 and 180 years (Schneider).)					

None of the proposed identifications besides of Apepi and Apophis is considered certain.

In Sextus Julius Africanus's epitome of Manetho, the rulers of Sixteenth Dynasty are also identified as "shepherds" (i.e. Hyksos) rulers. Following the work of Ryholt in 1997, most but not all scholars now identify the Sixteenth Dynasty as a native Egyptian dynasty based in Thebes, following Eusebius's epitome of Manetho; this dynasty would be contemporary to the Hyksos.

=== Diplomacy ===
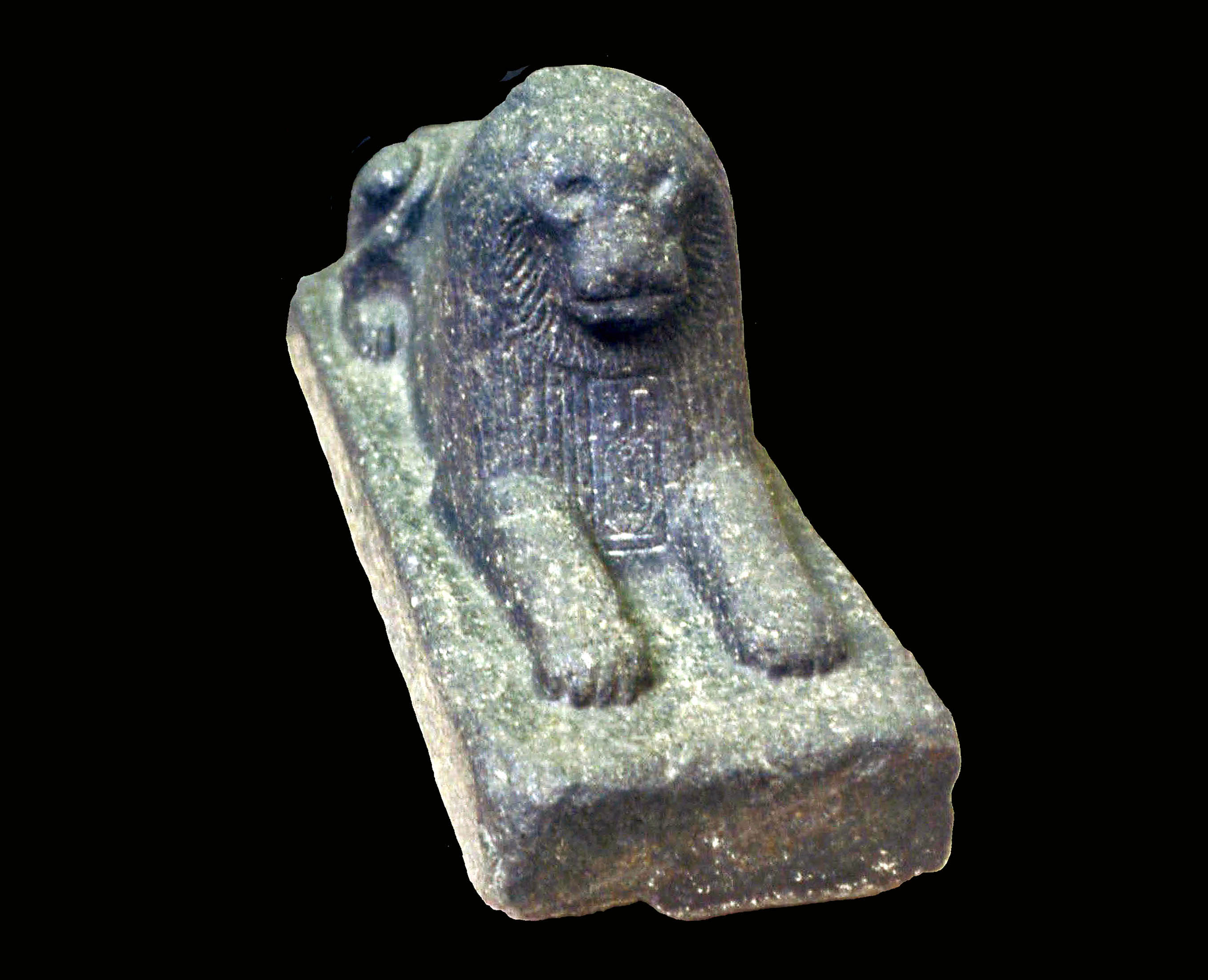
Lion inscribed with the name of the Hyksos ruler Khyan, found in Baghdad, suggesting relations with Babylon. The prenomen of Khyan and epithet appear on the breast. British Museum, EA 987.

The Hyksos engagement in long-distance diplomacy is confirmed by a cuneiform letter discovered in the ruins of Avaris. Hyksos diplomacy with Crete and ancient Near East is also confirmed by the presence of gifts from the Hyksos court in those places. Khyan, one of the Hyksos rulers, is known for his wide-ranging contacts, as objects in his name have been found at Knossos and Hattusha indicating diplomatic contacts with Crete and the Hittites, and a sphinx with his name was bought on the art market at Baghdad and might demonstrate diplomatic contacts with Babylon, possibly with the first Kassites ruler Gandash.

The Theban rulers of the Seventeenth Dynasty are known to have imitated the Hyksos both in their architecture and regnal names. There is evidence of friendly relations between the Hyksos and Thebes, including possibly a marriage alliance, before the reign of the Theban pharaoh Seqenenra Tao.

An intercepted letter between Apepi and the King of Kingdom of Kerma, also called Kush, to the south of Egypt recorded on the Carnarvon Tablet has been interpreted as evidence of an alliance between the Hyksos and Kermans. Intensive contacts between Kerma and the Hyksos are further attested by seals with the names of Asiatic rulers or with designs known from Avaris at Kerma. The troops of Kerma are known to have raided as far north as Elkab according to an inscription of Sobeknakht II. According to his second stele, Kamose was effectively caught between the campaign for the siege of Avaris in the north and the offensive of Kerma in the south; it is unknown whether or not the Kermans and Hyksos were able to combine forces against him. Kamose reports returning "in triumph" to Thebes. Lutz Popko suggests that this "was perhaps a mere tactical retreat to prevent a war on two fronts". Ahmose I was also forced to confront a threat from the Nubians during his siege of Avaris: he was able to stop the forces of Kerma by sending a strong fleet, killing their ruler named A'ata. Ahmose I boasts about these successes on his tomb at Thebes. The Kermans also appear to have provided mercenaries to the Hyksos.

=== Vassalage ===
Many scholars have described the Egyptian dynasties contemporary to the Hyksos as "vassal" dynasties, an idea partially derived from the Nineteenth-Dynasty literary text The Quarrel of Apophis and Seqenenre, in which it is said "the entire land paid tribute to him [Apepi], delivering their taxes in full as well as bringing all good produce of Egypt." The belief in Hyksos vassalage was challenged by Ryholt as "a baseless assumption." Roxana Flammini suggests instead that Hyksos exerted influence through (sometimes imposed) personal relationships and gift-giving. Manfred Bietak continues to refer to Hyksos vassals, including minor dynasties of West Semitic rulers in Egypt.

== Society and culture ==
=== Royal construction and patronage ===
The so-called "Hyksos sphinxes"
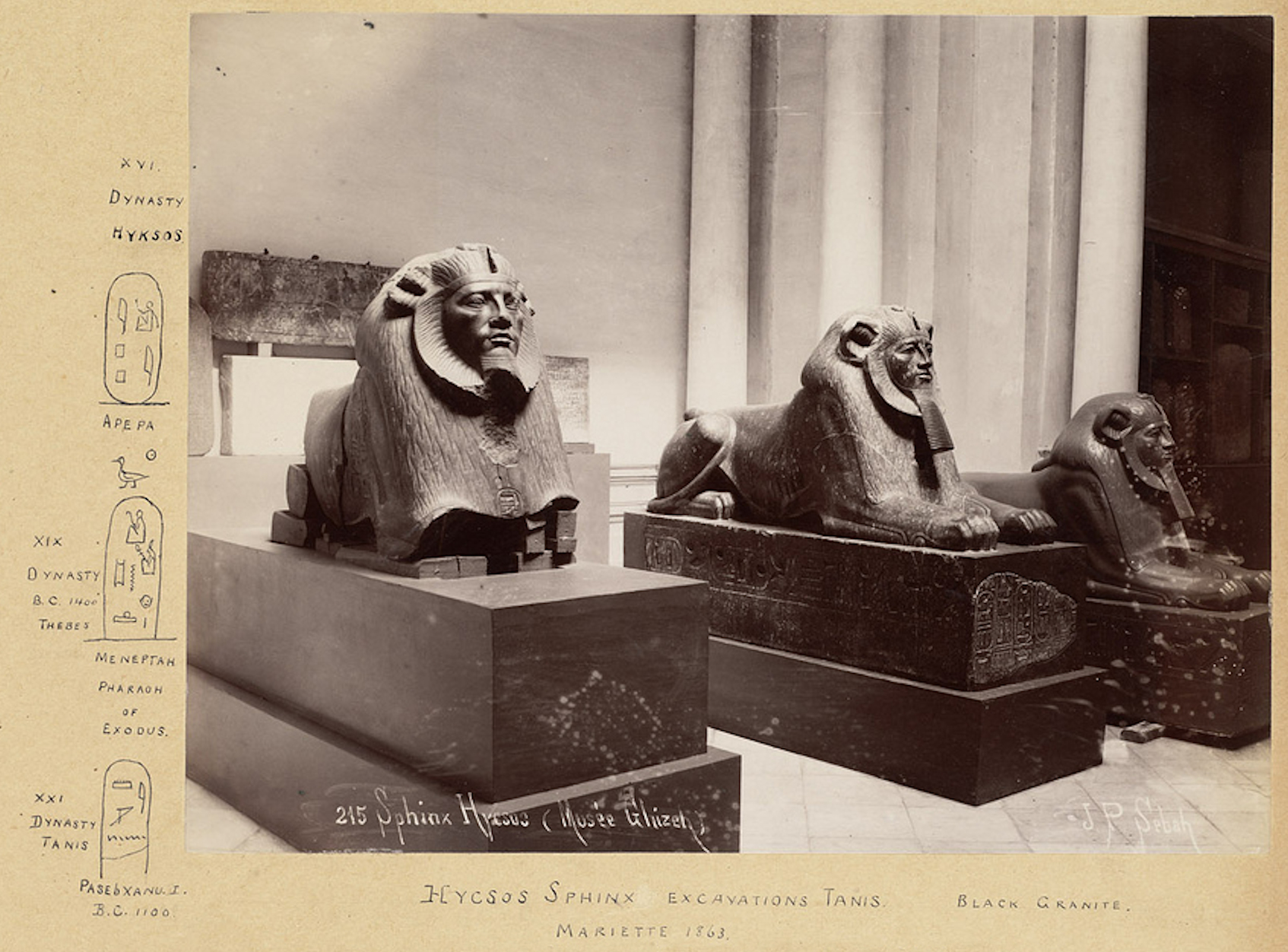
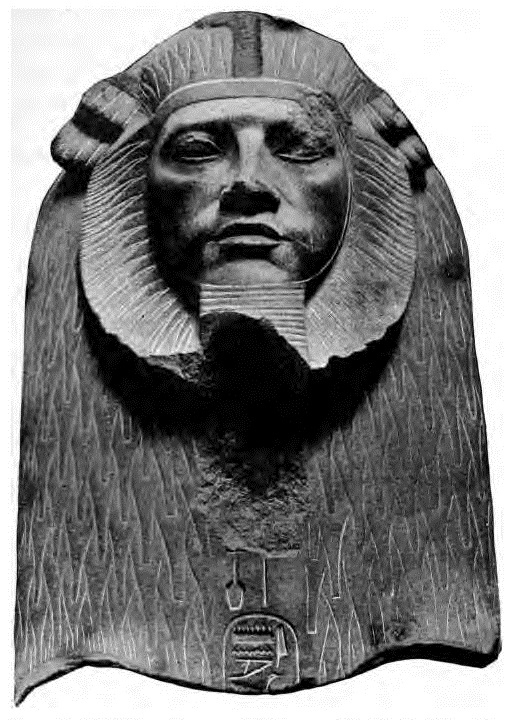
The so-called "Hyksos sphinxes" are peculiar sphinxes of Amenemhat III which were reinscribed by several Hyksos rulers, including Apepi. Earlier Egyptologists thought these were the faces of actual Hyksos rulers.

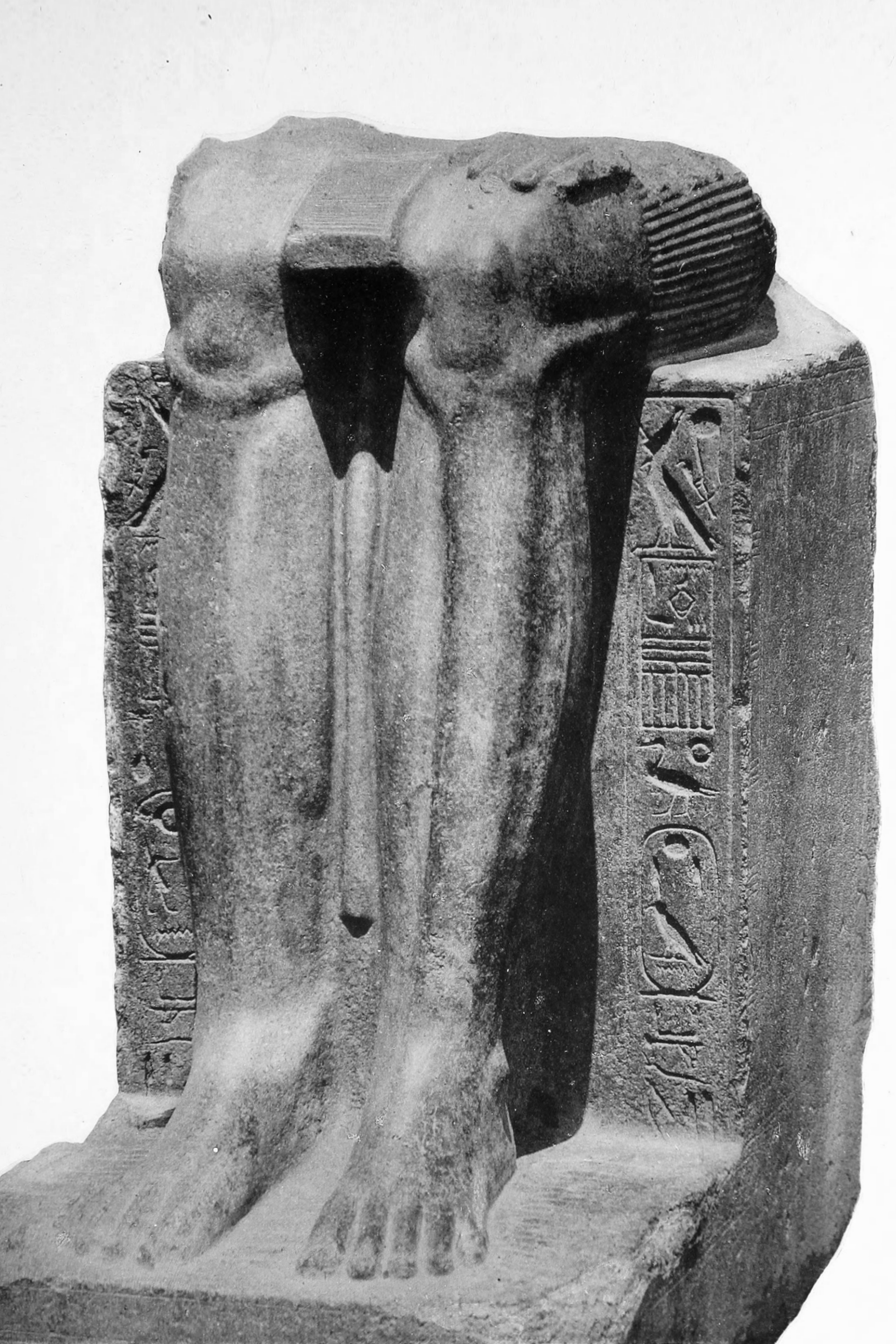
Remains of a statue of the Twelfth Dynasty reappropriated by Hyksos ruler "Khyan", with his name inscribed on the sides over an erasure.

The Hyksos do not appear to have produced any court art, instead appropriating monuments from earlier dynasties by writing their names on them. Many of these are inscribed with the name of King Khyan. A large palace at Avaris has been uncovered, built in the Levantine rather than the Egyptian style, most likely by Khyan. King Apepi is known to have patronized Egyptian scribal culture, commissioning the copying of the Rhind Mathematical Papyrus. The stories preserved in the Westcar Papyrus may also date from his reign.

The so-called "Hyksos sphinxes" or "Tanite sphinxes" are a group of royal sphinxes depicting the earlier pharaoh Amenemhat III (Twelfth Dynasty) with some unusual traits compared to conventional statuary, for example prominent cheekbones and the thick mane of a lion, instead of the traditional nemes headcloth. The name "Hyksos sphinxes" was given due to the fact that these were later reinscribed by several of the Hyksos kings, and were initially thought to represent the Hyksos kings themselves. Nineteenth-century scholars attempted to use the statues' features to assign a racial origin to the Hyksos. These Sphinxes were seized by the Hyksos from cities of the Middle Kingdom and then transported to their capital Avaris where they were reinscribed with the names of their new owners and adorned their palace. Seven of those sphinxes are known, all from Tanis, and now mostly located in the Cairo Museum. Other statues of Amenehat III were found in Tanis and are associated with the Hyksos in the same manner.

=== Burial practices ===
Evidence for distinct Hyksos burial practices in the archaeological record include burying their dead within settlements rather than outside them like the Egyptians. While some of the tombs include Egyptian-style chapels, they also include burials of young females, probably sacrifices, placed in front of the tomb chamber. There are also no surviving Hyksos funeral monuments in the desert in the Egyptian style, though these may have been destroyed. The Hyksos also interred infants who died in imported Canaanite amphorae. The Hyksos also practiced the burial of horses and other equids, likely a composite custom of the Egyptian association of the god Set with the donkey and near-eastern notions of equids as representing status.

=== Technology ===
The Hyksos use of horse burials suggest that the Hyksos introduced both the horse and the chariot to Egypt, however no archaeological, pictorial, or textual evidence exists that the Hyksos possessed chariots, which are first mentioned as ridden by the Egyptians in warfare against them by Ahmose, son of Ebana, at the close of Hyksos rule. In any case, it does not appear that chariots played any large role in the Hyksos rise to power or their expulsion. Josef Wegner further argues that horse-riding may have been present in Egypt as early as the late Middle Kingdom, prior to the adoption of chariot technology.

Traditionally, the Hyksos have also been credited with introducing a number of other military innovations, such as the sickle-sword and composite bow; however, "[t]o what extent the kingdom of Avaris should be credited for these innovations is debatable," with scholarly opinion currently divided. It is also possible that the Hyksos introduced more advanced bronze working techniques, though this is inconclusive. They may have worn full-body armor, whereas the Egyptians did not wear armor or helmets until the New Kingdom.

The Hyksos also introduced better weaving techniques and new musical instruments to Egypt. They introduced improvements in viniculture as well.

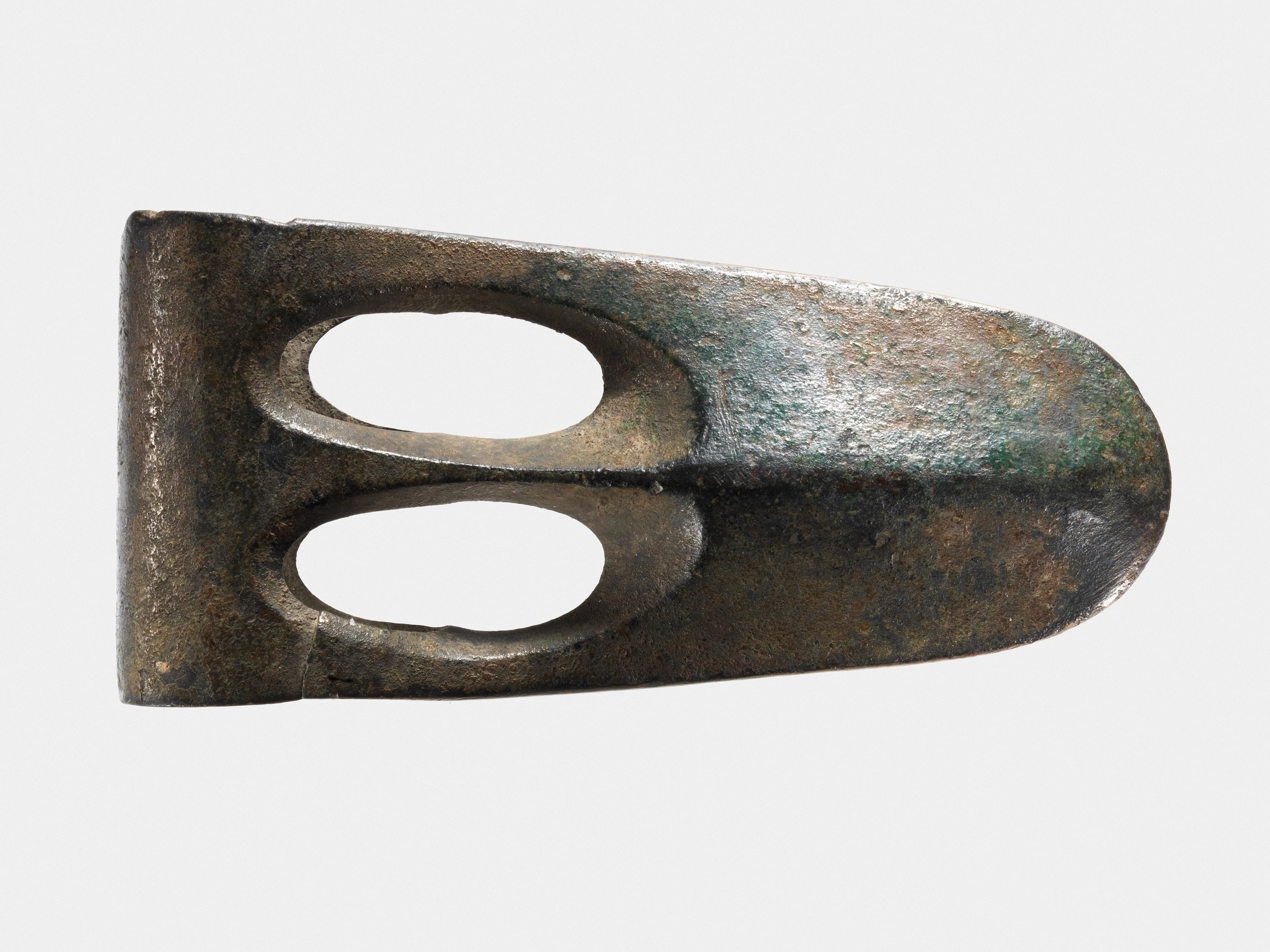
Egyptian duckbill-shaped axe blade of Syro-Palestinian type, a lethal technology probably introduced by the Hyksos (1981–1550 BC).

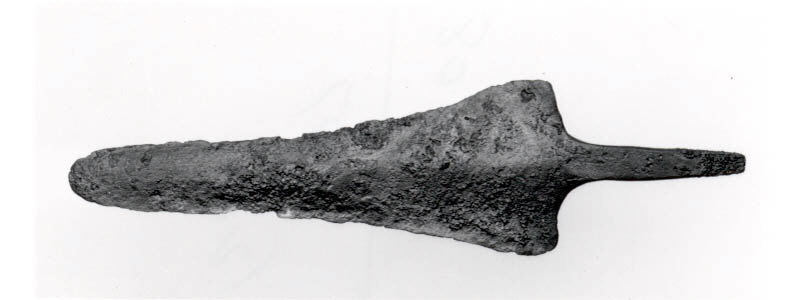
A bronze Hyksos-period spearhead, found in Lachish (1780–1580 BC).

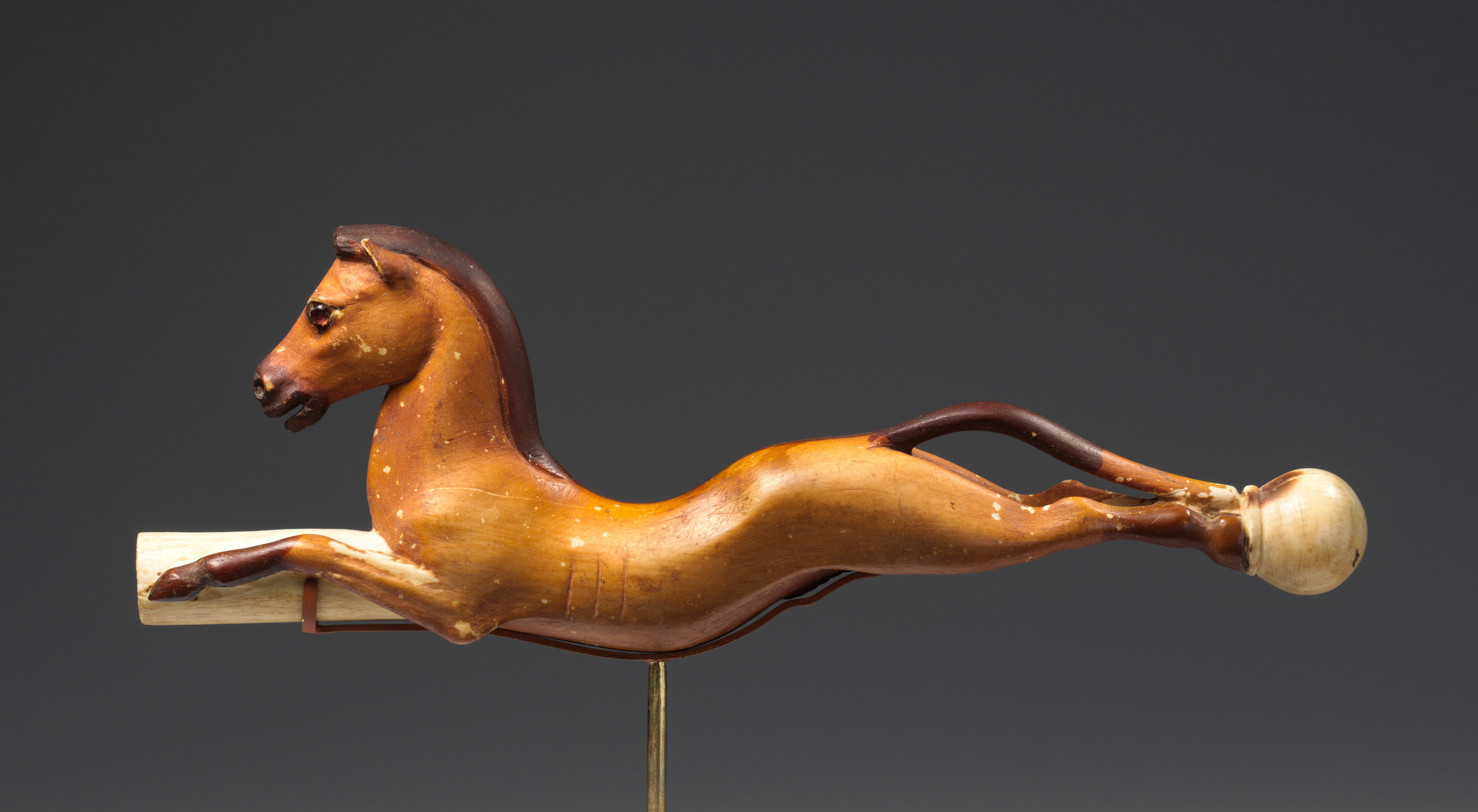
The horse was probably introduced to Egypt by the Hyksos, and became a favourite subject of Egyptian art, as in this whip handle from the reign of Amenhotep III (1390–1353 BC).

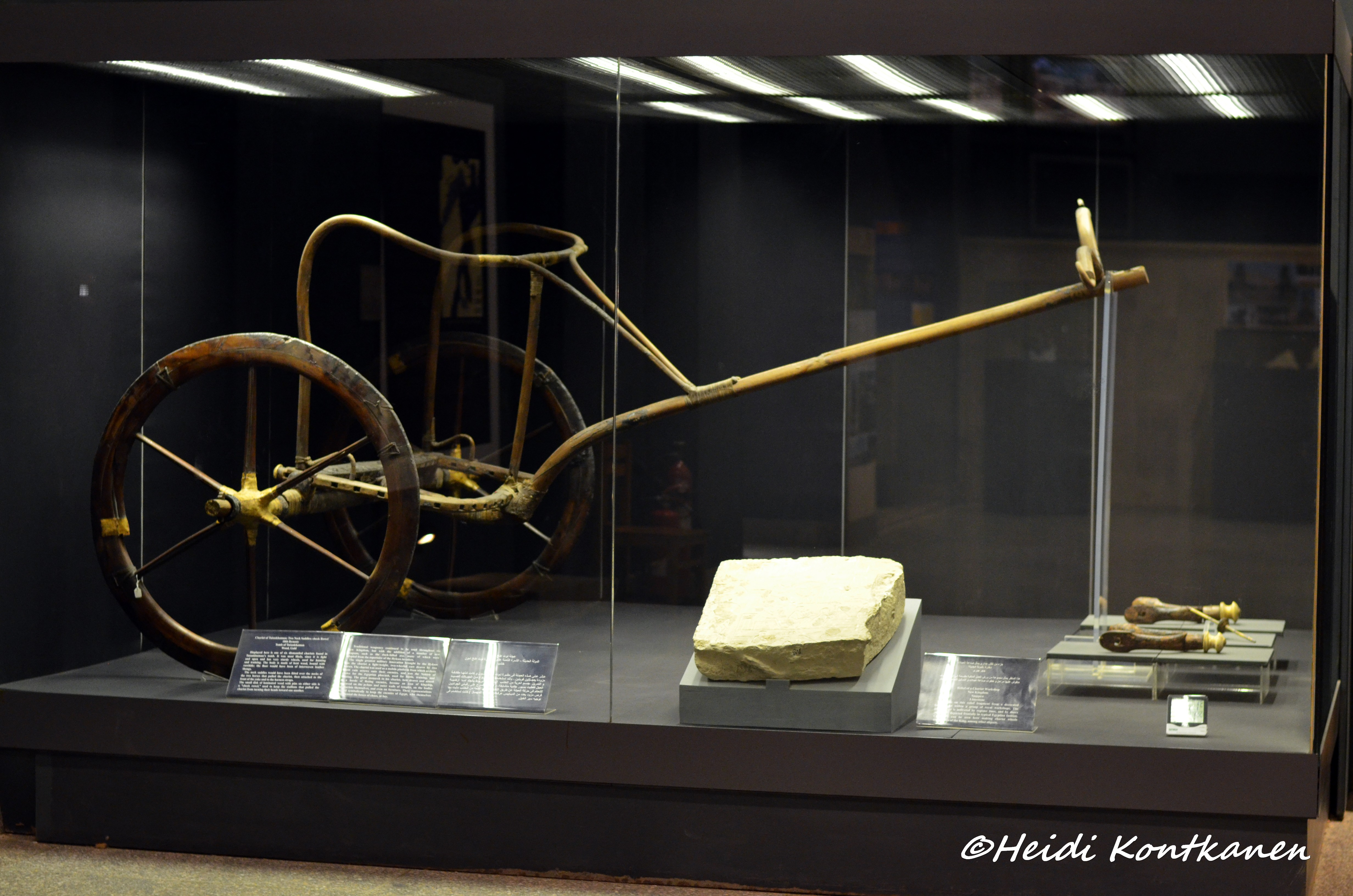
The two-wheeled horse chariot, here found in the tomb of Tutankhamun, may have been introduced to Egypt by the Hyksos.

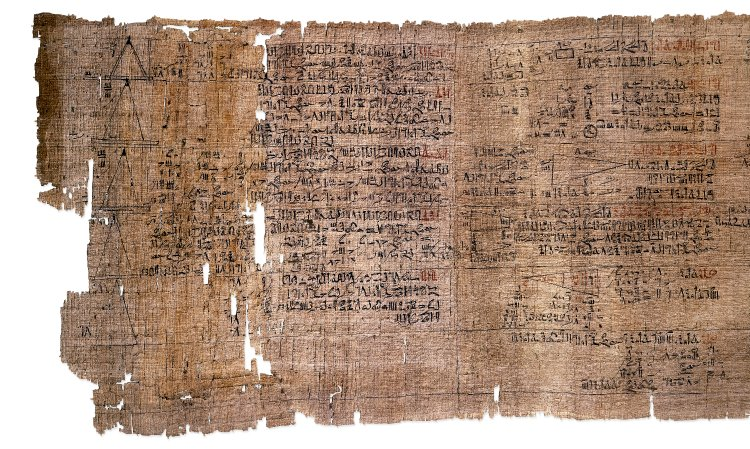
The Rhind Mathematical Papyrus was copied for the Hyksos king Apepi.

=== Trade and economy ===
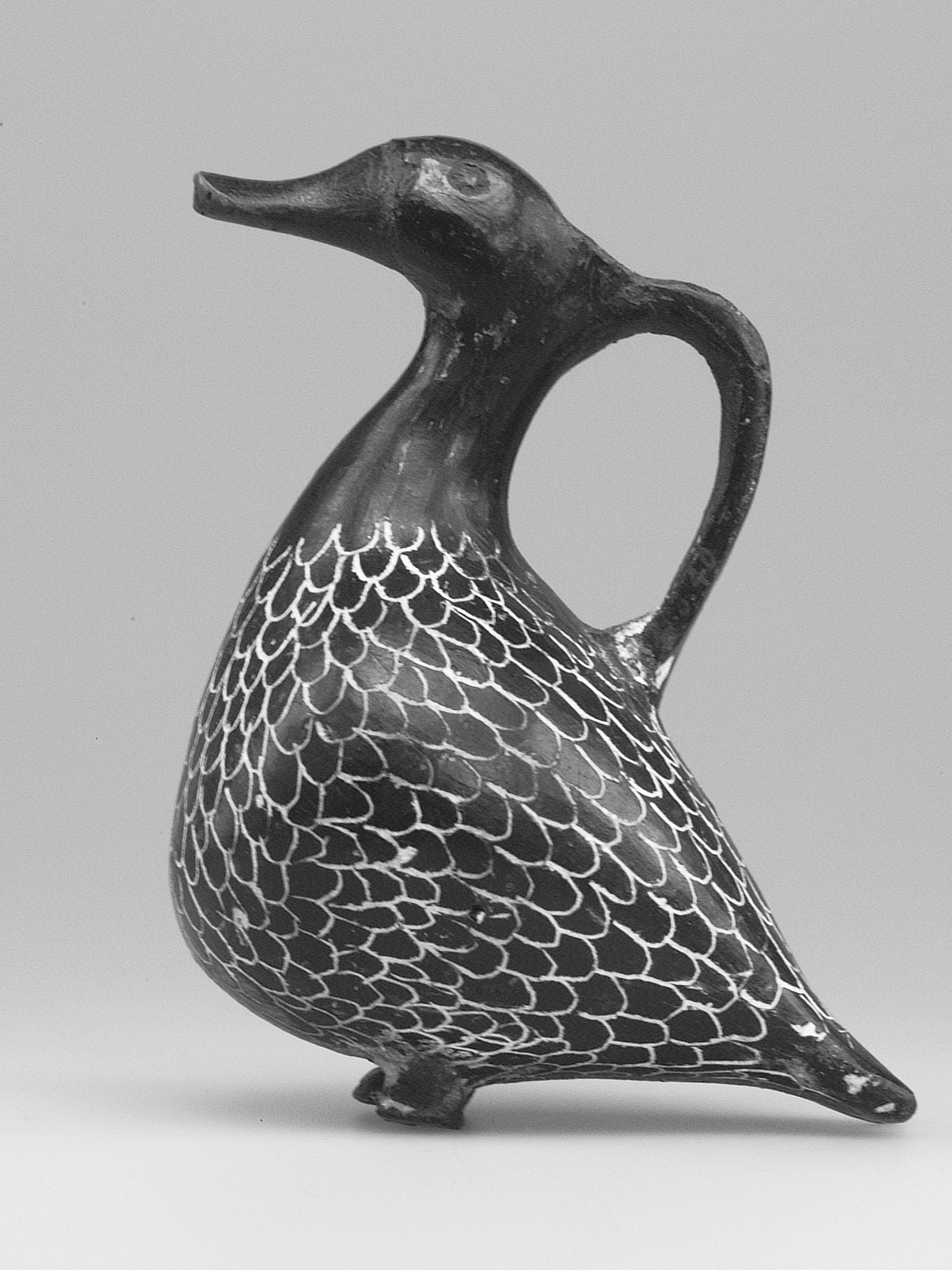
An example of Egyptian Tell el-Yahudiyeh Ware, a Levantine-influenced style.

The early period of Hyksos presence established their capital of Avaris "as the commercial capital of the Delta". The trading relations of the Hyksos were mainly with Canaan and Cyprus. Trade with Canaan is said to have been "intensive", especially with many imports of Canaanite wares, and may have reflected the Canaanite origins of the dynasty. Trade was mostly with the cities of the northern Levant, but connections with the southern Levant also developed. Additionally, trade was conducted with Faiyum, Memphis, oases in Egypt, Nubia, and Mesopotamia. Trade relations with Cyprus were also very important, particularly at the end of the Hyksos period. Aaron Burke has interpreted the equid burials in Avaris of evidence that the people buried with them were involved in the caravan trade. Anna-Latifa Mourad argues that "Hyksos were particularly interested in opening new avenues of trade, securing strategic posts in the eastern Delta that could give access to land-based and sea-based trade routes." These include the apparent Hyksos settlements of Tell el-Habwa I and Tell el-Maskhuta in the eastern Delta.

According to the Kamose stelae, the Hyksos imported "chariots and horses, ships, timber, gold, lapis lazuli, silver, turquoise, bronze, axes without number, oil, incense, fat and honey". The Hyksos also exported large quantities of material looted from southern Egypt, especially Egyptian sculptures, to the areas of Canaan and Syria. These transfers of Egyptian artifacts to the Near East may especially be attributed to king Apepi. The Hyksos also produced local, Levantine-influenced industries, such as Tell el-Yahudiyeh Ware.

There is little evidence of trade between Upper and Lower Egypt during the Hyksos period, and Manfred Bietak proposes that there was "a mutual trade boycott". Bietak proposes that this decreased the Hyksos ability to trade with the Mediterranean and weakened their economy.

=== Religion ===
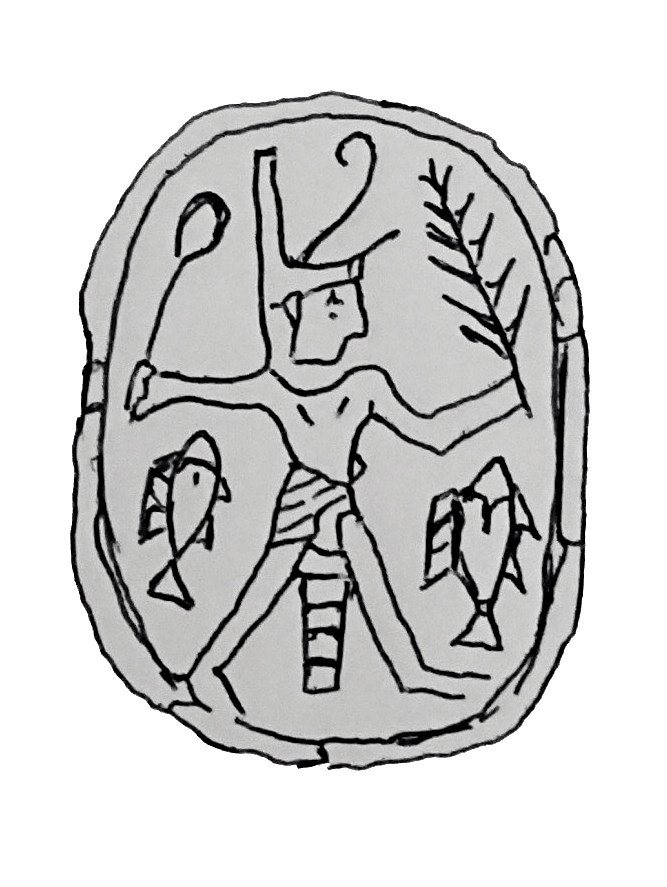
Drawing of a Hyksos-era scarab found at Tell el-Dab'a depicting the pharaoh as the Near-Eastern weather god (Baal) or vice versa. The aim appears to be to present the Hyksos ruler as a divine figure. Original privately owned, kept at the University of Fribourg.

Temples in Avaris existed both in Egyptian and Levantine style, the latter presumably for Levantine gods. The Hyksos are known to have worshiped the Canaanite storm god Baal, who was associated with the Egyptian god Set. Set appears to have been the patron god of Avaris as early as the Fourteenth Dynasty. Hyksos iconography of their kings on some scarabs shows a mixture of Egyptian pharaonic dress with a raised club, the iconography of Baal. Despite later sources claiming the Hyksos were opposed to the worship of other gods, votive objects given by Hyksos rulers to gods such as Ra, Hathor, Sobek, and Wadjet have also survived.

=== Genetic impact ===
Genetic data from mummies of the Third Intermediate Period (787-544 BCE), published in 2017 and again analyzed in 2025, showed marginal continuity from the Nuwayrat Old Kingdom individual (NUE001) sample, complemented by a significant Levantine ancestry influx. The main ancestry source of the Third Intermediate Period mummies was Bronze Age Levant ancestry, appearing at around 64% in the main model (P=0.32). The best-fit three-source model showed 46% for Levantine, 18% for Mesopotamian, and 36% for Moroccan-type ancestry (P=0.24). This shift towards majoritary Levantine ancestry could have originated in the proposed Bronze Age Canaanite expansion of the end of the Middle Kingdom and the advent of the Second Intermediate Period of Egypt, associated with the rise of the Hyksos and the Late Bronze Age collapse.

A study of dental traits by Nina Maaranen and Sonia Zakrzewski in 2021 on 90 people of Avaris indicated that individuals defined as locals and non-locals were not ancestrally different from one another. The results were in line with the archaeological evidence, suggesting Avaris was an important hub in the Middle Bronze Age eastern Mediterranean trade network, welcoming people from beyond its borders.

== Potential biblical connections ==
=== In the Manethonian–Josephus tradition ===
Josephus, and most of the writers of antiquity, associated the Hyksos with the Jews. Quoting from Manetho's Aegyptiaca, Josephus states that when the Hyksos were expelled from Egypt, they founded Jerusalem (Contra Apion I.90). It is unclear if this is original to Manetho or Josephus's own addition, as Manetho does not mention "Jews" or "Hebrews" in his preserved account of the expulsion. Josephus's account of Manetho connects the expulsion of the Hyksos to another event two hundred years later, in which a group of lepers led by the priest Osarseph were expelled from Egypt to the abandoned Avaris. There they ally with the Hyksos and rule over Egypt for thirteen years before being driven out, during which time they oppress the Egyptians and destroy their temples. After the expulsion, Osarseph changes his name to Moses (Contra Apion I.227-250). Assmann argues that this second account is largely a mixture of the experiences of the later Amarna period with the Hyksos invasion, with Osarseph likely standing in for Akhenaten. The final mention of Osarseph, in which he changes his name to Moses, may be a later interpolation. The second account is sometimes held not to have been written by Manetho at all.

=== In modern scholarship ===
The majority of modern scholars do not believe that the Egyptian story elements in the Bible can be demonstrated with historical methods. However, some scholars have attempted to tie the narratives of the Hyksos period to the exodus period.

Scholars such as Jan Assmann and Donald Redford, for instance, have suggested that the story of the biblical exodus may have been wholly or partially inspired by the expulsion of the Hyksos. Archaeologists Israel Finkelstein and Neil Asher Silberman argue that the exodus narrative perhaps evolved from vague memories of the Hyksos expulsion, spun to encourage resistance to the 7th century domination of Judah by Egypt. An identification with the Hyksos would only depart minimally from accepted biblical chronology, and their expulsion is the only known large-scale expulsion of Asiatics from a location in Egypt. Other scholars, such with Manfred Bietak, have pointed out several problems with such theories, including the conflict between the portrayal of the Hyksos as a ruling elite with a background in trade and seafaring and the biblical portrayal of the Israelites as oppressed in Egypt.

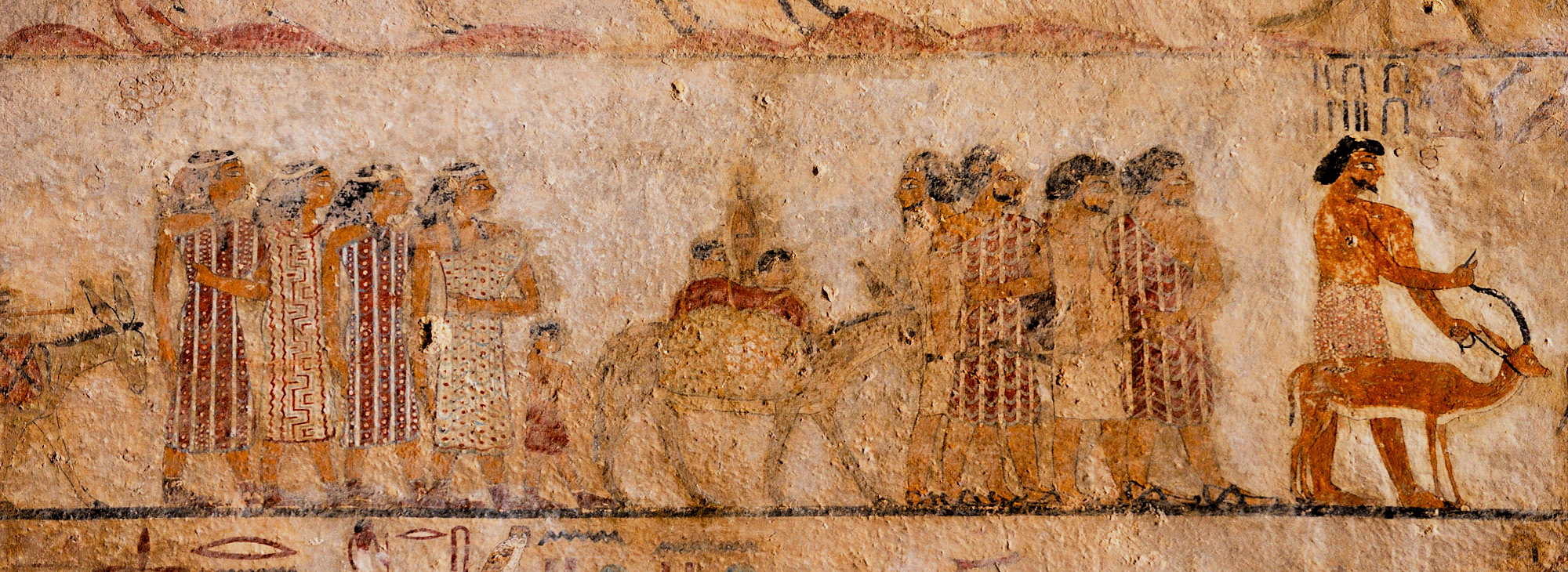
Semitic visitors to Egypt, in the Tomb of Khnumhotep II, c. 1900 BC

John Bright states that Egyptian and Biblical records both suggest that Semitic people maintained access to Egypt at all periods of Egypt's history, and he suggested that it is tempting to suppose that Joseph who, according to the Old Testament (Genesis 39:50), was in favour at the Egyptian court and held high administrative positions next to the ruler of the land, was associated to the Hyksos rule in Egypt during the Fifteenth Dynasty. Such a connection might have been facilitated by their shared Semitic ethnicity. He also wrote that there is no proof for these events. Howard Vos has suggested that the "coat of many colors" said to have been worn by Joseph could be similar to the colorful garments seen in the painting of foreigners in the tomb of Khnumhotep II.

Ronald B. Geobey notes a number of problems with identifying the narrative of Joseph with events either prior to or during the Hyksos' rule, such as the detail that the Egyptians abhorred Joseph's people ("shepherds"; Gen. 46:31) and numerous anachronisms. Manfred Bietak suggests that the story fits better with the ambience of the later Twentieth Dynasty of Egypt, in particular with the xenophobic policy of pharaoh Setnakhte (1189–1186 BC). And Donald Redford argues that "to read [the Joseph story] as history is quite wrongheaded," while Megan Bishop Moore and Brad E. Kelle note the lack of any extra-biblical evidence for the events of Genesis, including the Joseph story, or Exodus.

A number of scholars do not believe that the exodus has any historical basis at all, while only scholars "on the fundamentalist fringe" accept the entire biblical account "unless [it] can be absolutely disproved". The current consensus among archaeologists is that, if an Israelite exodus from Egypt occurred, it must have happened instead in the Nineteenth Dynasty of Egypt (13th century BC), given the first appearance of a distinctive Israelite culture in the archaeological record. The potential connection of the Hyksos to the exodus is no longer a central focus of scholarly study of the Hyksos, but this supposed connection to the Exodus has continued to inspire popular interest.

== Legacy ==
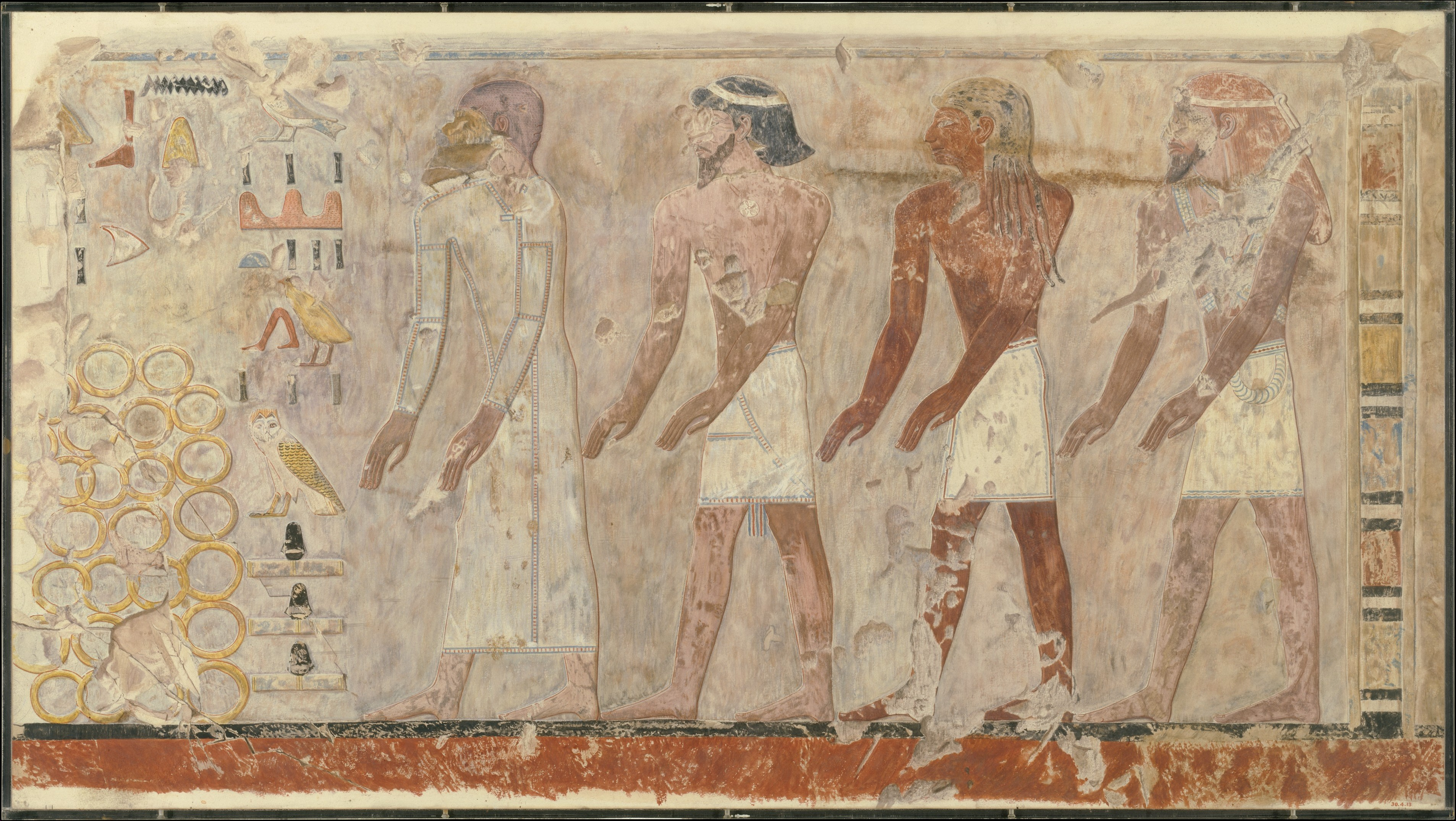
"Four Foreign Chieftains" from tomb TT39 (Metropolitan Museum of Art, MET DT10871). Ca. 1479–1458 BC

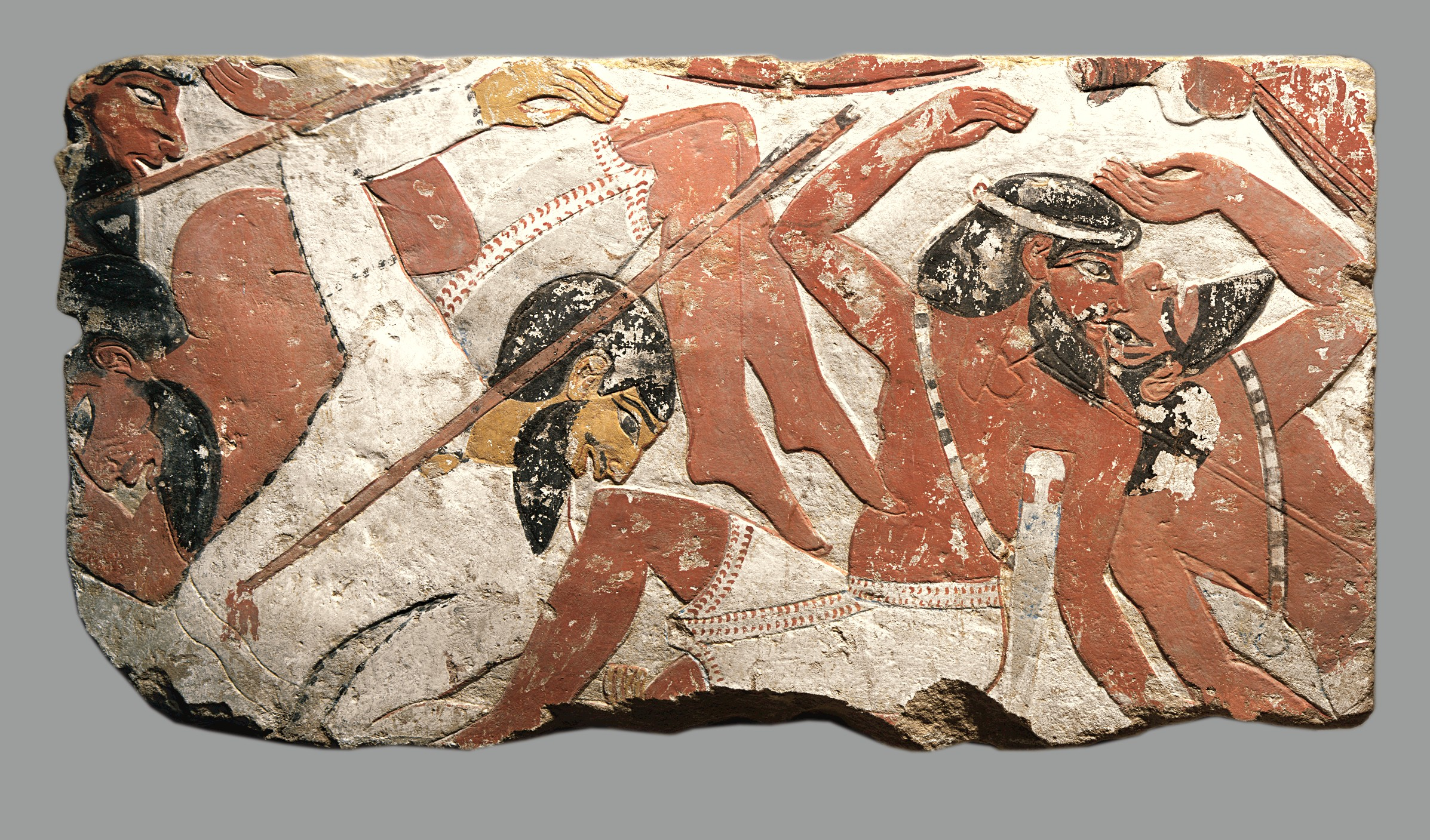
Egyptian relief depicting a battle against West Asiatics. Reign of Amenhotep II, Eighteenth Dynasty, c. 1427–1400 BC.

The Hyksos' rule continued to be condemned by New Kingdom pharaohs such as Hatshepsut, who, 80 years after their defeat, claimed to rebuild many shrines and temples which they had neglected.

Ramses II moved Egypt's capital to the Delta, building Pi-Ramesses near the site of Avaris, where he set up a stela marking the 400th anniversary of the cult of Set. Scholars used to suggest that this marked 400 years since the Hyksos had established their rule, however the lists of Ramesses' ancestors continued to omit the Hyksos and there is no evidence that they were honored during his reign. The Turin King List, which includes the Hyksos and all other disputed or disgraced former rulers of Egypt, appears to date from the reign of Ramesses or one of his successors. The Hyksos are marked as foreign kings via a throw-stick determinative rather than a divine determinative after their names, and the use of the title ḥqꜣ-ḫꜣswt rather than the usual royal title. Kim Ryholt notes that these measures are unique to the Hyksos rulers and "may therefore have been a direct result of what seems to have been deliberate attempt to obliterate the memory of their kingship after their defeat."

=== Egyptian presence in the Levant ===
It is "often accepted" that Egypt established an empire in Canaan at the end of the wars against the Hyksos. Campaigns against locations in Canaan and Syria were conducted by Ahmose I and Thutmose I at the beginning of the Eighteenth Dynasty, as recorded in the tombs of Ahmose, son of Ebana and Ahmose pen-Nekhebet; Thutmose I is also mentioned as having hunted elephants in Syria in inscriptions at the temple of Hatshepsut at Deir el-Bahari. Thutmose III is known to have campaigned widely, conquering the "Shasu" Bedouins of northern Canaan, and the land of Retjenu, as far as Syria and Mittani in numerous military campaigns circa 1450 BC. However, Felix Höflmayer argues that there is little evidence of other campaigns and that "there is no evidence that would suggest such a scenario" as an Egyptian empire during the Eighteenth Dynasty. As regards claims that the campaigns in the Near East were spurred on by Hyksos rule, Thomas Schneider argues that "the empire building started with a delay of two generations and seeing a direct nexus may be as much a historical fallacy as it would be to link the fall of the Soviet Union in [1991] to the end of the Second World War in 1945, two generations earlier."

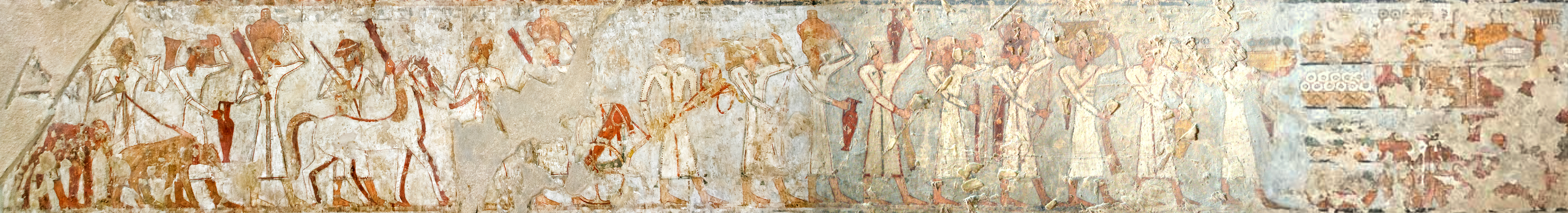
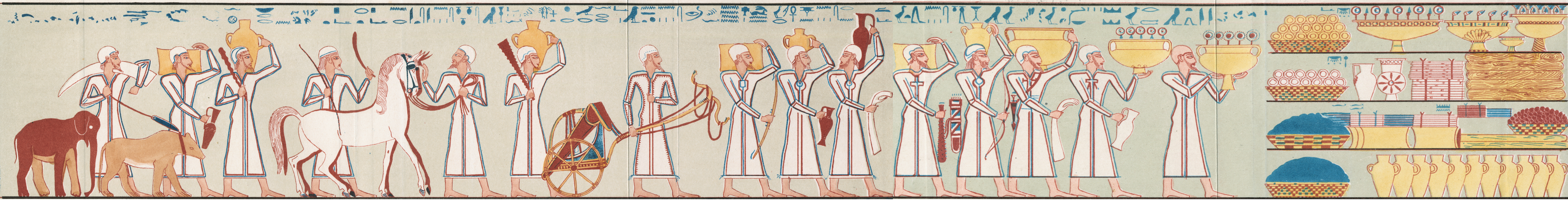
"Retjenu" Syrians bringing tribute to Tuthmosis III, in the tomb of Rekhmire, c. 1450 BC (actual painting and interpretive drawing). They are labeled "Chiefs of Retjenu".

=== Later accounts ===
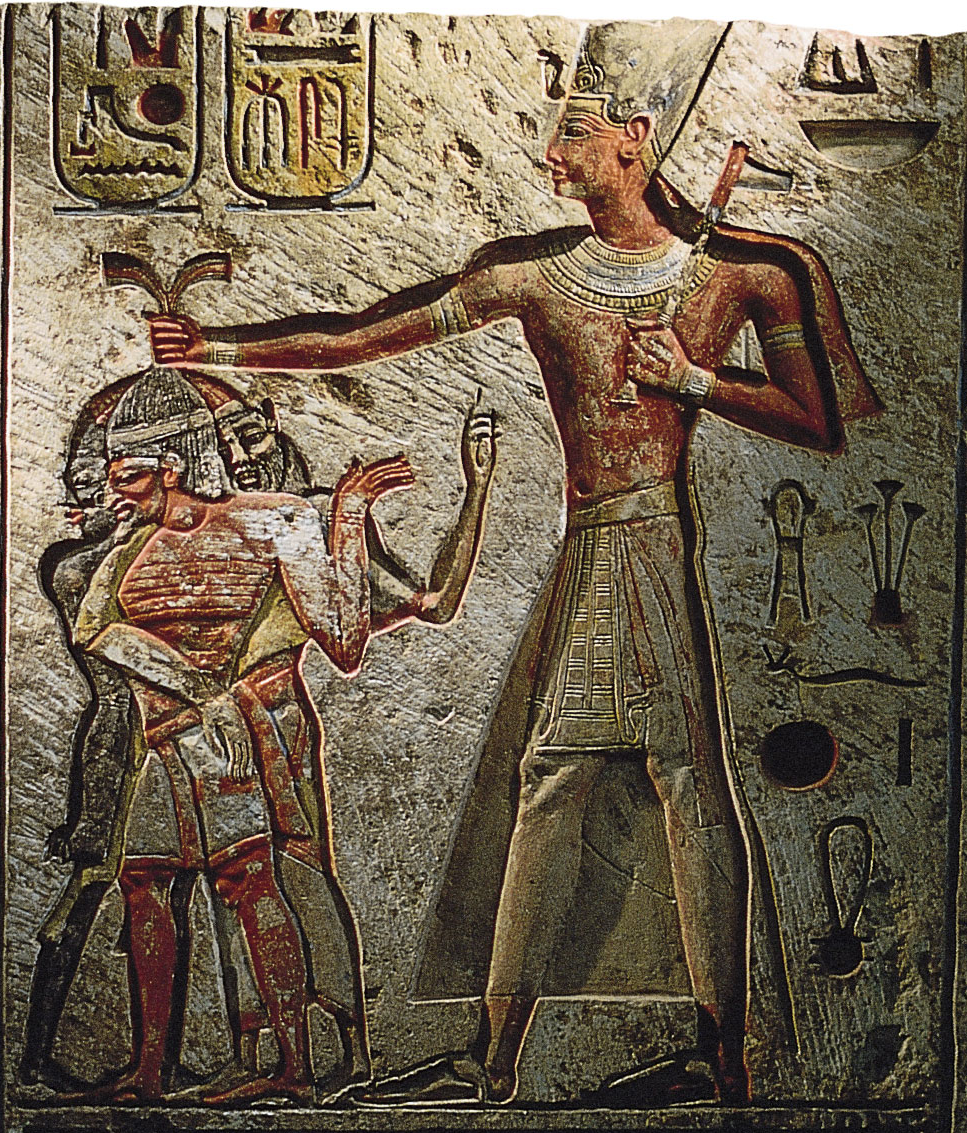
A relief of Ramses II from Memphis showing him capturing enemies: a Nubian, a Libyan and a Syrian, c. 1250 BC. Cairo Museum.

The Nineteenth-Dynasty story The Quarrel of Apophis and Seqenenre claimed that the Hyksos worshiped no god but Set, making the conflict into one between Ra, the patron of Thebes, and Set as patron of Avaris. Furthermore, the battle with the Hyksos was interpreted in light of the mythical battle between the gods Horus and Set, transforming Set into an Asiatic deity while also allowing for the integration of Asiatics into Egyptian society.

Manetho's portrayal of the Hyksos, written nearly 1300 years after the end of Hyksos rule and found in Josephus, is even more negative than the New Kingdom sources. This account portrayed the Hyksos "as violent conquerors and oppressors of Egypt" has been highly influential for perceptions of the Hyksos until modern times. Marc van de Mieroop argues that Josephus's portrayal of the initial Hyksos invasion is no more trustworthy than his later claims that they were related to the Exodus, supposedly portrayed in Manetho as performed by a band of lepers.

=== Early modern depictions ===
The discovery of the Hyksos in the 19th century, and their study following the decipherment of ancient Egyptian scripts, led to various theories about their history, origin, ethnicity and appearance, often illustrated with picturesque and imaginative details.

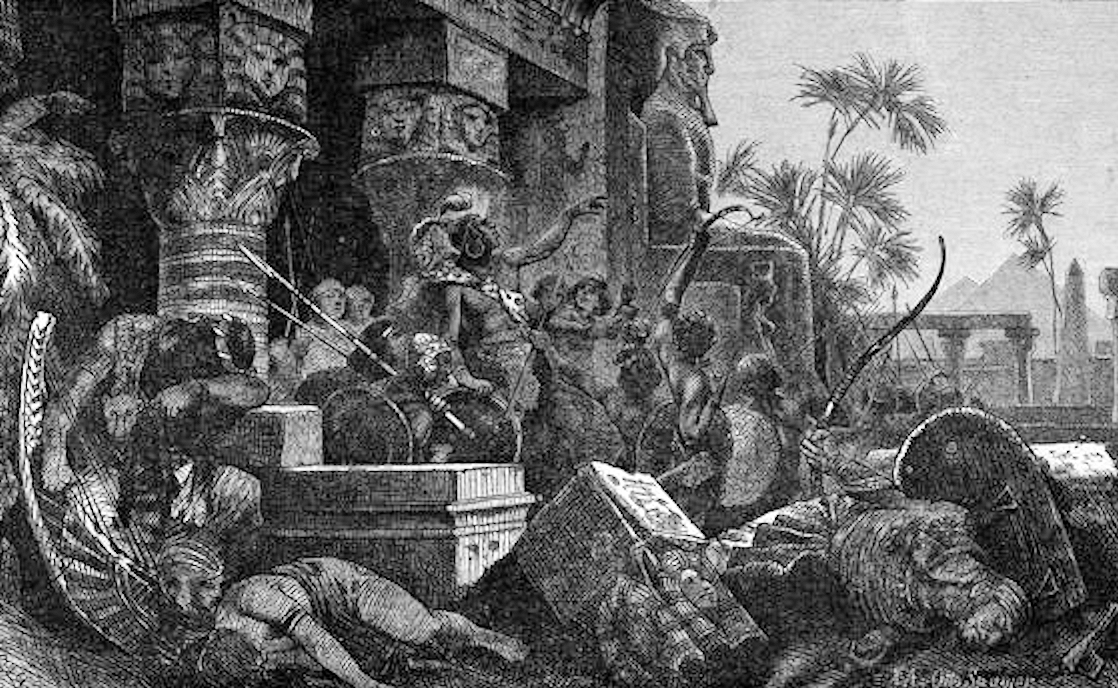
Hyksos invasion as imagined in the 19th century by Hermann Vogel (19th century)

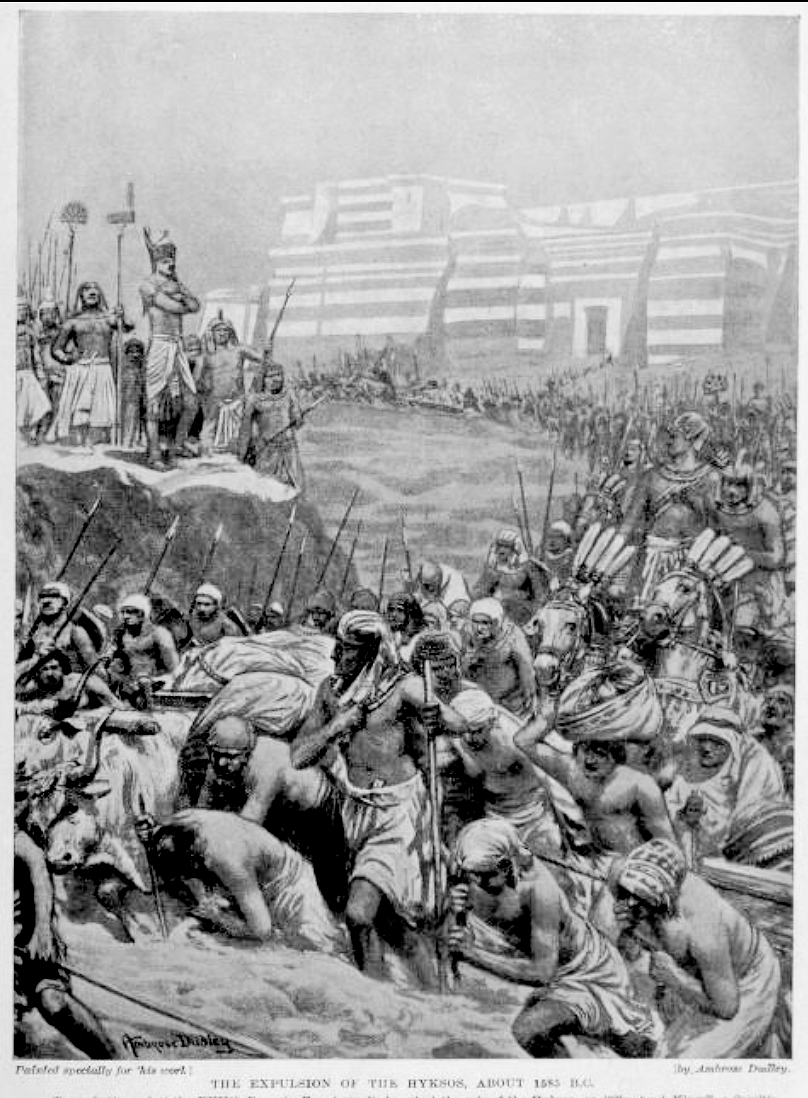
The Expulsion of the Hyksos (1906)

== See also ==
- Anra scarab (artifact)
- Apiru
- Kassites
- Maryannu
- Mitanni
- Philistines
- Sea peoples
- Sino-Babylonianism § Later theories
