= Tanite sphinxes =

Sphinxes of Amenemhat III found at Tanis

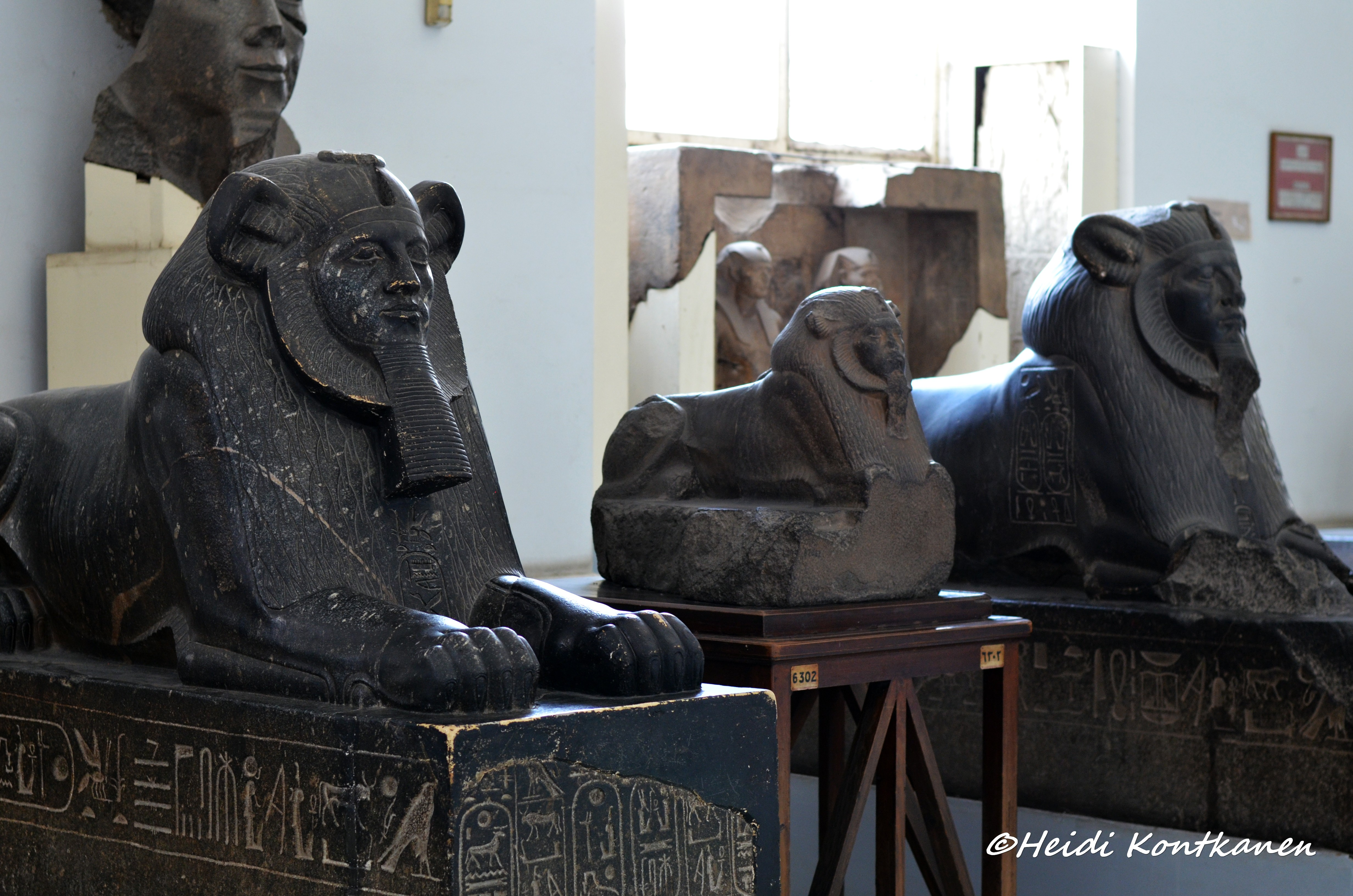
Tanite sphinxes at the Egyptian museum, Cairo, Egypt

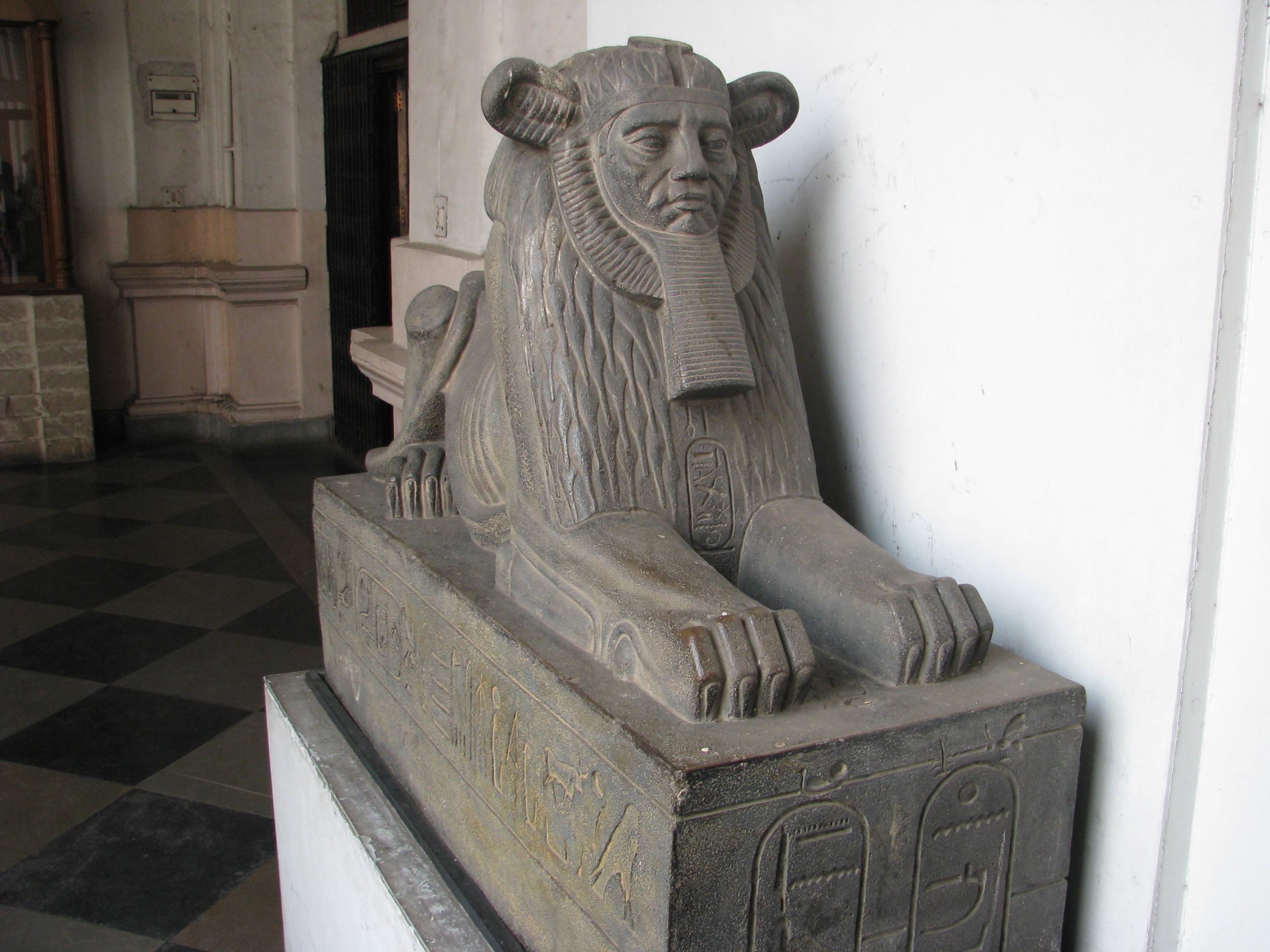
A Tanite sphinx at the Indian Museum, Kolkata

The Tanite sphinxes, also known as the Hyksos sphinxes, are a group of seven sphinx statues discovered at Tanis in the Nile Delta, Egypt. Although they were once thought to represent Hyksos rulers, foreign kings who governed parts of Egypt during the Second Intermediate Period, they are now attributed to the 12th dynasty pharaoh Amenemhat III. The sphinxes are notable for their unique features, such as high cheekbones and a lion's mane and ears instead of the traditional nemes headcloth.

The sphinxes were reinscribed by multiple rulers across different periods, including the Hyksos king Apepi and later pharaohs such as Ramesses II, reflecting a common practice of usurping earlier royal monuments.

Four of the seven Tanite sphinxes are housed at the Egyptian Museum in Cairo, one is in the Grand Egyptian Museum in Giza, one is in the Indian Museum in Kolkata, and one is in the State Museum of Egyptian Art in Munich.

The statues were first attributed to Hyksos rulers by Auguste Mariette, while Vladimir Golenishchev was the first to attribute them to Amenemhat III.

The Sphinx of Taharqo is also depicted in a similar style. Similar sphinxes depicting Hatshepsut are housed at the Egyptian Museum in Cairo and the Metropolitan Museum of Art.

== See also ==
- Great Sphinx of Tanis
