= Shasu =

Bronze–Iron Age nomads in the Southern Levant

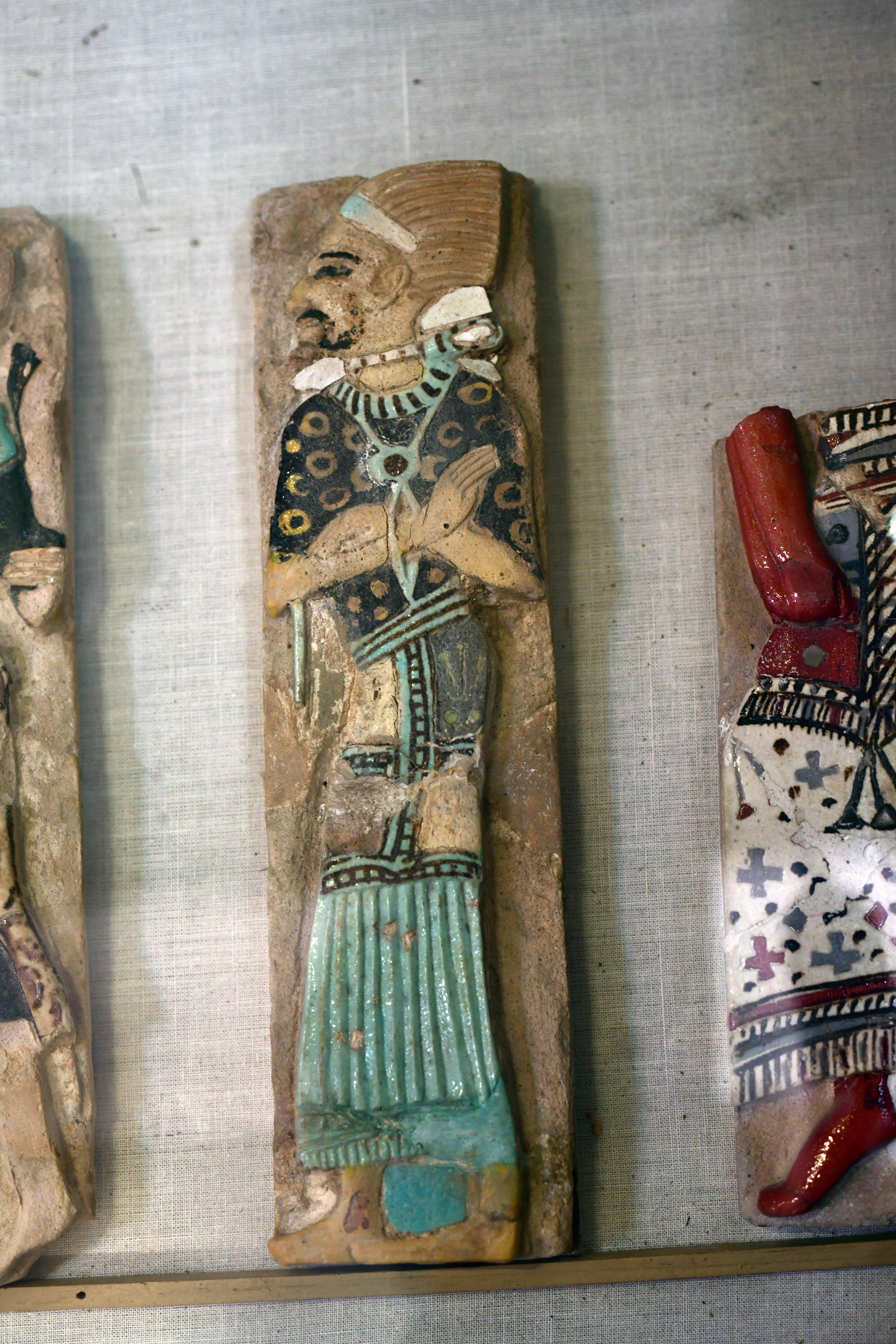
Shasu prisoner as depicted in Ramesses III's reliefs at Medinet Habu.

The Shasu (Ancient Egyptian: šꜣsw, possibly pronounced šaswə) were Semitic-speaking pastoral nomads in the Southern Levant from the late Bronze Age to the Early Iron Age or the Third Intermediate Period of Egypt. They were tent dwellers, organized in clans ruled by a tribal chieftain and were described as brigands active from the Jezreel Valley to Ashkelon, in the Transjordan and in the Sinai. Some of them also worked as mercenaries for Asiatic and Egyptian armies.

== Etymology ==
The name's etymon may be Egyptian šꜣsw, which originally meant "those who move on foot". Levy, Adams, and Muniz report similar possibilities: the Egyptian word šꜣs that means "to wander", and an alternative Semitic triliteral root, Hebrew: שָׁסַס, romanized: šāsas, with the meaning "to plunder".

== History ==
=== Late Bronze Age ===
The earliest known reference to the Shasu occurs in a 16th-century BCE list of peoples in the Transjordan region. The first occurrence of Shasu is in the biographical inscription of Admiral Ahmose found in Elkab, who claims to have taken Shasu prisoners while serving Pharaoh Aakheperenre Thutmose II. The Shasu were on his way as he led a punitive expedition north. Giveon (1971) argued that the only event that could account for the Shasu's appearance at that date was the expulsion of the Hyksos (around 1550 BC).

Though their homeland seems to be in the Transjordan, the Shasu also appear in Canaan, Syria and Egypt.

In the year 39 of Thutmose III, during his 14th campaign, the pharaoh fought the Shasu before reaching the Retjenu. Shasu are therefore found in southern Canaan. According to the Pharaoh's list, they are more specifically located in the Negev (No. 14 of the list).

The name appears in a list of Egypt's enemies inscribed on column bases at the temple of Soleb built by Amenhotep III. Among the details uncovered at the temple was a reference to a place called "sʿrr, in the land of Shasu" (tꜣ-shꜣsw sʿr), a name thought to be related to or near to Petra, Jordan.

In the 13th century BCE, copies of the column inscriptions ordered by Seti I or by Ramesses II at Amara, Nubia, six groups of Shasu are mentioned: those of sʿrr, of rbn, of smʾt, of wrbr, of yhw, and of pysps. The Shasu continued to dominate the hill country of Canaan (Cis-Jordan) and Trans-Jordan regions. The Shasu had become so powerful during this period that they could temporarily cut off Egypt's northern routes. This, in turn, prompted vigorous punitive campaigns by Ramesses II and his son Merneptah. After Egyptian abandonment, Canaanite city-states came under the mercy of the Shasu and the ʿApiru, who were seen as 'mighty enemies'.

The other documents of the 18th dynasty attest to the increasing importance of the Shasu in Canaan, by the large number of prisoners (at Amenhotep II, a list of prisoners gives about half of those of Khor/Kharu), and then by their appointment to Egypt's greatest enemies, like Babylon or Tehenou (Libya).

During the reign of Amenhotep III, the origin of the Shasu ("En-Shasus") is given as near the biblical city of Dothan, a place where bedouins brought their flocks. The story of Joseph in the Hebrew Bible also mentions nomads who come to water their animals at a source near Dothan.

During the pharaoh Seti I's campaign, primarily attested as a historic event by the presence of victory steles found at Tel Megiddo and Beth Shean, the Shasu live in a fertile, mountainous area between Sileh and Pa-Canaan (perhaps the city of Gaza). The introductory text of the relief showing the Shasu under notes: "The Shasu enemies plot a rebellion, their tribal leaders are gathered, standing on the hills of Khor (Kharu), and they are engaged in turmoil and tumult. They don't respect their neighbours, they don't consider the laws of the Palace!" In this campaign, the pharaoh confronts the ʿApiru around Megiddo.

The Shasu would eventually be eclipsed by the Sea Peoples.

== Shasu of Yhw ==
See also: Soleb Inscriptions

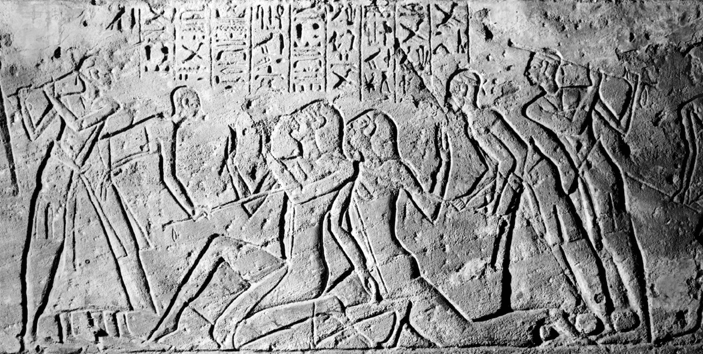
Egyptians beating Shasu spies (detail from the Battle of Kadesh wall-carving)

Two Egyptian texts, one dated to the period of Amenhotep III (14th century BCE), the other to the age of Ramesses II (13th century BCE), refer to tꜣ šꜣśw yhwꜣ, i.e. "The Land of the Shasu yhwꜣ", in which yhwꜣ (also rendered as yhw) or Yahu, is a toponym.

tA M8 M23 w i i h V4 A

Hieroglyph	Name	Pronunciation
tA	N16	tꜣ
M8	M8	šꜣ
M23	M23	sw
w	w	w
i i	y	y
h	h	h
V4	V4	wꜣ
G1	G1	ꜣ

Regarding the name yhwꜣ, Michael Astour observed that the "hieroglyphic rendering corresponds very precisely to the Hebrew Tetragrammaton YHWH, or Yahweh, and antedates the hitherto oldest occurrence of that divine name – on the Mesha Stele – by over five hundred years." K. Van Der Toorn concludes: "By the 14th century BC, before the cult of Yahweh had reached Israel, groups of Edomites and Midianites worshipped Yahweh as their god."

Donald B. Redford has argued that the earliest Israelites, semi-nomadic highlanders in central Canaan mentioned on the Merneptah Stele at the end of the 13th century BCE, are to be identified as a Shasu enclave. Since later Biblical tradition portrays Yahweh "coming forth from Seʿir", the Shasu, originally from Moab and northern Edom/Seʿir, went on to form one central element in the amalgam that would constitute the "Israel" which later established the Kingdom of Israel. Per his analysis of the Amarna letters, Anson Rainey concluded that the description of the Shasu best fits that of the early Israelites. If this identification is correct, these Israelites/Shasu would have settled in the uplands in small villages with buildings similar to contemporary Canaanite structures towards the end of the 13th century BCE.

Objections exist to this proposed link between the Israelites and the Shasu, given that a group of people in relief at Karnak, which has been suggested as depicting the victory over the Israelites, are not described or depicted as Shasu. (Note: However, Yurco's interpretation of these relief also has been contested. See Merneptah Stele § Karnak reliefs for further information.) Frank J. Yurco and Michael G. Hasel would distinguish the Shasu in Merneptah's Karnak reliefs from the people of Israel since they wear different clothing and hairstyles and are determined differently by Egyptian scribes. The Shasu are usually depicted hieroglyphically with a determinative indicating a land, not a people; the most frequent designation for the "foes of Shasu" is the hill-country determinative. Thus, they are differentiated from Israel, which is determined as a people, though not necessarily as a socio-ethnic group; and from (the other) Canaanites, who are defending the fortified cities of Ashkelon, Gezer, and Yenoam. Lawrence Stager also objected to identifying Merneptah's Shasu with Israelites, since the Shasu are shown dressed differently from the Israelites, who are dressed and hairstyled as Canaanites. (Note: If the Egyptian scribe was not clear on the nature of the entity he called "Israel," knowing only that it was "different" from the surrounding modalities, then we can imagine something other than a sociocultural Israel. It is possible that Israel represented a confederation of united, but sociologically distinct, modalities that were joined either culturally or politically via treaties and the like. This interpretation of the evidence would allow for the unity implied by the endonymic evidence and also give our scribe some latitude in his use of the determinative.) Scholars point out that Egyptian scribes tended to bundle up "rather disparate groups of people within a single artificially unifying rubric."

The usefulness of the determinatives has been called into question, though, as in Egyptian writings, including the Merneptah Stele, determinatives are used arbitrarily. Gösta Werner Ahlström countered Stager's objection by arguing that the contrasting depictions are because the Shasu were the nomads, while the Israelites were sedentary, and added: "The Shasu that later settled in the hills became known as Israelites because they settled in the territory of Israel". Moreover, the hill-country determinative is not always used for Shasu, with the Egyptologist Thomas Schneider connecting references to "Yah", believed to be a short form of the Tetragrammaton, with the writings in the Shasu-sequence at Soleb and Amarah-West. In an Egyptian Book of the Dead from the late 18th or 19th dynasty, Schneider identifies a Northwest Semitic theophoric name ʾadōnī-rō‘ē-yāh, meaning "My lord is the shepherd of Yah", which would be the first documented occurrence of the god Yahweh in a theophoric form.

On the other hand, Lester L. Grabbe offers a synthesis of hypotheses, arguing that while the Israelites were a Canaanite people, Shasu contribution cannot be excluded. The highlands were largely uninhabited in the Late Bronze Age, and the settlers would have included former pastoralists, farmers moving to less settled areas, migrants from outside Canaan and people in general seeking a new land and life. According to Grabbe, archaeology suggests that those who settled in the hill country had a pastoralist background, but one in which they lived near settled communities, perhaps forming a symbiotic relationship with the agrarian communities whereby they traded their animals for grain.

In 2025, Dan'el Kahn has argued that the Israelites are not portrayed as Canaanites in the Karnak reliefs as posited by Yurco, but in three reliefs (scenes 5, 7, and 8) they are depicted as Shasu nomads being taken prisoners and led to Egypt.

== See also ==
- Hyksos
- ʿApiru
- Shutu
- Irsu
- Iah
- Ea
