= Timeline of the name Israel =

Historical usage of "Israel" as a place name

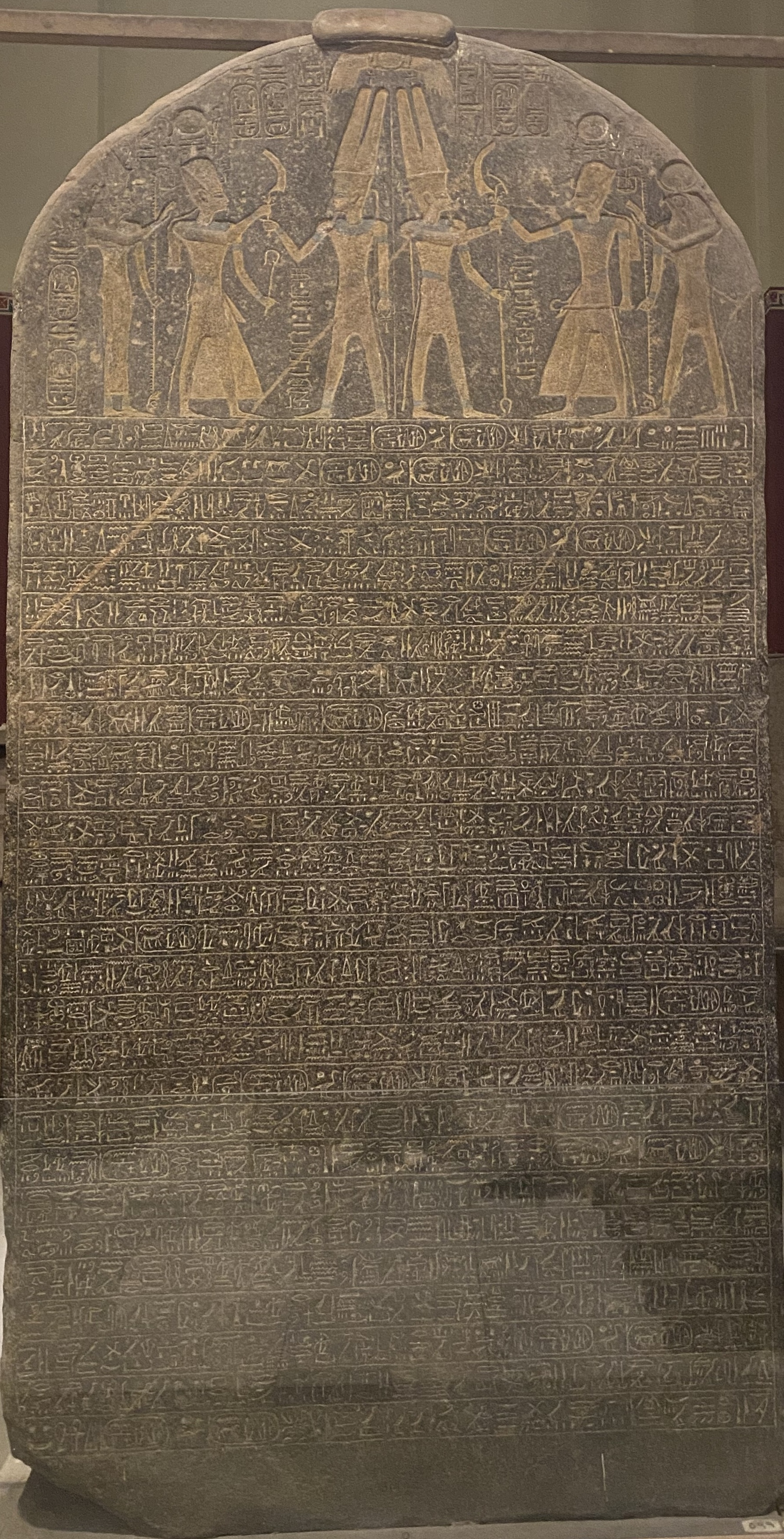
The Merneptah Stele (c. 1208 BCE) is the earliest known reference to "Israel"

The name Israel has been used as a place name from antiquity to the present day, including the modern State of Israel. This article is an incomplete list of notable references to Israel as a place name throughout different historical periods.

== Historical references ==
=== Ancient period ===
- c. 1450 BCE: Berlin pedestal relief: The cartouche on the right (j...šꜣjr) is partially broken off, and in 2001 Manfred Görg proposed that the missing mark was a symbol of a vulture (Gardiner sign G1, representing Egyptian alef). Subsequent imaging studies have lent support to this assessment. Görg suggested that the word would then read "Israel", although this interpretation is disputed by other scholars.
- c. 1208 BCE: Merneptah Stele: "Israel is laid waste". Earliest known textual reference to Israel.
- c. 879 BCE: Kurkh Monoliths, Assyrian stelae whose description of the Battle of Qarqar on the Shalmaneser III monolith contains the name "A-ha-ab-bu Sir-ila-a-a", the first extrabiblical reference to Ahab, king of Israel.
- c. 870-750 BCE: Tel Dan stele: "And the king of I[s-]rael entered previously in my father's land...", "[I killed Jeho]ram son [of Ahab] king of Israel...", "[... and Jehu ru-]led over Is[rael". Mentions of Jehoram and Ahab, kings of Israel, in Old Aramaic written in the Phoenician script.
- c. 840 BCE: Mesha Stele: "Now as for Omri, King of Israel, he oppressed Moab for many days because Kemosh was angry with his land". Most extensive inscription ever recovered that refers to the Kingdom of Israel.
- 68 CE: First Jewish–Roman War rebels' coin: Its obverse bears the inscription "Shekel of Israel" written in the Paleo-Hebrew alphabet.
- 132-136 CE: Bar Kokhba Revolt: rebel Judaean state.
  - Coinage: coins used by the rebels included inscriptions such as "Year two to the freedom of Israel" and "Year One of the Redemption of Israel".
  - Simon bar Kokhba: leader of the revolt is identified unequivocally as the head of an independent state, "Simeon, prince of Israel".

=== Middle Ages ===
- c. 4th–7th century: Susya ancient synagogue, from the Byzantine-era, it has a mosaic floor with a Hebrew inscription that reads "...May peace be upon Israel. Amen."
- c. 6th–7th century: Jericho synagogue, from the Byzantine-era, contains a mosaic floor with a Hebrew inscription that says "Peace [up]on Israel".
- 1161 CE: Maimonides: "the Land of Israel is divided into three parts, and each part of these three is divided into three parts for the purpose of the grove and its boundaries, and he said that Galilee is divided into three parts: Upper Galilee, Lower Galilee, and the valley, and it is the boundary of Tiberias and the Land of Judea".

=== Early modern era ===
- 1565: Joseph Karo, Shulchan Aruch: "There are three regions in the land of Israel distinguished one from the other for matters of marriage..."
- 1718: Isaac de Beausobre & David Lenfant, Le Nouveau Testament de notre seigneur Jesus-Christ: "On a déja eu occafion de parler des divers noms, que portoit autrefois la Terre d'Israël, auffi-bien que de la fituation de Jérufalem, & de fes environs". ("We have already had occasion to speak of the various names that the Land of Israel formerly bore, as well as the location of Jerusalem and its surroundings").

=== Modern era ===
- 1844: Alexander Keith, The Land of Israel, According to the Covenant with Abraham, with Isaac, and with Jacob.
- 1931: National Military Organization in the Land of Israel is established.
- 1940: Fighters for the Freedom of Israel is established. Initially called National Military Organization in Israel.

== See also ==
- Cartography of Israel
- Names of the Levant
