= Khor =

Outpost of Ancient Egypt

Khor (Egyptian: Ḫꜣrw, also transliterated Hurru or Kharu) is a later name used by Ancient Egyptians to designate the wider Syrian region, where speakers of Canaanite languages lived. Ḫꜣrw is attested after the name Retjenu had become archaic. It was long under the hegemony of ancient Egypt and is explicitly mentioned in the Great Hymn to the Aten as a geographic region, along with the kingdoms of Kush and Egypt. Based on the Amarna letters, it is plausible that Khor is a Middle Egyptian reference to Canaan.

Ḫꜣrw is also mentioned on the 19th Dynasty Merneptah Stele (12th Century BCE):

Hatti and Hurru stand for the whole region of Syro-Palestine; Canaan and Israel represent smaller units within the area, and Gezer, Ashkelon, and Yanoam are three cities within the region."

Taharqa, Tarqo of Kush and pharaoh of the 25th Dynasty of Egypt, claimed to conquer this territory in the "list of conquered Asiatic principalities" from the Mut temple at Karnak, as well as in Sanam temple inscriptions. Taharqa disputed this region with Sennacherib of Assyria.

The Egyptian Story of Wenamun refers to Kharu. According to Alessandra Nibbi, the expression "the great ym of Kharu" is often connected to the Mediterranean sea. But she was attempting to reinterpret this and other associated geographical names and to tie them to other locations.

== See also ==
- Horites
