= Sebek-khu Stele =

Egyptian Artefact

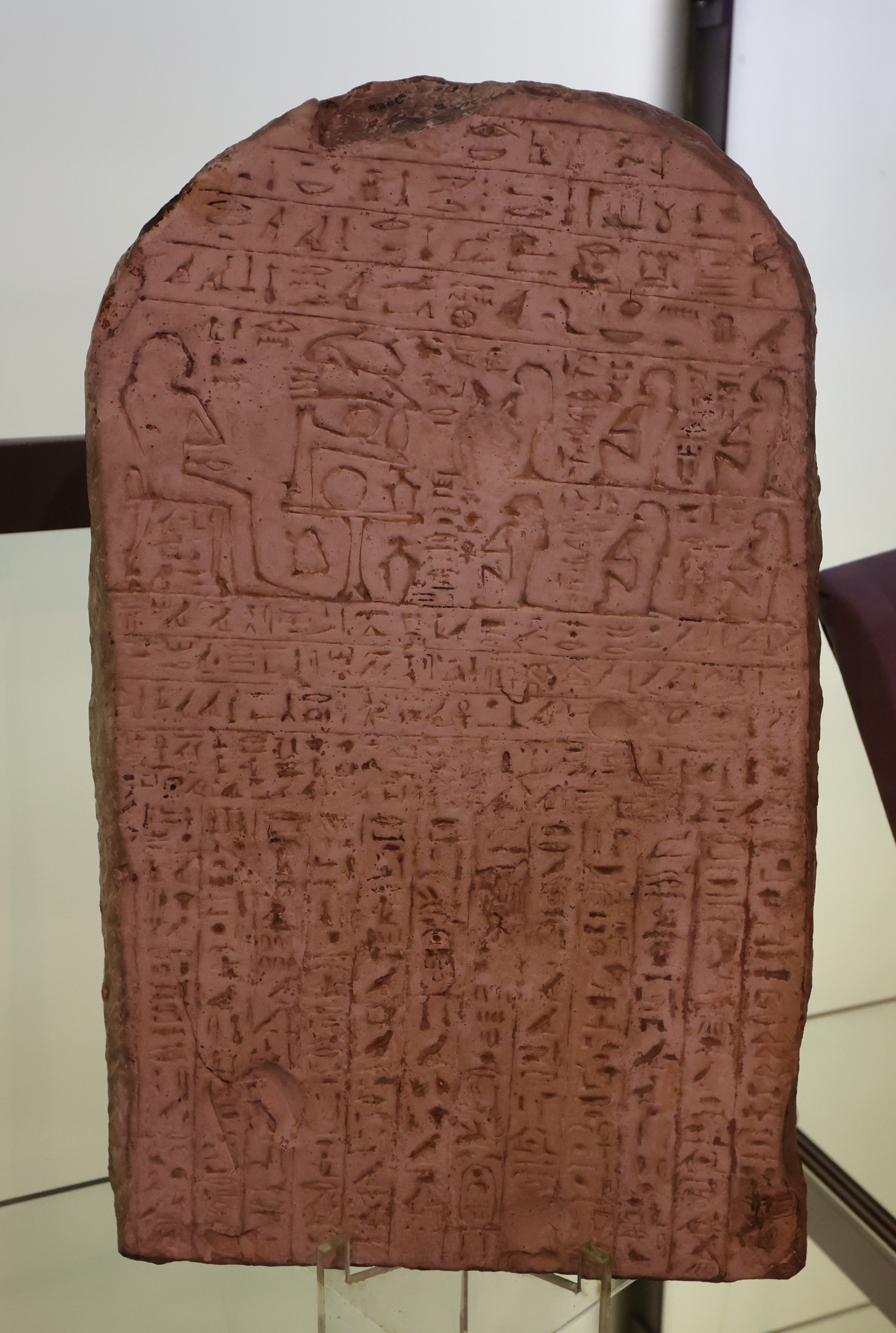
- Material: Limestone
- Writing: Egyptian
- Created: c. 1880–1840 BC
- Discovered: 1901; Abydos, Egypt
- Discovered by: John Garstang
- Present location: Manchester Museum
- Identification: 3306

The Sebek-khu Stele, also known as the Stele of Khu-sobek, is an inscription in honour of a man named Sebek-khu (Khu-sobek), who lived during the reign of Senusret III discovered by John Garstang in 1901 outside Khu-sobek's tomb at Abydos, Egypt, and now housed in the Manchester Museum.

The text is largely about Khu-sobek's life, and is historically important because it records the earliest known Egyptian military campaign in Canaan (or elsewhere in Asia). The text reads "His Majesty proceeded northward to overthrow the Asiatics. His Majesty reached a foreign country of which the name was Sekmem (...) Then Sekmem fell, together with the wretched Retenu", where Sekmem (s-k-m-m) is thought to be Shechem.
