= Retjenu =

Ancient Egyptian name for Canaan and Syria

Map of Western Asia r T n nw w N25 r T w N25 Retjenu (determ.-foreign land) in hieroglyphs

Retjenu (rṯnw; Reṯenu, Retenu), later known as Khor, was the Ancient Egyptian name for the wider Syrian region, where the Semitic-speaking Canaanites lived. Retjenu was located between the region north of the Sinai Desert and south of the Taurus Mountains in southern Anatolia. The term Retjenu was used to refer to this geographical area since the Middle Kingdom (c. 2000–1700 BCE). The geographical areas of Retjenu were defined during the New Kingdom (c. 1550–1069 BCE) and considered to have been a collection of small states ruled by princes. The boundaries of the area considered Retjenu shifted throughout time due to military, political, and economic factors. Retjenu was divided into two geographical regions. Djahy the southernmost region covered the area between Askalon and Mount Lebanon stretching inland to the Sea of Galilee. Amurru the northern region stretched between the Lebanon and Taurus Mountains. During Thutmose III's (1479–1425 BCE) military campaigns in West Asia, the area of Djahy was referred to as Upper Retjenu and generally covered the area of Canaan. Lower Retjenu was used to refer to the area of Amurru but also incorporated the cities located along Phoenician coast.

The Egyptian term "Aamu", translated as "Asiatic", was used to refer to the people originating from the Levant. In the Twelfth Dynasty (1991–1802 BCE) text Story of Sinuhe, "Aamu" is applied about the people of Retjenu. The term "Western Asiatic" has been used to refer to the people of Retjenu but can be used to generally refer to the lands now located in modern Turkey, Iran, Iraq, Syria, Lebanon, Jordan, Palestine, Israel, the Red Sea, and the Caucasus.

== References to Retjenu ==
=== Twelfth Dynasty ===
In the early Twelfth Dynasty text Tale of Sinuhe (c. 1875 BC) Retjenu is a main setting and referenced in name multiple times as a defined geographical region and applied to the identity of the people residing in the area. Retjenu referenced as a defined geographical area: "When Amunenshi carried me off. He was the ruler of upper Retjenu", "This decree of the king is brought to you to inform you that you are roving though countries, going from Qedem to Retjenu" and "Without calling Retjenu to mind-it is yours, even like your hounds!". The people residing in Retjenu are also referenced: "A hero of Retjenu came to provoke me in the tent; he was a peerless champion" and "When it was dawn, all Retjenu had come, having incited its tribes and gathered its neighboring countries".

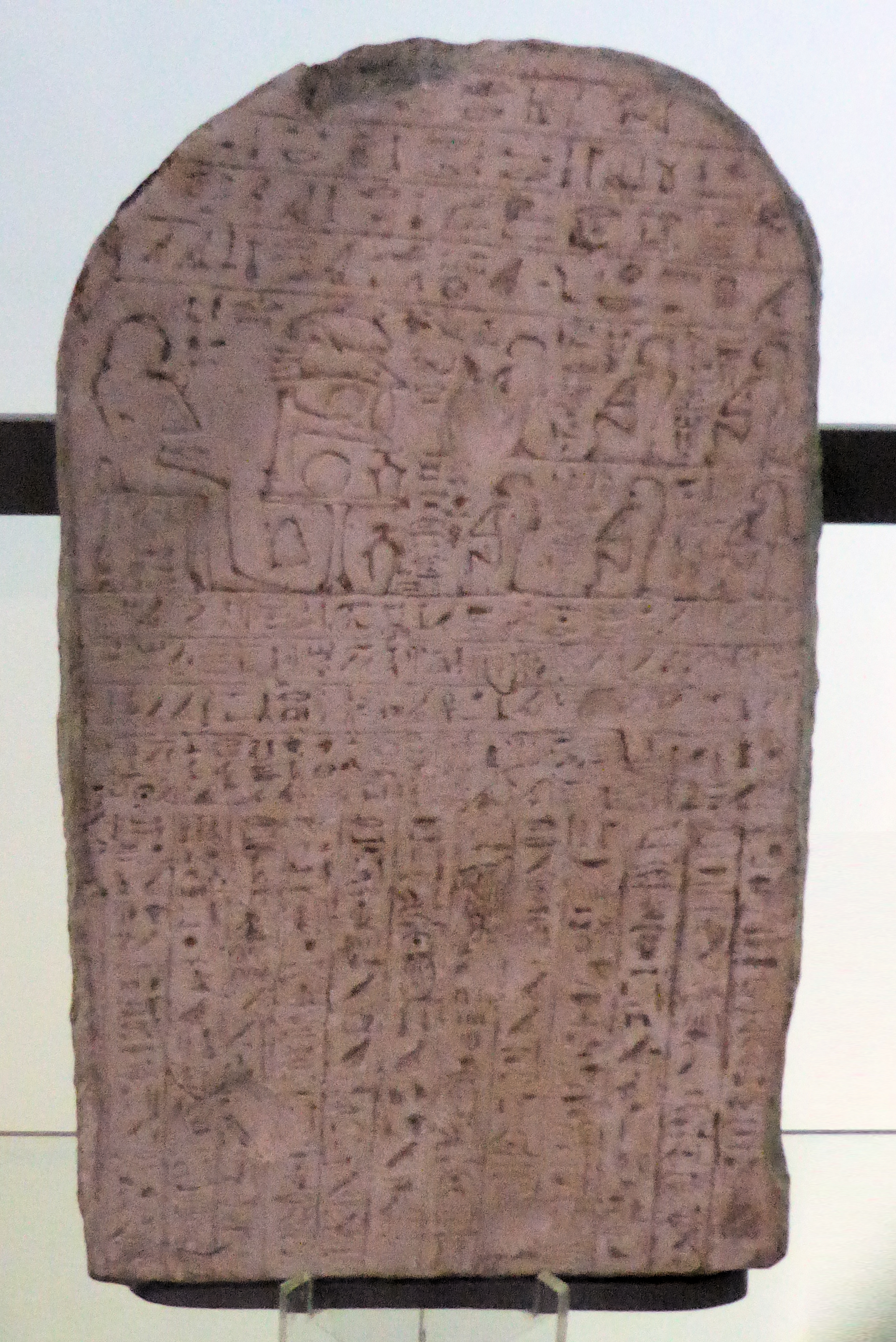
The Sebek-khu Stele, details the Egyptian military campaign of King Senusret III (1878 – 1839 BCE) in the Levant.

The earliest documented occurrence of the term Retjenu occurs in the military campaign record of King Senusret III on the Sebek-khu Stele, detailing an Egyptian victory over the people of Retjenu: "His Majesty proceeded northward to overthrow the Asiatics. His Majesty reached a foreign country of which the name was Sekmem (...) Then Sekmem fell, together with the wretched Retjenu".

An amethyst scarab seal featuring an inscription of a personal name, title, and the term Retjenu was discovered in the site of Tell el-Dab'a dating to the Twelfth Dynasty. The scarab seal would have been received either through trade or as a diplomatic gift from the court of Egypt's Twelfth Dynasty.

=== Seventeenth Dynasty ===
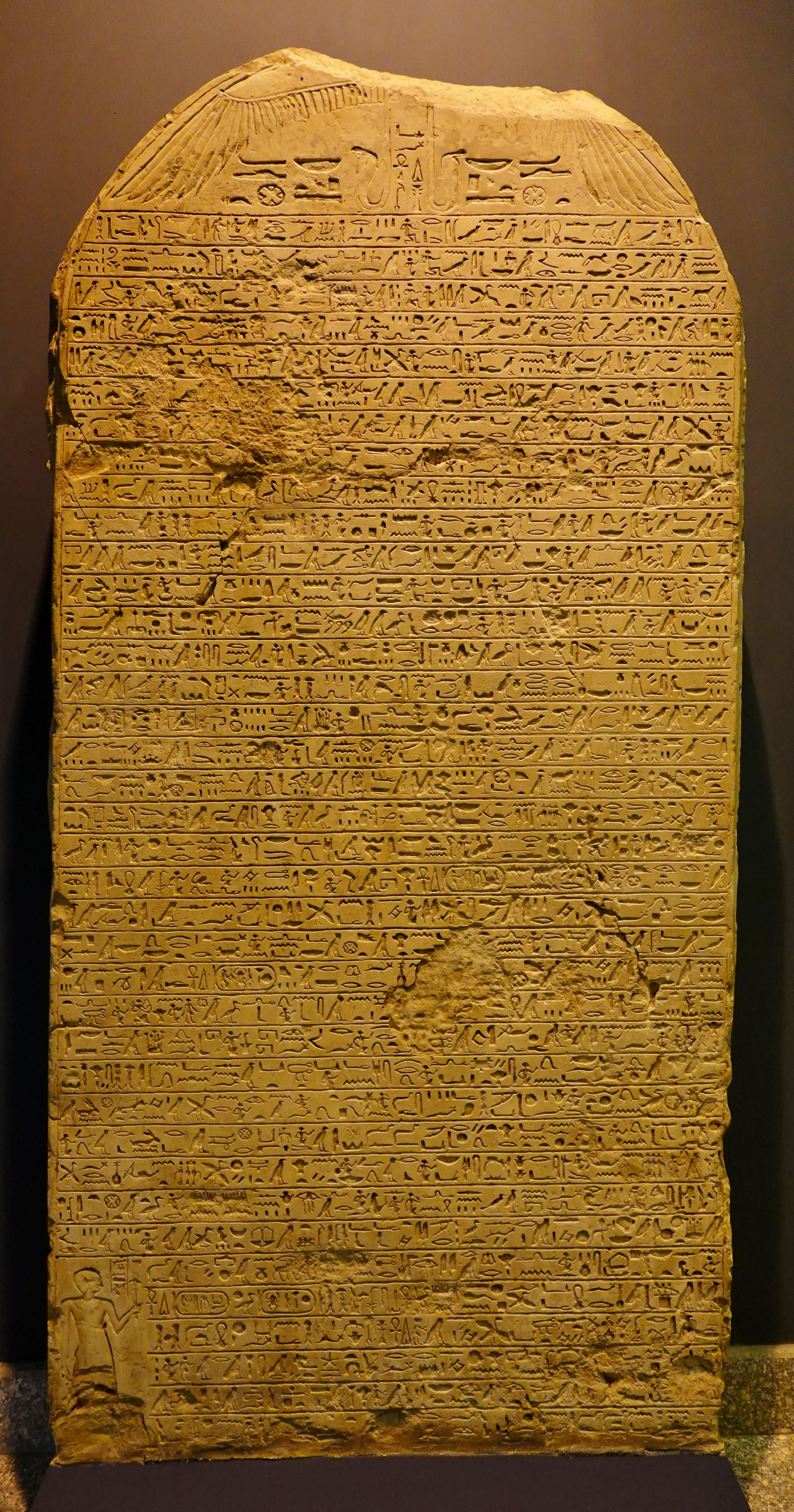
Victory stele of Kamose from the temple of Karnak (17th Dynasty, 1571-1569 B.C.),

The Second Stela of Kamose, the last king of the Theban 17th Dynasty (c. 1580-1550 BCE), refers to Apepi, a Hyksos Pharaoh, as a "Chieftain of Retjenu" {wr n rṯnw} implying a Canaanite background.

=== Eighteenth Dynasty ===
Within the Autobiography of Ahmose son of Abana, Retjenu is referenced in the section detailing the Syrian campaign of King Thutmose I: "After this (his majesty) proceeded to Retjenu to vent his wrath through the lands".

The Poetical Stela of Thutmose III within the Karnak Temple references Retjenu in the poem section of the stela: "I came to let you tread on those of Asia, to smite the Asians' heads in Retjenu".

The tomb of Rekhmire includes the "chiefs of Retjenu" in scenes depicting lines of foreigners prostrating, bowing, and carrying tribute on their backs, shoulders, or in front of them to be delivered to Thutmose III.

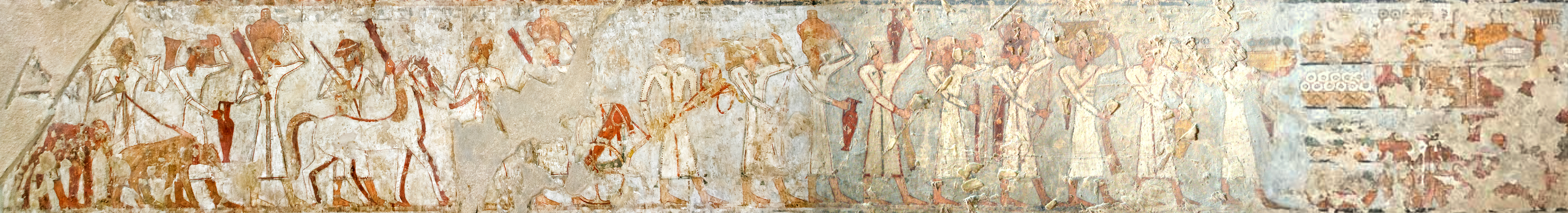
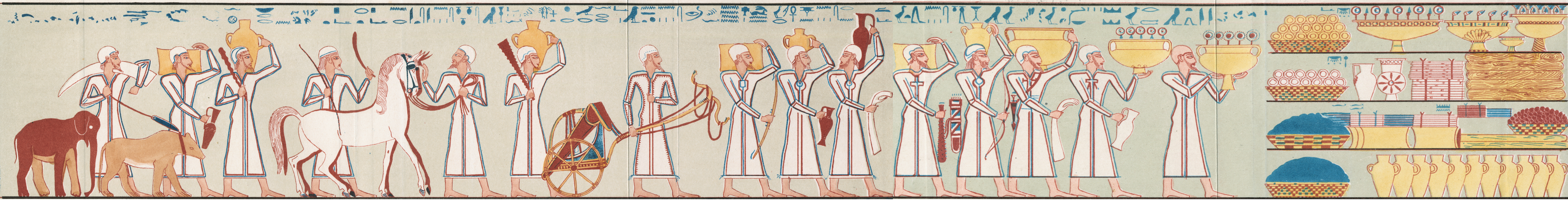
Syrians bringing presents to Tuthmosis III (18th Dynasty), in the tomb of Rekhmire, circa 1450 BCE (actual painting and interpretational drawing). They are labeled "Chiefs of Retjenu".

The tomb of Menkheperreseneb II depicts the chiefs of Retjenu among the chiefs of Keftiu, Hatti, and Qadesh leading rows of foreigners to deliver goods as tribute to Thutmose III. Similar to the depiction within the tomb of Rekhmire the rows of foreigners are depicted carrying their tribute in front or behind them.

The tomb of Amenemhab depicts the chiefs of foreign lands including Retjenu leading rows of foreigners to deliver tribute to Thutmose III. The foreigners are depicted carrying their tribute on their backs while some kneel and prostrate before Thutmose III.

The Stela of Amenhotep III within his mortuary temple in western Thebes references Retjenu in the section The Bark of Amun: "in making for [Amen-Re] a great bark upon the river, 'Amen-Re-firm-of-brow,' of new pine wood, cut by my majesty in the countries of god's land, and dragged from the mountains of Retjenu by the chiefs of all foreign lands".

A relief on a wall adjacent to the Tenth Pylon in the temple of Karnak depicts a scene of Horemheb presenting foreigners to deities. Depicted behind Horemheb are rows of bound and prostrating foreigners, among them are chiefs of Retjenu and Aegean islanders who express their fear of Horemheb.

=== Nineteenth Dynasty ===
Within the walls of hypostyle hall at Karnak the battle reliefs of Seti I include a reference to captives brought to Egypt from Retjenu: "The great chiefs of Retjenu the vile, whom His Majesty brought away by his [victo]ries over the foreign country of Hatti in order to fill the magazine [of] his noble [father], Amun-Re".

== Depictions of West Asians in Egyptian reliefs ==
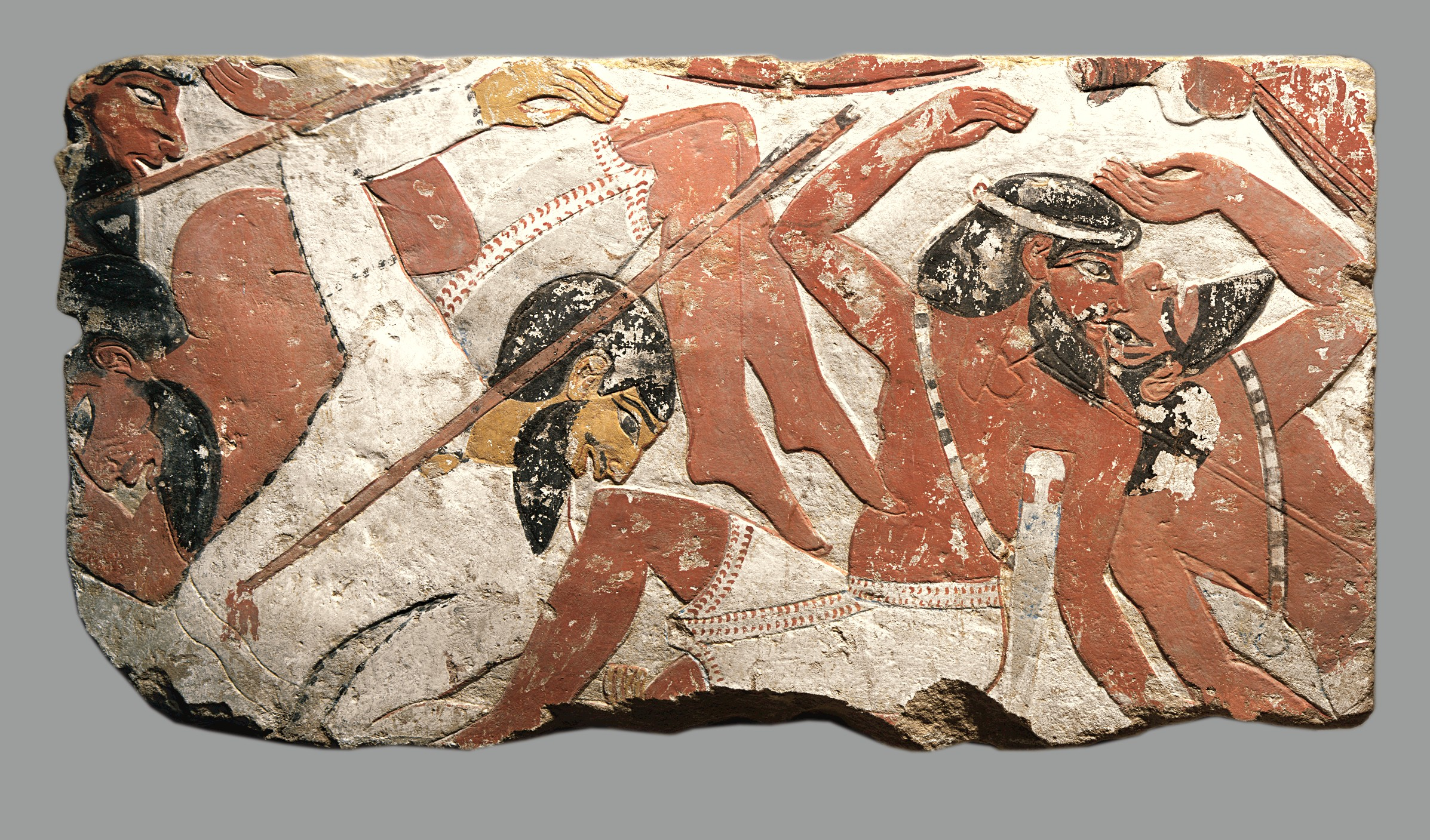
Egyptian relief depicting a battle against West Asiatics. Reign of Amenhotep II, Eighteenth Dynasty, c. 1427–1400 BCE

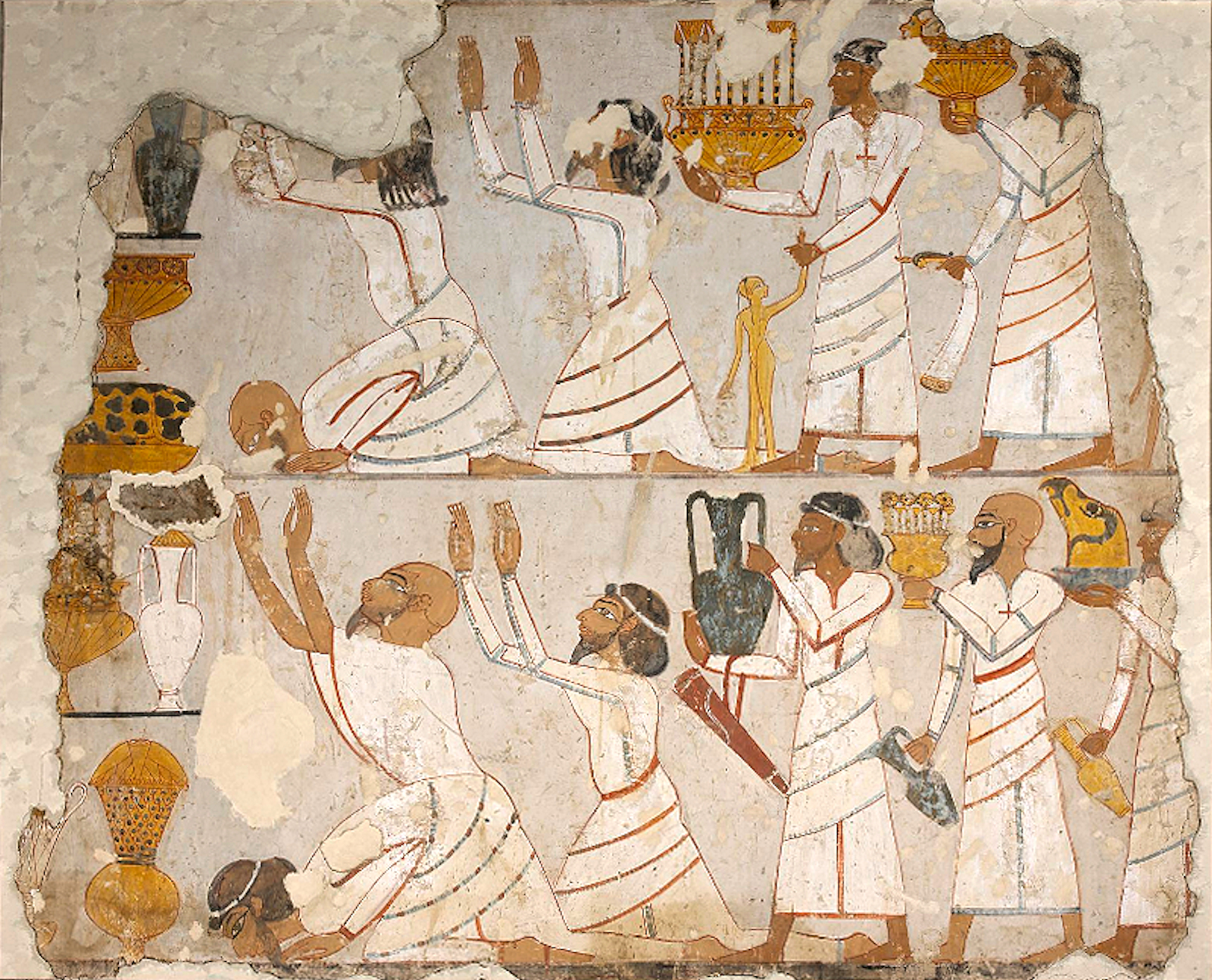
West Asiatic tribute bearers in the tomb of Sobekhotep, c. 1400 BCE, during the reign of Thutmose IV, Thebes. British Museum.

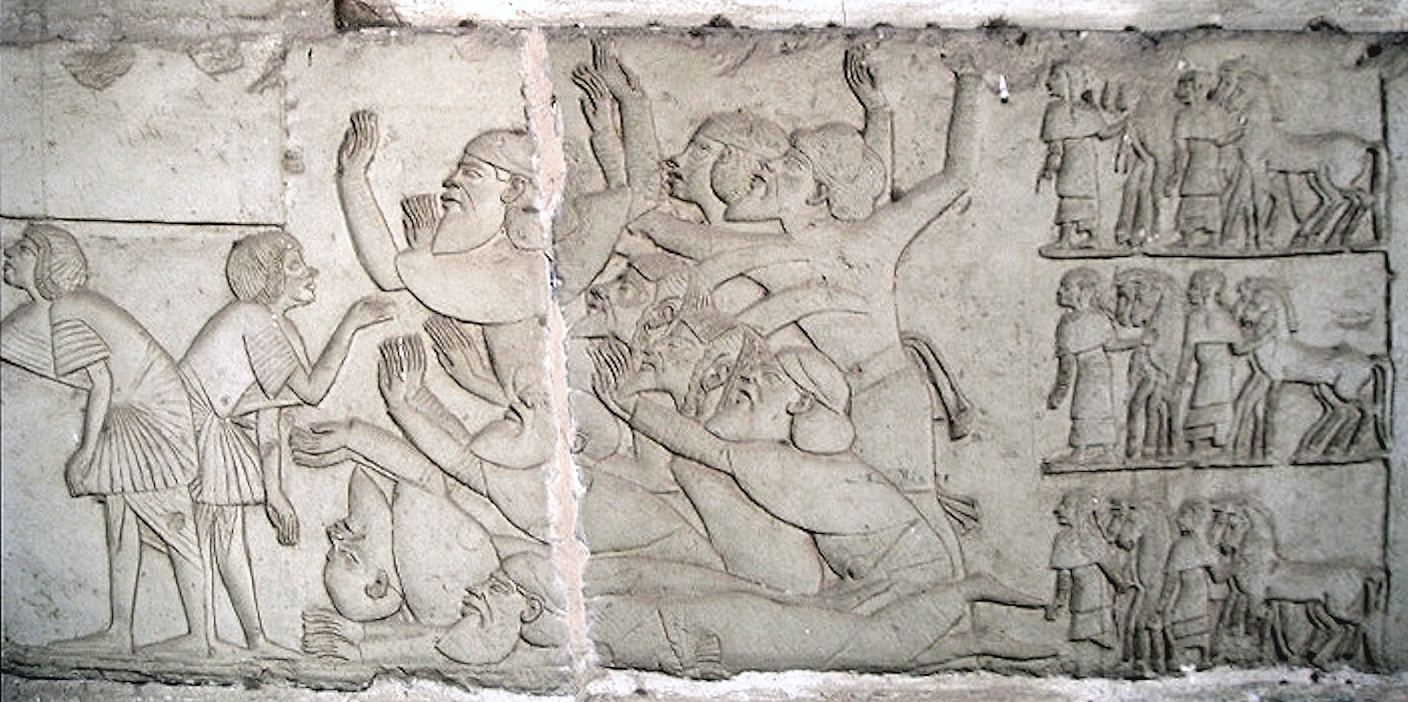
Submission of West Asiatics on the tomb of Pharaoh Horemheb at Saqqara, circa 1300 BCE.

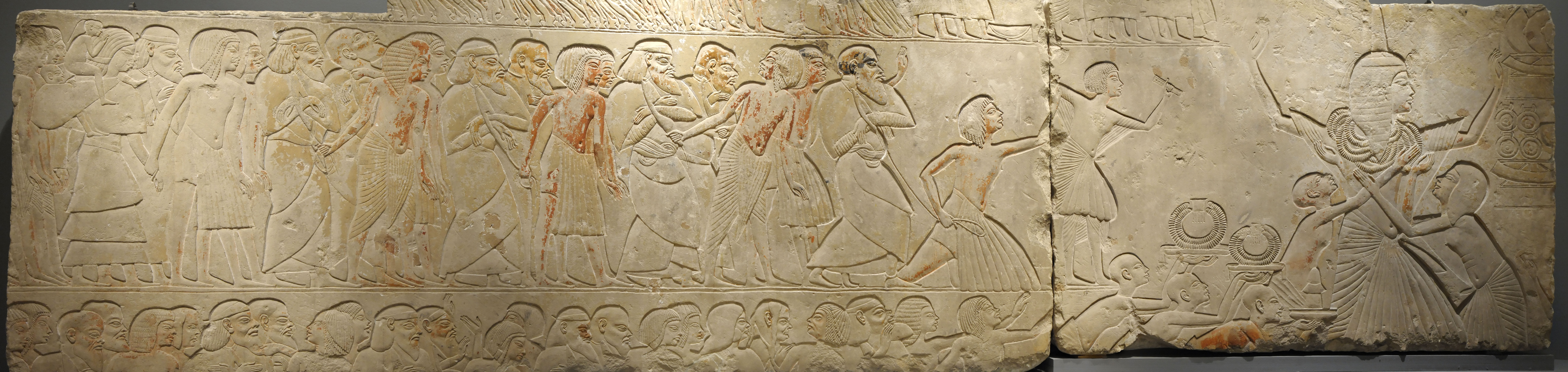
Submission of West Asiatics on the tomb of Pharaoh Horemheb at Saqqara, circa 1300 BCE.

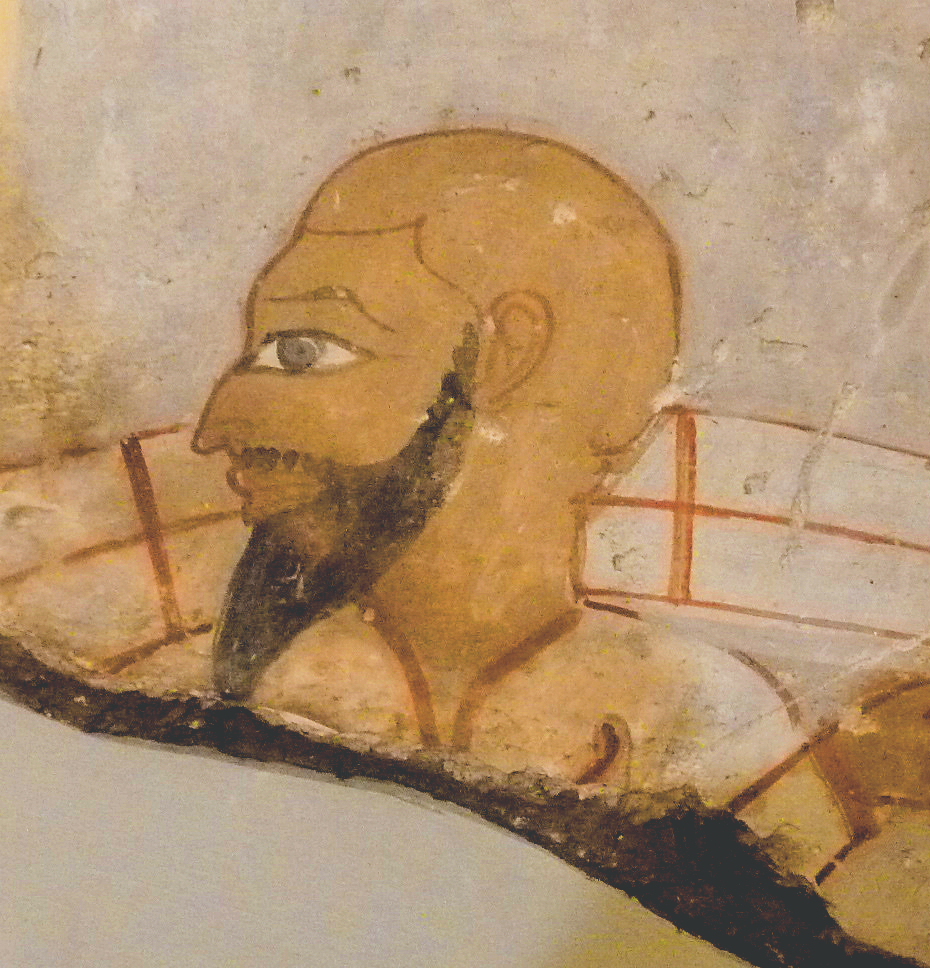
Syrian tribute bearer from a Theban tomb of the 18-19th dynasty.

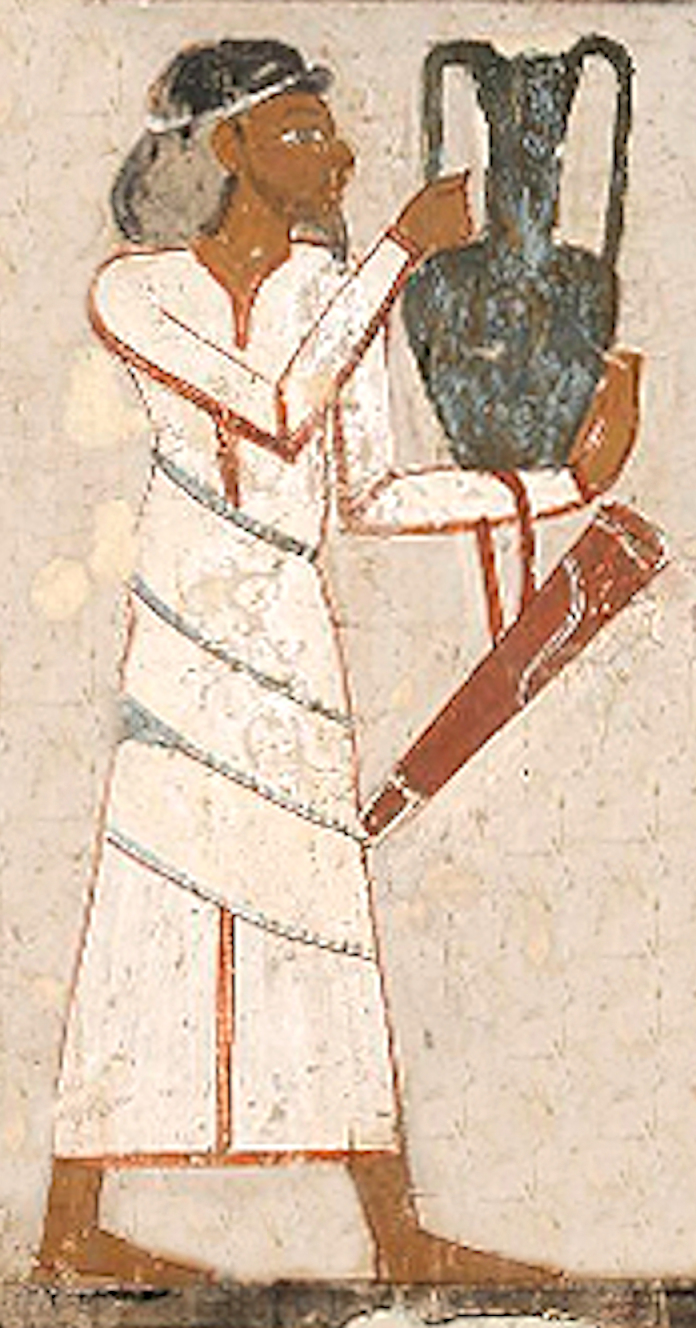
A Retjenu. Tomb of Sobekhotep, 18th Dynasty Thebes.

== See also ==
- Aamu
- Amurru
- Djahy
