= Berlin pedestal relief =

Pedestal of Ancient Egyptian statue

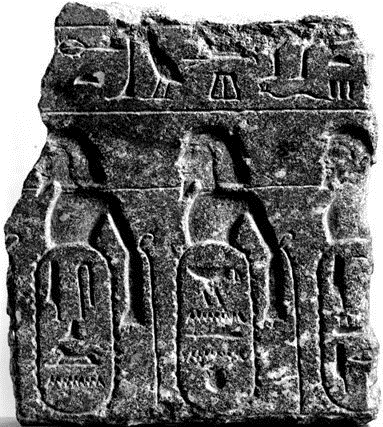
- Material: Granite
- Height: c. 46 cm
- Width: c. 40 cm
- Created: During the 18th or 19th Dynasty of Egypt
- Discovered: 1913
- Discovered by: Ludwig Borchardt
- Present location: Egyptian Museum of Berlin, Berlin, Germany

The Berlin pedestal relief is part of the base of a granite pedestal of an unprovenanced Ancient Egyptian statue containing an inscription describing Egypt's war victories. According to the German archaeologist Manfred Gorg, the inscription on the pedestal may have originally contained one of the oldest known references to Israel, older than the inscription in the Merneptah Stele by two centuries. The artifact is kept in the Egyptian Museum of Berlin (ÄM 21687).

== Description ==
In 1913, a fragment of the pedestal base was purchased from an antiquities trader named M. Nachman by Egyptologist Ludwig Borchardt along with another granite pedestal relief of similar size (50 × 38 cm, ÄM 21688). The preserved fragment measures around 40 × 46 cm. The preserved part shows three prisoners tied with a rope around their necks. Each prisoner has a cartouche with the name of his country of origin:

- The first cartouche (on the left, jsqrwn) may refer to Ashkelon
- The middle cartouche (kynꜥꜣnnw) refers to Canaan
- The last cartouche (on the right, j...šꜣjr) is partially broken off. In 2001, Manfred Görg proposed that the missing mark was a symbol of a vulture (Gardiner sign G1, representing Egyptian alef); further imaging studies have added weight to this assessment. Görg suggested that the word would then read "Israel", but even with the vulture sign such a spelling of the word Israel would be unique in the Egyptian texts.

The proposal that Berlin pedestal (ÄM 21687) may contain a reference to Israel has been rejected by James Hoffmeier and other scholars.

== Dating ==
The dating of the Berlin pedestal is difficult to establish because it was not discovered in situ and has no provenance. Despite containing just a few words, it contains many spelling differences versus previously known inscriptions. Based on the writing itself, the Berlin pedestal is reminiscent of a spelling from the 18th Dynasty of Egypt in the time period c. 1550-1292 BC Considering the historical reality of central highlands of Canaan and New Kingdom's Pharaohs' conquests, some researchers proposed that the Berlin pedestal was most likely written during the reign of Horemheb or Ramessess II as there was no Israel-like entity in the central highlands during the early and mid-18th Dynasty of Egypt, none of the Pharaohs from this period, e.g., Thutmose III, Amenhotep III, etc. recorded such entity in their topographical lists, and only Horemheb and Ramessess II are among the Pharaohs after this period who made military conquests in the central highlands of Canaan.

== Bibliography ==
- Gorg, M. (1974). Untersuchungen zur hieroglyphischen Wiedergabe palastinischer Ortsnamen. Bonner orientalistische Studien; neue Serie, no. 29 (in German). Selbstverlag des Orientalischen Seminars der Universitat.
- Manfred Görg: Israel in Hieroglyphen. In: Biblische Notizen'. Band 106, 2001, S. 21–27.
- Edel, E.; Görg, M. (2005). Die Ortsnamenlisten im nördlichen Säulenhof des Totentempels Amenophis' III. Ägypten und Altes Testament (in German). Harrassowitz in Kommission. ISBN 978-3-447-05219-1.
