= Hill-country (hieroglyph) =

Egyptian hieroglyph

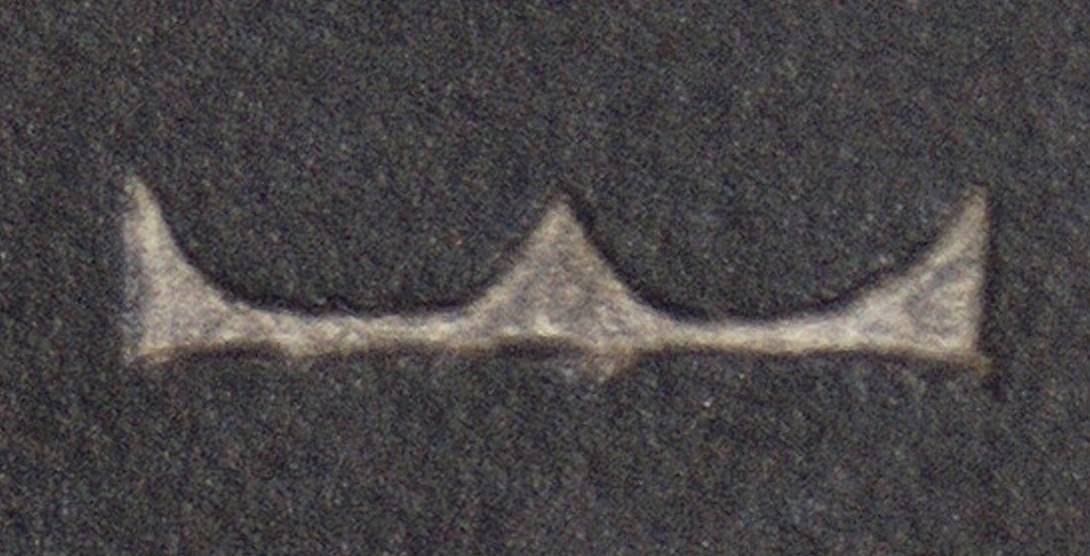
Hill-country hieroglyph

N25
3-Hills
" hilly-country "
in hieroglyphs

The ancient Egyptian Hill-country or "Foreign land" hieroglyph (𓈉) is a member of the sky, earth, and water hieroglyphs. A form of the hieroglyph in color, has a green line-(banding) at the base of the hieroglyph. The hieroglyph refers to the hills, and mountains, on both sides of the Nile River, and thus the green references the verdant black farming land adjacent to the river proper. It is coded N25 in Gardiner's sign list, and U+13209 in Unicode. It is a determinative hieroglyph, simply conveying a meaning, and has no phonetic value.

Various colors, and patterning, may adorn the rest of the hieroglyph when the bottom is green.

== Three major uses ==
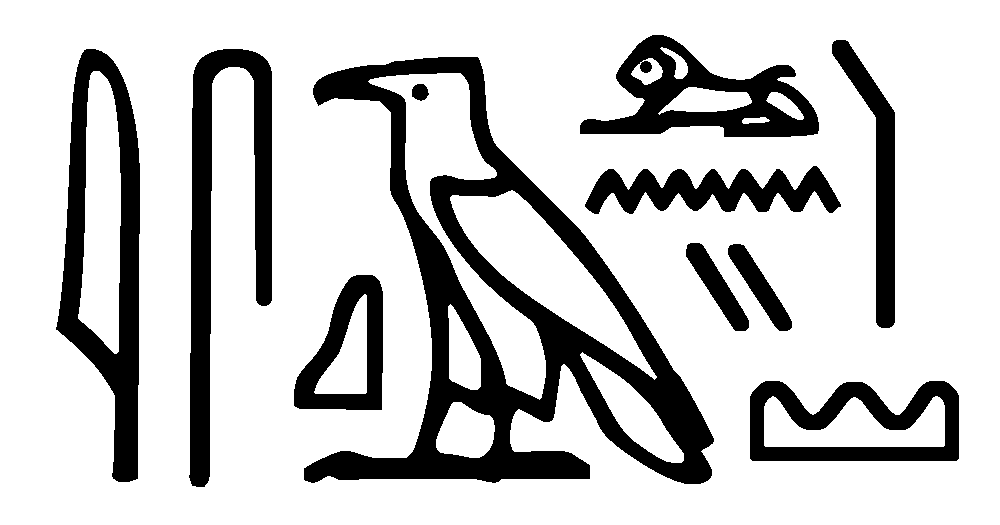
Ashqelon as mentioned on Merneptah Stele: iskeluni-(using hieroglyphs n, and two-determ.

The ancient language hilly land hieroglyph has three major uses:

1 – hill country, or hills
2 – a reference to arid, desert land
3 – Determinative, for foreign lands

The language meaning of the hieroglyph is as an ideogram or a determinative in the word khast (khaset), and is often translated as hilly land, desert, foreign land, or district.

=== Use as determinative ===
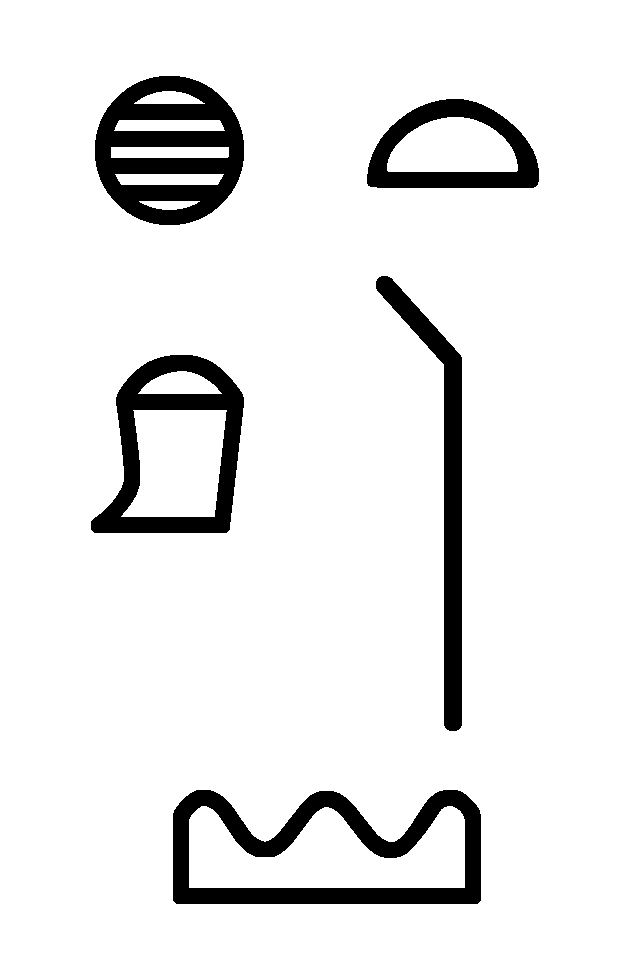
Name of Hatti in hieroglyphs. (from Merneptah Stele)

One major use of the hill-country hieroglyph is as the determinative for land, but especially the names of foreign lands. For example in the Merneptah Stele, foreign lands are mentioned, including the name of Hatti.

==== Partial list with land determinative ====
List of uses of the foreign land determinative:

- Ashkelon
- Canaan
- Hatti
- Retjenu
- Parthia 𓊪𓃭𓍘𓇋𓍯𓈉, p-rw-t-i-wꜣ
- Kingdom of Kush 𓎡𓄿𓈙𓈉, kꜣš
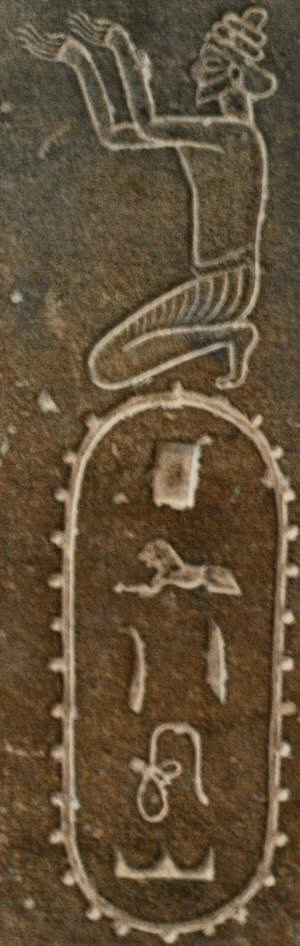
Parthia (𓊪𓃭𓍘𓇋𓍯𓈉, P-rw-t-i-wꜣ), as one of the 24 subjects of the Achaemenid Empire, in the Egyptian Statue of Darius I.

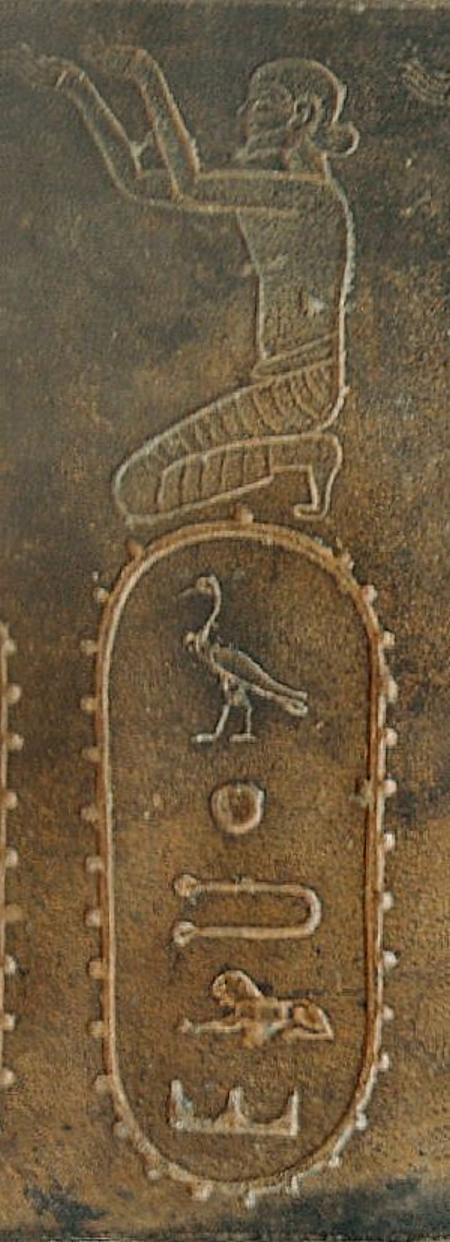
Representation of Bactria of the Egyptian Statue of Darius I.

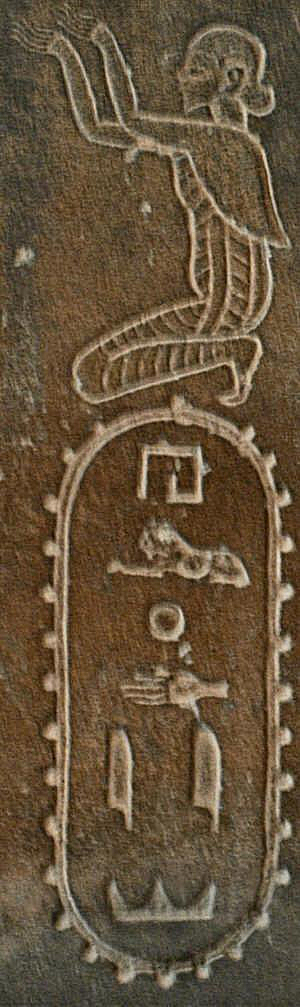
𓉔𓃭𓐍𓂧𓇌𓈉
h-rw-ḫ-d-y
Gandhara

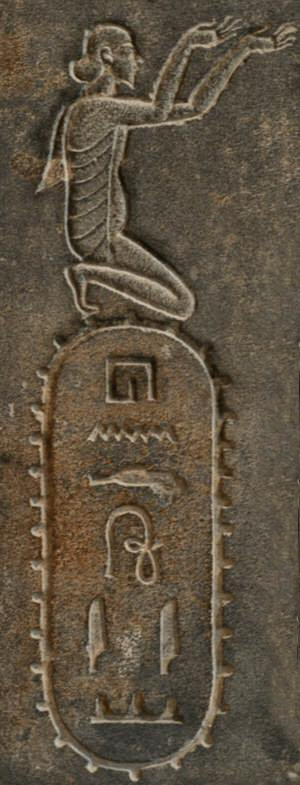
Hindush among the Achaemenid satrapies on the Statue of Darius I.𓉔𓈖𓂧𓍯𓇌𓈉
H-n-d-wꜣ-y
Hindush/India

== The Nine bows (foreigners or rebels) ==
N25 t Z1 Z1 Z1 Z1 Z1 Z1 Z1 Z1 Z1
the Nine foreign lands
in hieroglyphs

One spelling of the foreign peoples, the Nine bows, is represented by the Hill country hieroglyph, "t", and nine single strokes. The nine foreign lands used for the Nine Bows are also iconographically shown inside of cartouches, with their names. The cartouches are the 'bodies' of the "prisoner", or "captive", arms tied behind the back, the name of the land/city inside the cartouche.

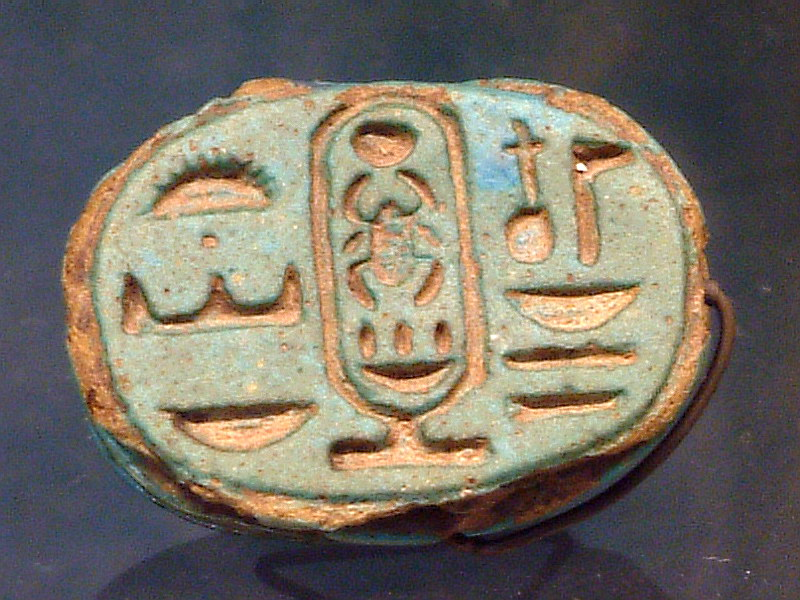
Pharaonic ring

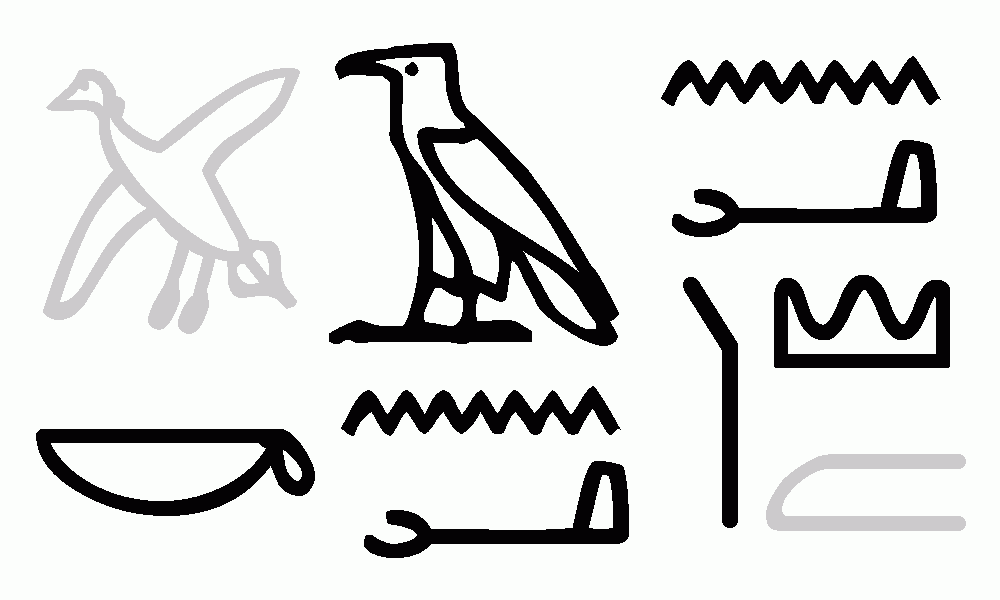
Canaan-(K-a-n-a-n-a)

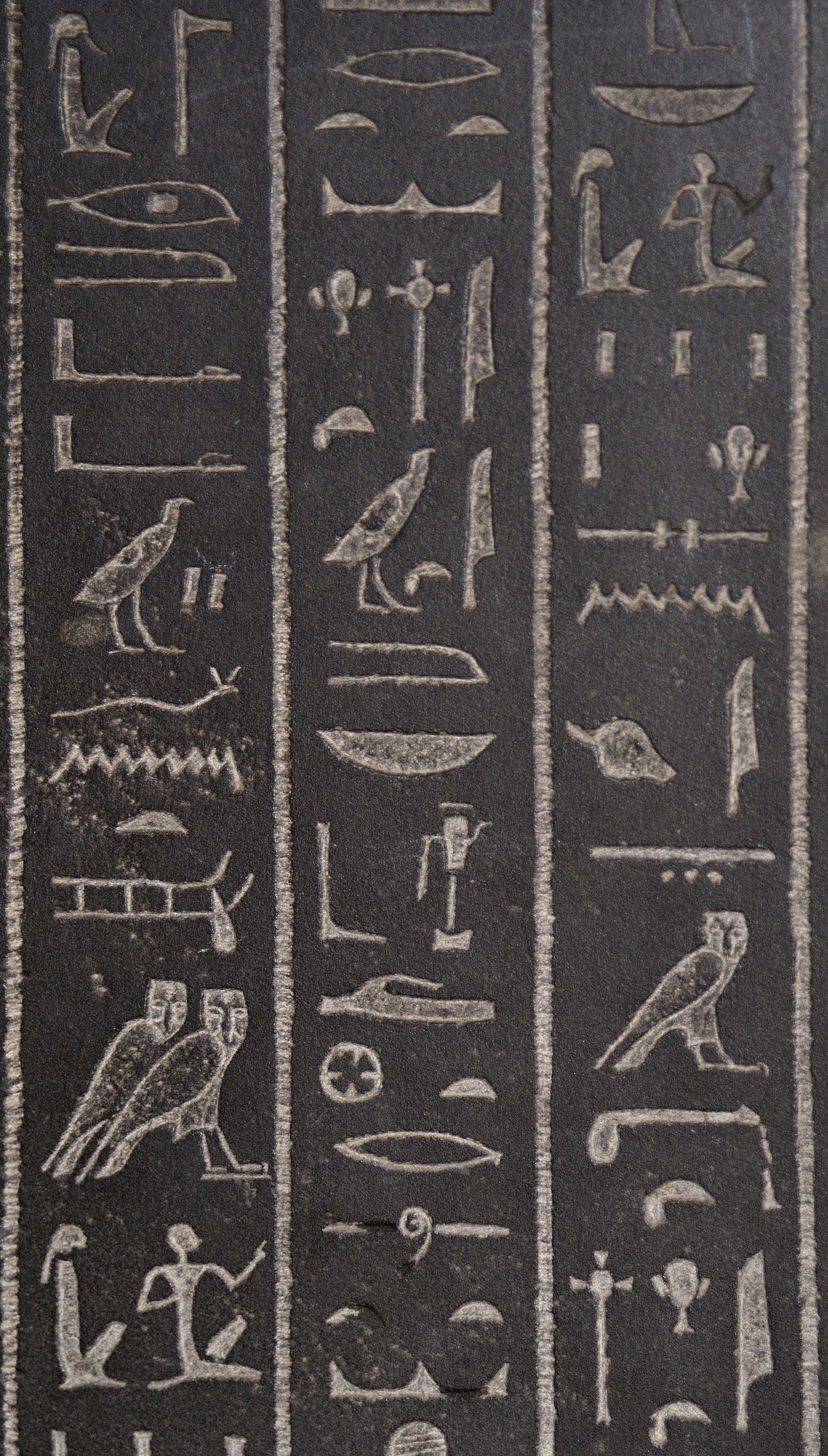
Sarcophagus inscribed for Ankhnesneferibre, Divine Adoratrice of Amun
God's Wife of Amun

== See also ==
- Gardiner's Sign List#N. Sky, Earth, Water
- List of Egyptian hieroglyphs
