= Merneptah Stele =

Inscription by the ancient Egyptian pharaoh Merneptah

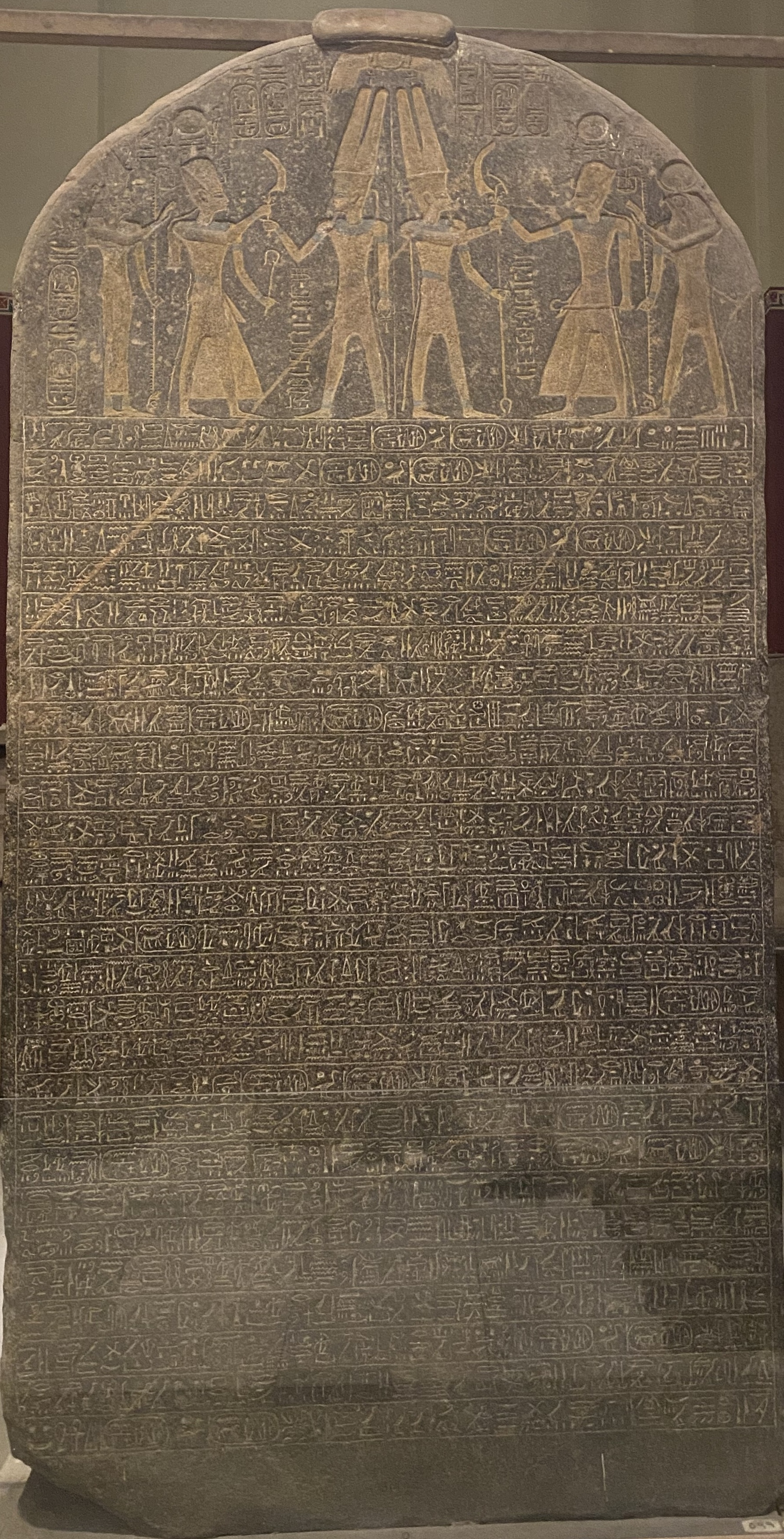
- The stele in 2023
- Material: Granite
- Writing: Ancient Egyptian hieroglyphs
- Created: c. 1208 BCE
- Discovered: 1896; Thebes, Egypt; 25°43′14″N 32°36′37″E
- Discovered by: Flinders Petrie
- Present location: Egyptian Museum, Cairo
- Identification: JE 31408
- Period: New Kingdom of Egypt

Location
- The Merneptah Stele was discovered in Thebes and is currently housed in Cairo, Egypt

The Merneptah Stele, also known as the Israel Stele or the Victory Stele of Merneptah, is an inscription by Merneptah, a pharaoh in ancient Egypt who reigned from 1213 to 1203 BCE. Discovered by Flinders Petrie at Thebes in 1896, it is now housed at the Egyptian Museum in Cairo.

The text is largely an account of Merneptah's victory over the ancient Libyans and their allies, but the last three of the 28 lines deal with a separate campaign in Canaan, then part of Egypt's imperial possessions. It is sometimes referred to as the "Israel Stele" because a majority of scholars translate a set of hieroglyphs in line 27 as "Israel". Alternative translations have been advanced but are not widely accepted.

The stele represents the earliest textual reference to Israel and the only reference from ancient Egypt. It is one of four known inscriptions from the Iron Age that date to the time of and mention ancient Israel by name, with the others being the Mesha Stele, the Tel Dan Stele, and the Kurkh Monoliths. Consequently, some consider the Merneptah Stele to be Petrie's most famous discovery, an opinion with which Petrie himself concurred.

== Description and context ==
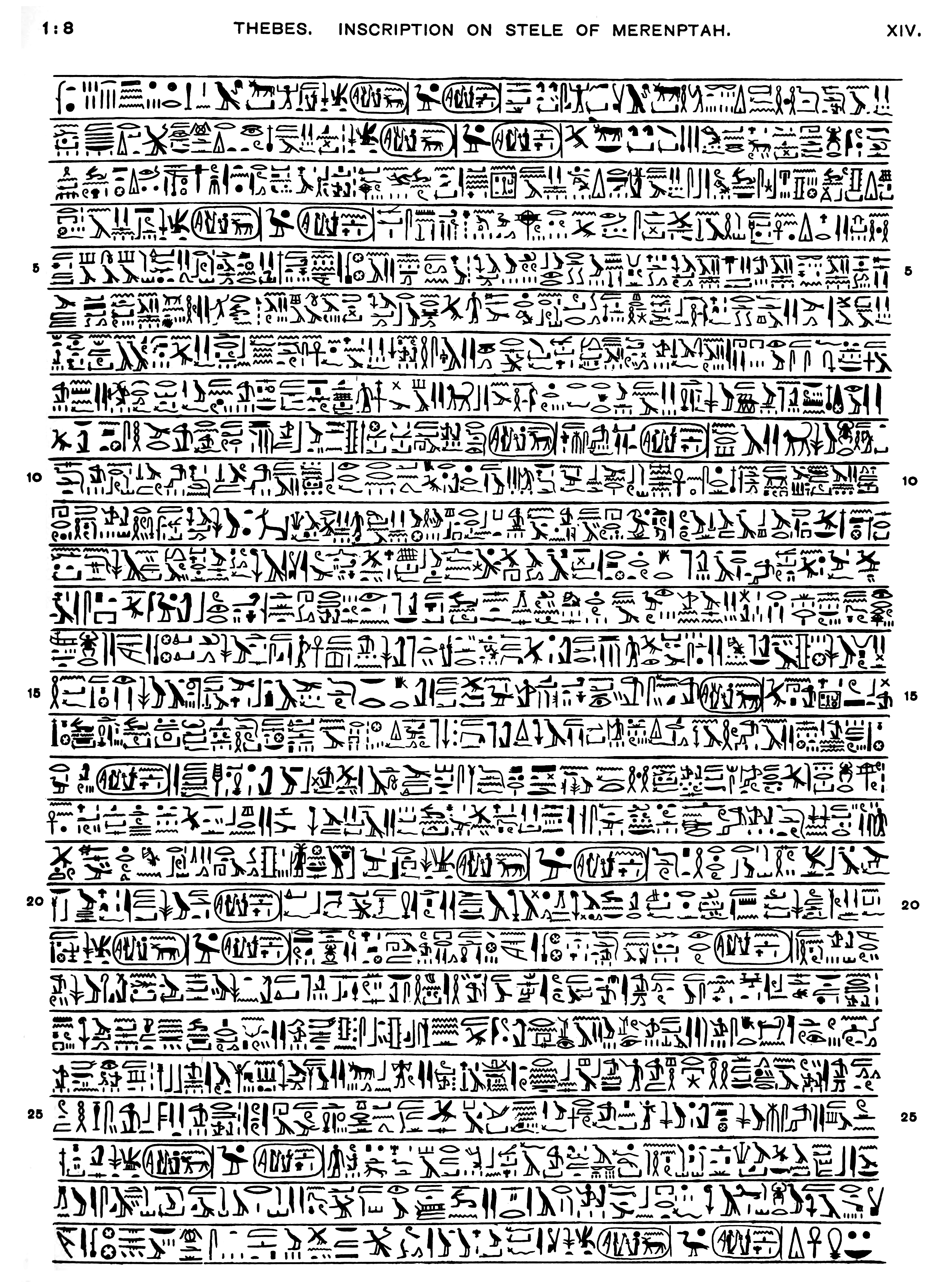
Flinders Petrie's 1897 mirror image copy of the main part of the inscription (all 28 lines)

The stele was discovered in 1896 by Flinders Petrie in the ancient Egyptian city of Thebes, and first translated by Wilhelm Spiegelberg. In his "Inscriptions" chapter of Petrie's 1897 publication "Six Temples at Thebes," Spiegelberg described the stele as "engraved on the rough back of the stele of Amenhotep III, which was removed from his temple and placed back outward, against the wall, in the forecourt of the temple of Merneptah. Owing to the rough surface, and the poor cutting, the readings in many places require careful examination... The scene at the top retains its original colouring of yellow, red, and blue. Amun is shown giving a sword to the king, who is backed by Mut on one side and by Khonsu on the other".

Now in the collection of the Egyptian Museum at Cairo, the stele is a black granite slab, over 3 meters (10 feet) high, and the inscription says it was carved in the 5th year of Merneptah of the 19th dynasty. Most of the text glorifies Merneptah's victories over enemies from Libya and their Sea People allies. The final two lines mention a campaign in Canaan, where Merneptah says he defeated and destroyed Asqaluna, Gezer, Yanoam and Israel.

Egypt was the dominant power in the region during the long reign of Merneptah's predecessor, Ramesses II, but Merneptah and one of his nearest successors, Ramesses III, faced significant invasions. The problems began in Merneptah's 5th year (1208 BCE), when a Libu king invaded Egypt from the west in alliance with various northern peoples. Merneptah achieved a great victory in the summer of that year, and the inscription is mainly about this. The final lines deal with a separate campaign in the East, where some of the Canaanite cities had revolted. Traditionally the Egyptians had concerned themselves only with cities, so the problem presented by Israel must have been something new – possibly attacks on Egypt's vassals in Canaan. Merneptah and Ramesses III fought off their enemies, but it was the beginning of the end of Egypt's control over Canaan – the last evidence of an Egyptian presence in the area is the name of Ramesses VI (1141–1133 BC) inscribed on a statue base from Megiddo.

== Canaanite campaign ==
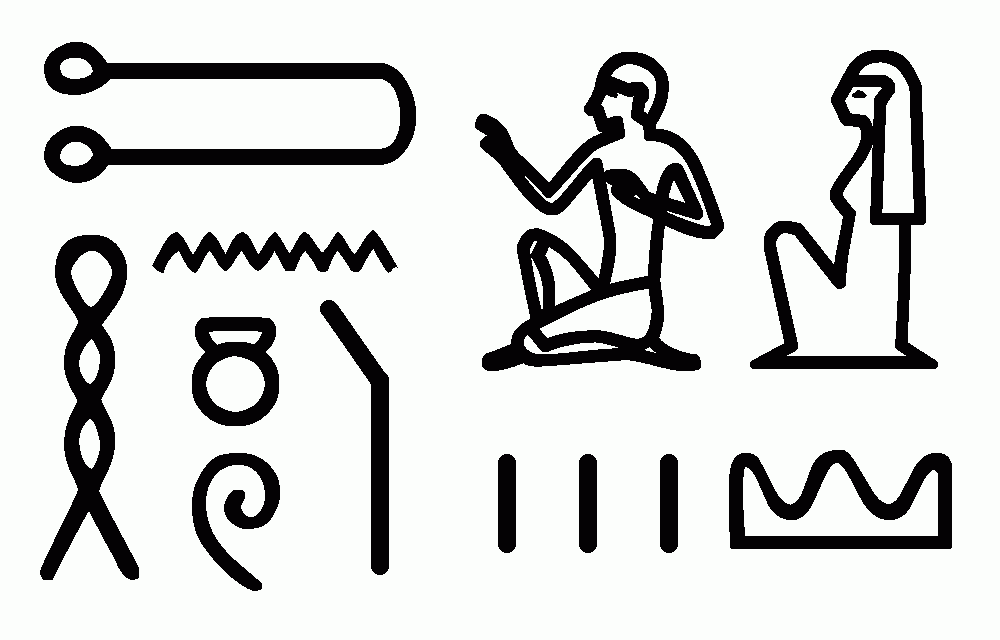
Libyans (Tjeḥenu) are described by determinatives: foreign person + people + foreign country (=state/country of Libyan people)

The bulk of the inscription deals with Merneptah's victory over the Libyans, but the closing lines shift to Canaan:

The princes are prostrate, saying 'Peace!'
Not one raises his head among the Nine Bows.
Desolation is for Tjehenu;
Hatti is pacified;
Plundered is the Canaan with every evil;
Carried off is Asqaluni;
Seized upon is Gezer;
Yanoam is made non-existent;
Israel is laid waste—its seed is no more;
Kharru has become a widow because of Egypt.
All lands together are pacified.
Everyone who was restless has been bound.

The "nine bows" is a term the Egyptians used to refer to their enemies; the actual enemies varied according to time and circumstance. Hatti and Ḫurru represented the entirety of Levant, Canaan and Israel were smaller units within the region, -Canaan might here refer to the city of Gaza,- and Asqaluni, Gezer and Yanoam were cities within the region. Based on their determinatives, Canaan referred to the land whilst Israel referred to the people.

== Israel reference ==
Petrie called upon Wilhelm Spiegelberg, a German philologist in his archaeological team, to translate the inscription. Spiegelberg was puzzled by one symbol towards the end, that of a people or tribe whom Merneptah (also written Merenptah) had victoriously smitten – I.si.ri.ar? Petrie quickly suggested that it read "Israel!" Spiegelberg agreed that this translation must be correct. "Won't the reverends be pleased?" remarked Petrie. At dinner that evening, Petrie, who realized the importance of the find, said: "This stele will be better known in the world than anything else I have found." The news of its discovery made headlines when it reached the English papers.

The line which refers to Israel is below (shown in reverse to match the English translation; the original Egyptian is in right-to-left script):

i i z Z1s Z1s r i A r Z1 T14 A1 B1 Z2s	f k t G37 (Note: In the original text, the bird (a sparrow) is placed below the t sign (a semicircle) but for reasons of legibility, the bird is here placed next to the t sign.)	b n	O1 r t N33B Z2	f
Ỉsrỉȝr	fk.t	bn	pr.t	=f
Ysriar	feket	ben	peret	-ef
Israel	waste	[negative]	seed/grain	his/its

=== Determinative ===
While Asqaluni, Gezer and Yanoam are given the determinative for a city – a throw stick plus three mountains – the hieroglyphs that refer to Israel instead employ the throw stick (the determinative for "foreign") plus a sitting man and woman (the determinative for "people") over three vertical lines (a plural marker):

T14 A1 B1 Z2s

The determinative "people" has been the subject of significant scholarly discussion. As early as 1955, John A. Wilson wrote, of the idea that this determinative means the "'ysrỉꜣr" were a people: "The argument is good, but not conclusive, because of the notorious carelessness of Late-Egyptian scribes and several blunders of writing in this stela". This sentiment was subsequently built upon by other scholars.

According to The Oxford History of the Biblical World, this "foreign people ... sign is typically used by the Egyptians to signify nomadic groups or peoples, without a fixed city-state home, thus implying a seminomadic or rural status for 'Israel' at that time". (Note: Whether the Egyptian scribes used these determinatives consistently in general and in the Merneptah Stele in particular, is in itself a matter of some debate.) The phrase "wasted, bare of seed" is formulaic, and often used of defeated nations – it implies that the grain-store of the nation in question has been destroyed, which would result in a famine the following year, incapacitating them as a military threat to Egypt.

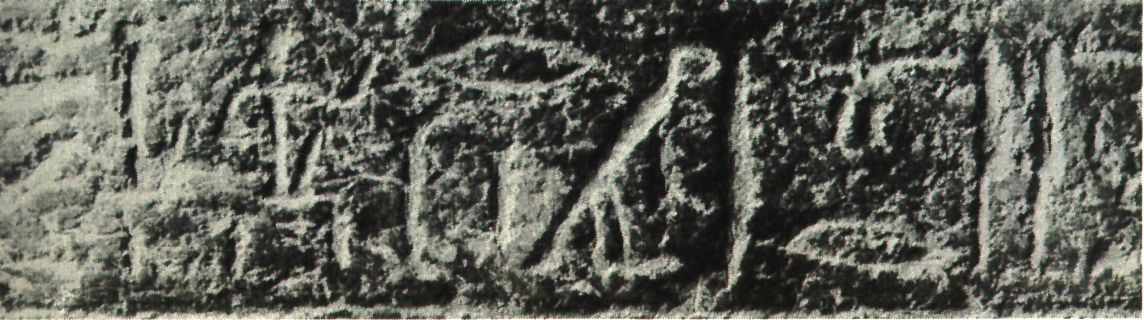
A portion of line 27, translated as "Israel [foreign people]"

According to James Hoffmeier, "no Egyptologists would ever read the signs of a foreign ethnic entity as indicating a foreign land, but a people group".

In contrast to this apparent Israelite statelessness, the other Canaanite groups fought by Egypt (Asqaluni, Gezer, and Yano'am) are described in the stele as nascent states.

=== Alternative translations ===
Alternatives to the reading "Israel" have been put forward since the stele's discovery, the two primary candidates being as follows:

- "Jezreel", a city and valley in northern Canaan;
- A continuation of the description of Libya referring to "wearers of the sidelock" (Note: Nibbi suggests that the first character in "I.si.ri.ar" was misread – rather than G1, Nibbi suggests G4, and that such an amendment would allow the characters to be translated as "wearers of the sidelock", which refers to Libyans in other sources such as the Book of Gates. Nibbi supports this by noting that the male figure has an apparent outgrowth of hair on the side of his head.)

However, these remain minority interpretations, (Note: Hasel (2008): "The view that the term ysry·r/l is a possible territory within Canaan but not associated with biblical Israel was proposed by Othniel Margalith (1990). His conclusions are based on the suggestion by G. R. Driver (1948: 135) that the Egyptian letter 's' in the word could also represent the Hebrew zayin. Accordingly, the name ysry·r/l could be translated as Iezreel "which might be an inexperienced way of rendering Yezreel, the valley to the north of the country" (Margalith 1990: 229). As others have pointed out elsewhere, Margalith's attempts to identify the entity ysry·r/l with Israel or Jezreel through Ugaritic vocalizations and a Sumerian title of a king are not convincing for an Egyptian inscription with a clear context for this entity in Canaan (Hasel 1994: 46; 1998a: 196–97; compare Kitchen 1966a: 91)." and "The suggestion of equating the ysry·r/l of the stela with Jezreel has now been taken up anew by I. Hjelm and Thomas L. Thompson (2002: 14) without any reference to earlier discussions. The identification is rife with difficulties. First, the Egyptian signs for "bolt" (Gardiner 1957: 507, O34) and "folded cloth" (Gardiner 1957: 507, S29) in Old Egyptian represented the sound s. In the New Kingdom, Hebrew zayin is rendered q or t in Egyptian and not s (Kitchen 1966a: 91, 1966b 59; Helck 1971: 18, 554, 589). Second, ysry·r/l does not include the Egyptian equivalent of ayin needed for the reading yzrªl. Third, the reading "Jezreel" must assume that the determinative for people used with ysry·r/ l was a scribal error, because it does not fit the designation of a geographical location. The orthographic and philological reasons mitigate the reading of ysry·r/ l as Jezreel (see also Kitchen 2004).") the majority of Egyptologists concur that the reference should indeed be understood as referring to Israel, and mainstream scholarship acknowledges a connection between the Israel mentioned and biblical Israel.

=== Interpretation ===
The Merneptah stele is considered to be the first extra-biblical reference to ancient Israel in ancient history and is widely considered to be authentic and providing historical information. It’s believed to be mentioning Israel as people not as a nation, with Charles Krauthammer regarding the Stele as the earliest record of an ethnic or religious group of today.

Michael G. Hasel, arguing that prt on the stele meant grain, suggested that "Israel functioned as an agriculturally based or sedentary socioethnic entity in the late 13th century BCE" and this in some degree of contrast to nomadic "Shasu" pastoralists in the region. Others disagree that prt meant grain, and Edward Lipinski wrote that "the 'classical' opposition of nomadic shepherds and settled farmers does not seem to suit the area concerned". Hasel also says that this does not suggest that the Israelites were an urban people at this time, nor does it provide information about the actual social structure of the people group identified as Israel.

As for its location, most scholars believe that Merneptah's Israel must have been in the hill country of central Canaan.

== Karnak reliefs ==
The stele was found in Merneptah's funerary chapel in Thebes, the ancient Egyptian capital on the west bank of the Nile. On the opposite bank is the Temple of Karnak, where a fragmentary copy was found. In the 1970s Frank J. Yurco announced that some reliefs at Karnak which had been thought to depict events in the reign of Ramesses II, Merneptah's father, in fact belonged to Merneptah. The four reliefs show the capture of three cities, one of them labelled as Asqaluni; Yurco suggested that the other two were Gezer and Yanoam. The fourth shows a battle in open hilly country against an enemy shown as Canaanite. Yurco suggested that this scene was to be equated with the Israel of the stele. While the idea that Merneptah's Israelites are to be seen on the walls of the temple has had an influence on many theories regarding the significance of the inscription, not all Egyptologists accept Yurco's ascription of the reliefs to Merneptah.

More recently, Dan'el Kahn has argued that the Israelites are not portrayed in the fourth relief as posited by Yurco, but in three other reliefs (scenes 5, 7, and 8) where they are depicted as Shasu nomads, likely from the southern regions of Canaan, who are taken prisoners and led to Egypt.

== Gallery ==
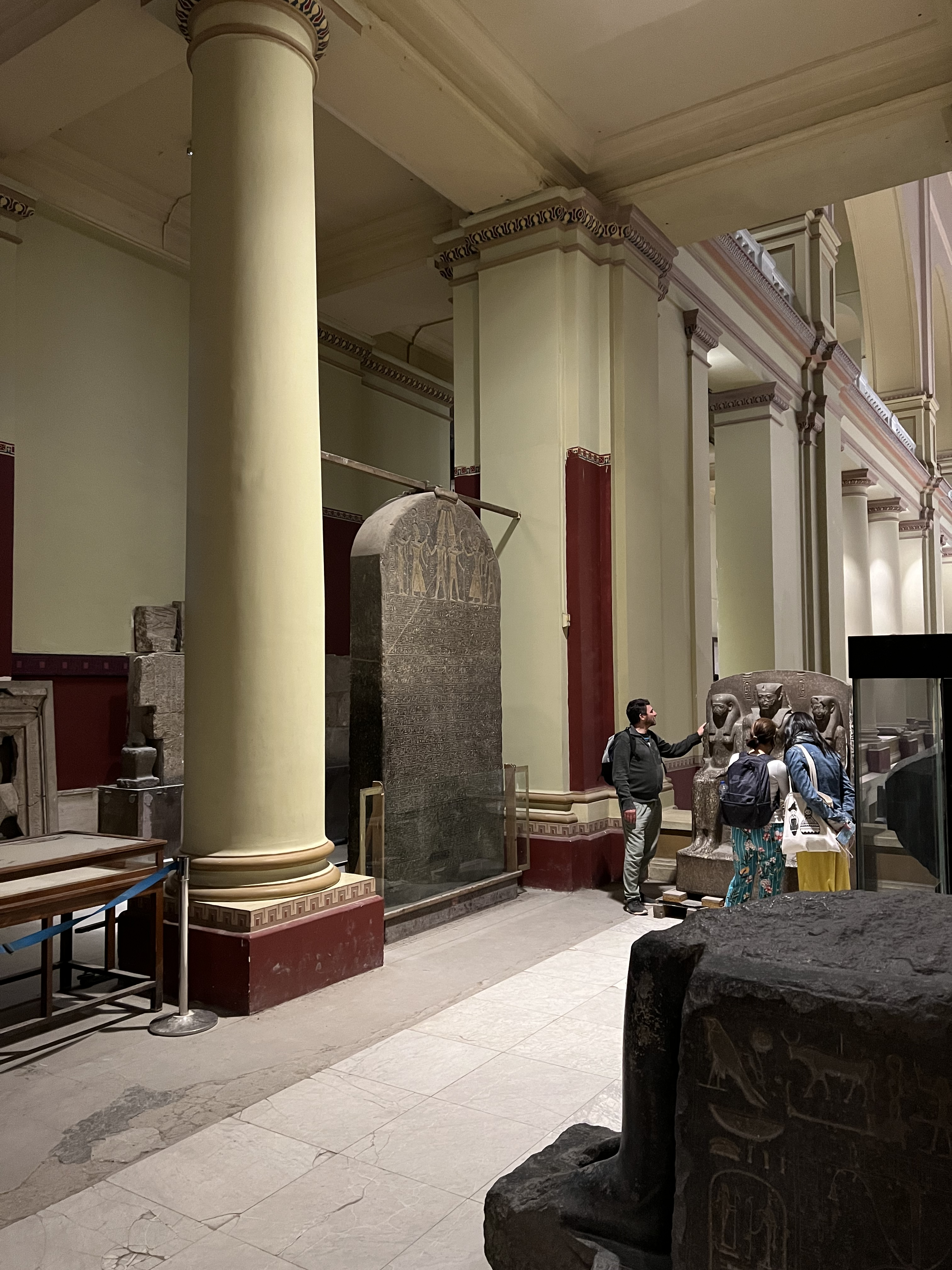
The stele in the Egyptian Museum in 2022, with tourists shown for scale

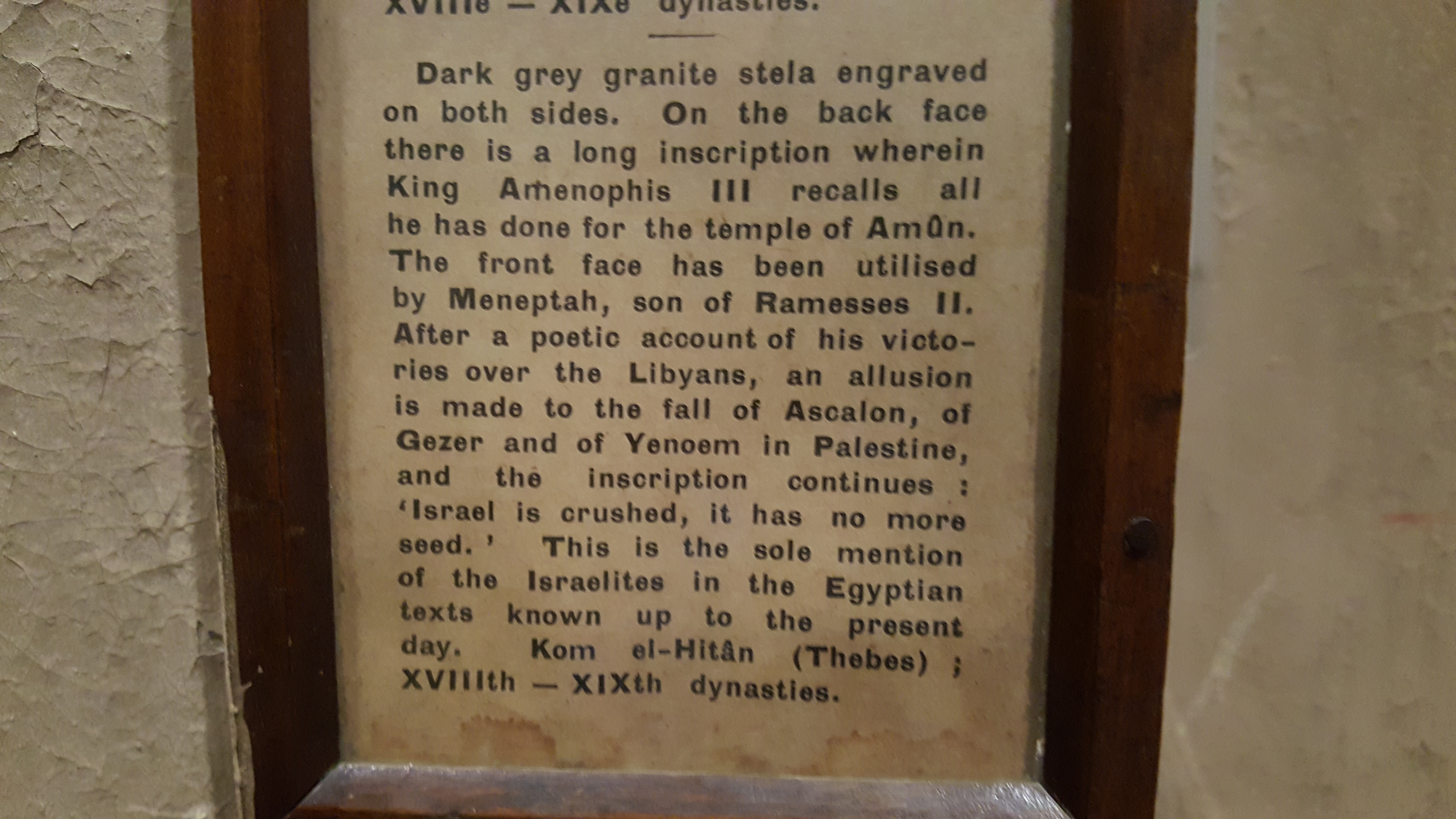
The museum label

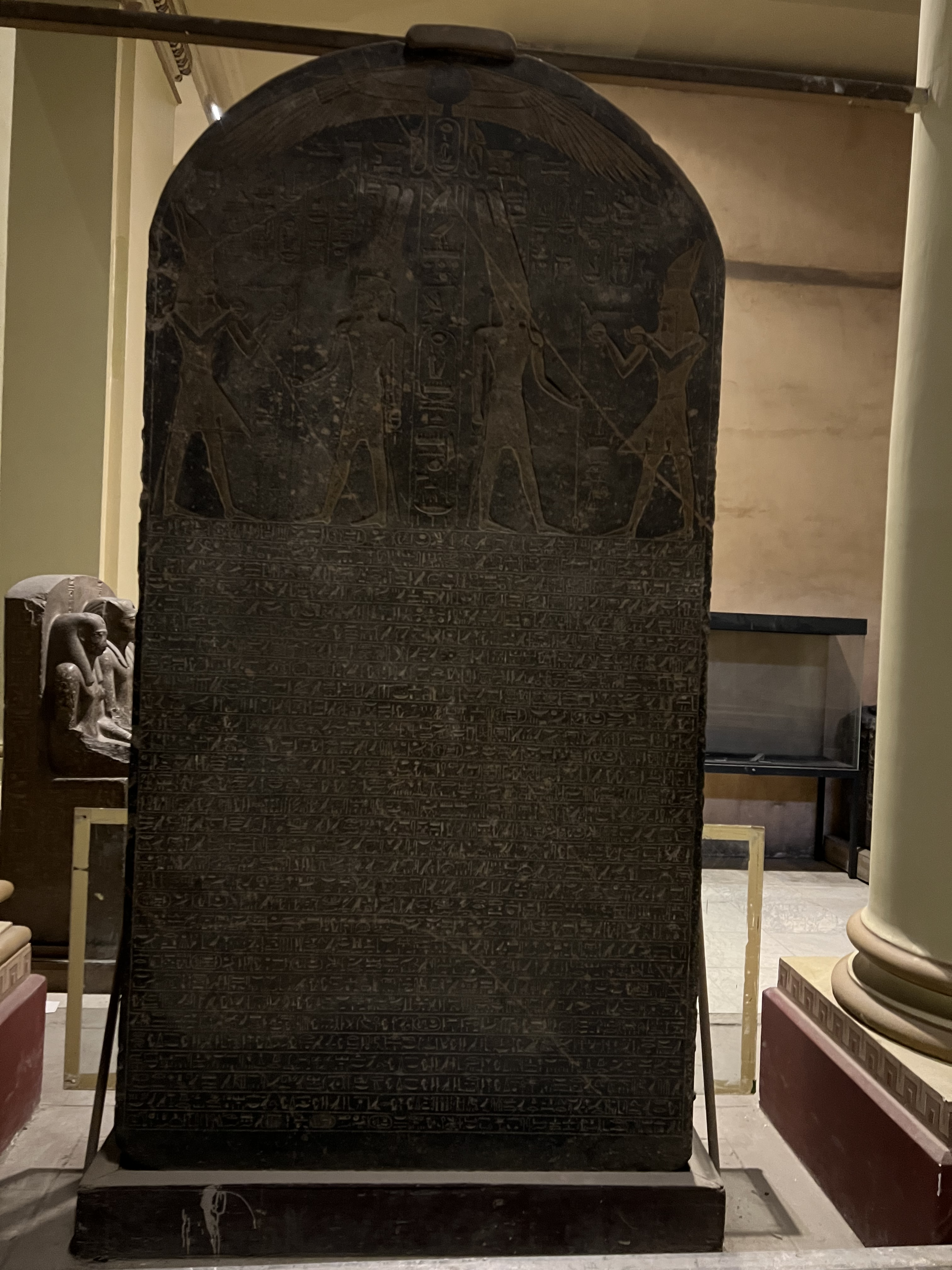
The reverse side of the stele, showing the original inscriptions from Amenhotep III

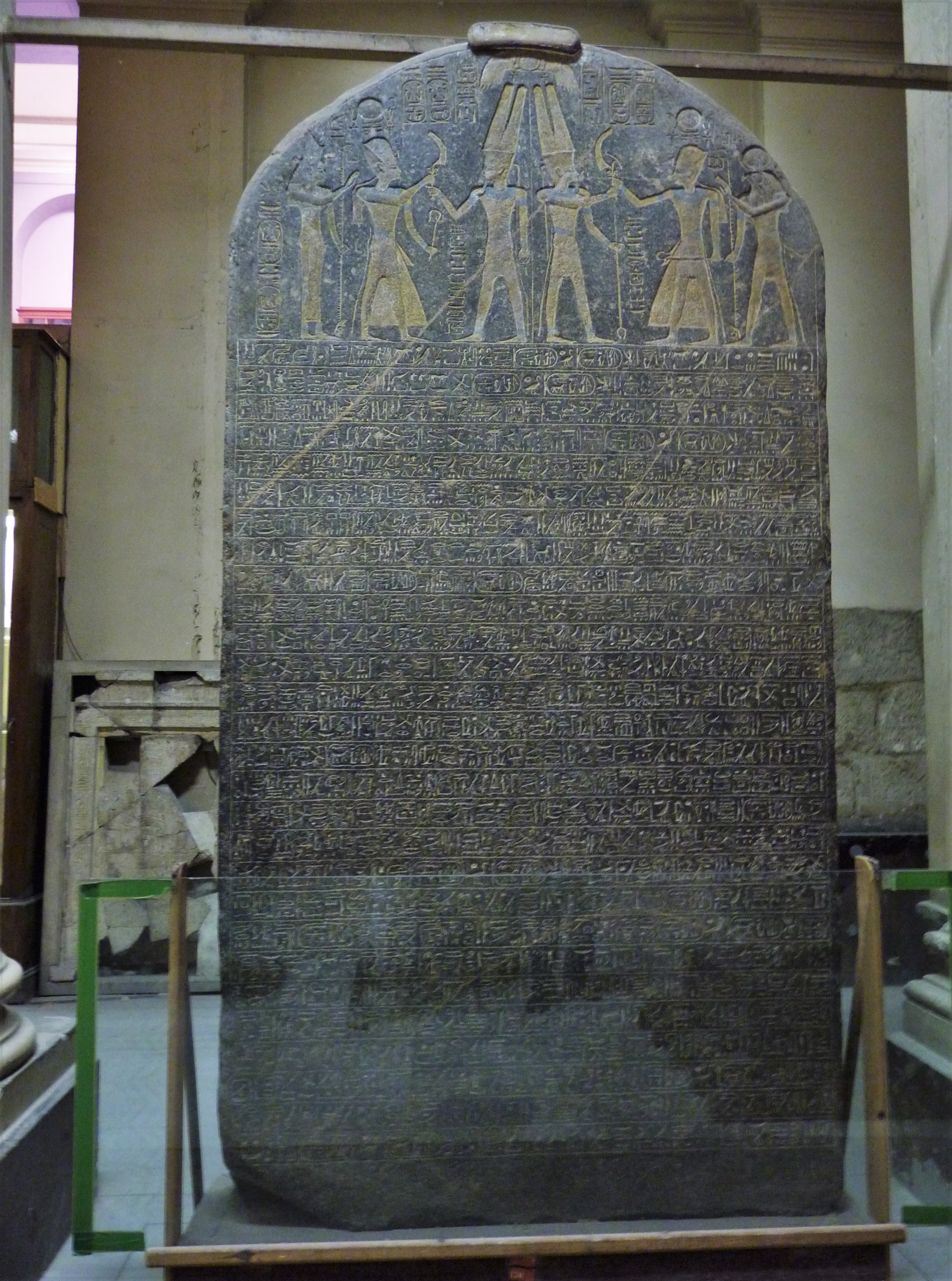
The front side of the stele, which contains Merneptah's inscriptions

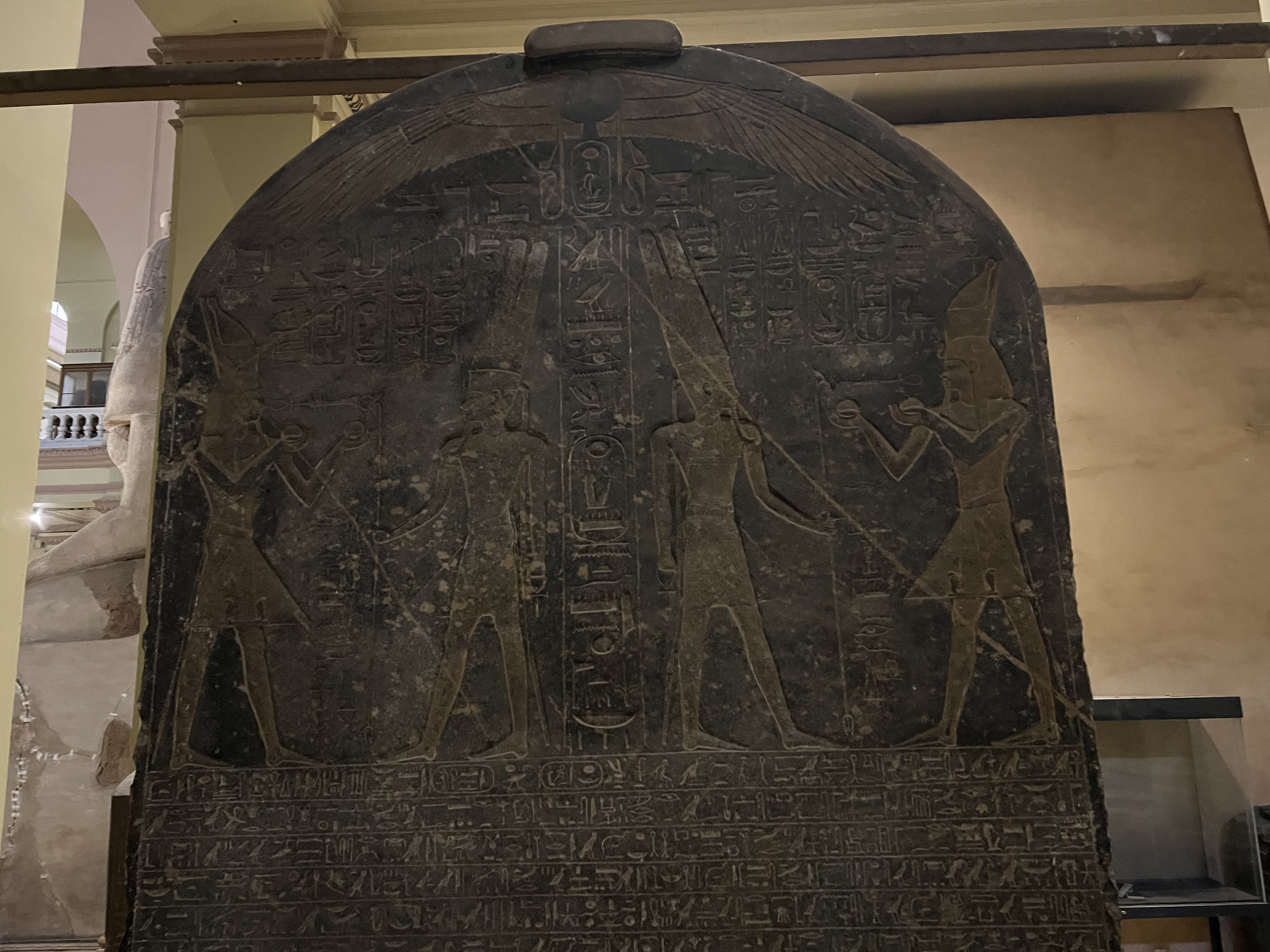
Reverse side, top, close up

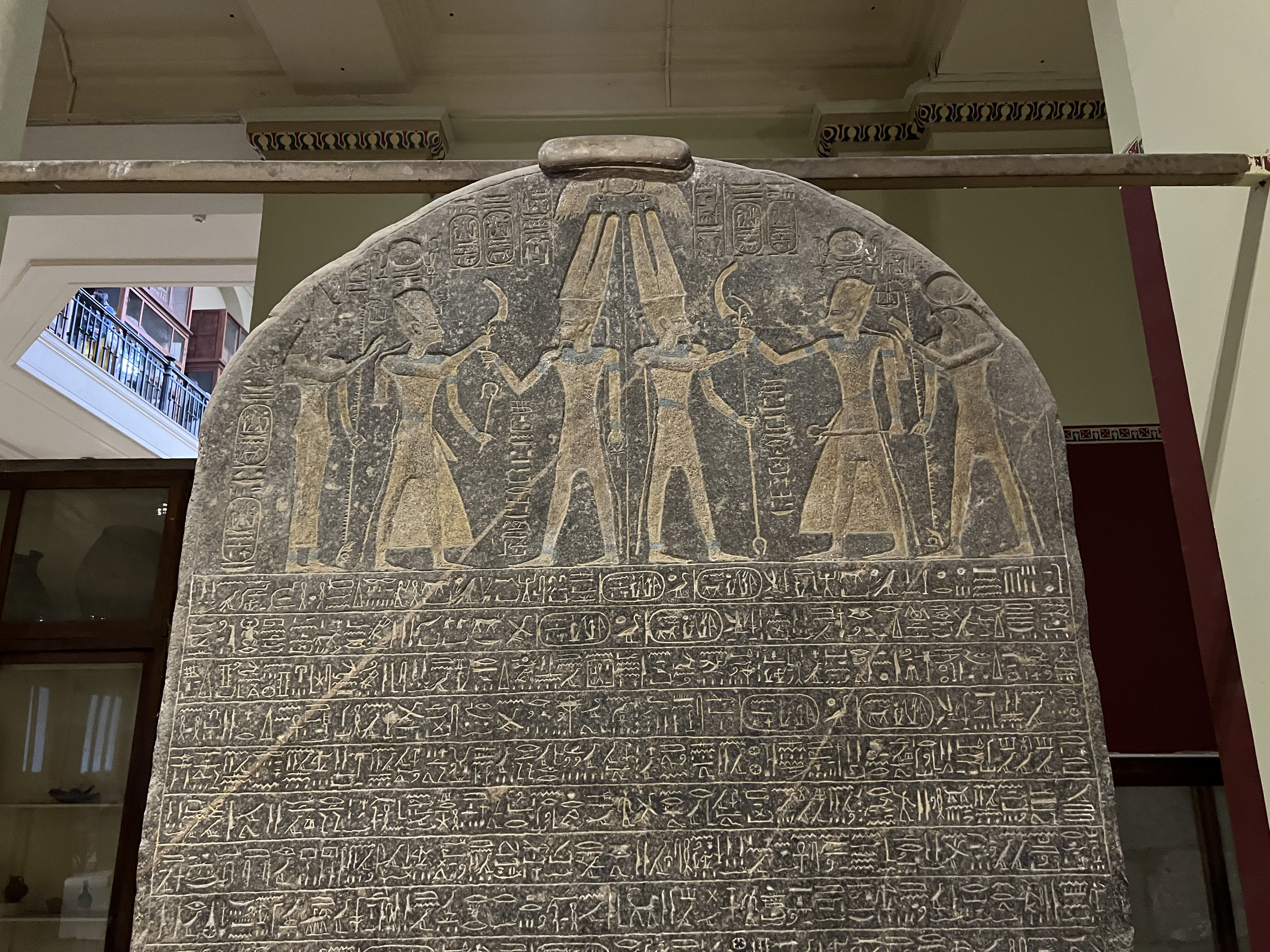
Front side, top, close up

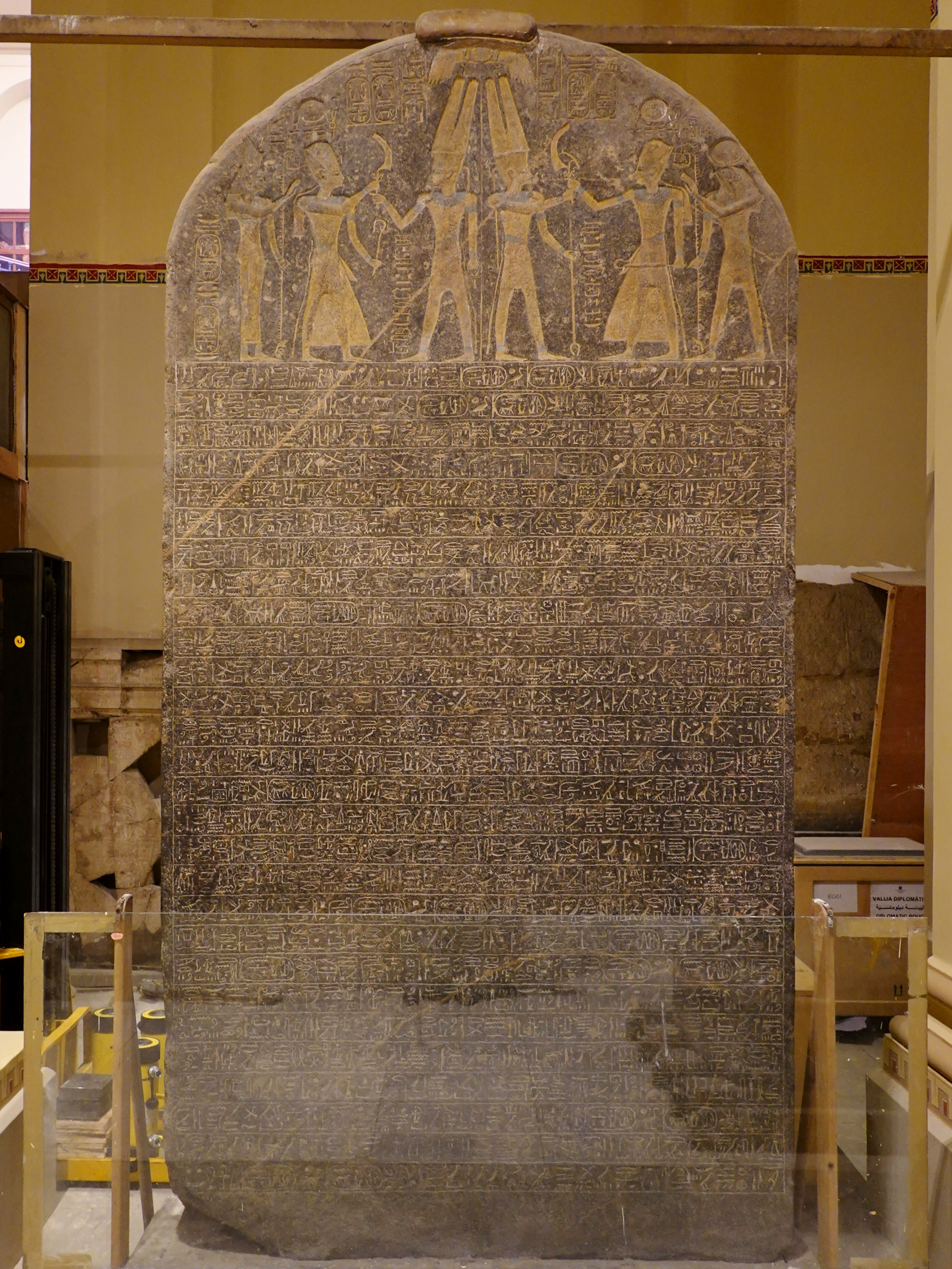
The stele in 2019. The bottom section, containing the reference to ysrỉꜣr, has a protective covering

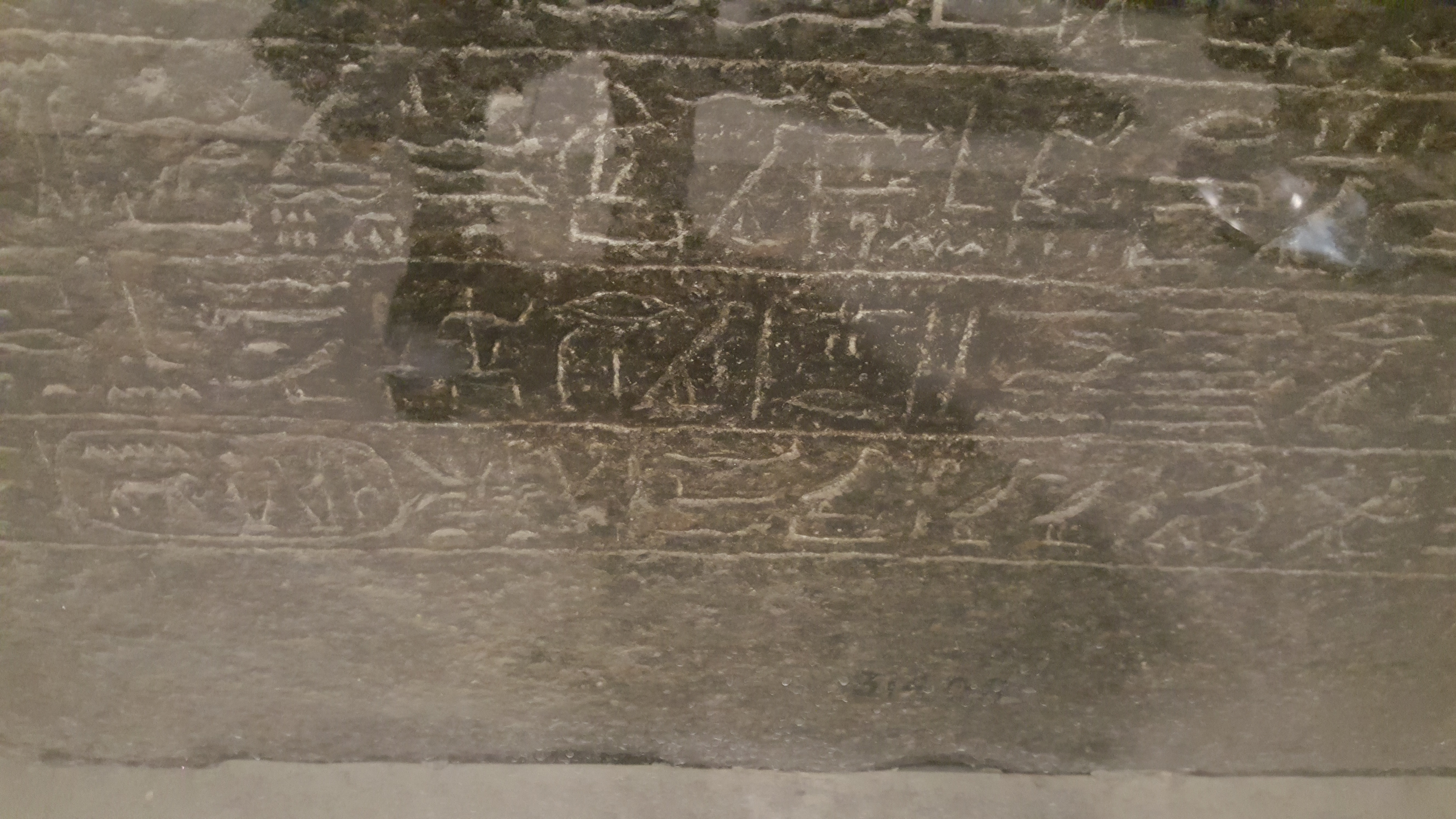
Close up of the reference to ysrỉꜣr

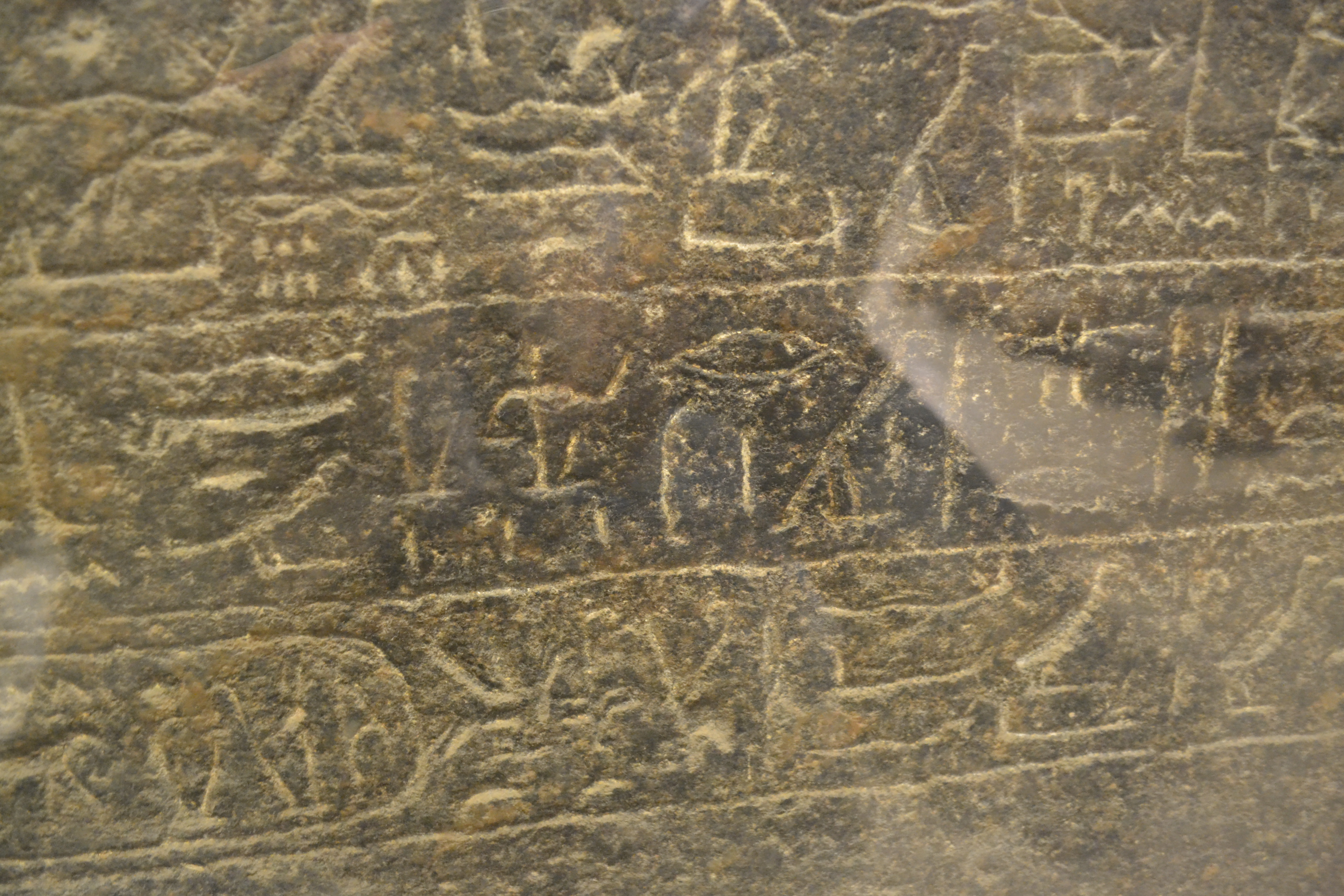
Closeup of the Merenptah Stele, mentioning ysrỉꜣr ("Israel") on Line 27

== See also ==
- Berlin pedestal relief
- List of artifacts significant to the Bible
