= Yenoam =

Place in Ancient Israel or Syria

i i n U19 nw W a G3 M qmA xAst
ynwꜥmꜣ
Yenoam
in hieroglyphs
Era: New Kingdom
(1550–1069 BC)

Yenoam or Yanoam (Ancient Egyptian: ynwꜥmꜣ) is a place in ancient Canaan, or in Syria, known from ancient Egyptian regnal sources from the time of Thutmose III to Ramesses III. One such source is a stela of Seti I found in Beit She'an. Another is the Merneptah Stele.

The location of Yenoam is a matter of speculation. Suggested sites include:

- Tell Shihab in the Yarmouk Valley in southern Syria,
- Tell Na'ama (Na'ameh) in the Hula Valley,
- Tell Na'am (en-Naam) near Yavne'el
- Tell ʿUbeidiya in the Jordan Valley.

It has been tentatively associated with the biblical city of Janohah (Hebrew: ינוח, romanized: ynwḥ).
