= Weippert =

Weippert is a surname. Notable people with the surname include:

- Helga Weippert (1943–2019), German scholar of the Old Testament
- Nadja Weippert (born 1982), German politician
