= Padiiset's Statue =

Ancient Egyptian sculpture

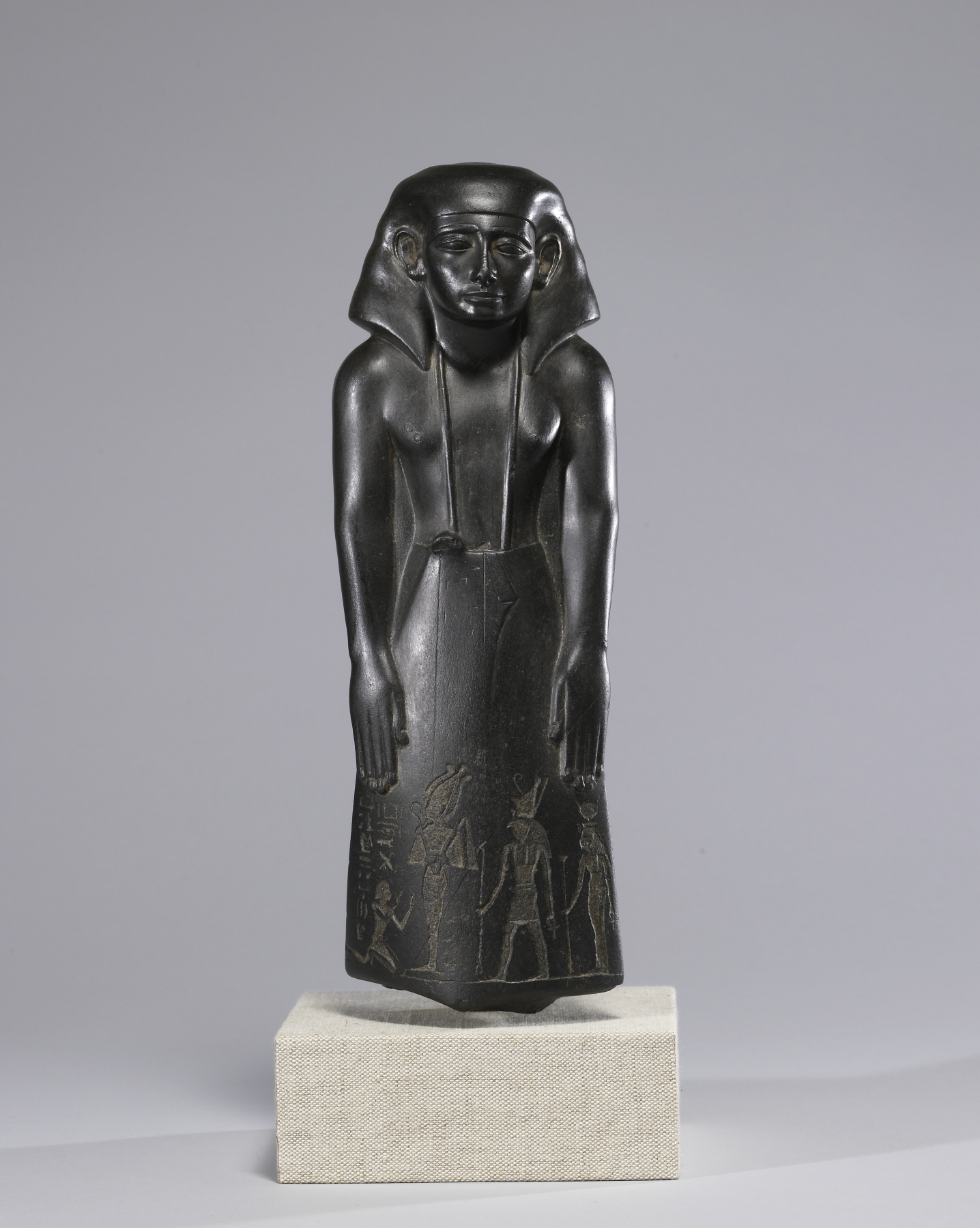
- Padiiset's Statue in the Walters Art Museum, showing the front view
- Material: Basalt
- Writing: Egyptian hieroglyphs
- Created: 1780–1700 BC (Inscription: 900–850 BC)
- Discovered: 1894
- Present location: Walters Art Museum
- Identification: 22203

Padiiset's Statue or Pateese's Statue, also described as the Statue of a vizier usurped by Padiiset, is a basalt statue found in 1894 in an unknown location in the Egyptian delta which includes an inscription dated to the Third Intermediate Period of Egypt referring to Canaan and Philistia (Palestine). The statue was purchased by Henry Walters in 1928, and is now in the Walters Art Museum.

It is the second – and last – known Egyptian reference to Canaan, coming more than 300 years after the preceding known inscription. 'The Canaan' in this inscription, and several others from ancient Egypt, is thought to be referencing the city of Gaza. This inscription also refers to Philistia as a toponym, as opposed to an ethnicon (ie. Philistines or Peleset), as is the case in other older Egyptian inscriptions.

== Statue ==
The statue is made of black basalt and measures 30.5 x 10.25 x 11.5 cm, and was created in the Middle Kingdom period to commemorate a government vizier, the traces of whose name, which has been rubbed out, appears on the front on the skirt of the figure, but is illegible. Scholars believe that a millennium after the making of the statue, the original inscription was erased and replaced with inscriptions on the front and back representing "Pa-di-iset, son of Apy", worshipping the gods Osiris, Horus, and Isis.

=== Inscription and translation ===
Émile Gaston Chassinat, the first scholar to publish the inscription, explained the uncertainty around the word conventionally translated as Peleset / Philistia / Palestine. He explains that an almost identical hieroglyphic word was translated “Persians” in the trilingual Decree of Canopus by the contemporary Greek scribes, but that the context would not fit here:

The identification of the second is less easy to establish and may be open to debate. The Canopus Decree does indeed provide a fairly similar country-name, [hieroglyphs], which the Greek version translates as Πέρσαι, “the Persians”; but historical geography hardly supports this identification. Now, [hieroglyphs] corresponds letter for letter to פלשת (Peleshet, “Philistia”), and, if one removes from [hieroglyphs] the elements added to form an ethnic name, one obtains a form [hieroglyphs], [hieroglyphs], and [hieroglyphs] (by the change of [hieroglyph] into [hieroglyph]), which is evidently identical to [hieroglyphs]. It is therefore certain that, in [hieroglyphs], we have the hitherto unattested name of the region occupied by the Philistines in the south-west of Palestine.

The inscription on the front in one translation this reads:

Ka of Osiris: Pa-di-iset, the justified, son of Apy.
The only renowned one, the impartial envoy of Peleset Canaan, Pa-di-iset, son of Apy.

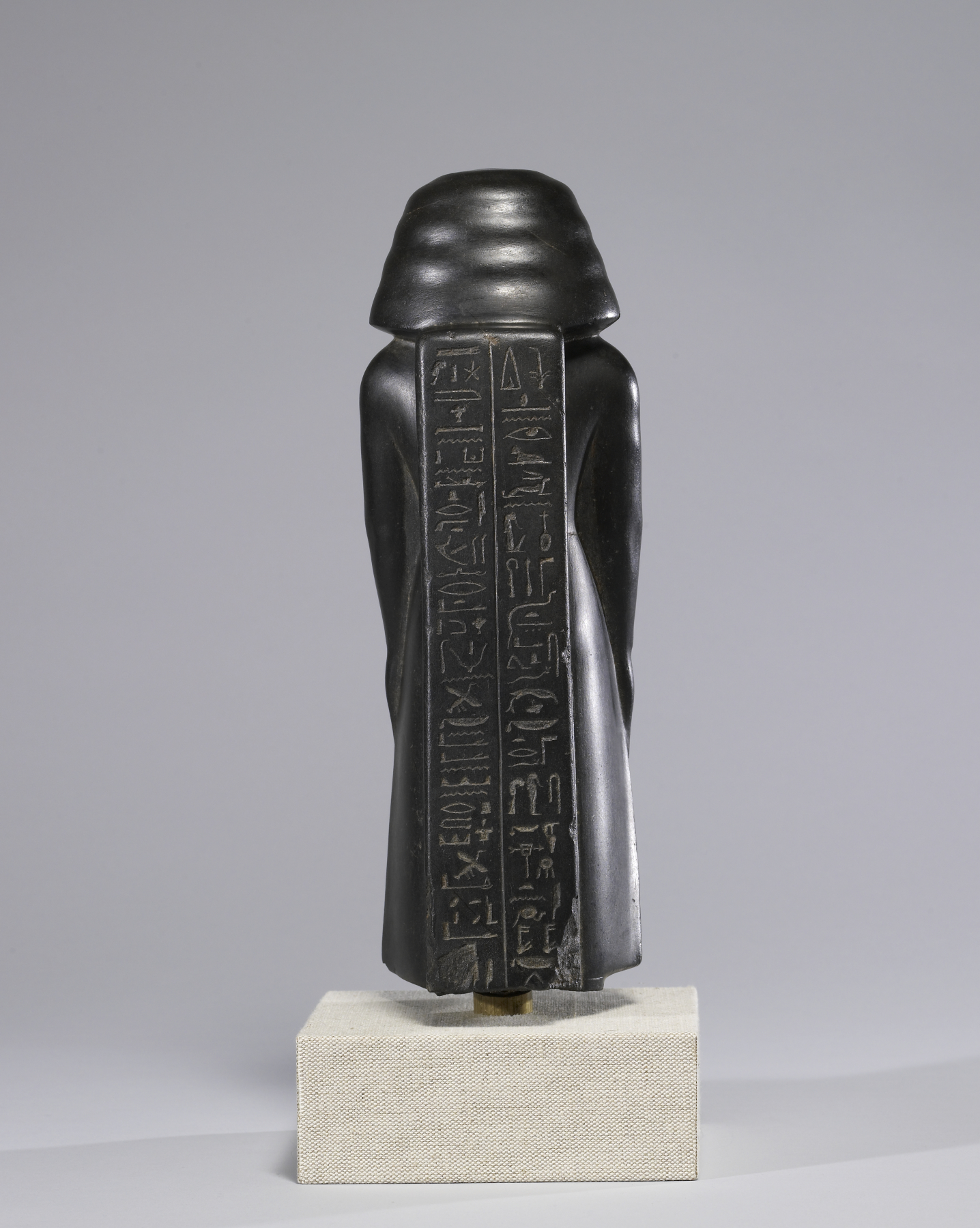
The inscription on the back of the Padiiset statue

The inscription on the back repeats this name, but is longer, providing additional information. One translation of this reads:

An offering that the King gives' to Osiris Onnophris, the Great God, the ruler of Eternity, that he may permit thy corpse to enter (the tomb), that he may cause thy mummy to become divine, that thou mayest become one with the rays of the Sun, that thou mayest approach thy star in the sky - for the ka of the only excellent one, the really exact one (mtr mc), the impartial, the commissioner (or, 'messenger') of Canaan and Palestine, Pedeeset, the son of Apy [the justified].

Whether the text should be translated as Canaan and Peleset, or "the Canaan" of Peleset (or the Philistine or Palestine region of Canaan), or even that "the Canaan" should be read as referring to Gaza, and therefore, "Gaza of Philistia", is a subject of debate between scholars. How prepositions and conjunctions, and whether there are definitive articles used or not, has much bearing on determining the relationships between Padiiset, Canaan (Gaza), and Palestine.

The name 'P3di3st' is Egyptian and means "the one whom Isis gives", while his patronym 'Apy' (or Abi) is Canaanite, indicating he could be of Canaanite or Levantine descent, or an Egyptian who served Egypt from Canaan. If the text is translated as the envoy/messenger of Padiiset of Canaan/Gaza, or to Canaan/Gaza, also impacts evaluation of his origin and the relationship of this territory to Egypt at the time.

== Bibliography ==
- Ash, Paul S. (1999). David, Solomon and Egypt; A Reassessment. Bloomsbury Publishing. ISBN 978-0-567-05578-1.
- Editio princeps: Émile Gaston Chassinat, "Un interprète égyptien pour les pays cananéens". Bulletin de L'Institut Français d'Archéologie Orientale 1, 1901, 98
- Drews, Robert (1998), "Canaanites and Philistines", Journal for the Study of the Old Testament, 23 (81): 39–61, doi:10.1177/030908929802308104, S2CID 144074940
- Lemche, Peter (1991). The Canaanites and Their Land: The Tradition of the Canaanites. Bloomsbury Publishing.
