= Keftiu =

Ancient Egyptian designation for Crete

Keftiu (Middle and Late Egyptian Keft, Keftu, Kaftu, Kafta, Kefdet, Keftju; Old Testament kaphtor; Akkadian kaptaritum; Assyrian kaptara; Ugaritic kptwr, kptr; Mycenaean kapte? (Note: The male name "ka-pte" is documented on Knossian Linear B texts. A connection to the island name is uncertain because the interpretation of the name is still unclear; according to Berit Hildebrandt: Damos and Basileus. Munich 2007, p. 55.)) in ancient Egyptian sources referred to the region of Crete and, among other things, its Minoan-Mycenaean inhabitants and trading ships, which had a range as far as Crete. (Note: The equation of "Keftiu" with Crete is now undisputed in research. The general term "keftiu ships" refers to the possibility of reaching distant Crete. Conversely, this does not automatically mean that "keftiu ships" sailed to Crete or came from there.)

In the 13th century BC, the Egyptians transferred the geographical designation to the Levant. A similar development of localization is noticeable in the writings of the Old Testament. There, kaphtor was originally the Greek homeland of the Philistines. There are also Old Testament texts suggesting that the Philistines were the Sea Peoples who plagued Egypt before the Late Bronze Age collapse. One name often associated with these Sea People, the Tjeker, were a tribe theorized to have originated from Zakros in the far East of Crete. However, in the Septuagint, kaphtor is located in the region of Cappadocia.

== Geographical attestation ==
In Amenhotep III's list of Aegean place names, the villages belonging to Keftiu are mentioned: Kenesch (Knossos), Byschty (Phaistos), Amnesch (Amnissos), Keteny (Kydonia) and Leket (Lyktos).

Texts from Ugarit mention the ancient Egyptian Memphis as the "hereditary land of Crete", together with a geographical description of the location of Crete (kaphtor).

== Ancient Egyptian depictions of the Keftiu ==
The surviving reliefs from the tombs of Theban officials from the New Kingdom date from the reigns of Hatshepsut to Amenhotep II and show the keftiu as gift bearers. The earliest depictions can be seen in the tomb of Senenmut. There, the beardless representatives of the keftiu wear long black hair in a noble appearance. The brownish-reddish skin color corresponds to that of an Egyptian. In the tomb of Amunuser (TT131), the Keftiu, their costume and their gifts are also depicted in an almost culturally accurate manner. In the tomb of Rekhmire, the Cretan envoys were initially depicted with Minoan-Cretan aprons, long open hair and forelocks. Peter Haider dates the vases depicted to the period between 1462 and 1455/50 BC. The subsequent overpaintings, which were carried out by 1436 B.C. at the latest, show the envoys in typical Mycenaean festival style with knee-length aprons decorated with fringes. The subsequent repairs to the wall depictions prove that the ancient Egyptian artists aimed for a detailed depiction. From the same tomb there are inscriptions which have been translated. One such inscription reads:

The coming in peace by Keftiu chiefs and the chiefs of the islands of the sea, humbly, bowing their heads down because of His Majesty's might, the king Menkheperre (Tuthmosis III) Given life forever! When they heard his achievements in every foreign land, their jnw were on their backs, requesting the breath, wanting to be loyal to His Majesty, so that the might of His Majesty will protect them.

There are many other linkages between Keftiu (Kaphtor), the Philistines, and other civilizations of the Bronze Age. Of particular note are the so-called "Keftiu Cup" found at the Temple/Palace at Knossos, and what appear to be Philistine war helmets on the famous Phaistos Disc.
