= Caphtor =

Biblical nation

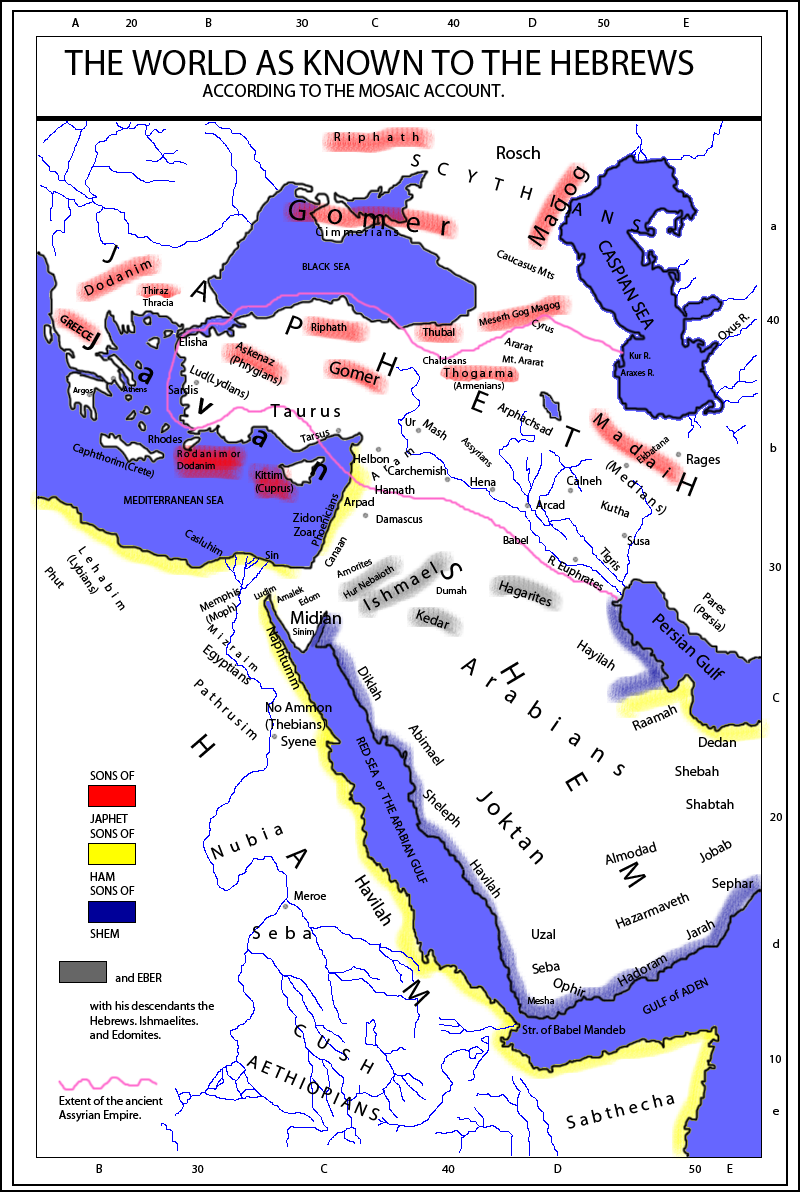
One reconstruction of the Generations of Noah, placing the "Caphthorim" on Ancient Crete

Caphtor (Hebrew: כַּפְתּוֹר Kaftōr) is a locality mentioned in the Bible, in which its people are called Caphtorites or Caphtorim and are named as a division of the ancient Egyptians. Caphtor is also mentioned in ancient inscriptions from Egypt, Mari, and Ugarit.

According to the Bible, Caphtor is the original homeland of the Philistines. They are reported to have eradicated the Avvim prior to settling in Gaza. The Book of Jeremiah suggests that Caphtor is an island ("the isle of Caphtor"), but the term might alternatively refer to a seashore.

Traditionally, Caphtor has been linked to Crete and associated with Egyptian Keftiu or Akkadian Kaptara. Jewish sources placed Caphtor in the region of Pelusium. Contemporary research has challenged the link with Crete, proposing alternative locations such as Cyprus or Cilicia.

== Jewish accounts ==
The Caphtorites are mentioned in the Table of Nations, Book of Genesis (Genesis 10:13–14) as one of several divisions of Mizraim (Egypt). This is reiterated in the Books of Chronicles (1 Chronicles 1:11–12) as well as later histories such as Josephus' Antiquities of the Jews i.vi.2, which placed them explicitly in Egypt and the Sefer haYashar 10 which describes them living by the Nile. A migration of the Philistines from Caphtor is mentioned in the Book of Amos (Amos 9:7).

Josephus, (Jewish Antiquities I, vi) using extra-Biblical accounts, provides context for the migration from Caphtor to Philistia. He records that the Caphtorites were one of the Egyptian peoples whose cities were destroyed during the Ethiopic War.

Tradition regarding the location of Caphtor was preserved in the Aramaic Targums and in the commentary of Maimonides which place it at Caphutkia in the vicinity of Damietta (at the eastern edge of the Nile Delta near classical Pelusium). This view is supported by the tenth century biblical exegete Saadia Gaon, and by Benjamin of Tudela, the twelfth-century Jewish traveller from Navarre, who both wrote that Damietta was Caphtor.

The Midrash Rabbah on Genesis 37:5 (page 298 in the 1961 edition of Maurice Simon's translation) says that the "Caphtorim were dwarfs".

== In archaeological sources ==
=== Mari Tablets ===
A location called Kaptar is mentioned in several texts of the Mari Tablets and is understood to be reference to Caphtor. An inscription dating to c. 1780–1760 BCE mentions a man from Caphtor (a-na Kap-ta-ra-i-im) who received tin from Mari. Another Mari text from the same period mentions a Caphtorite weapon (kakku Kap-ta-ru-ú). Another records a Caphtorite object (ka-ta-pu-um Kap-ta-ru-ú) which had been sent by king Zimrilim of the same period, to king Shariya of Razama. A text in connection with Hammurabi mentions Caphtorite (k[a-a]p-ta-ri-tum) fabric that was sent to Mesopotamia via Mari. An inventory thought to be from the same era as the previous texts mentions a Caphtorite vessel (GAL kap-ta-ri-tum) (probably a large jug or jar).

=== Ras Shamra Texts ===
An Akkadian text from the archives of Ugarit (modern Ras Shamra, Syria) contains a possible reference to Caphtor: it mentions a ship that is exempt from duty when arriving from a place whose name is written with the Akkadian cuneiform signs KUR.DUGUD.RI. KUR is a determinative indicating a country, while one possible reading of the sign DUGUD is kabtu, whence the name of the place would be Kabturi, which resembles Caphtor.

Within Ugaritic inscriptions from the Amarna period, k-p-t-r is mentioned and understood to be Caphtor: A poem uses k-p-t-r as a parallel for Egypt (H-k-p-t) naming it as the home of the god Kothar-wa-Khasis the Ugaritic equivalent of the Egyptian god Ptah. Prior to the discovery of the reference to H-k-p-t scholars had already considered the possibility of iy Caphtor found in Jeremiah being the Semitic cognate of "Egypt".

=== Egyptian inscriptions ===
The name k-p-t-ȝ-r is found written in hieroglyphics in a list of locations in the Ptolemaic temple of Kom Ombo in Upper Egypt and is regarded as a reference to Caphtor.

The reference to k-p-t-ȝ-r should not be confused with other inscriptions at the temple and from earlier sites mentioning a locality called Keftiu listed amongst lands to the northeast of Egypt and having different spelling and pronunciation, although it has been conjectured by some scholars that this is also a reference to Caphtor. Attempts to identify Caphtor with Keftiu go back to the 19th century and argue that r changed to y in the Egyptian language. However the name k-p-t-ȝ-r more closely resembling "Caphtor" is from the (late) Ptolemaic era and still has the "r" and references to "Keftiu" occur separately at the same site. Those arguing for the identification suggest that k-p-t-ȝ-r is an Egyptian transliteration of the Semitic form of the name and that "Keftiu" is the true Egyptian form. Sayce had however already argued in the 19th century that the names in the text in which k-p-t-ȝ-r occurs were not transliterations of the Semitic forms. Other scholars have disagreed over whether this can be said for the occurrence of k-p-t-ȝ-r.

The equation of Keftiu with Caphtor commonly features in interpretations that equate Caphtor with Crete, Cyprus, or a locality in Anatolia. Jean Vercoutter in the 1950s had argued, based on an inscription of the tomb of Rekhmire that Keftiu could not be set apart from the "islands of the sea" which he identified as a reference to the Aegean Sea. However in 2003, Claude Vandersleyen pointed out that the term wedj wer (literally "great green") which Vercoutter had translated "the sea" actually refers to the vegetation growing on the banks of the Nile and in the Nile Delta, and that the text places Keftiu in the Nile Delta.

This issue is not settled though. In Caphtor / Keftiu: a New Investigation, John Strange argues that the late geographical lists referenced in the preceding paragraph cannot be taken at face value, as they appear to be "random" collections of antique place names, and contain other corruptions and duplicates.

== Translation ==
The targumim translate Caphtor into Aramaic as Kaputkai, Kapudka or similar i.e. Caphutkia explained by Maimonides as being Damietta on the coastland of Egypt.

Referencing Katpatuka, the Septuagint translated the name as "Kappadokias" and the Vulgate similarly renders it as "Cappadocia". The seventeenth-century scholar Samuel Bochart understood this as a reference to Cappadocia in Anatolia but John Gill writes that these translations relate to Caphutkia.

== Modern identifications ==
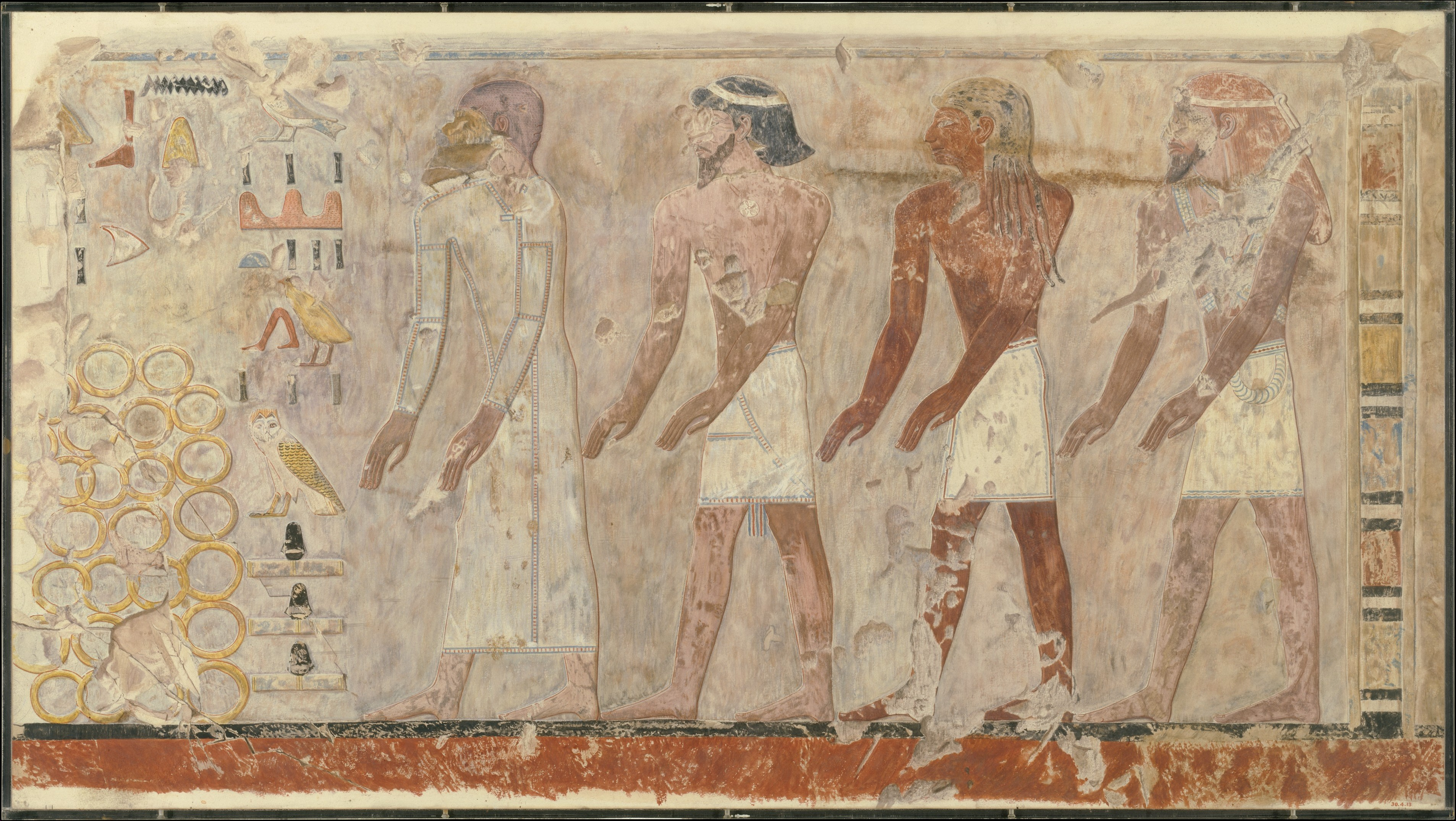
"Four Foreign Chieftains" from TT39 (Metropolitan Museum of Art, MET DT10871). The second from the right is a Keftiu.

From the 18th century onwards commentators attempted several identifications of Caphtor which increasingly disregarded the traditional identification as an Egyptian coastal locality in the vicinity of Pelusium. These included identification with Coptus, Colchis, Cyprus, Cappadocia in Asia Minor, Cilicia, and Crete.

The identification with Coptus is recorded in Osborne's A Universal History From The Earliest Account of Time, where it is remarked that many suppose the name to have originated from Caphtor. While this interpretation agrees with tradition placing Caphtor in Egypt it disregards the tradition that it was a coastland (iy rendered island in some Bible translations) and more precisely Caphutkia; and this contradiction is noted in Osborne. It is now known that the name Coptus is derived from Egyptian Gebtu which is possibly not associated with the name Caphtor.

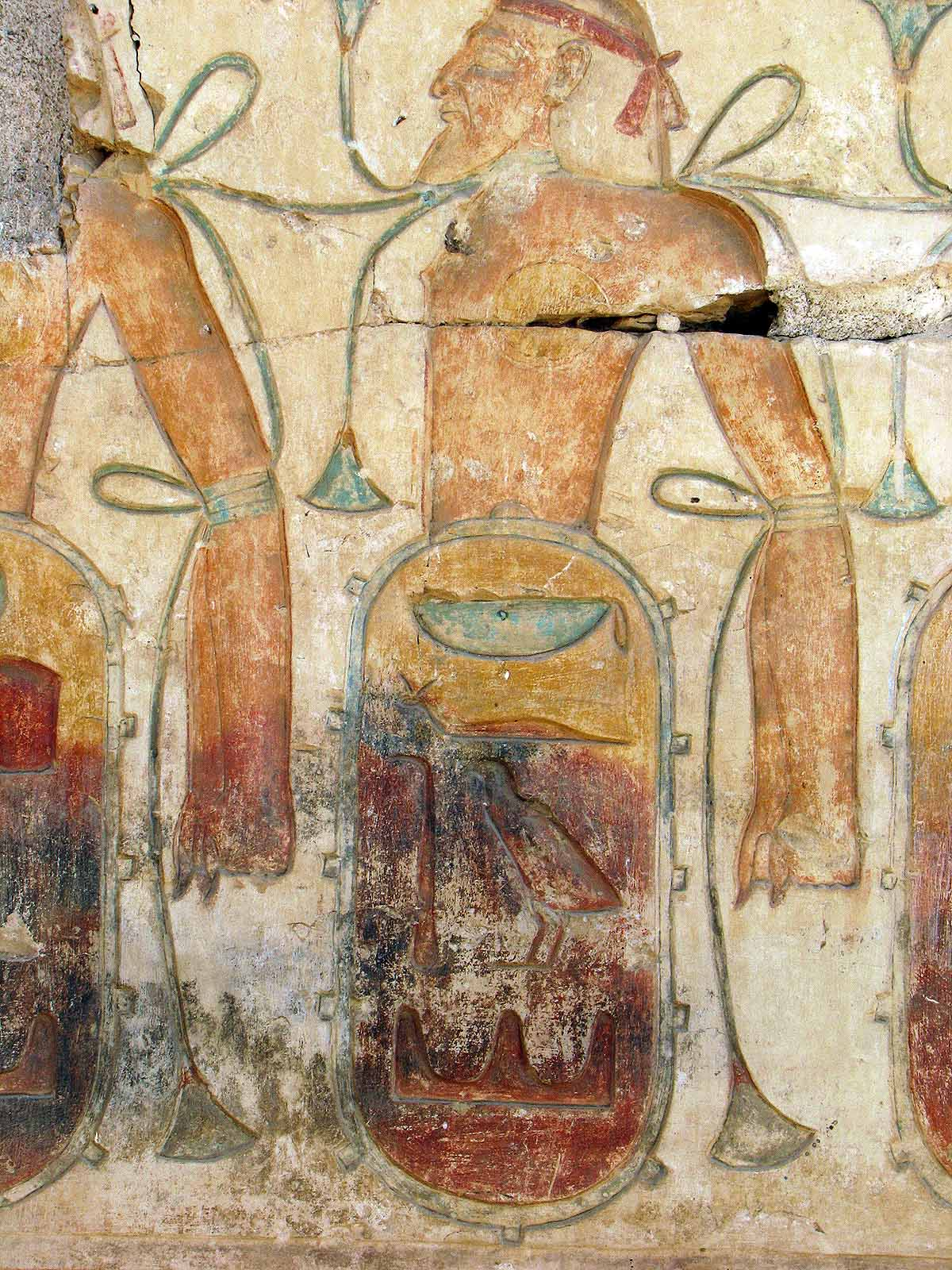
Detail of a generic captive enemy with the hieroglyph for Keftiu under it at Ramses II's temple at Abydos

Egyptian kftı͗w (conventionally vocalized as Keftiu) is attested in numerous inscriptions. The 19th-century belief that Keftiu/Caphtor was to be identified with Cyprus or Syria shifted to an association with Crete under the influence of Sir Arthur Evans. It was criticized in 1931 by G. A. Wainwright, who located Keftiu in Cilicia, on the Mediterranean shore of Asia Minor, and he drew together evidence from a wide variety of sources: in geographical lists and the inscription of Tutmose III's "Hymn of Victory", where the place of Keftiu in lists appeared to exist among recognizable regions in the northeasternmost corner of the Mediterranean, in the text of the "Keftiuan spell" śntkppwymntrkkr, of c. 1200 BCE, in which the Cilician and Syrian deities Tarku (the Hittite sun god), Sandan (the Cilician and Lydian equivalent of Tarku), and Kubaba were claimed, in personal names associated in texts with Keftiu and in Tutmose's "silver shawabty vessel of the work of Keftiu" and vessels of iron, which were received as gifts from Tinay in northern Syria. Wainwright's theory is not widely accepted, as his evidence shows at most a cultural exchange between Keftiu and Anatolia without pinpointing its location on the Mediterranean coast.

In 1980 J. Strange drew together a comprehensive collection of documents that mentioned Caphtor or Keftiu. He writes that crucial texts dissociate Keftiu from "the islands in the middle of the sea", by which Egyptian scribes denoted Crete.

The stone base of a statue during the reign of Amenhotep III includes the name kftı͗w in a list of Mediterranean ship stops prior to several Cretan cities such as Kydonia, Phaistos, and Amnisos, showing that the term clearly refers to the Aegean.

== See also ==
- Avim
