= Avim =

The Avim, Avvim (Hebrew: עַוִּים, Modern: ʿAvvīm, Tiberian: ʿAwwīm) or Avvites of Philistia in the Old Testament were a people dwelling in Hazerim, or "the villages" or "encampments", on the south-west corner of the sea-coast. Their name is first used in Deuteronomy 2:23 in a description of the conquests that had taken place in Canaan before the Israelites arrived. The passage relates that they were conquered by the Caphtorites who usurped their land. They were also theorized to be Rephaim based on the chapter's overall focus on historic wars against the Rephaim.

A trace of them is afterwards found in Deuteronomy 2:23. These verses mention that their land was considered part of the Canaanite land to be conquered by the Israelites:

and the Avvim, that dwelt in villages as far as Gaza, the Caphtorim, that came forth out of Caphtor, destroyed them, and dwelt in their stead.

While the Philistines at the time of the Judges and the monarchy are understood to be predominantly descended from the invading Caphtorites, the Talmud (Chullin 60b) notes that the Avim were part of the Philistine people in the days of Abraham and records that they originated from Teman (land to the south). The Table of Nations in Genesis 10 and 1 Chronicles 1 also mentions Philistines coming from the Casluhim. As part of the earlier Philistines they were subjects of Abimelech who ruled from Gerar. Because of an oath that Abraham had sworn to Abimelech the Israelites were not originally permitted to conquer their land, but after the Caphtorites had usurped them, the oath was no longer valid.

Rabbinic tradition in Genesis Rabba 26:16 views them as one of the early races of giant stature together with the Rephaites and others.

In the context of his New Chronology, David Rohl surmises that after the Inachids were conquered by Caphtor, the Avim, whom he identifies as Aamu, moved to adopt Hathor as patron, setting themselves up in lesser Hyksos Egypt as petty rulers such as Yakbim Sekhaenre, Ya'ammu Nubwoserre, Qareh Khawoserre and Ammu Aahotepre. He suggests Ahhotep II, who drove the Greater Hyksos Caphtorim out of Egypt, was a descendant of this earlier Canaanite group, and became the inspiration behind the legend of Io.
