= Peleset =

Ancient Mediterranean peoples

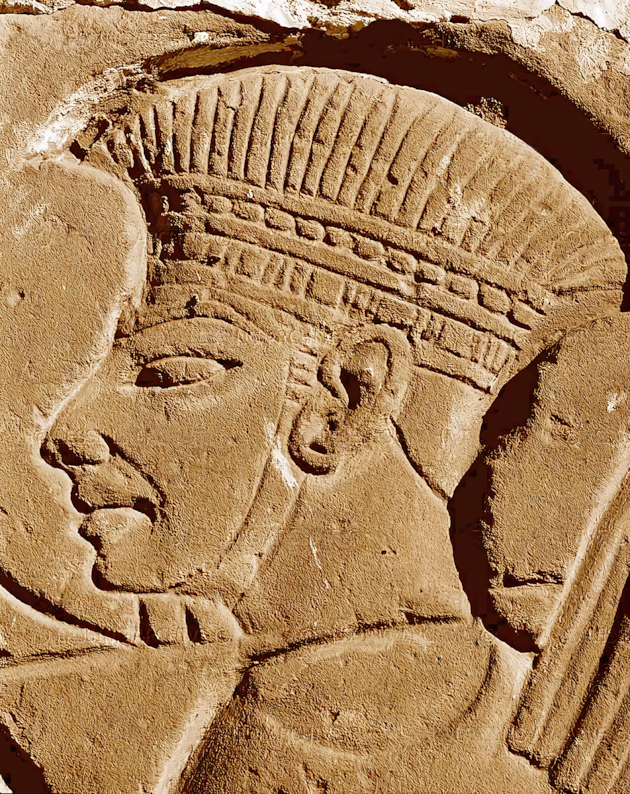
Peleset Warrior from the Medinet Habu temple

The Peleset (Ancient Egyptian: pwrꜣsꜣtj) or Pulasati (in older literature) were a people appearing in fragmentary historical and iconographic records in ancient Egyptian from the Eastern Mediterranean in the late 2nd millennium BCE. They are hypothesised to have been one of the several ethnic groups of which the invading Sea Peoples were said to be composed. Today, historians generally identify the Peleset with the Philistines.

== Records ==
Very few documentary records exist, both for the Peleset and for the other groups hypothesized as Sea Peoples. One group of people recorded as participating in the Battle of the Delta were the Peleset; after this point in time, the "Sea Peoples" as a whole disappear from historical records, the Peleset being no exception. Archaeological evidence supports the existence of a migration of Peleset/Philistines from the Aegean into the southern Levant.

The five known sources are below:

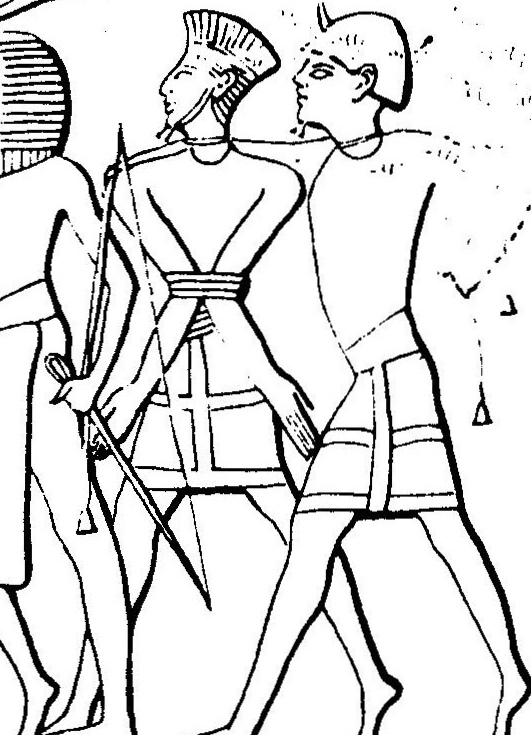
A Peleset and a Sherden prisoner being led by an Egyptian soldier under Ramesses III, Medinet Habu temple

- c. 1150 BCE: Mortuary Temple of Ramesses III: records a people called the P-r-s-t (conventionally Peleset) among those who fought against Egypt in Ramesses III's reign.
- c. 1150 BCE: Papyrus Harris I: "I extended all the boundaries of Egypt; I overthrew those who invaded them from their lands. I slew the Denyen in their isles, the Thekel and the Peleset (Pw-r-s-ty) were made ashes."
- c. 1150 BCE: Rhetorical Stela to Ramesses III, Chapel C, Deir el-Medina.
- c. 1000 BCE: Onomasticon of Amenope: "Sherden, Tjekker, Peleset, Khurma."
- c. 900 BCE: Padiiset's Statue, inscription: "envoy – Canaan – Peleset."

In some translations of the Hebrew bible (Exodus 15:14), the word Palaset is used to describe either the Philistines or Palestina. In the King James bible, it is translated as Palestina.

== Identity and origins ==
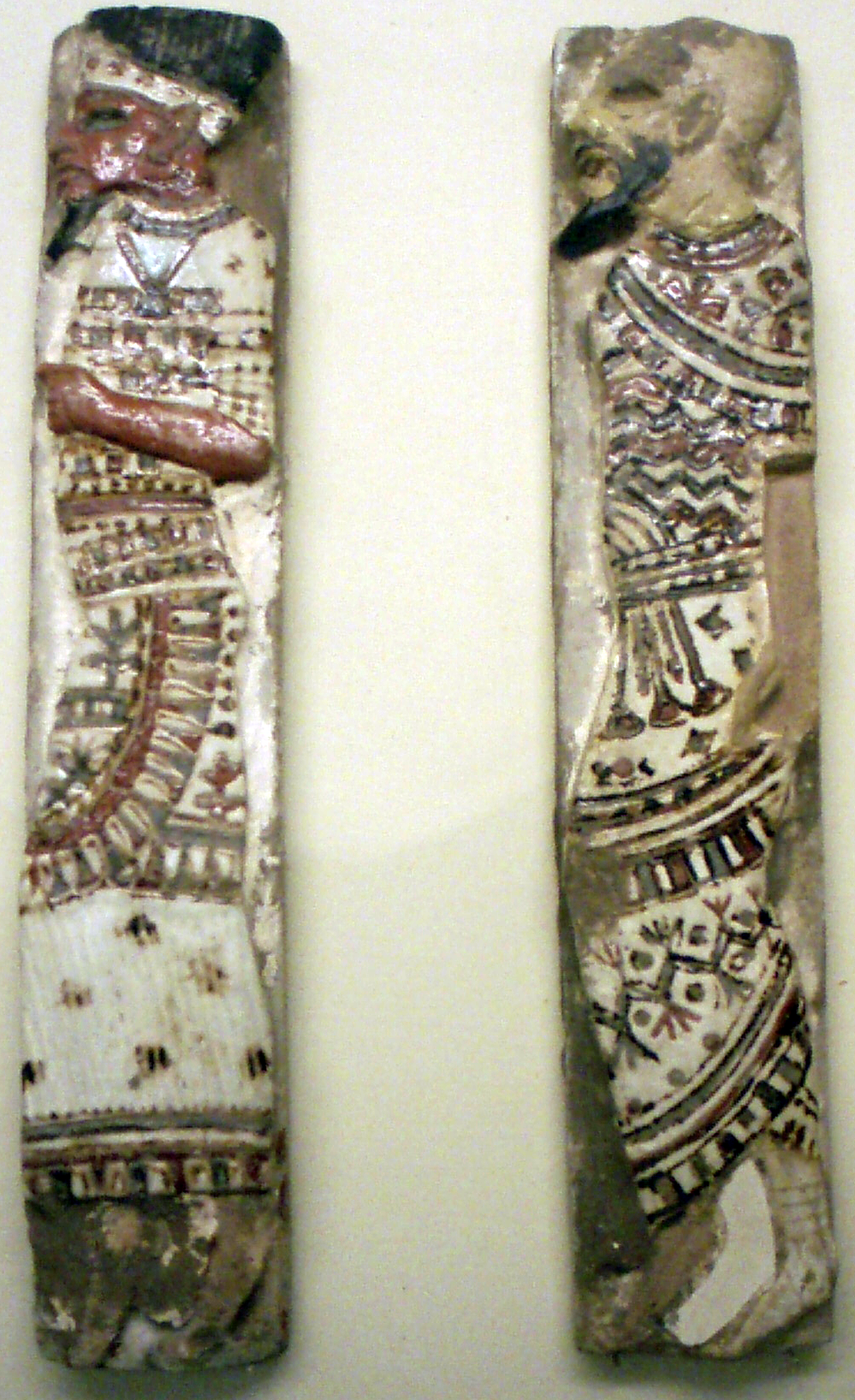
A "prisoner tile" of Ramesses III depicting a Peleset (left) and an Amorite (right)

Today, historians generally identify the Peleset with the Philistines, or rather, vice versa. The origins of the Peleset, like much of the Sea Peoples, are not universally agreed upon – with that said, scholars have generally concluded that the bulk of the clans originated in the greater Southern European area, including western Asia Minor, the Aegean, and the islands of the Mediterranean. Fellow Sea Peoples clans have likewise been identified with various Mediterranean polities, to varying acceptance: the Ekwesh with the Achaeans, the Denyen with the Danaans, the Lukka with the Lycians, the Shekelesh with the Sicels, the Sherden with the Sardinians, etc. They are easily identifiable by their distinctive "feathered" plume helmets, which in reality were most likely leather strips.

Older sources sometimes identify the Peleset with the Pelasgians. However, challenges to this identification were raised in the mid-20th century. A German philologist noted etymological difficulties of the "g" in "Pelasgians" becoming a "t" in the Egyptian translation, especially as the Philistine endonym already corresponded to the form P-L-S-T and therefore required no such modification to be rendered as Peleset in the Egyptian language.

More recent studies find no reason for this variation in phonology to be interpreted as a hardline distinction. It seems more likely that the Peleset, Philistine, and Pelasgian are, respectively, the same word pronounced in ancient Egyptian, Iron Age Hebrew (Note: As in the Books of Judges, Samuel, Kings etc.) and classical Greek. These terms denote the same sort of people known throughout the eastern Mediterranean region. Nothing excludes this hypothesis and there is much to recommend it—particularly the association of all three words with coastal raiders of the same period in the Late Bronze Age collapse.

Historian Jan Dressen has proposed that the name Peleset should be identified as an ethnonym for the inhabitants of the Bronze Age city of Pyla on Cyprus, for which he reconstructs a Linear B reading as *pu-ra-wa-tu/Pyla-wastu. Dressen suggests that the Peleset migration to the Levant could be linked with the occupation and abandonment of Pyla, which occurred around the time span described by the Medinet Habu reliefs.

== Gallery ==
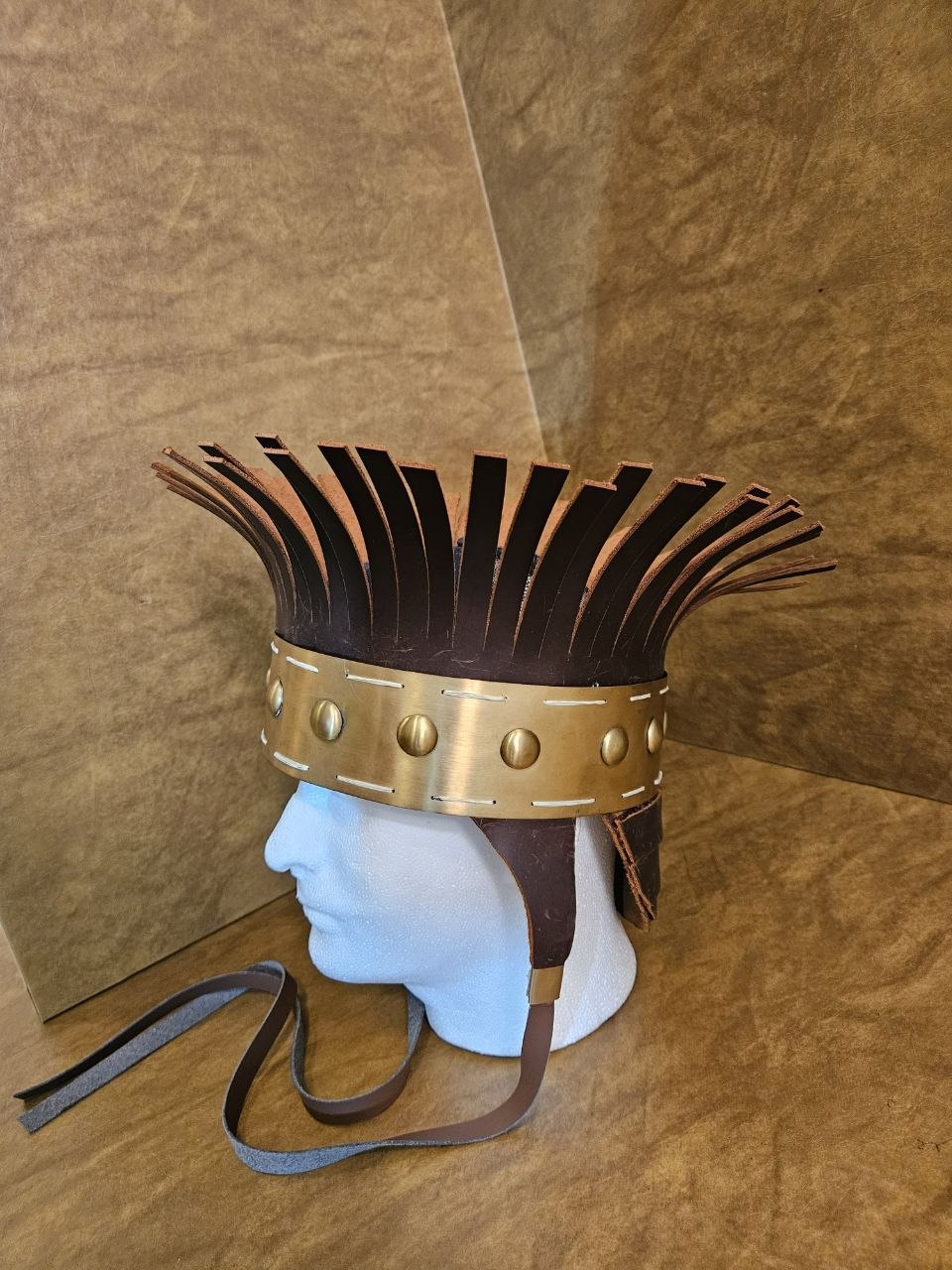
Peleset helmet recreation

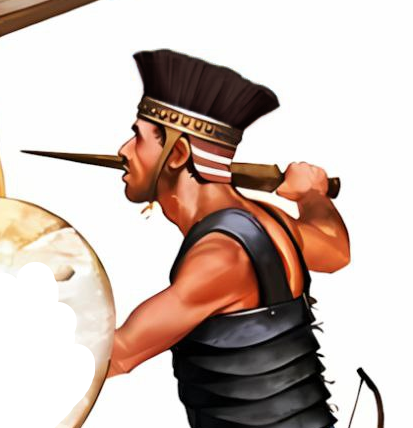
Illustration of Peleset warrior

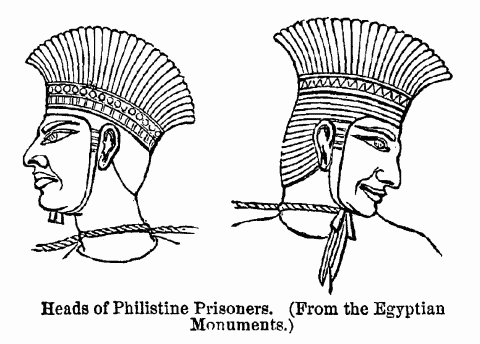
Closeup of iconic "feathered" Peleset helmets

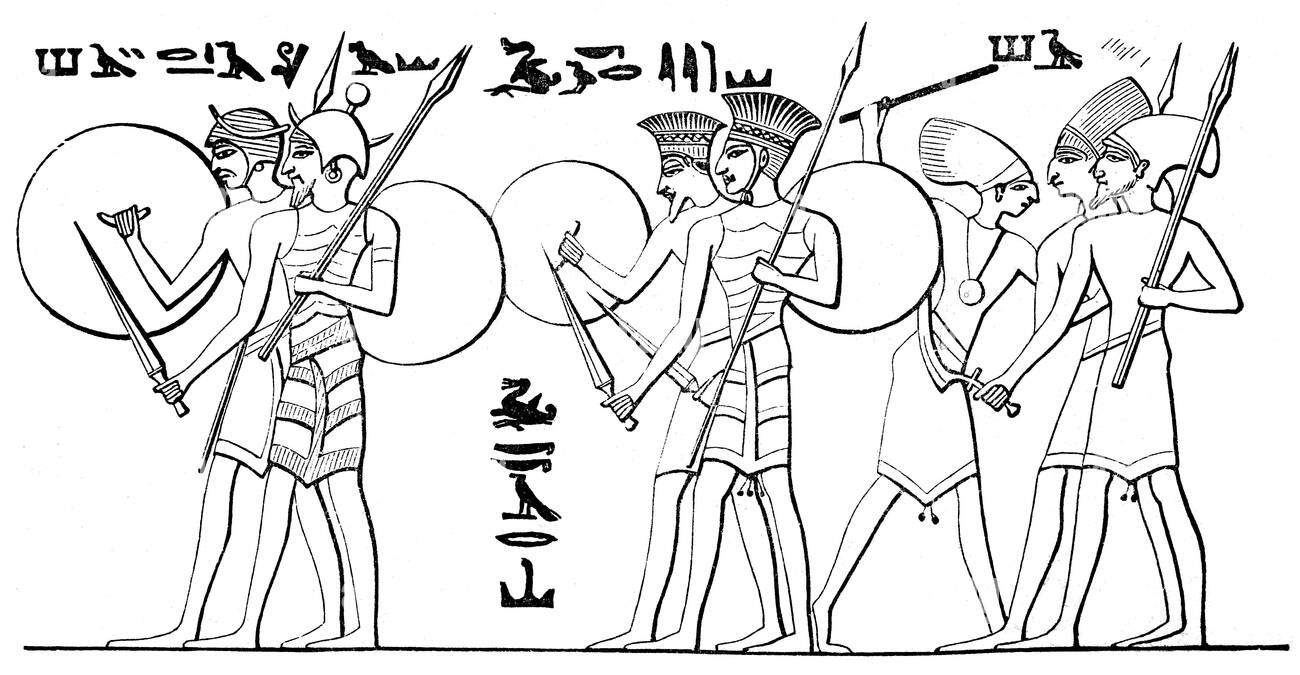
Sherden, Peleset, and Shasu warriors

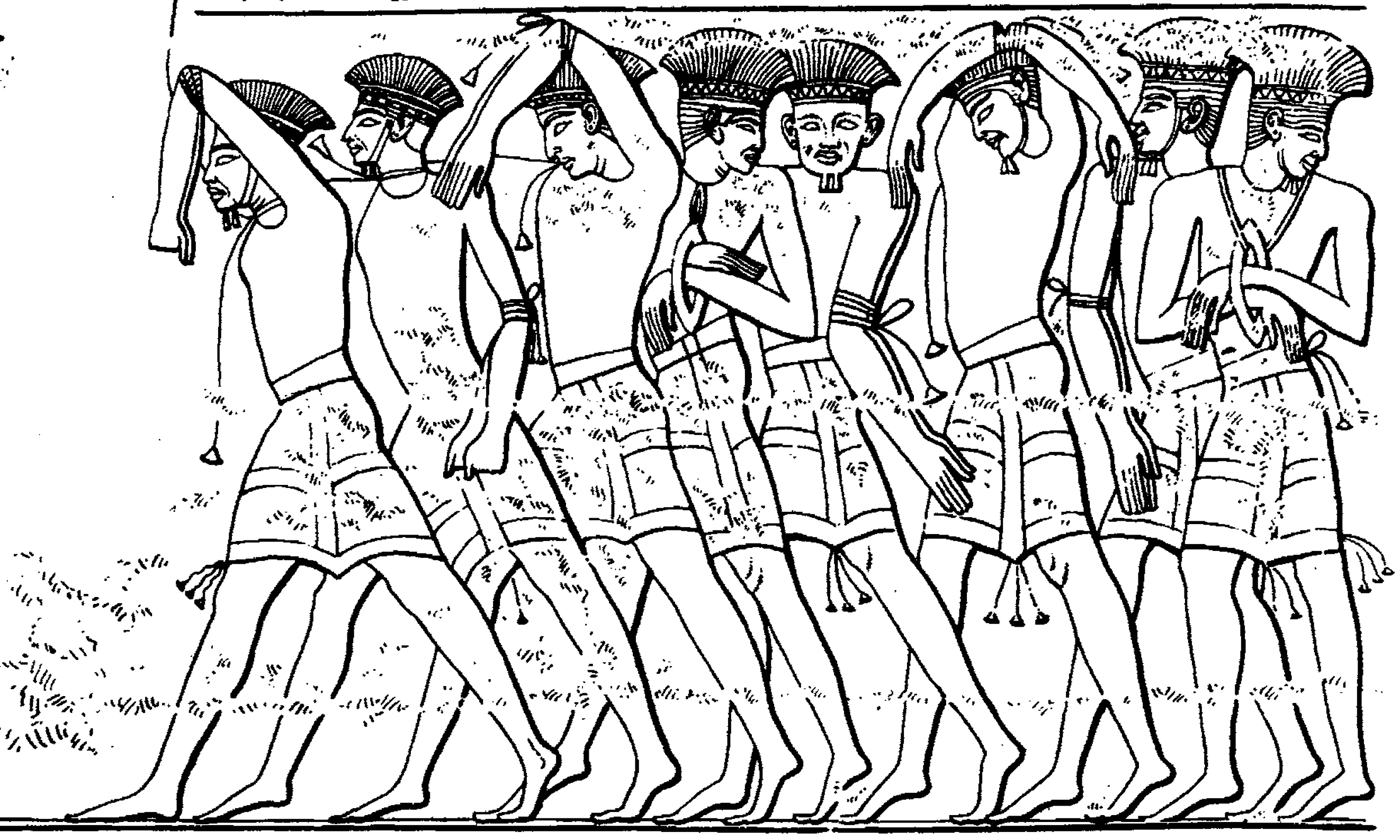
Peleset prisoners

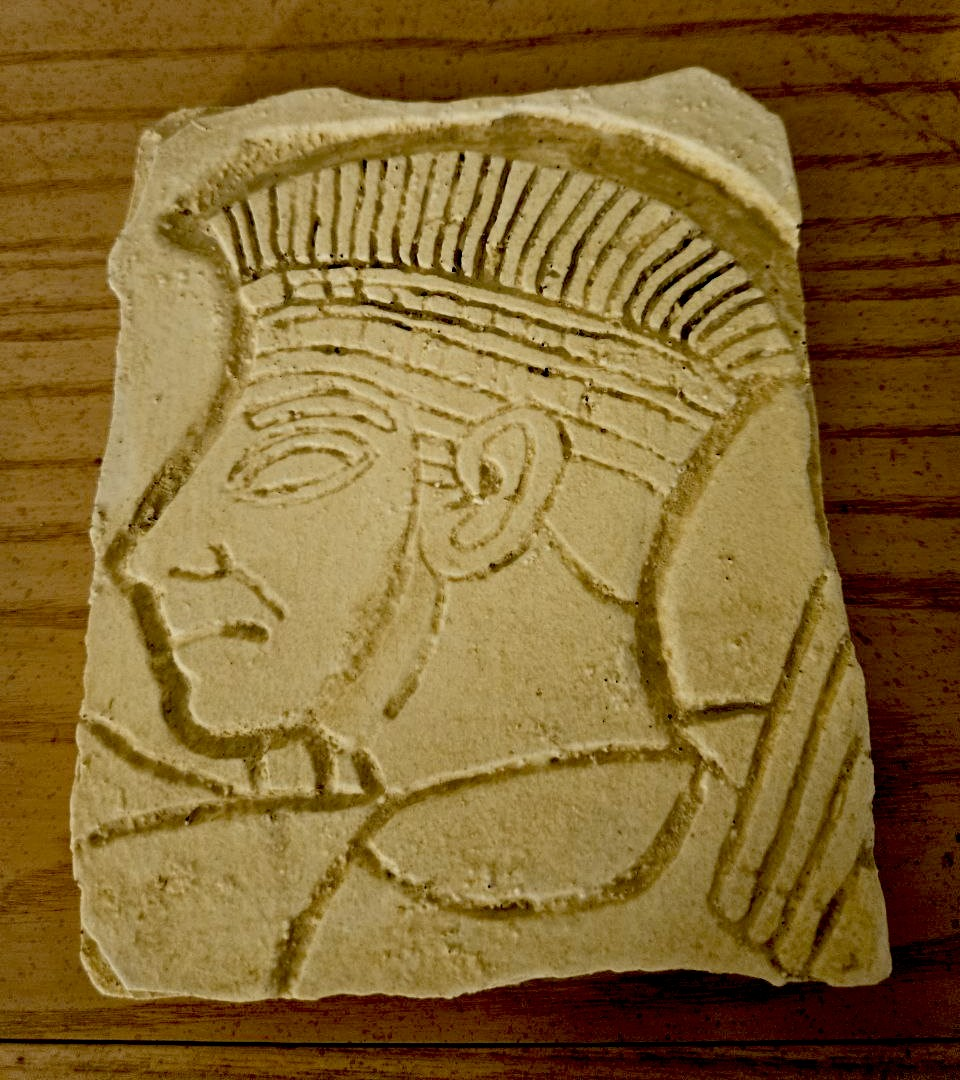
Peleset Warrior inscription replica

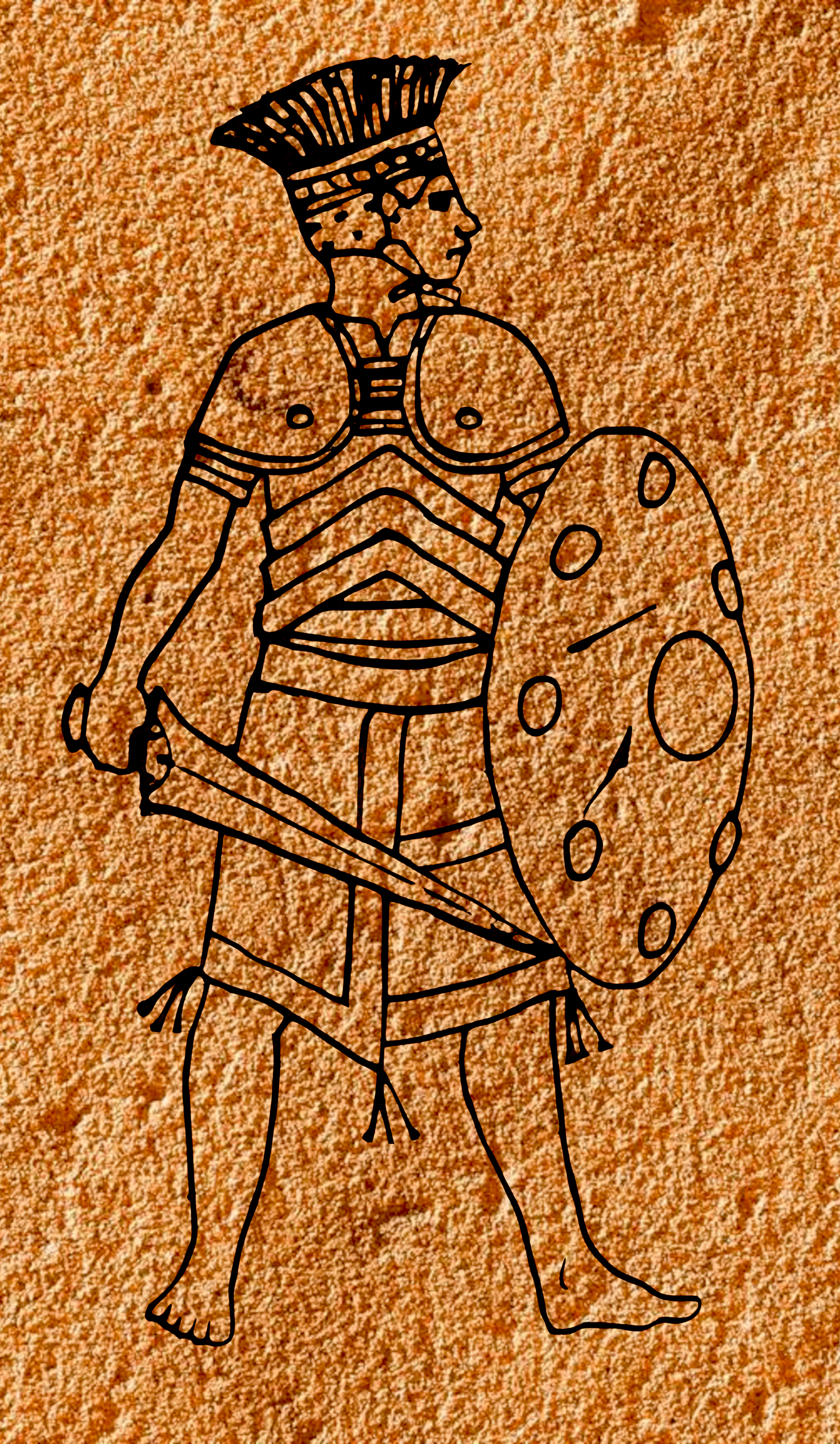
Peleset warrior with gear

== See also ==
- Timeline of the name Palestine

== Bibliography ==
- Killebrew, Ann E. (2005). Biblical Peoples and Ethnicity: An Archaeological Study of Egyptians, Canaanites, Philistines, and Early Israel, 1300-1100 B.C.E. Atlanta, Georgia: Society of Biblical Literature. ISBN 1-58983-097-0.
- Masalha, Nur (15 August 2018). Palestine: A Four Thousand Year History. Zed Books, Limited. ISBN 978-1-78699-273-4.
