= Caphutkia =

Coordinates: 31°25′N 31°49′E

Caphutkia (also Capotakia or Kapotakia; in Aramaic קפוטקיא, קפוטקאי, קפודקאי; later Katpatuka in Old Persian) was the name used in some medieval Jewish and Syriac writings for the town in the vicinity of the former Ptolemaic city of Pelusium and its later Arab counterpart Damietta.

Caphutkia is mentioned in the Targums and the Syriac commentary on Genesis where it is identified with the locality called Caphtor in the Bible. It is mentioned by Maimonides in his commentary where he equates it with Damietta which accords with the identification of Caphtor with Damietta by Saadia Gaon, Benjamin of Tudela and Abraham Zacuto.

In the Talmud (Baba Bathra 58:2) it is recorded that the gates of Caphutkia had the words Anpak, Anbag, Antal inscribed on it - the names of the units of measure according to which people had to buy and sell within the town.
