= Gerald Avery Wainwright =

British archaeologist

Gerald Wainwright
- Born: 4 March 1879; Bristol, England, British Empire
- Died: 28 May 1964 (aged 85)
- Scientific career
- Fields: Egyptology

Gerald Avery Wainwright (4 March 1879 – 28 May 1964) was a British archaeologist and Egyptologist who worked on excavations in Egypt and Sudan.

He was educated from 1889 to 1896 at Clifton College and at the Universities of Bristol and Oxford. He worked with Flinders Petrie, before joining the staff of the Egyptian Antiquities Service.

In 1922, he searched Salakhana's tomb in Asyut, which contained many canine mummies as well as 600 votive steles.

Wainwright studied the sky-religion of ancient Egypt. In 1932, he discovered that the Egyptians used the swan constellation to determine the north.

Named after him, the Wainwright Fund at the University of Oxford provides funding for students and scholars to study Near East archaeology.
