= Helga Weippert =

German Old Testament scholar (1943–2019)

- Born: Helga Klumpp; 4 May 1943; Stuttgart, Germany
- Died: 13 March 2019 (aged 75)
- Education: University of Basel
- Occupation: Theologian
- Known for: Old Testament scholarship
- Spouse: Manfred Weippert

Helga Weippert (4 May 1943 in Stuttgart – 13 March 2019) was a German scholar of the Old Testament.

== Life ==
Helga Klumpp was born and raised in Stuttgart, Germany and attended local schools before pursuing the study of protestant theology and learning Hebrew in Basel, Switzerland. She earned her master's degree in Göttingen and then received her doctorate in 1971 from the University of Basel under the direction of Hans Joachim Stoebe on The Prose Speeches of the Book of Jeremiah.

She married a fellow Old Testament scholar, Manfred Weippert, and moved to Tübingen, Germany, where the young couple lived until 1976.

From 1979 to 1981, she taught Old Testament and Biblical Archeology at the University of Utrecht, and from 1983 at the Ruprecht-Karls-Universität Heidelberg.

From 1992 to 1998, she was Herbert Donner's successor as chair of the German Association for the Exploration of Palestine. For the handbook of archeology, she wrote the volume Palestine in the pre-Hellenistic period. Jens Kamlah called this volume "the most important German manual on biblical archeology."

In 1999, she moved permanently to Villeperdrix, France with her husband. There they lived for more than twenty years and Helga devoted herself to writing fiction and tending to her olive trees. She died in 2019.

== Selected publications ==
- Weippert, Helga. "Die" deuteronomistischen" Beurteilungen der Könige von Israel und Juda und das Problem der Redaktion der Königsbücher." Biblica 53.3 (1972): 301-339.
- Weippert, Helga, and Manfred Weippert. "Jericho in der Eisenzeit." Zeitschrift des Deutschen Palästina-Vereins H. 2 (1976): 105-148.
- Weippert, Helga. "Das Wort vom neuen Bund in Jeremia xxxi 31-34." Vetus Testamentum 29.3 (1979): 336-351.
- Weippert, Helga, and Manfred Weippert. "Die „Bileam”-Inschrift von Tell Dēr'Allā." Zeitschrift des Deutschen Palästina-Vereins (1982): 77-103.
- Weippert, Helga. "Die Ätiologie des Nordreiches und seines Königshauses (1 Reg 11 29-40)." Zeitschrift für die alttestamentliche Wissenschaft 95.3 (1983): 344.
- Weippert, Helga. "Das deuteronomistische Geschichtswerk: sein Ziel und Ende in der neueren Forschung." Theologische Rundschau 50.3 (1985): 213-249.
- Weippert, Helga. Palästina in vorhellenistischer Zeit. Vol. 1. CH Beck, 1988.
- Weippert, Helga. Die Prosareden des Jeremiabuches. Vol. 132. Walter de Gruyter GmbH & Co KG, 2018.
