= Pyramid of Nubkheperre Intef =

- Location within Egypt
- 25°44′13″N 32°37′26″E
- Type: Pyramid
- Periods: Seventeenth Dynasty of Egypt (16th century BC)
- Cultures: Ancient Egypt
- Location: Dra' Abu el-Naga, Egypt
- Part of: Theban Necropolis

History
- Built by: Nubkheperre Intef

Site notes
- Archaeologists: Auguste Mariette (1860); Daniel Polz (2001)
- Discovered: 1860

The pyramid of Nubkheperre Intef is a tomb in ancient Egypt built at Dra' Abu el-Naga, in the Theban Necropolis, opposite the present-day city of Luxor. It is the tomb of the pharaoh of the Seventeenth Dynasty of Egypt, Nubkheperre Intef.

== Description ==
The tomb of Nubkheperre Intef is located in the northern part of the Dra' Abu el-Naga necropolis, in the Theban Necropolis, near tombs TT13 and TT232. It was built during the Seventeenth Dynasty (16th century BC) for pharaoh Nubkheperre Intef. The tomb is a hemispeos consisting of a corridor and a burial chamber cut into the rock, with a pyramid built above it.

Illustration of one of the two lost obelisks of the funerary complex of Nubkheperre Intef.

The pyramid, now heavily damaged, was built at the foot of the rocky cliffs of Dra' Abu el-Naga, in the process covering an earlier burial shaft (K02.2). The pyramid originally measured 10 metres on each side and 11 metres in height, giving it a slope of 66°. It was constructed of mudbrick, with an outer layer 1 to 1.5 metres thick surrounding a core consisting of a heap of pieces of limestone. The pyramid stood at the centre of a roughly square courtyard, approximately 20 metres on each side, which was somewhat irregular because of the constraints of the terrain. The courtyard was enclosed by a mudbrick wall covered with fairly well-preserved white plaster. The relatively unsuitable location chosen by Nubkheperre Intef for his funerary complex, together with the presence of the K02.2 burial shaft beneath the centre of the pyramid, suggests that this shaft was of some importance. The pyramid appears to have been deliberately built over the K02.2 shaft, making it completely inaccessible. This shaft dates to the Thirteenth Dynasty, but its owner is unfortunately unknown, as is any possible relationship between it and Nubkheperre Intef.

At the foot of the pyramid is the entrance to the burial shaft of Nubkheperre Intef (K01.9). A corridor descends to a depth of 7 metres and leads to a burial chamber. The chamber contains a recess cut into the floor to accommodate a coffin.

The funerary complex also included two small obelisks made of sandstone (now lost), one measuring 3.50 metres in height and the other 3.70 metres. The original location of these obelisks is unknown, but the base of one of them was found in front of the pyramid.

== History ==
The entrance to the tomb of Shuroy, directly in front of the pyramid of Nubkheperre Intef.

This tomb was known before its discovery through a mention in the Abbott Papyrus. This document, dating to the Twentieth Dynasty, records that the authorities of the time inspected the tomb, fearing robbery, but found it intact. The Abbott Papyrus was translated in 1859 by Samuel Birch. Fortunately for archeologists, the papyrus reported that the inspected tomb was located near the tomb of Shuroy (TT13), which had already been identified at the time. This information enabled Auguste Mariette to discover the tomb of Nubkheperre Intef the following year.

Nevertheless, the tomb of Nubkheperre Intef had been discovered and looted by local inhabitants several decades earlier, in 1827. It is quite possible that the tomb had in fact escaped looting throughout the period between its inspection during the Twentieth Dynasty and the 1820s. Of the tomb's entire contents, egyptologists were able to recover only the pharaoh's coffin (sold to the British Museum in 1835 by Henry Salt through Giovanni d'Athanasi) and a diadem made of silver (sold to the National Museum of Antiquities in Leiden in 1828 by Giovanni d'Anastasi).

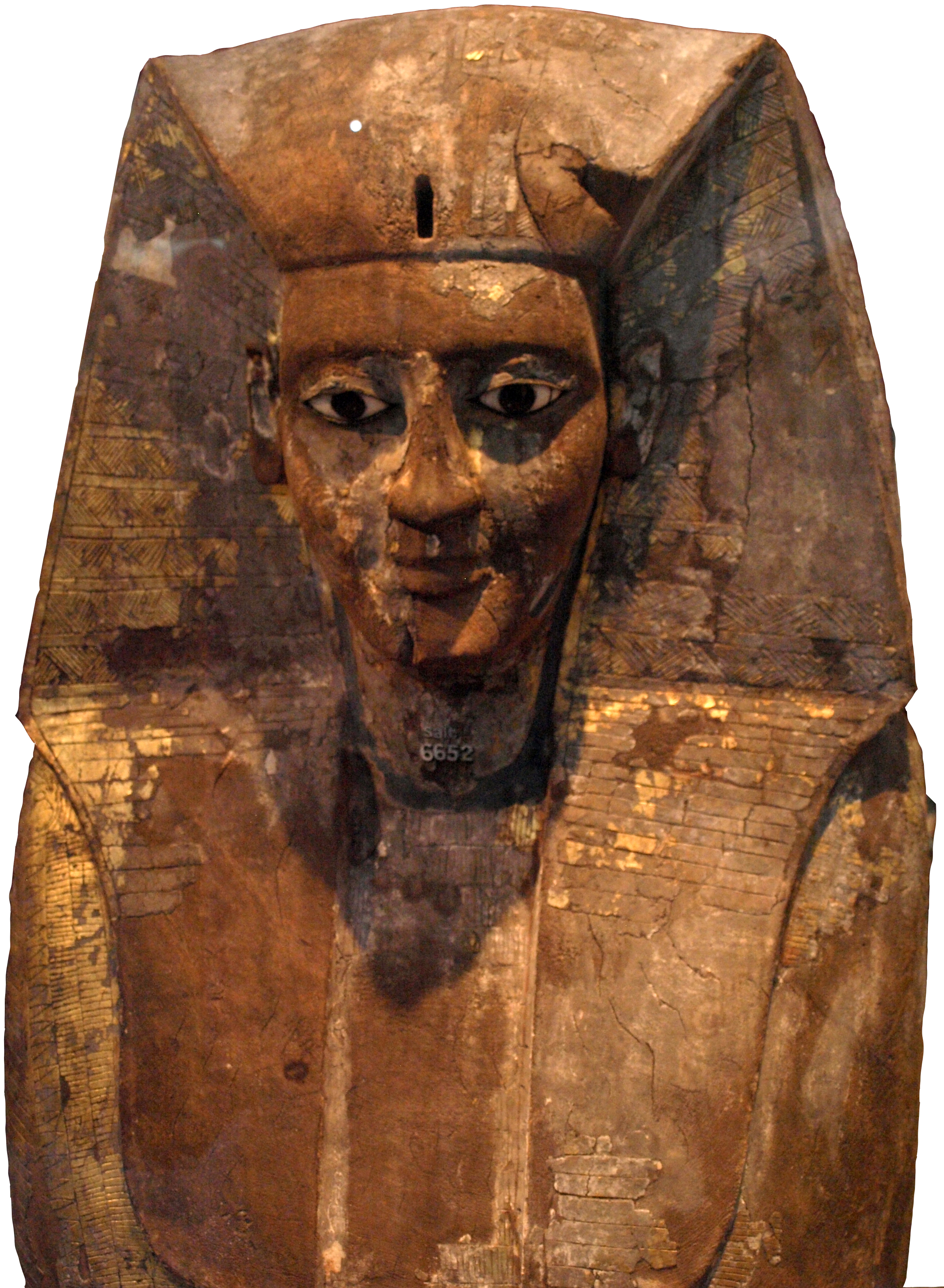
Coffin of Nubkheperre Intef

Diadem of the pharaoh

The obelisks of the tomb of Nubkheperre Intef were cleared by Henry Villiers-Stuart in 1879. Two years later, Gaston Maspero undertook to transport them to the Bulaq Museum in Cairo, but they sank in the Nile on the way, near Gamuleh.

A reconstruction of what the pyramid of Nubkheperre Intef may have originally looked like.

In the following years, the exact location of the tomb of Nubkheperre Intef was lost. Herbert Eustis Winlock, who visited the site during the winter of 1919–1920, identified the tomb of Shuroy but found no trace of the remains of the pyramid. Winlock wrote several years later that the publication of Mariette's work at Dra' Abu el-Naga had been carried out as poorly as the excavations had been conducted brilliantly.

The pyramid of Nubkheperre Intef was finally rediscovered in 2001 by the team of Daniel Polz of the German Archaeological Institute. Like Mariette more than a century earlier, the German archaeologists relied on the Abbott Papyrus and excavated the area around the tomb of Shuroy to find the remains of the lost pyramid. Fragments of the pyramidion of Nubkheperre Intef were found during excavations in 2001.

== Bibliography ==
- Mariette, Auguste (1872). Monuments divers recueillis en Égypte et en Nubie (in French). Paris: F. Vieweg.
- Winlock, Herbert E. (1924). "The Tombs of the Kings of the Seventeenth Dynasty at Thebes". Journal of Egyptian Archaeology. 10 (3/4): 217–277.
- Winlock, Herbert E. (1947). The Rise and Fall of the Middle Kingdom in Thebes. New York: Macmillan Company.
- Porter, Bertha; Moss, Rosalind; Burney, Ethel W. (1964). Topographical Bibliography of Ancient Egyptian Hieroglyphic Text, Reliefs, and Paintings, Vol. I: The Theban Necropolis, Part 2: Royal Tombs & Smaller Cemeteries (PDF) (2 ed.). Oxford: Clarendon Press. ISBN 9780900416101.
- Polz, Daniel (2003). "The pyramid complex of Nubkheperre Intef". Egyptian Archaeology (22): 12–15.
- Polz, Daniel (2005). "The Royal and Private Necropolis of the Seventeenth and Early Eighteenth Dynasties at Dra' Abu el-Naga". In Daoud, Khaled; Bedier, Shafia; Abd El-Fatah, Sawsan (eds.). Studies in honor of Ali Radwan. Cahiers suppléments aux Annales du service des antiquités de l'Égypte. Vol. II. Cairo: Supreme Council of Antiquities. pp. 233–245. ISBN 9773058263.
- Polz, Daniel; Eichner, Ina (2006). "The necropolis of Dra' Abu el-Naga at Thebes: A preliminary report of the 14th season (2004–2005)". Annales du Service des Antiquités de l'Egypte. Vol. 80. Cairo: Publications du Conseil Supreme des Antiquites de l'Egypte. pp. 299–310. ISBN 9774372956.
- Polz, Daniel (2010). "New archaeological data from Dra' Abu el-Naga and their historical implications". In Marée, Marcel (ed.). The Second Intermediate Period (Thirteenth-Seventeenth Dynasties): Current Research, Future Prospects. Orientalia Lovaniensia Analecta. Leuven, Paris & Walpole: Peeters Publishers. pp. 343–353. ISBN 9789042922280.
- Polz, Daniel; Rummel, Ute; Eichner, Ina; Beckh, Thomas (2012). "Topographical archaeology in Dra' Abu el-Naga: Three thousand years of cultural history". Mitteilungen des Deutschen Archäologischen Instituts Kairo. 68: 115–134.
- Polz, Daniel; Rummel, Ute (2017). "The Archaeological Investigations in Dra' Abu el-Naga". In Veldmeijer, André J. (ed.). Sailors, Musicians and Monks: The Leatherwork from Dra‘ Abu el Naga (Luxor, Egypt). Leiden: Sidestone Press. pp. 8–19. ISBN 9789088904158.
- Polz, Daniel; Böhme, Isa; Michels, Susanne; Ruppert, Christine (2018). "Dra' Abu el-Naga, Ägypten. Untersuchungen zu Formation und Entwicklung einer oberägyptischen Residenznekropole. Die Arbeiten der Jahre 2017 und 2018". eForschungsberichte des Deutsches Archäologisches Institut (in German). 2: 13–20.
