= Sobekemsaf I =

Pharaoh of Egypt

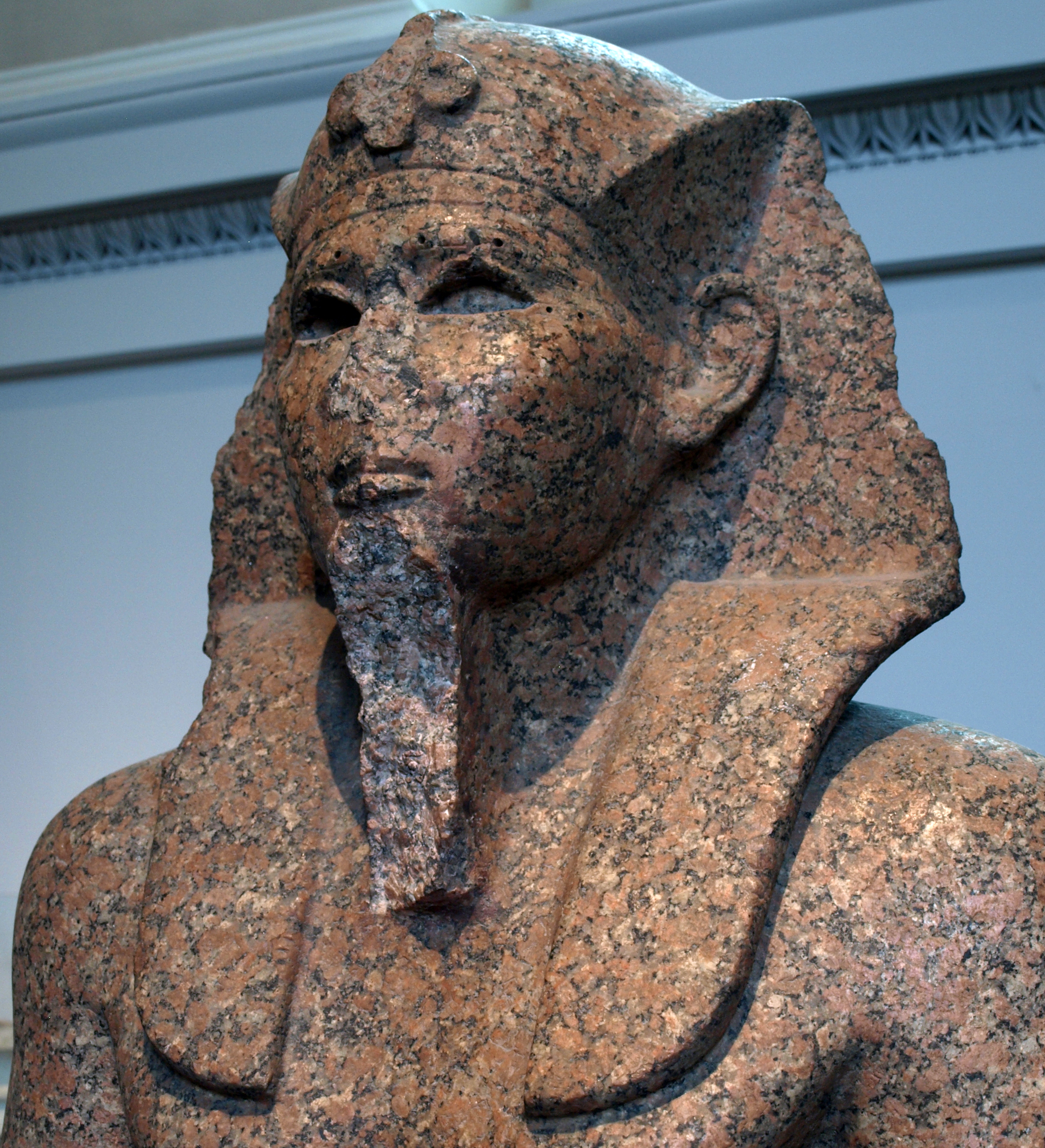
- Granite statue of Sekhemre Wadjkhaw Sobekemsaf I, British Museum

Pharaoh
- Reign: Year 7 (highest att.); c. 16th century BC
- Predecessor: Rahotep most likely or Nebmaatre
- Successor: Sobekemsaf II?
Royal titulary
Horus name
Hotep-netjeru
Htp-nṯrw
The peace of the gods
G5	Htp nTr nTr nTr
Nebty name
Asa-kheperu
ˁš(3)-ḫprw
The two ladies whose apparitions are numerous
G16	a S Y1 Z2 xpr w Z3
Golden Horus
Bik nebu Ineqtawy
bik nbw jnq-t3.w(j)
The golden falcon who embraces the two lands
G8	i n q D32 N19
Prenomen
Sekhemrewadjkhaw
Sḫm-Rˁ-w3ḏ-ḫˁw
Powerful Ra, whose apparitions are flourishing

M23 X1 L2 X1	ra sxm wAD xa a Z2
Nomen
Sobekemsaf
Sbk m s3=f
Sobek is his protection

G39 N5	I4 m V16 Z1 f
- Consort: Nubemhat
- Children: prince Sobekemsaf D (future Sobekemsaf II), Sobekemheb
- Dynasty: 17th Dynasty

Sekhemre Wadjkhaw Sobekemsaf I was a pharaoh of Egypt during the 17th Dynasty in the Second Intermediate Period because both he and Sobekemsaf II were the predecessors of Nubkheperre Intef who was certainly a Theban 17th dynasty king.

== Attestations ==
Sekhemre Wadjkhaw Sobekemsaf I is known from several monuments, see Ryholt 1997:395 File 17:6.

=== Abydos ===
Sobekemsaf I's son, similarly named Sobekemsaf after his father, is attested in Cairo Statue CG 386 from Abydos which depicts this young prince prominently standing between his father's legs in a way suggesting that he was his father's chosen successor.

- Cairo CG 386 | At Abydos, a red granite statue with bas-relief of King's Son Sobekemsaf from the Temple of Osiris.

=== Dendera ===
At Dendera, he is known for a stela mentioning his wife, daughter and son-in-law. Sobekemsaf's chief wife was Queen Nubemhat; she and their daughter (Sobekemheb) are known from a stela of Sobekemheb's husband, a king's son Ameni, son of king's wife Haankhes.

- Petrie Museum 14326 + Moscow I.1.b.32 | At [Dendera], stela of son-in-law Ameny. One fragment bought at Koptos, but the text refers to Dendera.

=== Wadi Hammamat ===
Wadi Hammamat is a road from the Nile River near Koptos to Quseir on the Red Sea coast. Sobekemsaf I is attested by a series of inscriptions mentioning a mining expedition to the rock quarries at Wadi Hammamat in the Eastern Desert during his reign. One of the inscriptions is explicitly dated to his Year 7.

- LD VI 23 (9) | In Wadi Hammamat, a rock inscription with the royal name of Sobekemsaf, an expedition record owned by King's Acquaintance Ini-Sobek. It also mentions other family members and officials.
- In situ | 2x offering scenes, 2x titulary (one dated to Year 7)

=== Medamud ===
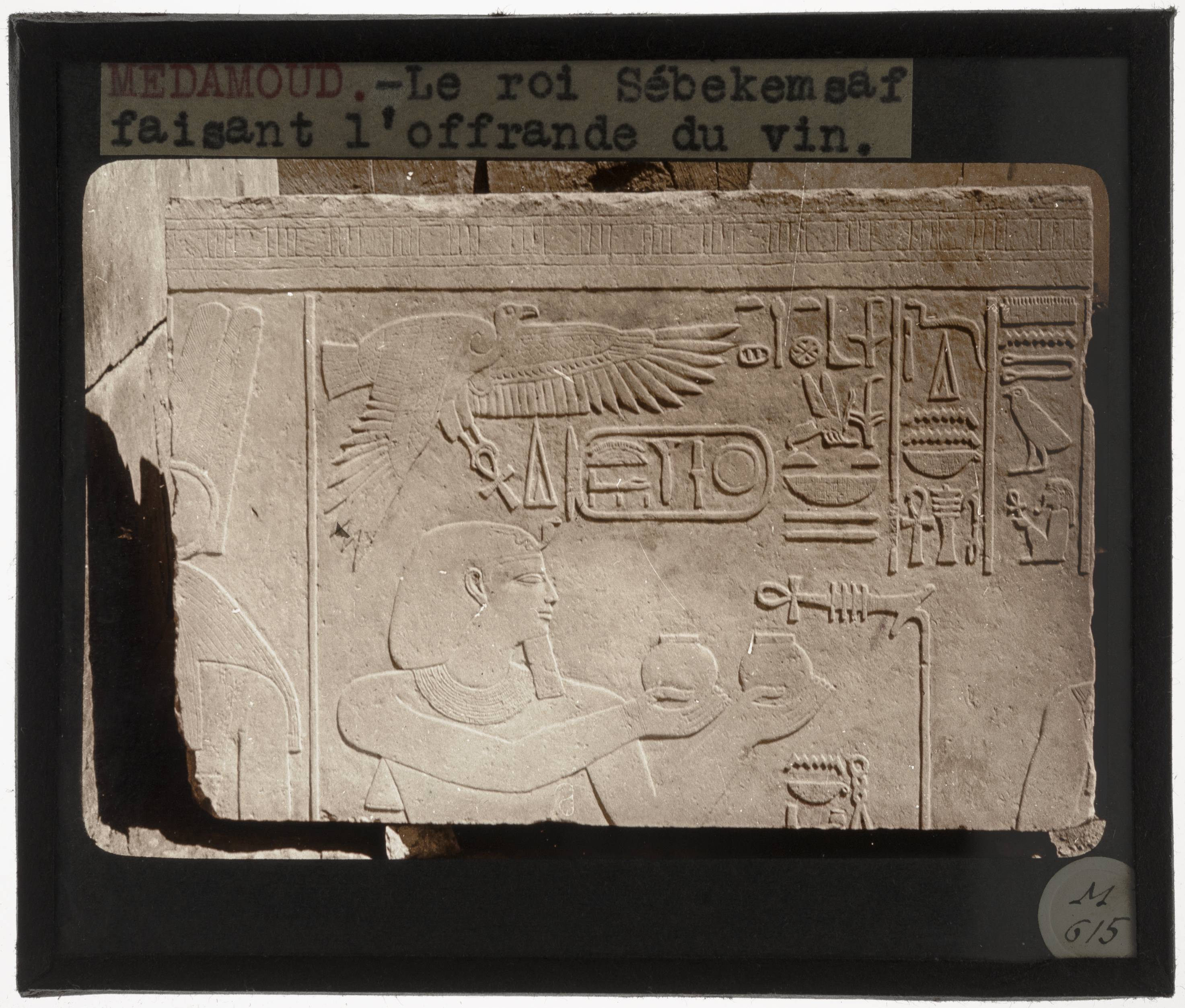
Sobekemsaf I offering wine at the Temple of Monthu at Medamud

He extensively restored and decorated the Temple of Monthu at Medamud where a fine high relief of this king making an offering before the gods has survived. A sandstone column of this king has survived into the modern era.

- Cairo, Louvre, Medamud magazine | architectural elements from the temple.(JE 44945a, 44946, 44947, 44950b-d)
- Karnak Open Air Museum | Decorations on the interior of a Gateway of Senusret III.
- Madamud magazine | A donation text on the base of a colossal statue previously usurped by Sobekhotep III from an earlier king. Ryholt (1997:146) notes that Sobekemsaf I did restoration to the temple and had architraves made for a hall with the names of Sobekhotep III.

=== Other finds ===
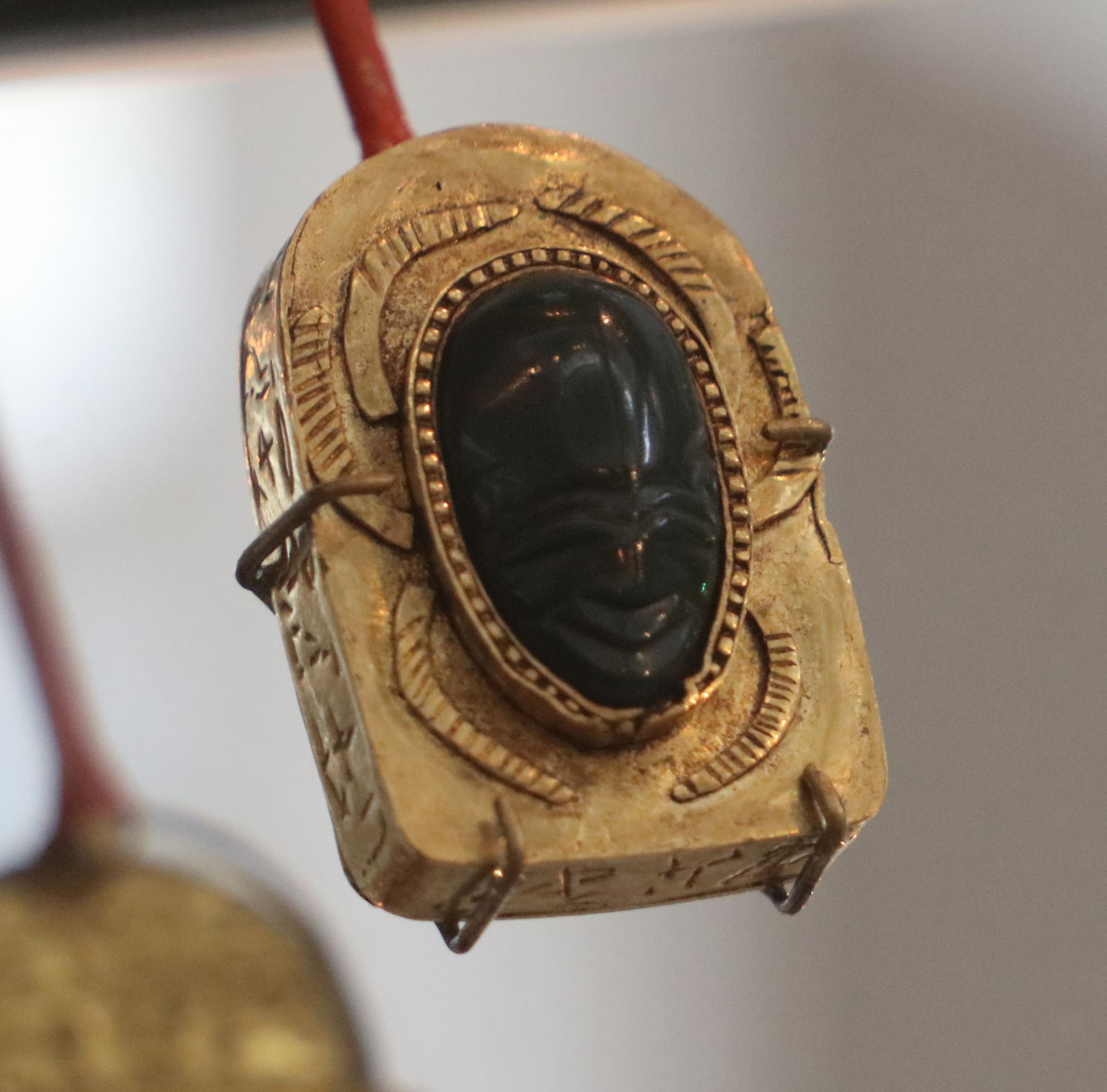
Sobekemsaf I's heart scarab today in the British Museum

- BM EA 7876 | At Dra Abu el-Naga (?), a heart scarab with the royal name Sobekemsaf (nomen).
- Leiden AH 216 | At Dra Abu el-Naga (?), a canopic box (35x43x48 cm) with the royal name Sobekemsaf (nomen).
- Cairo JE 38030/CG 17011 | At Karnak, an obelisk found in the cachette of the great temple.
- Present location unknown | At Karnak, a lintel.
- BM EA 871 | At [Karnak], a red granite seated statue (164 cm) with a dedication to Amun, Lord of the Thrones of the Two Lands.
- Petrie Museum 14209 | At Karnak, a statuette.
- Present location unknown | At Deir el-Bahri, a block.
- Present location unknown | At Tod, a pedestal and block fragment.
- Turin Museo Egizio Supl. 12053+12054 | At Gebelein, a shrine.
- Aswan Museum 1364 | At Elephantine, a dyad-statue.
- IFAO Cairo | Provenance unknown, an obelisk.
- Cairo CG 42029 (JE 37420) | At Karnak, a statuette of king striding (30 cm) in the cachette of royal statues at the great temple, of Sobekemsaf.
- Cairo JE 54858 | Papyrus columns and lintel with the names of Sobekhotep III and Sobekemsaf.

=== Non-contemporary attestations ===
==== Karnak King List ====
The Karnak King List 54 (48) mentions the prenomen Sekhemre Wadjkhau. The cartouche next to him is lost.

== Theories ==
=== Position within the 17th dynasty ===
==== After the Intef kings ====
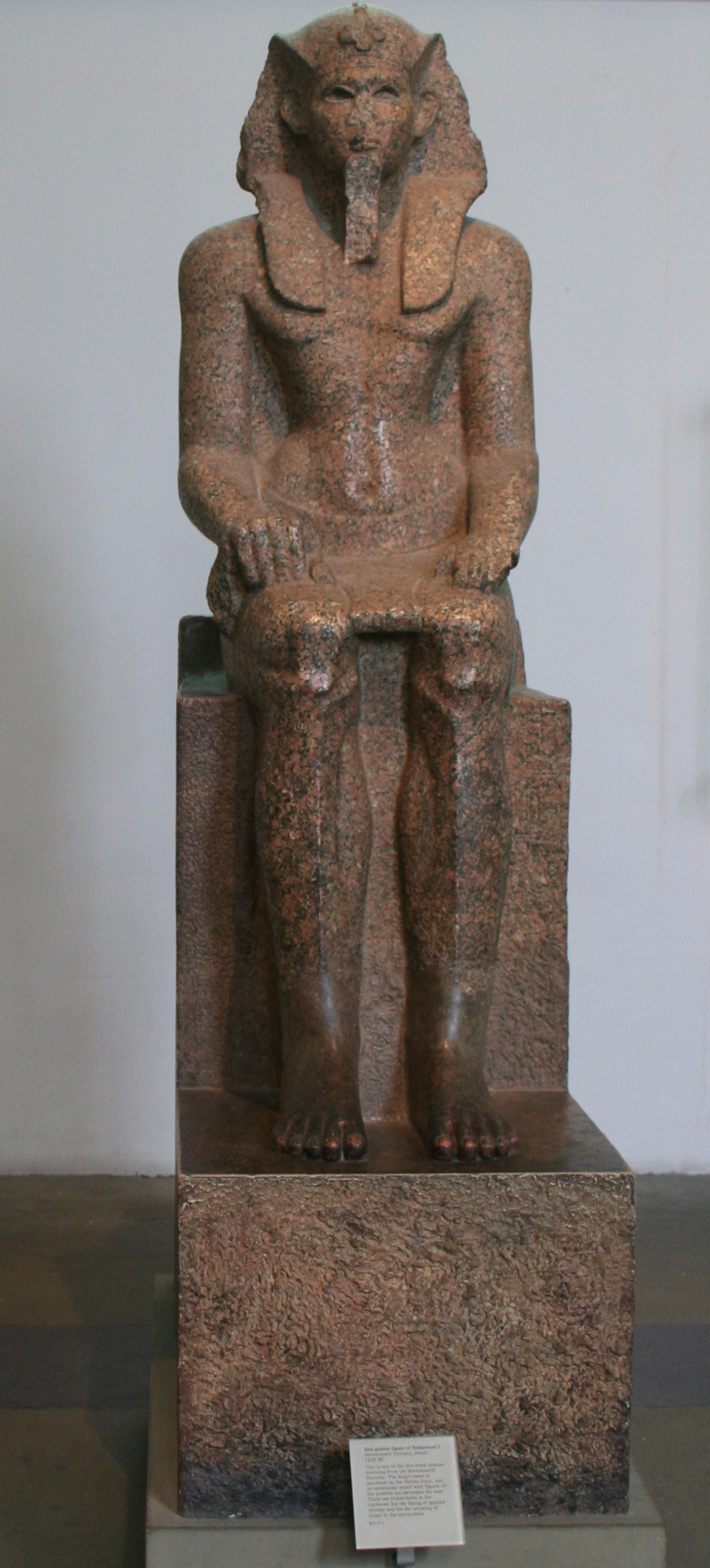
A red granite statue of Sekhemre Wadjkhaw Sobekemsaf (British Museum)

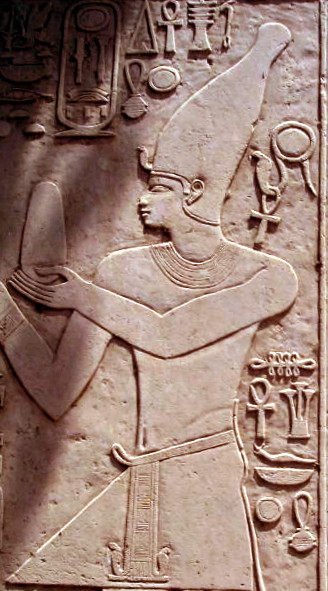
Relief of Sobekemsaf I at the Temple of Monthu (Medamud)

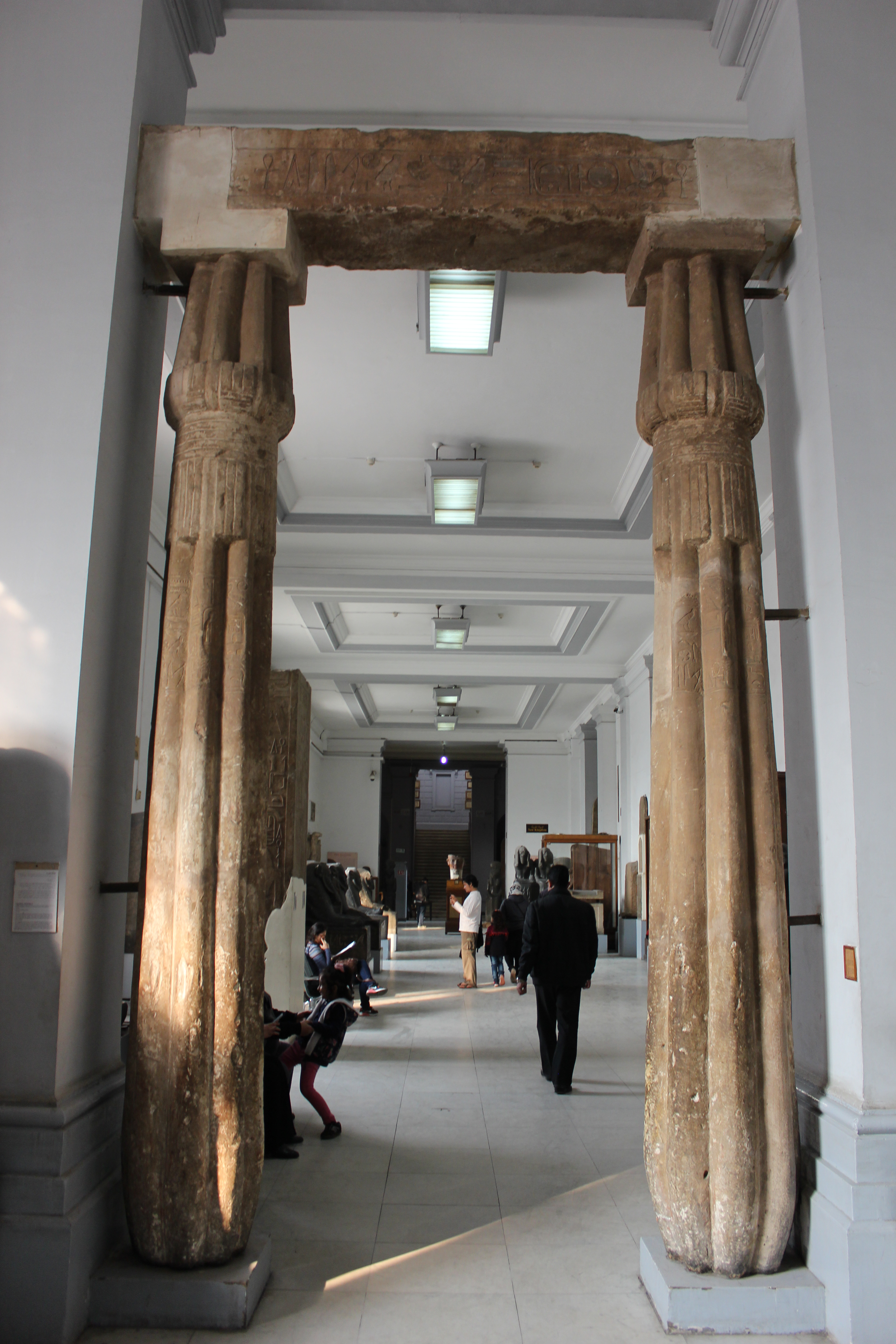
Sobekemsaf I's sandstone columns and architrave

Aidan Dodson dates Sekhemre Wadjkhaw Sobekemsaf's reign after those of Djehuti and Sekhemre-Wepmaat Intef. First, he remarks that Sobekemsaf's canopic chest is slightly larger—4.1 cm longer and 3.4 cm higher—than the canopic chests belonging to the latter two kings. He also points to the fact that the inscriptions on Sekhemre Wadjkhaw Sobekemsaf's box were "written vertically, rather than in the horizontal arrangement found on those of Djehuti and Sekhemre Wepmaet [Intef]."

The Danish Egyptologist Kim Ryholt similarly dated Sobekemsaf I's reign after those of Sekhmre-Wepmaat Intef and Nubkheperre Intef. First, he remarked that a "king's son Antefmose" (or Intefmose) is praised by a king Sobekemsaf for his role during a festival of Sokar on statuette BM EA 13329. But, according to Ryholt, "in any case the name Antefmose is basilophorous" and so the king Sobekemsaf who praised him must have been a successor" of the Intef kings, "to one of whom the name (Antefmose) refers." Furthermore, since Sekhemre Wadjkhaw Sobekemsaf I's son and presumable successor was also named Sobekemsaf rather than Intef, Ryholt concluded that this king must have ruled after the Intef kings.

Secondly, Ryholt suggested that Sobekemsaf Wadjkaw ruled after Nubkheperre Intef because while the former ruler carried out extensive restoration works at the temple of Monthu at Medamud, "there is no trace" of Nubkheperre Intef there. For Ryholt, this "may suggest that this temple was restored and put into service again only after Sekhemre Wadjkhaw Sobekemsaf reign". Consequently, Ryholt concluded that Sekhemre Wadjkhaw Sobekemsaf ruled after Nubkheperre Intef and should be numbered as Sobekemsaf II.

==== Before the Intef kings ====
In 2001, Daniel Polz rediscovered Nubkheperre Intef's tomb at Dra' Abu el-Naga'. He argues that Nubkheperre Intef ruled very late in the 17th dynasty. This means that Sekhemre Wadjkhaw Sobekemsaf could not have reigned between the Intef line of kings and the final three 17th dynasty Ahmoside family of kings (Senakhtenre, Seqenenre and Kamose). From inscriptions found on a doorjamb discovered in the remains of a 17th Dynasty temple at Gebel Antef on the Luxor-Farshut road, it is known today that Nubkheperre Intef and, by implication, his brother and immediate predecessor on the throne—Sekhemre-Wepmaat Intef—were sons of one of the two Sobekemsaf kings. This king was most likely Sekhemre Shedtawy Sobekemsaf II since Sekhemre Wadjkhaw Sobekemsaf's son was also named Sobekemsaf. Ryholt's interpretation of the lineage here has also been accepted by the British Egyptologist Aidan Dodson.

Polz also accepts this view but he placed Nubkheperre Intef just prior to the three final Ahmoside kings of the 17th dynasty in his 2003 book. Since then, he has inserted Sekhemre-Heruhirmaat Intef as a short-lived successor of Nubkheperre before Senakhtenre but his hypothesis remains essentially the same: Polz maintains that Sekemre Wadjkhaw Sobekemsaf I was the father of Sekhemre Shedtawy Sobekemsaf. Indeed, this king's son is known from the statue at Abydos to have also held the name Sobekemsaf and is designated as this king's successor on the same statue. Polz states that this is the most plausible reconstruction of the relationship between the two kings with the name Sobekemsaf in the 17th dynasty. Hence, Sekhemre Shedtawy Sobekemsaf would be Sobekemsaf II—Sobekemsaf I's son and successor—while Sekhemre-Wepmaat Intef and Nubkheperre Intef would be grandsons of Sekhemre Wadjkhaw Sobekemsaf I. This ultimately implies that Sekhemre Wadjkhaw Sobekemsaf ruled early in the 17th dynasty, before the Intef kings and that he must be numbered Sobekemsaf I.

Polz's hypothesis and placement of Nubkheperre Intef as one of the last kings in the Sobekemsaf-Intef family line is also supported "by the evidence of the box of Minemhat, who was governor of Coptos" in Year 3 of Nubkheperre Intef. This box "was part of the funerary equipment of an Hornakht (formerly known as 'Aqhor' in the past literature) who lived under Seqenenre." While no one knows precisely when Hornakht died, the fact that his funerary equipment contained a box which belonged to Minemhat suggests that Nubkheperre Intef and Seqenenre Tao ruled closely in time and that their reigns should not be separated by the intrusion of various other long lived kings of the 17th dynasty such as Sekhemre Wajdkhaw Sobekemsaf I who is attested by a Year 7 inscription. As the late Middle Kingdom German Egyptologist Detlef Franke (1952–2007) succinctly wrote in a journal article which was published in 2008—a year after his death:

Contrary to Ryholt, I see no place for a king Sobekemsaf who ruled after Nubkheperra Antef. Nubkheperra Antef (c.1560 BC) is the best attested (from Abydos to Edfu, e.g. BM 631, EA 1645, coffin 6652) and [the] most important of the three Antefs.

In addition, Polz argued that Ryholt's rejection of the evidence in Cairo Statue CG 386—which named king Sekhemre Wadjkhaw Sobekemsaf's son as another Sobekemsaf—in not giving any indication of the sequence of the known 17th dynasty Theban rulers is untenable. While Ryholt acknowledges in his 1997 book on the Second Intermediate Period that Anthony Spalinger suggested the prince Sobekemsaf who is attested in "a statue from Abydos (Cairo CG 386)" and "has the additional title of prophet, may be identical with Sobkemsaf II Sekhemreshedtawy", Ryholt simply writes that:

this identification is not possible with the [i.e., my] present arrangement of the two Sobkemsaf kings according to which one Sobkemsaf, Sekhemreshedtawy, ruled before to the Antef group [of kings] and the other, Sekhemrewadjkhaw, after them.

Polz notes that although Sekhemre Wadjkhaw Sobekemsaf ruled in a time during the Second Intermediate Period when few documentary sources exist, one cannot simply accept Ryholt's theory that Sekhemre Wadjkhaw Sobekemsaf I's son and designated successor did not succeed his own father as the next king merely because Ryholt's hypothesis did not allow another Sobekemsaf to follow Sekhemre Wadjkhaw Sobekemsaf on the throne due to his theory of the succession of 17th dynasty kings as being: Sekhemre-Shedtawy Sobekemsaf->Sekhemre-Wepmaat Intef->Nubkheperre Intef->Sekhemre-Heruhirmaat Intef->Sekhemre Wadjkhaw Sobekemsaf->Senakhtenre->etc. Indeed, Polz stresses rather that it is more logical to view Sekhemre Wadjkhaw Sobekemsaf I as a predecessor of the Intef line of kings instead; his known son, the Prince Sobekemsaf on Cairo Statue CG 386, would then be the future king Sekhemre Shedtawy Sobekemsaf II and father of two of the three Intef kings: Sekhemre-Wepmaat Intef and Nubkheperre Intef based on a doorjamb found on the Luxor-Farsut road in 1992-93 (the doorjamb mentions a king Sobekem[saf] as the father of Nubkheperre Intef--[Nubkheperre] Antef/[Intef] begotten of Sobekem...—but this king must be king Sobekemsaf II since Sobekemsaf Wadjkhaw Sobekemsaf's son was named Sobekemsaf based on Cairo Statue CG 386).

The British Egyptologist Aidan Dodson also endorses this interpretation of the doorjamb's text and writes:

Ryholt does...introduce the new "Desert Roads" evidence from the Darnells' survey to show that Nubkheperrre Inyotef (dubbed by Ryholt "Inyotef N") was a son of [a king] Sobekemsaf, thus providing a key genealogical link within the [17th] dynasty.

Polz's own theory of the royal succession of the 17th Theban dynasty kings is: Rahotep-->Sekhemre Wadjkhaw Sobekemsaf I-->Sekhemre-Shedtawy Sobekemsaf II-->Sekhemre-Wepmaat Intef->Nubkheperre Intef->Sekhemre-Heruhirmaat Intef->Senakhtenre-->Seqenenre-->Kamose.

=== Polz's critique of Ryholt's view on Intefmose ===
Daniel Polz also rejected Ryholt's arguments that the praise which a certain king Sobekemsaf lavished onto a king's son named Antefmose or Intefmose on statuette BM EA 13329 has any chronological implications regarding the temporal position of this king after the Intef kings. Polz writes that Ryholt's so-called Point 3:

is implicitly assuming that persons with the name Intef formed on the name of two (or three) kings of that name at the time of the 17th Dynasty can be related, yet [this] completely ignores the fact that these kings themselves chose their own names in conscious style of the same kings of the early 11th dynasty - including even assuming additional names such as ("the Great") as [in the case of] Wep-maat Intef. Ryholt's argument on this point do not make sense. Even if one assumes that the prince [named Intefmose] followed one of the Intef 17th Dynasty kings and he was hence a contemporary of the successor of this [Intef] ruler, [this is] but an interpretation that the Prince was honoured at the statue of a ruling king Sobekemsaf - only then would Ryholt's argument with regards to the 17th Dynasty ruler sequence prove meaningful. In contrast, if the [Intefmose] statuette and, therefore, the Prince was chronologically younger than the Intef-kings, and a successor of king Sobekemsaf was recognized, a worship of the prince by a king Sobekemsaf says nothing about the temporal position of the latter [pharaoh] and thus [of] the succession of the [17th dynasty] rulers of that time.

== Burial ==
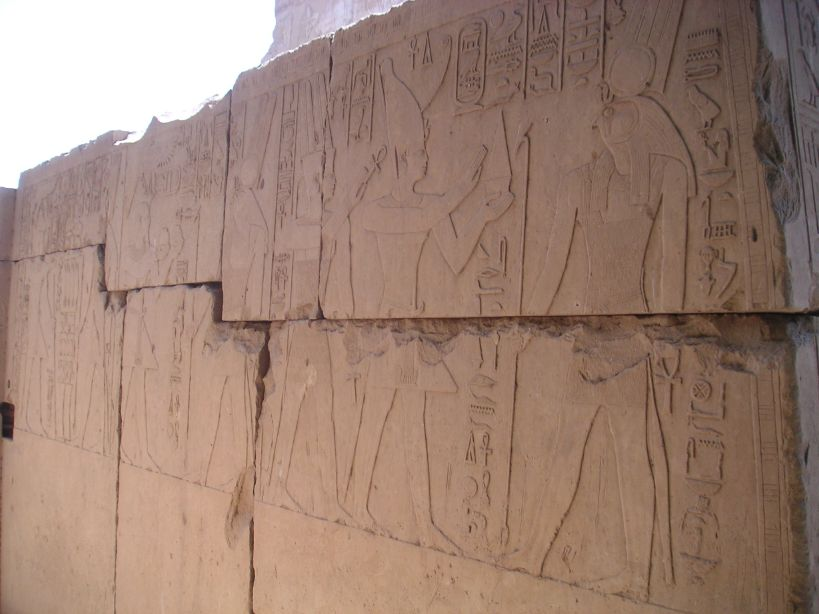
Relief of Sekhemre Wadjkhaw Sobekemsaf at the Temple of Karnak

The "burial equipment of Sobekemsaf [Wadjkhaw] does not contain his prenomen or royal name, but can nevertheless be assigned with certainty to this king" since the tomb of Sobekemsaf Shedtawy (ie. Sobekemsaf II) "was thoroughly robbed in antiquity" and set on fire by tomb robbers as recorded in Papyrus Abbott III 1-7. Sobekemsaf I Wadjkhaw was likely buried in Dra' Abu el-Naga' and his tomb was only found and looted in the late 19th century. On this basis, Kim Ryholt assigns a large heart-scarab, "which was, and indeed still is, set in a large gold mount" containing the name of 'Sobekemsaf' to Sekhemre Wadjkhaw Sobekemsaf I here since the tomb robbers would not overlook such a large object on the mummy of the king if it came from Sobekemsaf II's robbed and burned tomb. For much the same reason, a wooden canopic chest also bearing the name 'Sobekemsaf' on it has also been attributed to this king by Ryholt and Aidan Dodson. In contrast to the extensive damage that might have been expected had the chest been in the burned and looted tomb of Sobekemsaf II, "the damage suffered by Cat. 26 (i.e., Sobekemsaf I's chest) is minor, consistent with what it might have suffered at the hands of Qurnawi dealers."

Preceded by Rahotep	Pharaoh of Egypt; Seventeenth Dynasty	Succeeded by Sobekemsaf II
