= Sobekemsaf (queen) =

- Great Royal Wife; Khenemetneferhedjet
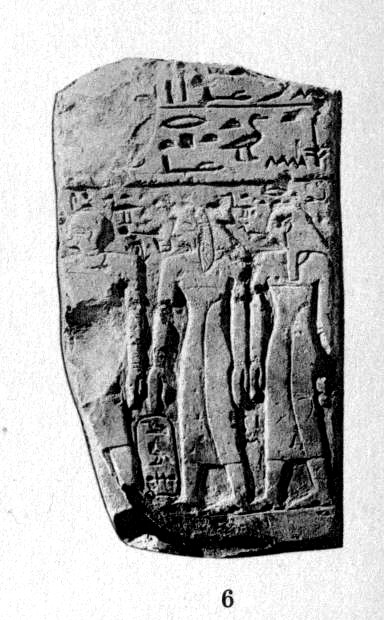
- Stela depicting queen Sobekemsaf (center) along with other relatives.
- Spouse: Nubkheperre Intef
- Dynasty: 17th of Egypt
- Father: unnamed father, Rahotep?
- Mother: unnamed queen

Sobekemsaf (sbk-m-z3=f) was an ancient Egyptian queen of the 17th Dynasty.

== Family ==
She was the wife of king Nubkheperre Intef and sister of an unidentified pharaoh, probably Sekhemre-Heruhirmaat Intef, Sobekemsaf II or Senakhtenre Ahmose.

Her name ("Sobek protects him") is grammatically masculine. Although a female version of the name (sbk-m-z3=s) did exist, the queen is named Sobekemsaf in all sources, so it was not an error on the scribe's part, but she was probably named for an ancestor. Masculine names for females were not uncommon during the Second Intermediate Period.

Sobekemsaf's titles were: King's Wife (ḥm.t-nswt), Great Royal Wife (ḥmt-nỉswt wr.t), United with the White Crown (ẖnm.t-nfr-ḥḏ.t), King's Daughter (z3.t-nỉswt), and King's Sister (zn.t-nswt).

== Attestations ==
sbk m V16 f
Sobekemsaf
in hieroglyphs
Era: 2nd Intermediate Period
(1650–1550 BC)

Attestations indicate that she was closely associated with the city Edfu. She is also associated with king Nubkheperre Intef, see Ryholt 1997:394-395 File 17/4.

- Cairo JE 16.2.22.23 | At Edfu, a stela depicts queen Sobekemsaf along with other relatives; the stela names the queen's sister Neferuni and their mother, whose name is lost.

Jewelry perhaps from Edfu

- BM EA 59699-59700 | She is mentioned on a bracelet and a pendant with the royal name of Nubkheperre Intef, now both in the British Museum.
- BM E 57698 | A signet ring.
- Present location unknown | A pendant.

=== Non-contemporary attestations ===
- Cairo CG 34009/JE 27091 | In Edfu, her family's hometown, she is known from stelae. The stela, belonging to an official called Yuf dated to the 18th Dynasty, mentions reconstruction of her tomb.
