= SAK =

SAK, Sak or sak can stand for:

- Central Organisation of Finnish Trade Unions (Suomen Ammattiliittojen Keskusjärjestö in Finnish)
  - Finnish Federation of Trade Unions, forerunner of the Central Organisation of Finnish Trade Unions
- Secure attention key
- SAK Comedy Lab, an Improvisational Comedy Theater in Orlando, Florida, United States
- Steve Kaufman, nickname given by his mentor Andy Warhol
- Swiss Army Knife
- Studien zur Altägyptischen Kultur, an academic Egyptological journal
- The IATA airport code for Sauðárkrókur Airport, Skagafjörður, Iceland
- ISO 639-2 (alpha-3) code for the Shake or Sake language, spoken in Gabon
- Siumut Amerdlok Kunuk, a football and handball club in Greenland
- Mehmet Sak (born 1990), Turkish footballer

== See also ==
- Saks (disambiguation)
- Saak (disambiguation)
