= Sahak =

Sahak (Persian: سحاك, Armenian: Սահակ) may refer to:

- Sahak (given name), an Armenian masculine given name, including a list of people
- Aidil Sharin Sahak (born 1977), Singaporean football head coach and former player
- Rahimullah Sahak (born 1999), Afghan cricketer
- Sahak, a supporting character in the novel Barabbas

== See also ==
- Sahak-e Abd ol Nabi, a village in Khuzestan Province, Iran
- Sahak-e Yareyeh, a village in Khuzestan Province, Iran
- Ashot-Sahak of Vaspurakan (died 991), King of Vaspurakan
