= Saak =

Saak or SAAK may refer to:

- Saak (film), 2019 Indian Punjabi-language romantic drama film
- Eta Boötis, a binary star in the constellation of Boötes that also bore the traditional names Muphrid and Saak
- Martín García Island Airport, in Argentina having the ICAO sign SAAK
- an alternative of the Armenian name Sahak or Sahag (for the name Isaac)
- a name for pinenut in several Ohlone languages of California

== People with the given name ==
- Saak Karapetyan (1960–2018), Russian deputy attorney general of Armenian descent

== See also ==
- Saag
- Sak (disambiguation)
