= Haankhes =

Egyptian queen consort

HA anx s
Haankhes
in hieroglyphs
Era: 2nd Intermediate Period
(1650–1550 BC)

Haankhes (ḥ3-ˁnḫ=s, "may she live") was an ancient Egyptian queen consort during the Second Intermediate Period to an unknown Pharaoh.

== Attestation ==
She is only known from a stela of her son Prince Ameni. The stela was found in Koptos and it may be originally from Dendera; one half of it is in the Petrie Museum of Egyptian Archaeology, the other is in the Pushkin Museum. Ameni married Princess Sobekemheb, a daughter of Sobekemsaf I and Nubemhat.

Her only known title is "King's wife" (ḥmt-nỉswt).

== Theories ==
It was once proposed she was a wife of Pharaoh Sekhemre-Heruhirmaat Intef, prior to some clarification of the family tree of the 17th Dynasty. This is now very improbable, as she is placed in the same generation as Sobekemsaf I, who was likely the grandfather or great-grandfather of Intef.
