= Nubemhat =

Ancient Egyptian queen consort

- Queen consort of Egypt; Great Royal Wife
- Spouse: Sobekemsaf I
- Issue: Sobekemheb (King's Daughter)
- Dynasty: 13th Dynasty (late); 17th Dynasty (early); Second Intermediate Period
- Religion: Ancient Egyptian religion

nbw N33B N33A m HAt t
nbw-m-ḥ3t
Nubemhat
in hieroglyphs
Era: 2nd Intermediate Period
(1650–1550 BC)

Nubemhat was an ancient Egyptian queen of the Second Intermediate Period.

== Biography ==
Nubemhat (nbw-m-ḥ3t, Gold is at the front, Gold is a name for Hathor) was the wife of King Sekhemre Wadjkhaw Sobekemsaf I. She had the title ḥm.t-nswt-wr.t (Great Royal Wife). Sobemeksaf I and Nubemhat may date to the transition between the late 13th Dynasty and the early 17th Dynasty, a period of turmoil and several rulers competing for power.

=== Marriage ===
Nubemhat held the title "Great King's Wife", meaning she was the primary wife of Sobekemsaf I and her children of the first rank would inherit the throne. Sobekemsaf I may have had several wives, the others only holding the title "King's Wife". It is not known whether she had a son (royal heir) or if he survived to adulthood and became a king.

=== Children ===
A stela attests to her daughter, the King's Daughter Sobekemheb. The stela records that she married the "King's Son" Ameny, who was born to the King's Wife Haankhes (a secondary wife). It is unclear if Haankhes also was a wife of Sobekemsaf I or not, making this a marriage between half-siblings or if she was married to another king. Sobekemsaf I reigned at least into his seventh year (the highest attested), which indicates that his daughter must have been born before he became king if she was of age when married. The son-in-law Ameny may have been a few years older, but he did not hold any additional titles indicating that he held high offices. The couple may have married quite young.

== Attestation ==
Nubemhat is known from only two monuments.

1. At Denderah, two fragments of a stela mentions Sekhemre Wadjkhau and Nubemhat with king's daughter Sobekemheb, married to king's son Ameny, son of the queen Haankhes. One fragment was bought at Koptos.
2. At Kawa (Nubia), the lower part of a statue with her name and title.
