= Sobekemsaf II =

Egyptian king

Sekhemre Shedtawy Sobekemsaf
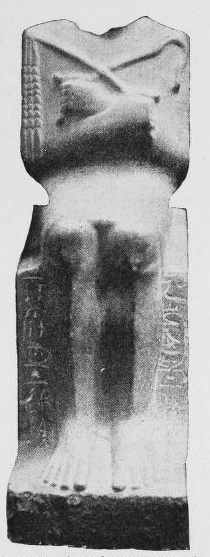
- Sitting osiride statuette of Sobekemsaf II, likely from Thebes.

Pharaoh
- Reign: c.1570s BC
- Predecessor: Sobekemsaf I
- Successor: Sekhemre-Wepmaat Intef
Royal titulary
Prenomen
Sekhemre Shedtawy
Sḫm-Rˁ-šd-t3.w(j)
Mighty Re, savior of the two lands

M23 X1 L2 X1	N5 S42 F30 N17 N17
Nomen
Sobekemsaf
Sbk m s3=f
Sobek protects him

G39 N5	I4 m V16 f
- Consort: Nubkhaes II
- Children: Sekhemre-Wepmaat Intef, Nubkheperre Intef
- Father: Sobekemsaf I
- Dynasty: 17th Dynasty of Egypt

Sekhemre Shedtawy Sobekemsaf II was an Egyptian king who reigned during the Second Intermediate Period, when Egypt was fragmented and ruled by multiple kings. He was a king of the Theban 17th dynasty because both he and Sobekemsaf II were the predecessors of Nubkheperre Intef who was certainly a Theban 17th dynasty king.

== Biography ==
His throne name, Sekhemre Shedtawy, means "Powerful is Re; Rescuer of the Two Lands". It is now believed by Egyptologists such as Kim Ryholt and Daniel Polz that Sobekemsaf II was the father of both Sekhemre-Wepmaat Intef and Nubkheperre Intef based on an inscription carved on a doorjamb discovered in the ruins of a 17th Dynasty temple at Gebel Antef in the early 1990s which was built under Nubkheperre Intef. The doorjamb mentions a king Sobekem[saf] as the father of Nubkheperre Intef/Antef VII--(Antef begotten of Sobekem...) He was in all likelihood the Prince Sobekemsaf who is attested as the son and designated successor of king Sobekemsaf I on Cairo Statue CG 386.

The British Egyptologist Aidan Dodson also endorses this new interpretation of the doorjamb's text and writes:

Ryholt does...introduce the new "Desert Roads" evidence from the Darnells' survey to show that Nubkheperrre Inyotef (dubbed by Ryholt "Inyotef N") was a son of [a king] Sobekemsaf, thus providing a key genealogical link within the [17th] dynasty.

In the Second Intermediate Period (SIP) there were two kings with the nomen Sobekemsaf: Sekhemre Shedtawy Sobekemsaf and Sekhemre Wadjkhau Sobekemsaf. In addition there is a prenomen Sekhemre Shedwaset, Powerful is Ra, Rescuer of Waset (gr. Thebes), which may be a local variation of Sekhemre Shedtawy. The names imply a time of turmoil where the city and land was in need of rescue. There were also a King's Son Sobekemsaf. Several private individuals and officials also had the name Sobekemsaf, like the reporter of Thebes Sobekemsaf who was the brother of a Queen Nubkhaes. The latter seem to have ascended the throne following the fall of the late 13th Dynasty, as her uncle High Steward Nebankh had served Neferhotep I and Sobekhotep IV. It is unclear if there were one or two queens named Nubkhaes. Attestations of Nubkhes (I) does not preserve the name of her husband, and the Papyrus Abbott assumes that Nubkhaes (II) found in the tomb of Sobekemsaf was his wife. The numbering of Sobekemsaf I and Sobekemsaf II can be confused, Ryholt (1997) has Sekhemre Shedtawy as Sobekemsaf I.

== Attestations ==
A list of attestations is provided by Ryholt 1997:393 File 17/2. In the preserved attestations only the prenomen and nomen are preserved.

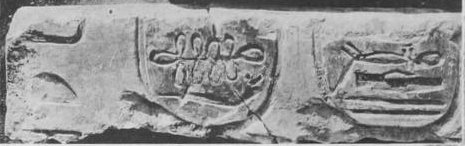
BM EA 38089

- BM EA 38089 | At Abydos, a limestone block with two cartouches containing the prenomen and nomen of Sobekemsaf II.
- MMA 25.3.330 | At Dra Abu el-Naga, a shrine fragment.
- MMA 25.3.229 | At Dra Abu el-Naga, a stela with the royal name Sobekemsaf (nomen) found together with the shrine (MMA 25.3.330), belonging to a private individual.
- BM EA 1163 | At Qurna, a triangular limestone stela of a contemporary temple scribe Sobekhotep with cartouches of Sobekemsaf II.
- Medinet Habu magazine | At the Luxor-Farshut Road, a door-jamb of a king Intef (nomen) with the royal name of Sobekemsaf (nomen), indicated as the father of Intef. The orthography indicates that Intef was Nubkheperre Intef.
- Present location unknown | At Thebes, a lintel.
- Cairo JE 85415 | Provenance unknown, a finger-ring.
- Present location unknown | At Dra Abu el-Naga(?), a small pyramid tomb.

Note that attestations with the nomen Sobekemsaf may belong to one of two kings, Sobekemsaf I or Sobekemsaf II.

=== Non-contemporary attestations ===
A series of attestations date to Ramesses IX at the end of the 20th Dynasty,

- BM EA 10221 "Pap. Abbott" | At Thebes, a document with inspection of pyramid-tomb.
- Brussels, Musées Royaux E.6857/Amherst 6 "Pap. Leopold/Amherst" | At Thebes, a document with investigation of violated pyramid-tomb.
- Vienna ÄS 3876 II:7 "Pap. Ambras" | At Thebes, an inventory list with references to document above.

==== The robbery of Sobekemsaf's tomb ====
The Abbott and Leopold-Amherst Papyruses, which are dated to Year 16 of Ramesses IX, state that this king's royal pyramid tomb was violated and destroyed by tomb robbers. The confessions and tomb robbery trials of the men responsible for the looting of Sekhemre Shedtawy Sobekemsaf's tomb are detailed in the latter papyrus which is dated to Year 16, III Peret day 22 of Ramesses IX. This document relates that a certain Amenpnufer, son of Anhernakhte, a stonemason from the Temple of Amun Re "fell into the habit of robbing the tombs [of noblemen in West Thebes] in company with the stonemason Hapiwer" and mentions that they robbed Sobekemsaf's tomb along with six other accomplices in Year 13 of Ramesses IX. Amenpnufer confesses that they

...went to rob the tombs...and we found the pyramid of [king] Sekhemre Shedtaui, the son of Re Sebekemsaf, this being not at all like the pyramids and tombs of the nobles which we habitually went to rob.

In his trial, Amenpnufer testifies that he and his companions dug a tunnel into the king's pyramid with their copper tools:

Then we broke through the rubble...and we found this god (king) lying at the back of his burial-place. And we found that the burial-place of Nubkhaes, his queen, situated beside him...We opened their sarcophagi and their coffins in which they were, and found the noble mummy of this King equipped with a falcon; a large number of amulets and jewels of gold were upon his neck, and his head-piece of gold was upon him. The noble mummy of this King was completely bedecked with gold, and his coffins were adorned with gold and silver inside and out and inlaid with all kinds of precious stones. We collected the gold on the noble mummy of this god...and we collected all that we found on her (the Queen) likewise; and we set fire to their coffins. We took their furniture...consisting of articles of gold, silver and bronze, and divided them amongst ourselves...Then we crossed over to Thebes. And after some days the District Superintendent of Thebes heard that we had been stealing in the west, and they seized me and imprisoned me in the office of the Mayor of Thebes. And I took the twenty deben of gold which had fallen to me as my portion and gave them to Khaemope, the scribe of the quarter attached to the landing place of Thebes. He released me, and I rejoined my companions, and they compensated me with a portion once again. Thus I, together, with other thieves who are with me, have continued to this day in the practice of robbing the tombs of the nobles and the [deceased] people of the land who rest in the west of Thebes.

Amenpnufer states that the treasures taken from the two royal mummies amounted to "160 deben of gold" or 32 lbs (14.5 kg).0500050740 The document ends with the conviction of the thieves—with a probable death sentence—and notes that a copy of the official trial transcripts was dispatched to Ramesses IX in Lower Egypt. Amenpnufer himself would have been sentenced to death by impalement, a punishment which "was reserved for [only] the most heinous crimes" in Ancient Egypt.

== Theories ==
=== Placement in the 17th Dynasty ===
He was once thought to belong to the late Thirteenth Dynasty, but is today believed to be placed as a king of the Seventeenth Dynasty of Egypt based on the doorjamb discovered in the ruins of a 17th Dynasty temple at Gebel Antef which shows he was likely the father of Nubkheperre Intef who was a 17th dynasty king of Thebes.

The German Egyptologist Daniel Polz, who rediscovered Nubkheperre Intef's tomb at Dra Abu el Naga', strongly maintains that Nubkheperre Intef ruled very late in the 17th Dynasty, which means that Sekhemre Wadjkhau Sobekemsaf (I) cannot have intervened between the Intef line of kings and the Ahmoside family of kings: Senakhtenre, Seqenenre and Kamose. Polz's hypothesis that Nubkheperre Intef ruled late in the 17th Dynasty is supported "by the evidence of the box of Minemhat, who was governor of Coptos" in Year 3 of Nubkheperre Intef "which was part of the funerary equipment of an Aqher who lived under Seqenenre [Tao]." This discovery strongly suggests that the reigns of Nubkheperre Intef and Seqenenre Tao were separated by only a few years in time rather than 15 to 20 years at a time when few pharaohs enjoyed long reigns in the 17th Dynasty. The late Middle Kingdom German Egyptologist Detlef Franke (1952–2007) also supported this view in an article which was published in 2008—a year after his death—where he wrote:

Contrary to Ryholt, I see no place for a king Sobekemsaf who ruled [Egypt] after Nubkheperra Antef.

Ryholt believed that Sekhemre Wadjkhaw Sobekemsaf intervened between the line of Intef kings and the accession of Senakhtenre—the first 17th Dynasty kings from the Ahmoside family line. Polz argues that Sekemre Wadjkhaw Sobekemsaf was instead the father of Sekhemre Shedtawy Sobekemsaf (II) and the grandfather of the Intef kings since a statue of Sekhemre Wadjkhaw Sobekemsaf shows that his eldest son was also named Sobekemsaf as both Polz and Anthony Spalinger note. This means that Sekhemre Wadjkhaw Sobekemsaf ruled on the throne before the Intef kings took power early in the 17th Dynasty—and that he would be Sobekemsaf I instead and the father of Sobekemsaf II. Since Sekhemre Shedtawy Sobekemsaf (II) himself is known to be the father of Nubkheperre Intef, this means that both he and Sobekemsaf I ruled Egypt before Sekhemre-Wepmaat Intef and Nubkheperre Intef assumed the throne. Sobekemsaf II would, therefore, be the son of Sobekemsaf I and the father of his two immediate successors: Sekhemre-Wepmaat Intef and Nubkheperre Intef.

Daniel Polz's own theory of the royal succession of the 17th Theban dynasty kings is: Rahotep-->Sekhemre Wadjkhaw Sobekemsaf I-->Sekhemre-Shedtawy Sobekemsaf II-->Sekhemre-Wepmaat Intef->Nubkheperre Intef->Sekhemre-Heruhirmaat Intef->Senakhtenre-->Seqenenre-->Kamose.

== Burial ==
The Tomb of Sobekemsaf has not been located. According to the Abbott Papyrus and the Leopold-Amherst Papyrus, which is dated to Year 16 of Ramesses IX, Sekhemre Shedtawy Sobekemsaf was buried along with his chief Queen Nubkhaes (II) in his royal pyramid tomb in the necropolis in the west opposite Thebes, most likely at Dra' Abu el-Naga'.

== Bibliography ==
- Ryholt, Kim: The Political Situation in Egypt during the Second Intermediate Period c.1800–1550 B.C, Museum Tuscalanum Press, (1997). ISBN 87-7289-421-0, 393 File 17/2.

Preceded by Sobekemsaf I	Pharaoh of Egypt; Seventeenth Dynasty	Succeeded by Sekhemre-Wepmaat Intef
