= Sekhemre-Heruhirmaat Intef =

Egyptian king

- Intef VII
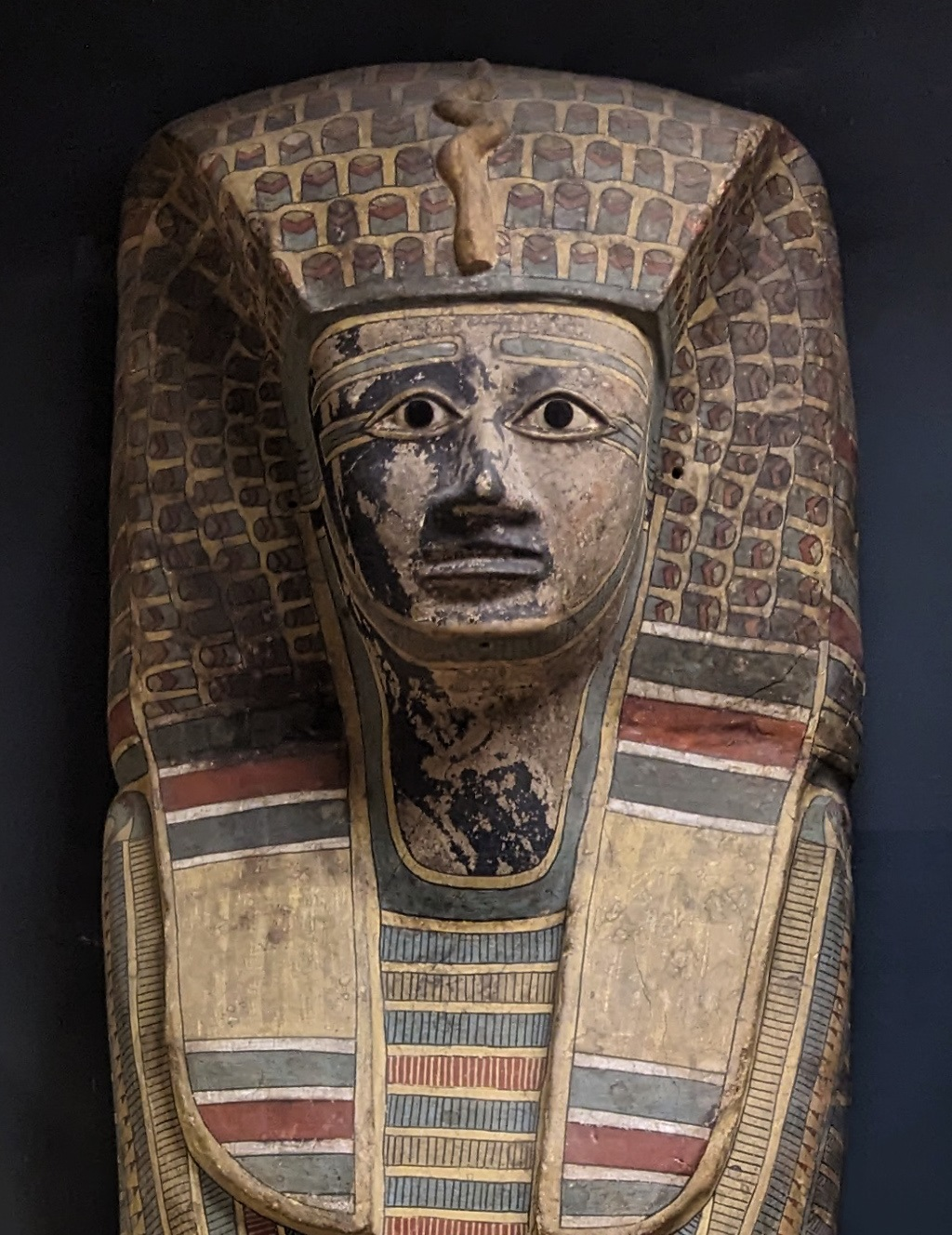
- Rishi coffin of Sekhemre-Heruhirmaat Intef, on display at the Louvre

Pharaoh
- Reign: 0 Years, x Months, x Days late 17th Dynasty; 16th century BC
- Predecessor: Nubkheperre Intef
- Successor: Senakhtenre Ahmose
Royal titulary
Prenomen
Sekhemre-Heruhirmaat
Sḫm-Rˁ-hrw-ḥr-M3ˁ.t
Mighty like Re is the one who satisfies Maat

M23 X1 L2 X1	N5 Y8 h r Hr Z1 Aa11 a
Nomen
Initef
Jnj-it.f
Intef (litt.: his father brought him)

G39 N5	W25 i n&t&f
- Father: Possibly Nubkheperre Intef
- Burial: Pyramid at Dra' Abu el-Naga'?
- Dynasty: 17th Dynasty

Sekhemre-Heruhirmaat Intef (or Antef, Inyotef, sometimes referred to as Intef VII) was an ancient Egyptian king of the Seventeenth Dynasty of Egypt, who ruled during the Second Intermediate Period, when Egypt was divided between the Theban-based 17th Dynasty in Upper Egypt and the Hyksos 15th Dynasty who controlled Lower and part of Middle Egypt.

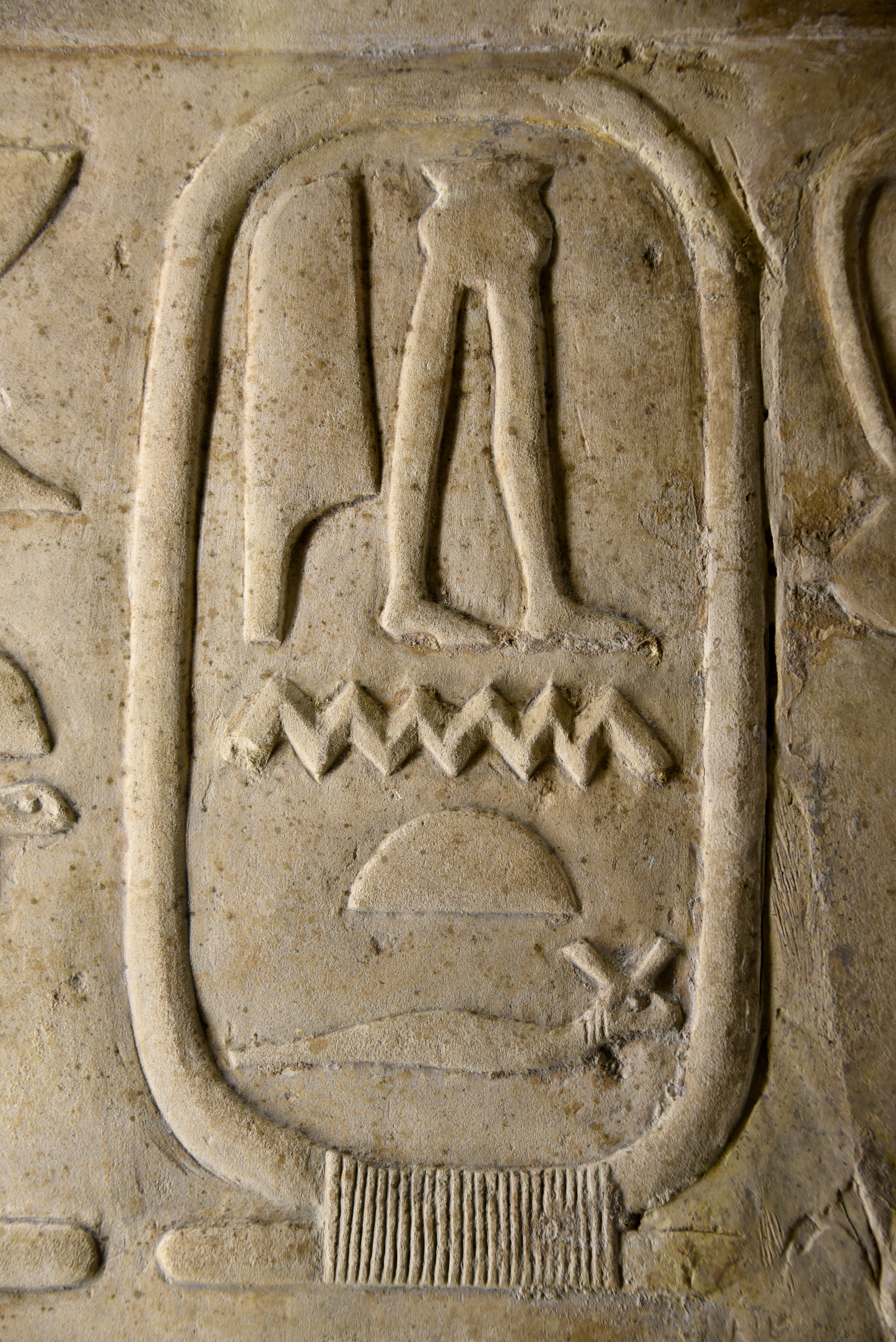
Cartouche of Sekhemre-Heruhirmaat Intef or Intef VIII, detail of a limestone block from Koptos

Sekhemre-Heruhirmaat Intef is referred to as Intef VII in some literature, while others refer to him as Intef VIII.

== Reign ==
Little more is known concerning the reign of this king except that he was a short-lived successor of Nubkheperre Intef. Sekhemre-Heruhirmaat Intef ruled for a brief period from Thebes.

Ryholt (1997) saw indications that Intef VIII did not have an independent reign, but was a coregent of Intef VII with a reign length set at 0 years.

=== Coptos, block ===
The Danish Egyptologist Kim Ryholt has argued that Sekhemre-Heruhirmaat Intef was possibly a co-regent of Nubkheperre Intef based on a block from Koptos, which preserves

... the nomen and prenomen of Antef N[ubkheperre] together with the unfortunately almost lost prenomen of another king. The prenomina of both kings are given the epithet di-ˁnḫ and since this was normally used only for the ruling king, it may be inferred that these kings co-reigned."

Ryholt observes that the length of the damaged cartouche would fit well with the long prenomen of Sekhemre-Heruhirmaat.

== Burial ==
It is believed he was buried in a pyramid tomb in the 17th Dynasty royal necropolis at Dra' Abu el-Naga' and that his tomb was only found and looted in the late 19th century.

=== Wooden Sarcophagus, Louvre E 3020 ===
His only clear attestation is his coffin – Louvre E 3020 – now in France. His sarcophagus contained the corrected nomen of this king as well as his prenomen, Sekhemre-Heruhirmaat, "which was added in ink on the chest of the coffin."

The coffin has led to significant debate. Dodson (1991) argued that Sekhemre-Heruhirmaat Intef was most probably a short-lived Theban king who died within months of his accession to power since the temple "scribes were probably still used to writing Inyotef in the manner of Nubkheperre [Intef] [sc. with the reed-leaf: in-it=f], leading to the corrected mistake on the coffin [of Sekhemre-Heruhirmaat Intef]". This would also explain the modesty of Sekhemre-Heruhirmaat Intef's coffin, which lacked a royal uraeus and is stylistically similar to the clearly non-royal coffin of Kamose. Intef, hence, would not have had the time to create a proper royal coffin in his abbreviated reign.

Ryholt (1997) suggested that Sekhemre-Heruhirmaat Intef died prematurely and was buried in a royal coffin that initially belonged to Nubkheperre Intef; hence, Sekhemre-Heruhirmaat Intef did not enjoy an independent reign of his own.

Dodson (2000) criticised Ryholt's proposal that Sekhemre-Heruhirmaat Intef died during the reign of his predecessor and was buried in Sekhemre-Wepmaat Intef's original royal coffin. Dodson observes that the form of the name Intef written here (which was originally similar to that used to designate Nubkheperre Intef before it was amended for Sekhemre-Heruhirmaat Intef) and the added king's prenomen of Sekhemre-Heruhirmaat on this king's coffin was composed in an entirely different hand from the remaining texts on the coffin. Dodson also stresses that:

On the matter of the coffins of the Inyotef kings, Ryholt fails to address the key point that the container used for Sekhemre-heruhirmaet (his "Inyotef H") is certainly a "stock" [i.e., non-royal] coffin, made lacking the deceased's name, to be inserted later—just as was that later used for the burial of Kamose. On this basis, there seems no possibility of the former having been the original coffin of Inyotef N, pressed into service for his prematurely defunct co-regent. The reviewer's previous explanation of the changed spelling of the nomen thus remains the most likely, and may also provide an explanation for the inclusion of the prenomen: in view of the confusion in the mind of the scribe, he made sure that the king was correctly identified in the Hereafter by adding his prenomen as well!

== Theories ==
In 2001, a team led by German Egyptologist Daniel Polz rediscovered the Tomb of Nubkheperre Intef at Dra Abu el-Naga. Polz (2007) places Sekhemre-Heruhirmaat Intef as a short-lived successor of Nubkheperre Intef, just prior to the accession of Senakhtenre Ahmose.

Preceded by Nubkheperre Intef	Pharaoh of Egypt; Seventeenth Dynasty	Succeeded by Senakhtenre Ahmose
