= Sahak-e Yareyeh =

Sahak-e Yareyeh سحاك يريح
- Village
- Location within Iran
- Coordinates: 31°55′16″N 48°37′54″E
- Country: Iran
- Province: Khuzestan
- County: Shushtar
- Bakhsh: Shadravan
- Rural District: Shoaybiyeh-ye Gharbi

Population (2006)
  - Total: 210
- Time zone: UTC+3:30 (IRST)
  - Summer (DST): UTC+4:30 (IRDT)

Sahak-e Yareyeh (Persian: سحاك يريح, also Romanized as Saḩāk-e Yareyeḩ; also known as Esḩāk-e Ḩājj Sheykh Mīrīyeh, Sahāk-e Parīḩ-e Yek, Seḩāk, and Şoḩāk) is a village in Shoaybiyeh-ye Gharbi Rural District, Shadravan District, Shushtar County, Khuzestan Province, Iran. At the 2006 census, its population was 210, in 43 families.
