= Nubkheperre Intef =

Egyptian king

- Intef VI
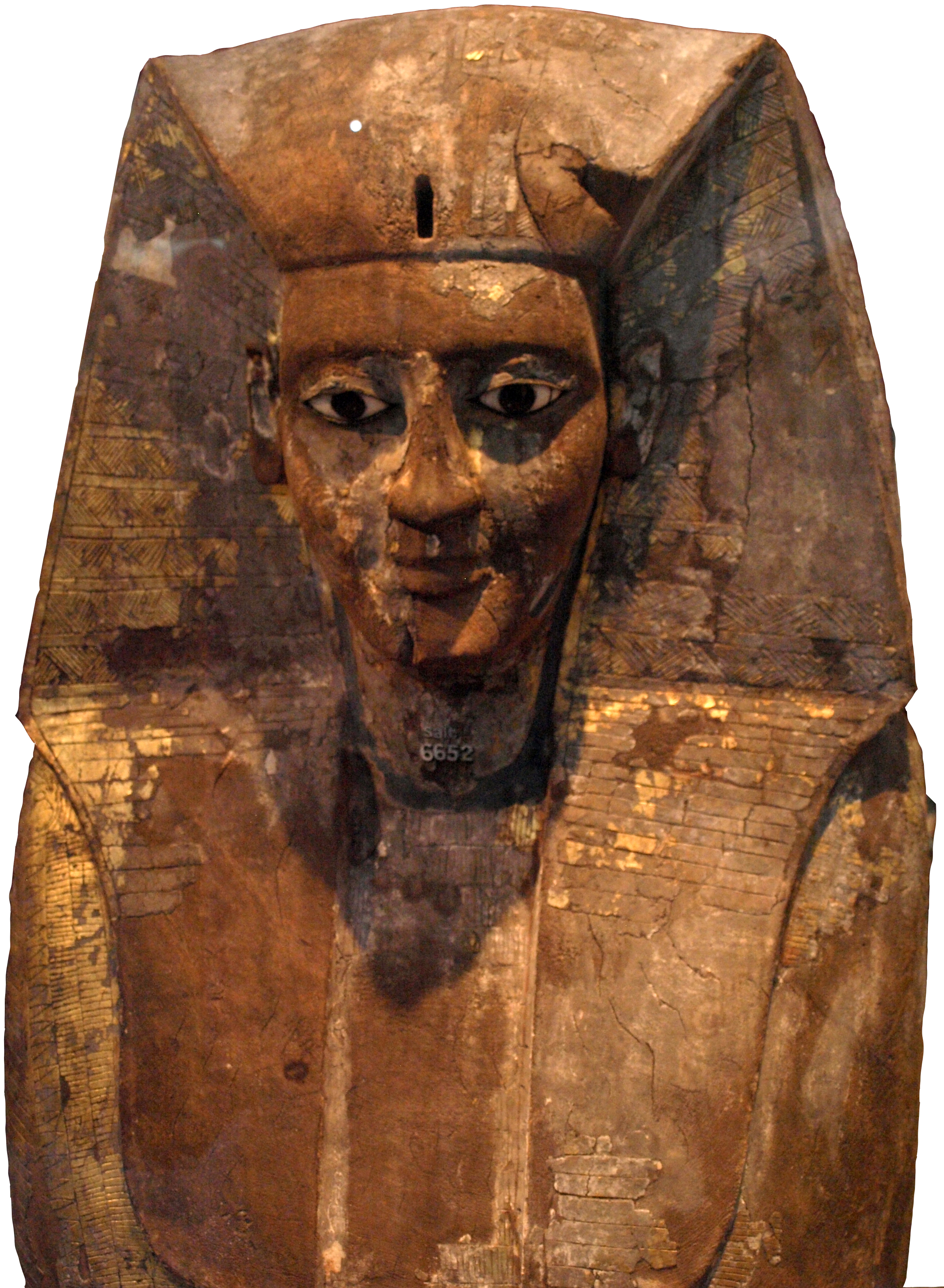
- Nebkheperre Intef's wooden Rishi coffin in the British Museum

Pharaoh
- Reign: Year 3 (highest att.) c.1571 to mid-1560s BC
- Predecessor: Sekhemre-Wepmaat Intef
- Successor: Sekhemre-Heruhirmaat Intef
Royal titulary
Horus name
Neferkheperu
nfr-ḫprw
Horus, he whose apparitions are perfect
G5	nfr L1 Z3
Nebty name
Heruhernesetef
Hrw-ḥr-nst=f
He who creates peace on his throne
G16	O4 r D2 Z1 W11 Z1 t f
Golden Horus
[...]neteru
[..]-nTrw
...-gods
G8	HASH R8A
Prenomen
Nebukhepere
Nbw-ḫpr-R՚
The golden apparition of Ra

M23 X1 L2 X1	N5 S12 L1
Nomen
Intef
Jnj it=f
His father brought him

G39 N5	W25 i n&t&f
- Consort: Sobekemsaf
- Father: Sobekemsaf II
- Burial: Pyramid at Dra' Abu el-Naga'
- Dynasty: 17th dynasty

Nubkheperre Intef (or Antef, Inyotef, sometimes referred to as Intef VI) was an Egyptian king of the Seventeenth Dynasty of Egypt at Thebes during the Second Intermediate Period, when Egypt was divided by rival dynasties including the Hyksos in Lower Egypt.

== Reign ==
=== Rise to power ===
A drawing by Auguste Mariette of the full royal titulary of Nubkheperre Intef.

He is known to be the brother of Sekhemre-Wepmaat Intef—and this king's immediate successor—since he donated Louvre Coffin E3019 for this king's burial which bears an inscription that it was donated for king Sekhemre Wepmaat Intef "as that which his brother, king Antef (Nubkheperre Intef here) gives", notes Kim Ryholt. As the German scholar Thomas Schneider writes in the 2006 book Ancient Egyptian Chronology (Handbook of Oriental Studies):

"From the legend on the coffin Louvre E 3019 (Sekhemre-Wepmaat's coffin), it follows that Inyotef Nebukheperre'...arranged the burial of his brother Inyotef Sekhemre'-upimaat...and must have therefore have followed him on the throne. In his Untersuchungen, Beckerath had viewed Inyotef Sekhemre'-upimaat (VI) and Inyotef Sekhemre-herhermaat (VII) as brothers, whereas he had separated Inyotef Nebukheperre' (VI; coffin BM 6652) from them as a king he considered not necessarily related to them, placing him at the beginning of the dynasty. Ryholt equally bases his arguments upon a consistent paleographic peculiarity (the Pleneschreibung of "j") in the case of the coffin of Inyotef Sekhemre-herhermaat. where only Nubkheperre Intef's nomen contained a reed-leaf of all the three Intef kings."

=== Intef's father ===
Nubkheperre Intef and, by implication, his brother Sekhemre Wepmaat Intef, were probably the sons of Sekhemre Shedtawy Sobekemsaf (Sobekemsaf II today) on the basis of inscriptions found on a doorjamb discovered in the remains of a 17th Dynasty temple at Gebel-Antef on the Luxor-Farshut road. The doorjamb mentions a king Sobekem[saf] as the father of Nubkheperre Intef/Antef VII--(Antef begotten of Sobekem...) The British Egyptologist Aidan Dodson also endorses Ryholt's interpretation of the doorjamb's text and writes:

Ryholt does...introduce the new "Desert Roads" evidence from the Darnells' survey to show that Nubkheperrre Inyotef (dubbed by Ryholt "Inyotef N") was a son of [Sekhemre-shedtawi] Sobekemsaf, thus providing a key genealogical link within the [17th] dynasty.

The German Egyptologist Daniel Polz, who discovered this king's tomb in 2001, also studied the same doorjamb and reached a similar conclusion in a 2007 German language book and in a 2010 article. An association between Nubkheperre Intef and a king Sobekemsaf is also indicated by the discovery of a doorframe fragment by John and Deborah Darnell in the early 1990s which preserved part of an inscription naming a king Intef ahead of a king Sobekemsaf; the hieroglyphic spelling of the king Intef here was that used only by Nubkheperre. Unfortunately, not enough of the inscription was uncovered to reveal the nature of the relationship with any certainty here—or which king Sobekemsaf was intended. Nubkheperre Intef is sometimes referred to as Intef VII, in other sources as Intef VI, and even as Intef V.

King Intef's wife was Sobekemsaf, who perhaps came from a local family based at Edfu. On an Abydos stela mentioning a building of the king are the words king's son, head of the bowmen Nakht.

=== Building program ===
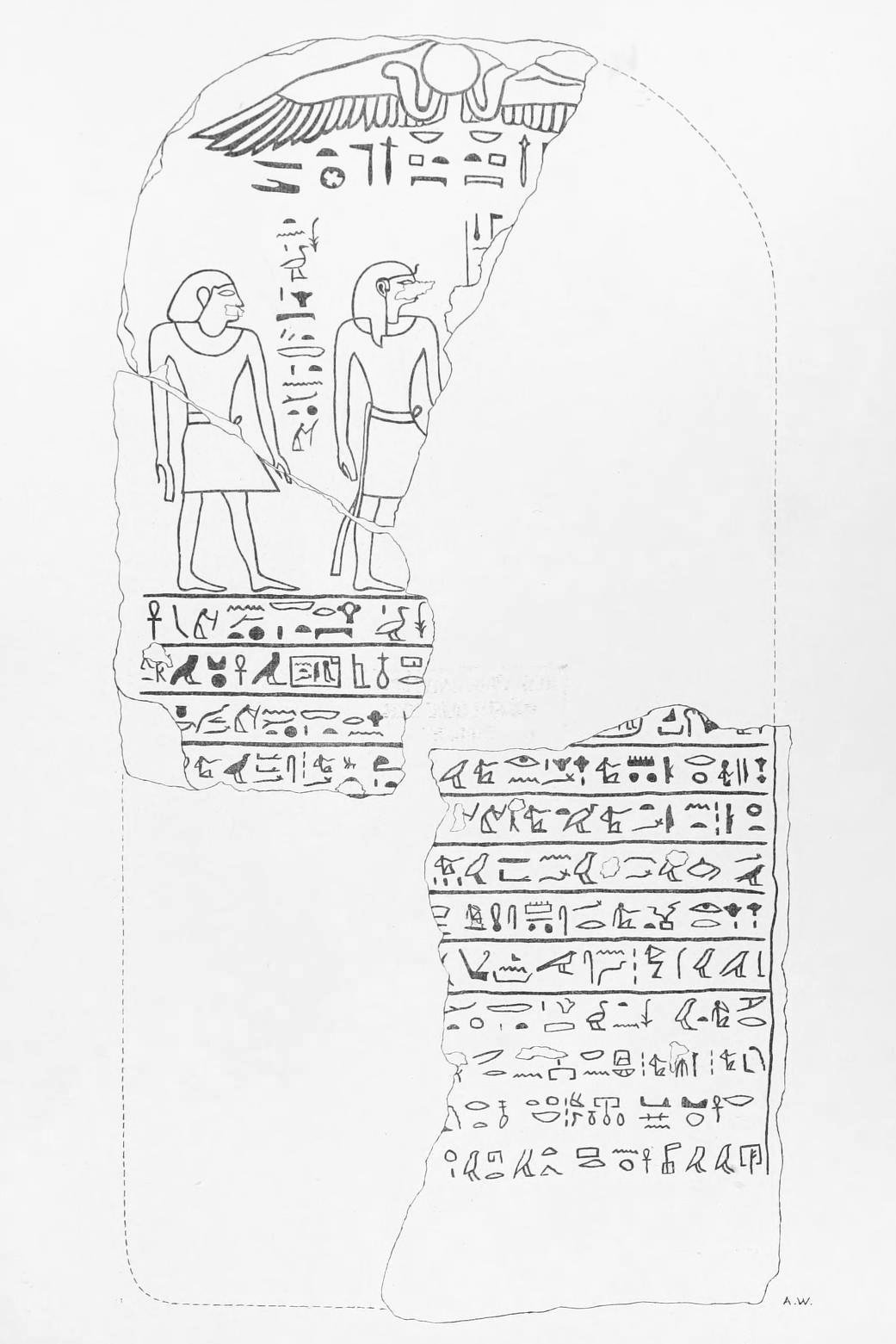
The stela depicting Nubkheperre and Nakht, from Abydos.

Nubkheperre Intef is one of the best attested kings of the 17th dynasty who restored numerous damaged temples in Upper Egypt as well as constructing a new temple at Gebel Antef. The best preserved building from his reign is the remains of a small chapel at Koptos. Four walls that have been reconstructed show the king in front of Min and show him crowned by Horus and by another god. The reliefs are executed in raised and sunken relief. At Koptos, the Coptos Decree was found on a stela which referred to the actions of Nubkheperre Intef against Teti, son of Minhotep. At Abydos, several stone fragments were found, including columns which attest to some kind of restoration work. On a stela found at Abydos, a mention is made of a House of Intef. This most likely refers to a building belonging to Nubkheperre Intef. Therefore, while Nubkheperre Intef's highest—and only known—year date is his Year 3 on the Koptos stela, this must be considered an underestimate since he must have ruled much longer to accomplish his ambitious building program and also complete his royal tomb. Indeed, Nubkheperre Intef is alone "mentioned on over twenty contemporary monuments" from his reign which demonstrates his position as one of the most powerful rulers of the Seventeenth Dynasty of Egypt.

== Attestations ==
A royal crown believed to have originated from Nubkheperre Intef's Dra' Abu el-Naga' tomb now located in the Rijksmuseum van Oudheden of the Netherlands.

Numerous attestations are known, see Ryholt 1997:394 File 17/4.

=== Abydos ===
- Present location unknown | At Abydos, architectural elements 2x blocks, 1x architrave.
- BM EA 631 | At Abydos, a relief.
- Cairo + Pennsylvania University Museum E 11512 | At Abydos, column fragments.
- Pennsylvania University Museum E 16021 | At Abydos, stela of treasurer.
- Chicago Oriental Institute 64 | At Abydos, stela of King's Son.

=== Koptos ===
- Present location unknown | At Koptos, blocks from chapel.
- Ashmolean 1894.106 |At Koptos, blocks from chapel.
- Berlin 12486-89 | At Koptos, blocks from chapel.
- Petrie Museum 14492, 14784, 14780, 14781, 14783, 14787, 14788, 14790 | At Koptos, blocks from chapel.
- Cairo JE 30770 bis | At Koptos, an inscription with a royal decree dated to Year 3, which mentions governor Minemhat of Coptos (PD 251) and King's Son and Commander of Koptos Qenen.

=== Thebes ===
- Medinet Habu magazine | At Luxor-Farshut Road, remains of a temple with door-jamb and grafitto.
- Lost in the Nile | At Dra Abu el-Naga, a pair of obelisks. Auguste Mariette found two broken obelisks with complete Fivefold Titulary, which was then subsequently lost when being transported to the Cairo Museum.
- BM EA 6652 | At Dra Abu el-Naga, a sarcophagus.
- Leiden AO 11a | At Dra Abu el-Naga, a collar fragment and diadem.
- BM EA 10706 | At Dra Abu el-Naga, a linen fragment with text.
- Louvre E 3019 | At Dra Abu el-Naga, a sarcophagus with dedication to brother.
- Cairo JE 67857 | At Deir el-Bahri, a wooden panel.
- In situ (?) | At Deir el-Bahri, a grafitti (nomen).
- Cairo Temp. 20.6.28.11 | At Karnak, a stela.

=== Edfu ===
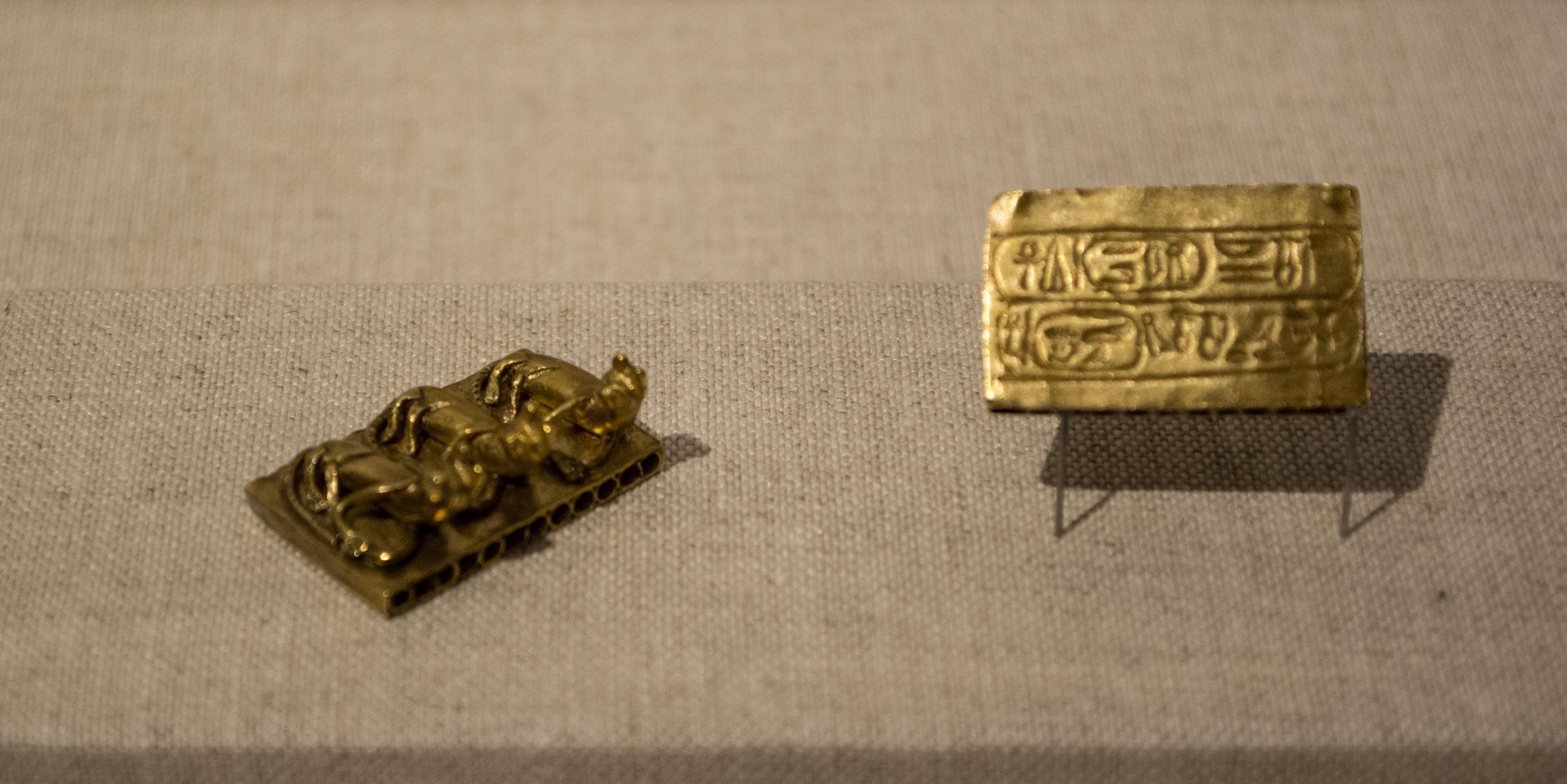
Nubkeperre Intef spacer bars inscribed with his cartouche.

- BM EA 59699-59700 | At [Edfu], jewellery of Queen Sobekemsaf naming Intef.
- BM EA 57698 | At [Edfu], a signet ring.
- Present location unknown | At [Edfu], a pendant.
- BM EA 1645 | At [Edfu], a stela of an individual with dedication to Horus of bhdty and Isis.

=== Non-contemporary attestations ===
- BM EA 10221 "Pap. Abbott" | At Thebes, document about inspection of pyramid-tombs.

== Theories ==
=== Late 17th Dynasty ===
Both Kim Ryholt and the German Egyptologist Daniel Polz concur that this pharaoh did not rule at or near the start of the 17th dynasty but rather late into the 17th dynasty just prior to the final three known kings of this dynasty (Senakhtenre, Seqenenre and Kamose).

=== Sequence ===
Ryholt (1997) reconstructed the sequence of 17th dynasty rulers with a king Sobekemsaf intervened between the last Intef king and Senakhtenre. Detlef Franke rejects this view (below) and argues that there is no space for a king Sobekemsaf to intervene in the space after Nubkheperre Intef. "Contrary to Ryholt, I see no place for a king Sobekemsaf who ruled after Nubkheperra Antef. Nubkheperra Antef (c.1560 BC) is the best attested (from Abydos to Edfu, e.g. BM 631, EA 1645, coffin 6652) and [the] most important of the three Antefs."

Polz (2007) places Sekhemre-Heruhirmaat Intef as a short-lived king between the reigns of Nubkheperre Intef and Senakhtenre Ahmose—the first ruler of the Ahmoside family of kings.

== Burial ==
At Dra' Abu el-Naga, the Tomb of Nubkheperre was rediscovered by an archaeological team led by Polz in 2001. The grave was originally covered with a small pyramid (approximately 11 m at the base, rising to a height of approx. 13 m.)

Nubkheperre Intef's tomb is mentioned in the Abbott Papyrus, which records an investigation into tomb robberies during the reign of Ramesses IX, about 450 years after Intef's interment. Although the authorities found a tunnel that was carved into the pyramid by tomb robbers, his tomb was mentioned as being "uninjured", as the tomb robbers were unable to locate and enter the burial chamber.

Nubkheperre Intef's tomb was originally penetrated by tomb robbers in 1827 but some of its treasures made it into the hands of Western collectors; his unique rishi style coffin was purchased by the British Museum from the Henry Salt collection where its catalogue number is EA 6652.

His tomb was later found by early Egyptologists around 1881 but knowledge of its location was lost again until it was rediscovered by German scholars under Daniel Polz, the deputy director of the German Archaeological Institute in 2001 at Dra' Abu el-Naga'. The coffin of Nubkheperre Intef was reportedly found in his tomb complete with a diadem or crown, some bows and arrows, and the heart-scarab of a king Sobekemsaf that may have been deposited from the lost tomb of Sobekemsaf I. Fragments of a pyramidion of Nubkheperre Intef were also found during excavations.

== Bibliography ==
- Ryholt, Kim S. B.; Bülow-Jacobsen, Adam (1997). The Political Situation in Egypt During the Second Intermediate Period, C. 1800-1550 B.C. Museum Tusculanum. ISBN 978-87-7289-421-8.

Preceded by Sekhemre-Wepmaat Intef	Pharaoh of Egypt; Seventeenth Dynasty	Succeeded by Sekhemre-Heruhirmaat Intef
