= Seventeenth Dynasty of Egypt =

Third Dynasty of the Ancient Egyptian Second Intermediate Period

- c. 1580 BC–c. 1550 BC
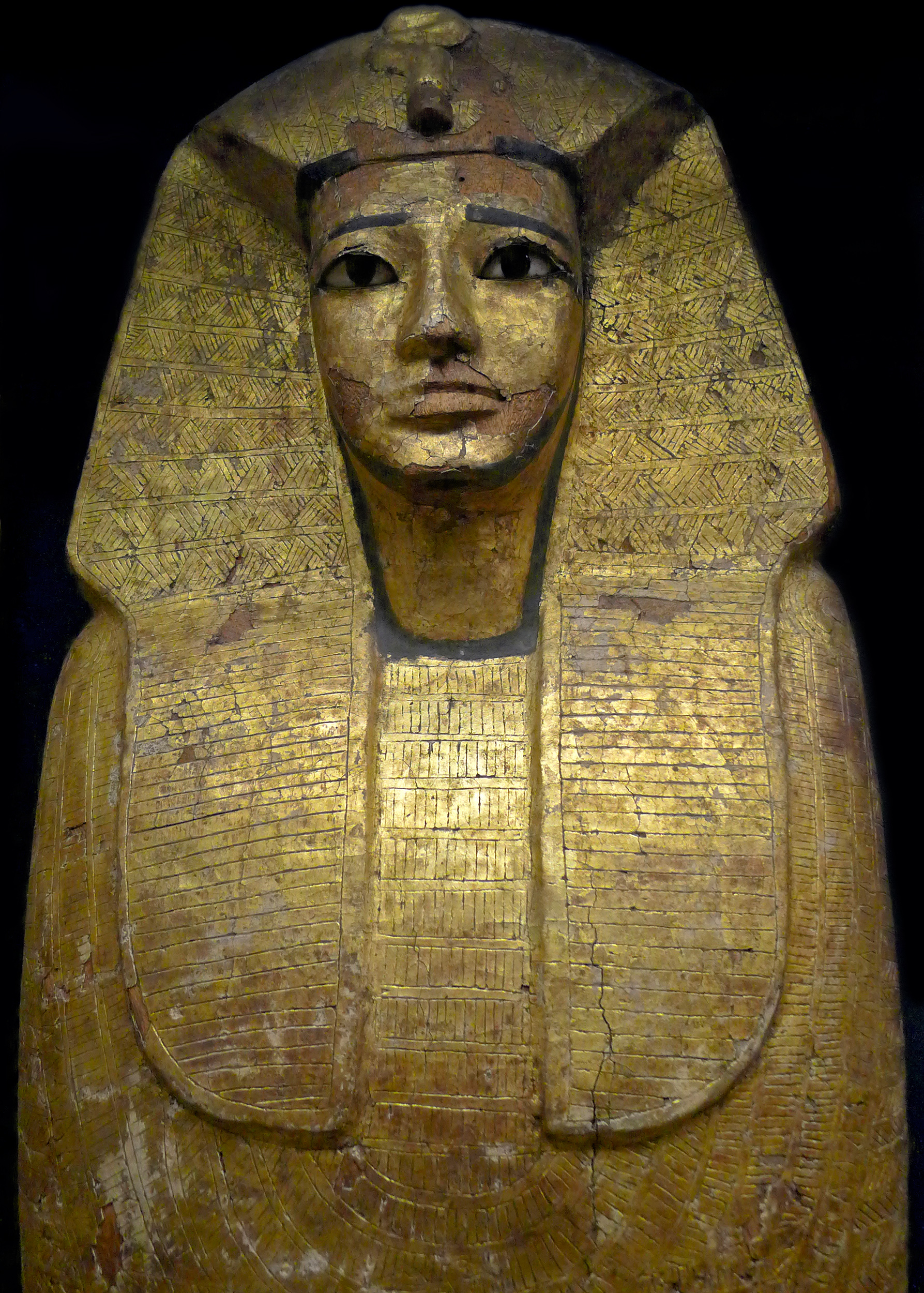
- Sarcophagus of Sekhemre-Wepmaat Intef, Louvre Museum
- Capital: Thebes
- Common languages: Egyptian language
- Religion: ancient Egyptian religion
- Government: Absolute monarchy
- Historical era: Bronze Age
  - Established: c. 1580 BC
  - Disestablished: c. 1550 BC
Preceded by	Succeeded by
Sixteenth Dynasty of Egypt; Abydos Dynasty	Eighteenth Dynasty of Egypt

The Seventeenth Dynasty of Egypt (notated Dynasty XVII, alternatively 17th Dynasty or Dynasty 17) was a dynasty of pharaohs that ruled in Upper Egypt during the late Second Intermediate Period, approximately from 1580 to 1550 BC. Its mainly Theban rulers are contemporary with the Hyksos of the Fifteenth Dynasty and succeed the Sixteenth Dynasty, which was also based in Thebes. The chronology of the 17th dynasty is very uncertain and the king lists provide little help.

The last two kings of the dynasty opposed the Hyksos rule over Egypt and initiated a war that would rid Egypt of the Hyksos kings and began a period of unified rule, the New Kingdom of Egypt. Kamose, the second son of Seqenenre Tao and last king of the Seventeenth Dynasty, was the brother of Ahmose I, the first king of the Eighteenth Dynasty.

== Origins ==
The founder of the dynasty was Rahotep and most scholars consider his dynasty to have been native to Egypt.

Some mainstream scholars have suggested that the Seventeenth dynasty of Egypt had Nubian ancestry due to the expanded presence of Nubians in Egypt during that time period and the craniofacial evidence from X-ray examination of Seqenenre Tao who displayed strong affinities with contemporary Nubians. Donald Redford explicitly argues that Egyptians "entered into the service of the king of Kush" between seventeenth and sixteenth centuries BC, citing historical texts along with archaeological evidence that showed an increased Nubian presence from the third Cataract on the Nile as far north as Deir Rifeh. Redford summarises that a shared "community of interest" existed which coincided with the influx of Nubian pottery and weapons in Upper Egypt.

== War with the Hyksos ==
While under the Hyksos rule, the kings of the 17th dynasty revived the cult of Osiris, reinforced the cult of Horus, rebuilt temples, and established military control over the religious site, Abdju. This was the beginning of their campaign for reunification.

The first wave of attacks launched toward the southern flank was led by King Seqenenre Tao, who was killed in the battle. His son, Kamose, succeeded him as the leader. After securing the southern flank, Kamose took to the North to fight more of the Hyksos. Despite little sustained opposition, he failed to take more land in the north and died suddenly after just 2 years at the throne. He left no sons behind to succeed him and his brother, Ahmose I, came to power at 10 years old.

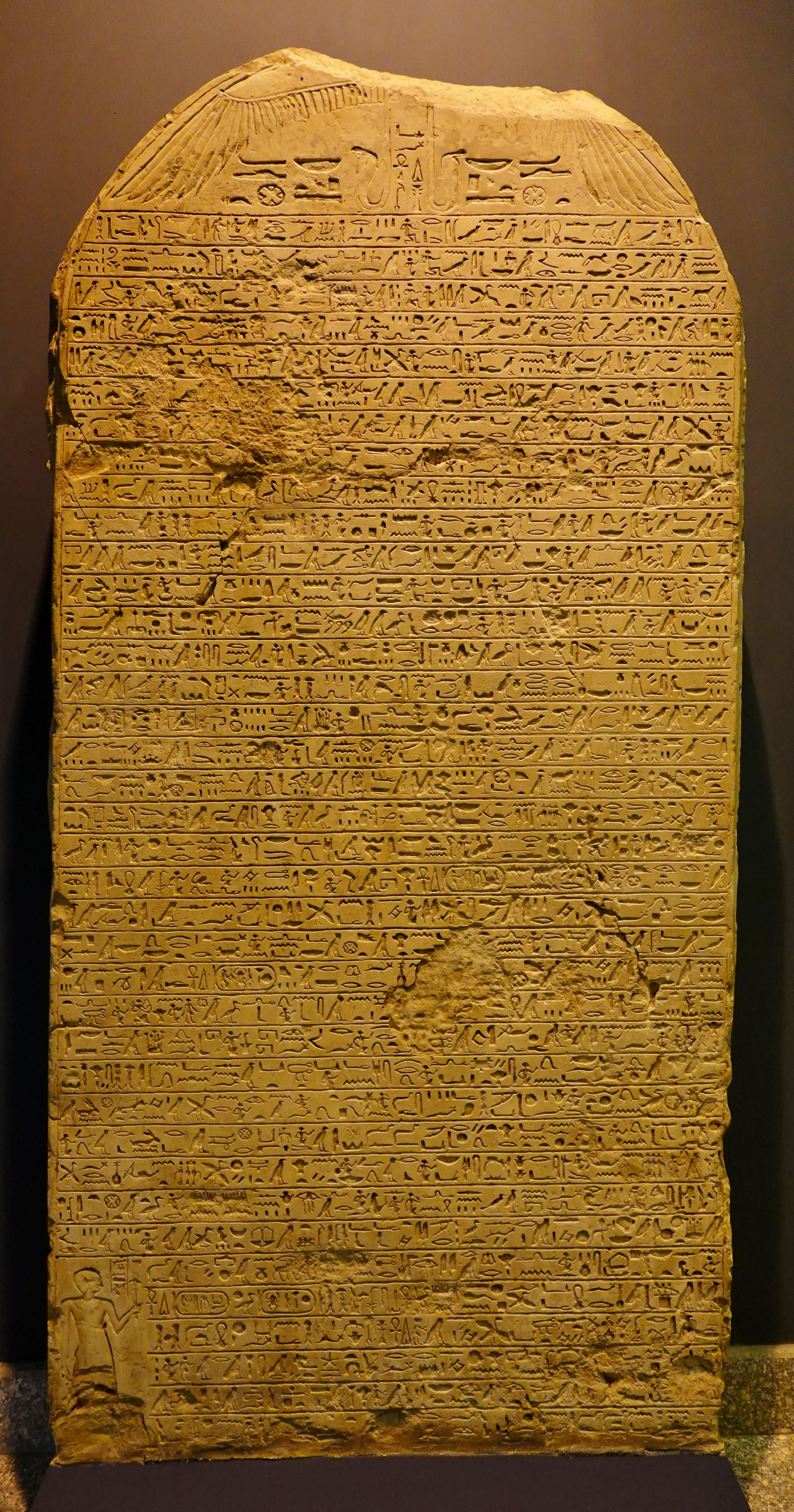
Kamose's second stela which records his victory against the Hyksos (Luxor Museum).

The nationalists in the North had weakened the Hyksos and could no longer muster a counter-attack. In 1559 BC, led by an old enough to fight Ahmose I, they conquered the city of Memphis. Then, with naval support, conquered Hutwaret. They then followed the Hyksos to Sharuhen, a major center of Hyksos power, and laid siege to it for 3 years. After intimidating the surrounding areas, they had won the war. Being in the middle, the people of Thebes and Upper Egypt were had less influence and were politically "independent". They maintained mostly peaceful relationships with the Nubians and Hyksos, restoring unity to Upper and Lower Egypt. Beginning The New Kingdom of Egypt.

== Pharaohs of the 17th Dynasty ==
The Pharaohs of the 17th Dynasty ruled for approximately 30 years. Known rulers of the 17th Dynasty are as follows:

Dynasty XVII Kings of Egypt
Nomen (personal name)	Prenomen (throne name)	Horus-name	Image	Reign	Burial	Consort(s)	Comments
Rahotep	Sekhemre-wahkhaw	Wahankh		c. 1585 BC	Dra' Abu el-Naga'?		
Sobekemsaf I	Sekhemre-wadjkhaw	Hetepnetjeru		7 years	Dra' Abu el-Naga'?	Nubemhat	
Sobekemsaf II	Sekhemre-shedtawy	(unknown)	Statuette Sobekemsaf Petrie b		Dra' Abu el-Naga'? Tomb was robbed during the reign of Ramesses IX	Nubkhaes	
Intef V	Sekhemre-wepmaat	Wepmaat	Louvre 122006 050	2-3? years	Dra' Abu el-Naga'?		
Intef VI	Nubkheperre	Neferkheperu		3-8? years	Dra' Abu el-Naga'	Sobekemsaf	
Intef VII	Sekhemre-heruhermaat	(unknown)			Dra' Abu el-Naga'?	Haankhes	
Ahmose the Elder	Senakhtenre	Merymaat	Relief Senakhtenre by Khruner	1–2 years	Dra' Abu el-Naga'?	Tetisheri	
Tao	Seqenenre	Khaemwaset		c. 1560 (4 years)	Dra' Abu el-Naga'?	Ahmose Inhapy; Sitdjehuti; Ahhotep I	Died in battle against the Hyksos
Kamose	Wadjkheperre	Khahernesetef	Sarcophage-Kamose	1555 to 1550 BC (5 years)	Dra' Abu el-Naga'	Ahhotep II?	

Finally, king Nebmaatre may have been a ruler of the early 17th Dynasty.

== Family tree ==
Sobekemsaf I	Nubemhat
Sobekemsaf II	Nubkhaes II
Sekhemre-Wepmaat Intef	Nubkheperre Intef	Sobekemsaf
Sekhemre-Heruhirmaat Intef

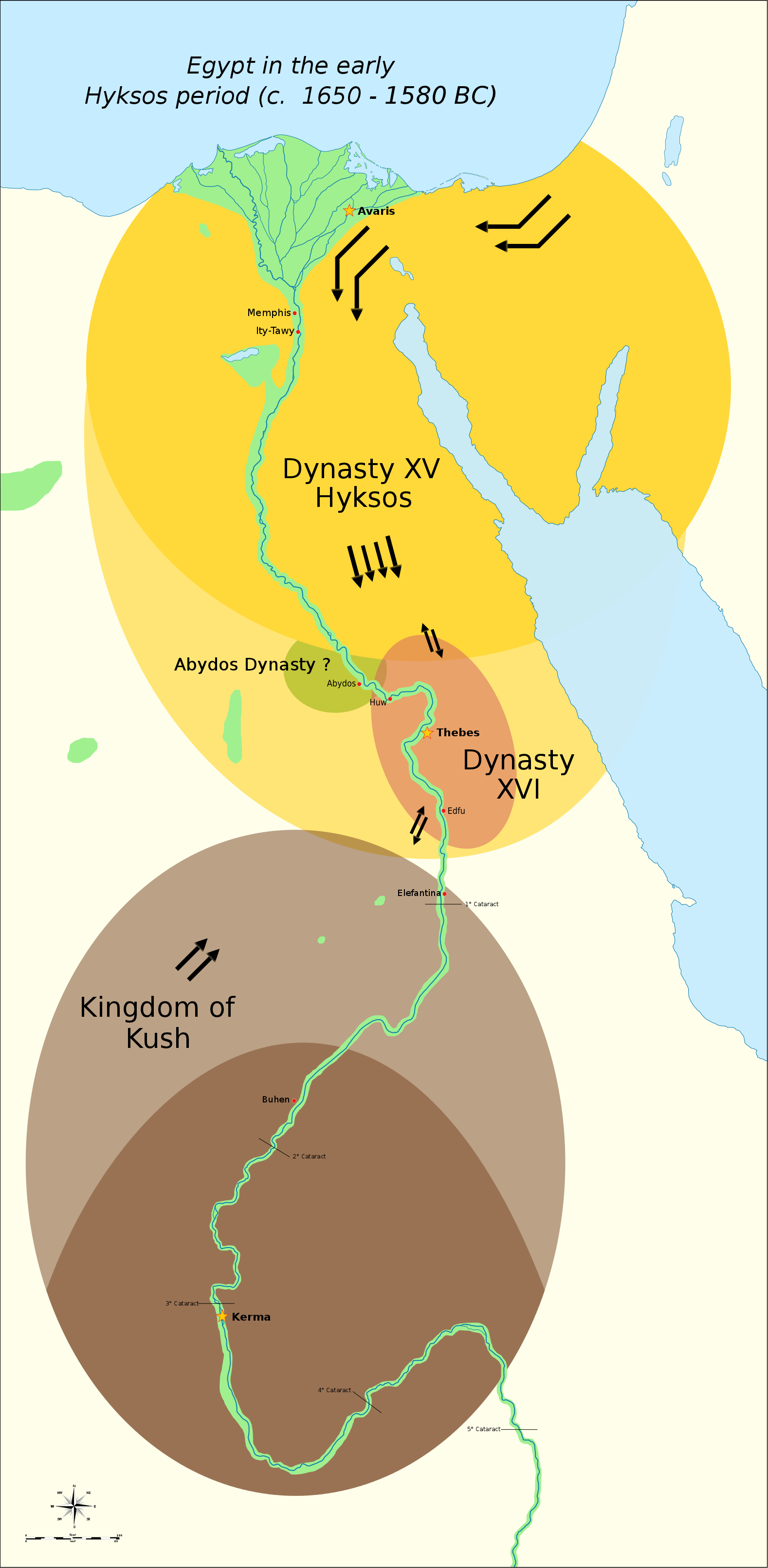
The political situation in the Second Intermediate Period of Egypt (c. 1650 – c. 1550 BC)

== Comparison of regnal lists ==
This dynasty does not appear often on surviving Egyptian king lists, however five kings are recorded on the Karnak King List, dated to the reign of Thutmose III. Three kings are also listed in the kings scene of TT2, dated to the reign of Ramesses II, and on the Table of Qenherkhopshef, dated to the reign of Merneptah. More names may have originally appeared in the missing sections of the kings lists.

Historical Pharaoh	Karnak King List	TT2	Table of Qenherkhopshef
Rahotep	(Sekhem)re Wahkhaure		
Sobekemsaf I	Sekhemre Wadjkhau		
Intef VI	Nubkheperre		
Senakhtenre Ahmose	Senakhtenre	Sekhentnebre	Senakhtenre
Seqenenre Tao	Seqenenre	Seqenenre	Seqenenre
Kamose		Wadjkheperre	Wadjkheperre

The dynasty likely appeared on the Turin King List but the section containing the dynasty is heavily fragmented and very little survives. There were originally sixteen kings named after the Sixteenth Dynasty, but it is unknown if all of these kings were indeed part of the seventeenth dynasty, and one of the two first kings may have been Senebkay, who may have been part of a completely different dynasty.

Turin King List
User..ra ...	Possibly Senebkay.
User...	Possibly Senebkay.
Eight missing names	–
...hebra ...	–
Missing name	–
Missing name	Reigned for 2 years.
Missing name	Reigned for 4 years.
Missing name	Reigned for 3 years.
...nra ...	Reigned for 3 years.

== See also ==
- List of pharaohs

Preceded by 16th Dynasty	Dynasty of Egypt; 1585−1550 BC	Succeeded by 18th Dynasty
