= Sahak-e Abd ol Nabi =

Sahak-e Abd ol Nabi سحاك عبدالنبي
- Village
- Location within Iran
- Coordinates: 31°49′51″N 48°40′40″E
- Country: Iran
- Province: Khuzestan
- County: Shushtar
- Bakhsh: Shadravan
- Rural District: Shoaybiyeh-ye Gharbi

Population (2006)
  - Total: 271
- Time zone: UTC+3:30 (IRST)
  - Summer (DST): UTC+4:30 (IRDT)

Sahak-e Abd ol Nabi (Persian: سحاك عبدالنبي, also Romanized as Saḩāk-e ‘Abd ol Nabī and Sahāk-e ‘Abd ol Nabī; also known as Shahrak-e Sho‘eyb Nabī-ye Qadīm) is a village in Shoaybiyeh-ye Gharbi Rural District, Shadravan District, Shushtar County, Khuzestan Province, Iran. At the 2006 census, its population was 271, in 48 families.
