= Sekhemre-Wepmaat Intef =

Egyptian pharaoh (1600–1600)

Sekhemre-Wepmaat Intef-Aa
- Intef V
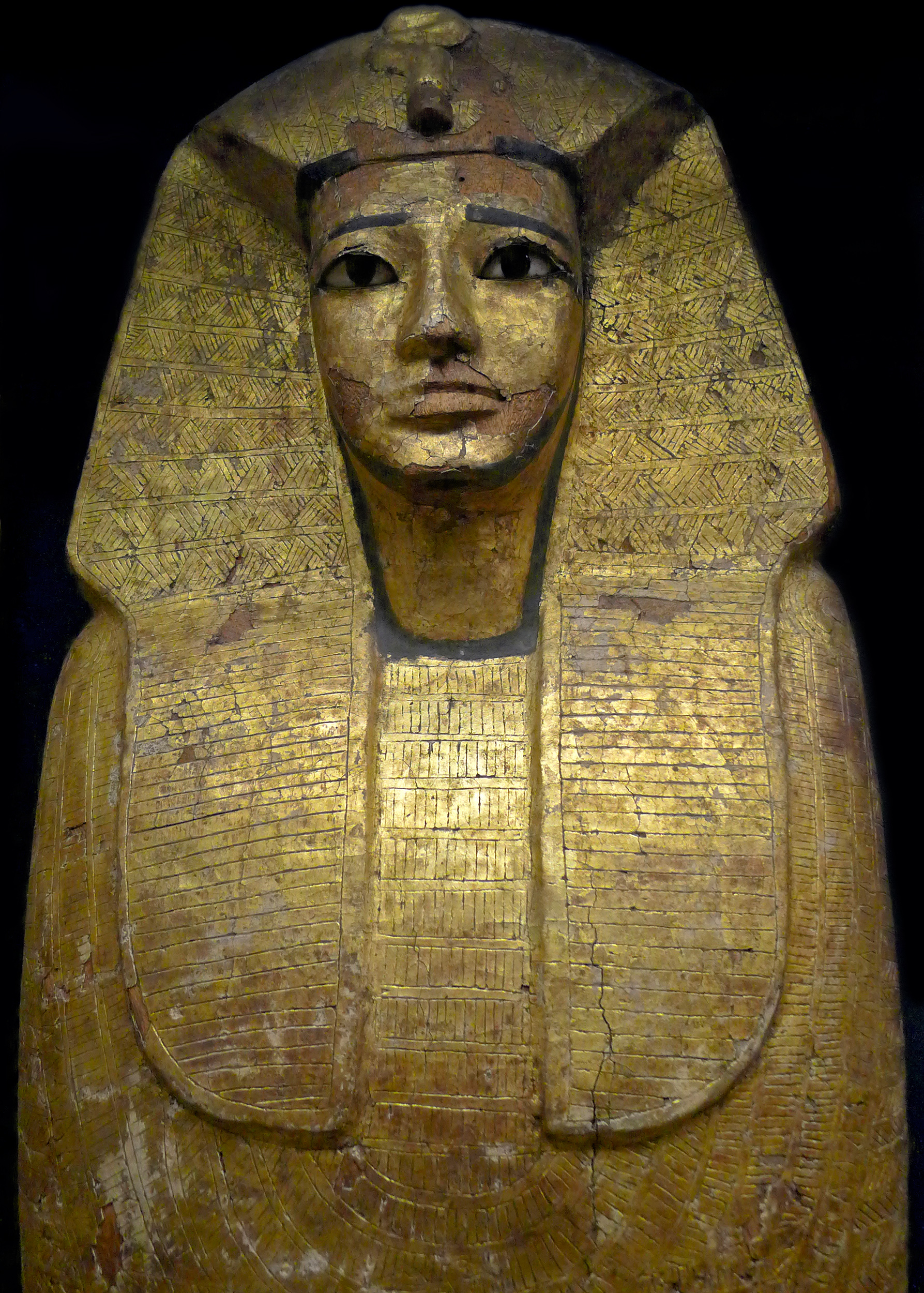
- Sarcophagus of Sekhemre-Wepmaat Intef, Louvre Museum

Pharaoh
- Reign: c.1573?–1571 BC
- Predecessor: Sobekemsaf II?
- Successor: Nubkheperre Intef
Royal titulary
Horus name
Wep-maat
Wp-m3ˁt
He who judges righteously
G5	F13 p Z10 U4 D36 t
Prenomen
Sekhemre-Wepmaat
Sḫm-Rˁ-wp-m3ˁt
Mighty like Re, he who judges righteously

M23 X1 L2 X1	N5 Y8 F13 p Z10 U4 D36 t
Nomen
Intef Aa
Jnj jt=f ˁ3
His father brought him, the great

G39 N5	W25 n&t&f O29V
- Father: Sobekemsaf II
- Burial: Pyramid at Dra' Abu el-Naga'
- Dynasty: 17th Dynasty of Egypt

Sekhemre-Wepmaat Intef-Aa (sometimes Intef V) was an Ancient Egyptian pharaoh of the 17th Dynasty of Egypt, who lived late during the Second Intermediate Period, when Egypt was divided in two by Hyksos-controlled Lower Egypt and Theban-ruled Upper Egypt.

== Biography ==
Sekhemre-Wepmaat Intef is sometimes referred to as Intef V, and sometimes as Intef VI. His nomen, Intef-Aa, translates as "His father brought him, the great" or "Intef, the great." His name may also render as Inyotef-aa.

He ruled from Thebes and was probably buried in a tomb in the necropolis of Dra' Abu el-Naga'.

=== Family ===
It is assumed that Sekhemre-Wepmaat Intef-aa and Nubkheperre Intef were brothers, due to the inscription of Nubkheperre on the coffin of Intef-aa. Furthermore, it is assumed that Nubkheperre, and also Intef-aa, were sons of a king called Sobekemsaf, based on an inscription from a doorjamb from a 17th Dynasty temple at Gebel Antef. Two kings named Sobekemsaf are known, Sobekemsaf I and Sobekemsaf II, and it is believed that the doorjamb refers to Sekhemre Shedtawy Sobekemsaf (Sobekemsaf II).

His mother [...] held the title string King's Mother (mwt-nsw); King's Wife Senior/Great (ḥmt-nsw wrt); ẖnmt nfr ḥḏt (United with the White Crown). This seems to confirm that Intef-aa was the son of a king and born to the king's primary wife.

== Attestations ==
A few attestations are known, see list Ryholt 1997:393 File 17/3.

- BM EA 478 | At Dra Abu el-Naga, a pyramidion.
- Louvre E 3019 | At Dra Abu el-Naga, a sarcophagus.
- Louvre E 2538 (N 491) | At Dra Abu el-Naga, a canopic chest.
- Berlin 6/62 | Unknown provenance, an adze-blade.

=== Non-contemporary attestations ===
- BM EA 10221 "Pap. Abbott" | At Karnak, a document about inspections of pyramid-tombs.

== Burial ==
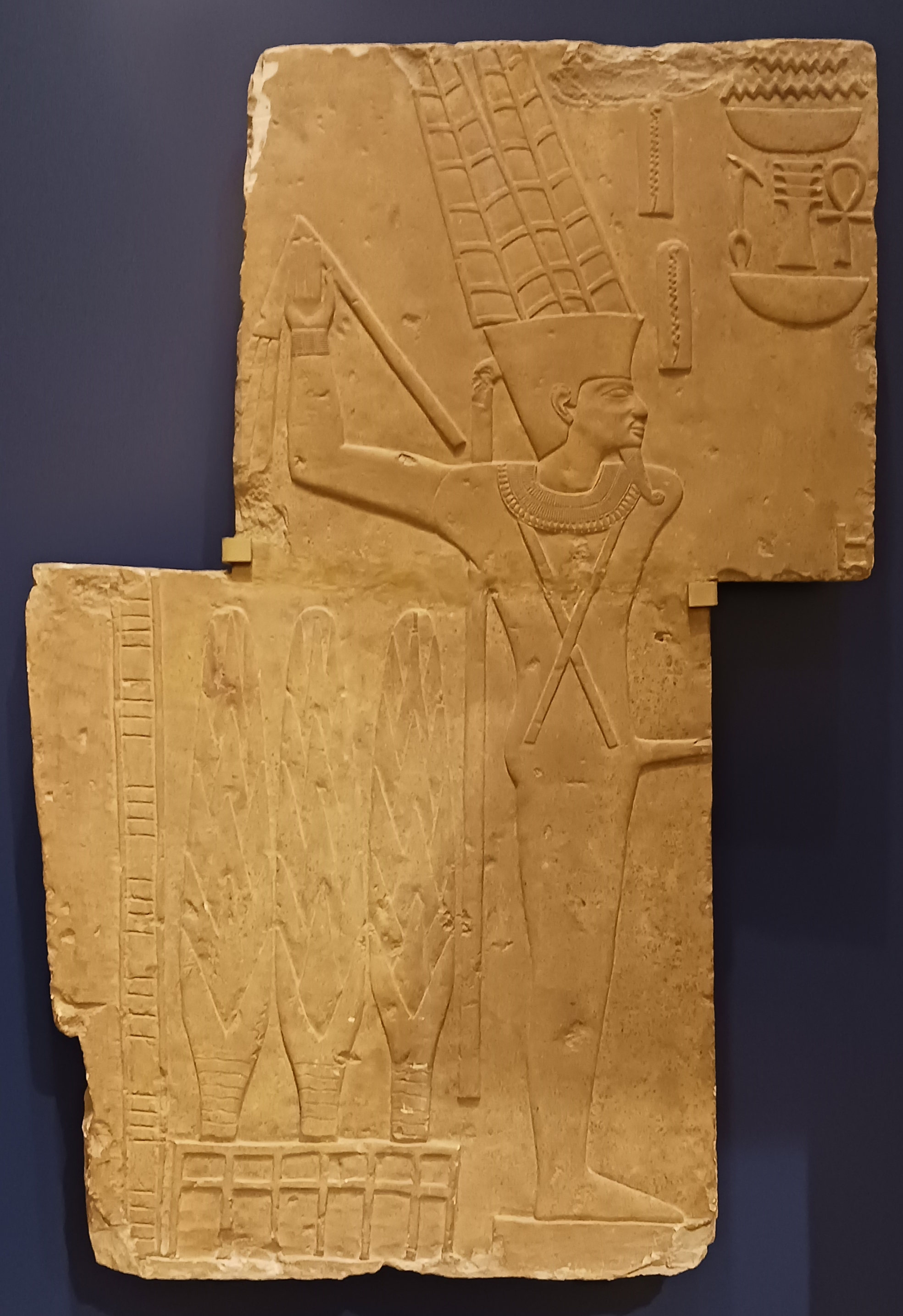
God Min, circa 1630 BCE. Min Temple of Koptos. King Intef V, 17th dynasty. Ashmolean Museum

It is believed he was buried in a pyramid tomb in the 17th Dynasty royal necropolis at Dra' Abu el-Naga' and that his tomb was only found and looted in the late 19th century.

=== Pyramid ===
Sekhemre-Wepmaat Intef's pyramidion was found at Dra Abu el-Naga inscribed with the king's name and had a slope of 60 degrees. The pyramidion is now in the British Museum (BM EA 478). The pyramid tomb of his brother Nubkheperre Intef was found in 2001. During excavations of Nubkheperre Intef's pyramid tomb in 2003, a fragment belonging to Sekhemre-Wepmaat Intef's pyramidion was found alongside fragments of Nubkheperre Intef's own pyramidion. This suggests that the lost pyramid tomb of Sekhemre-Wepmaat Intef is located somewhere in the vicinity of the pyramid of his brother Nubkheperre Intef in Dra' Abu el-Naga'.

=== Coffin and burial equipment ===
The coffin of Sekhemre-Wepmaat Intef-aa (Louvre E 3019) was a rishi coffin discovered in the 19th century by inhabitants of Kurna. The coffin preserved an inscription which reveals that this king's brother Nubkheperre Intef buried – and thus succeeded – him. Sekhemre-Wepmaat Intef-aa's canopic chest was also found. The Priesse Papyrus was found inside the rishi coffin.

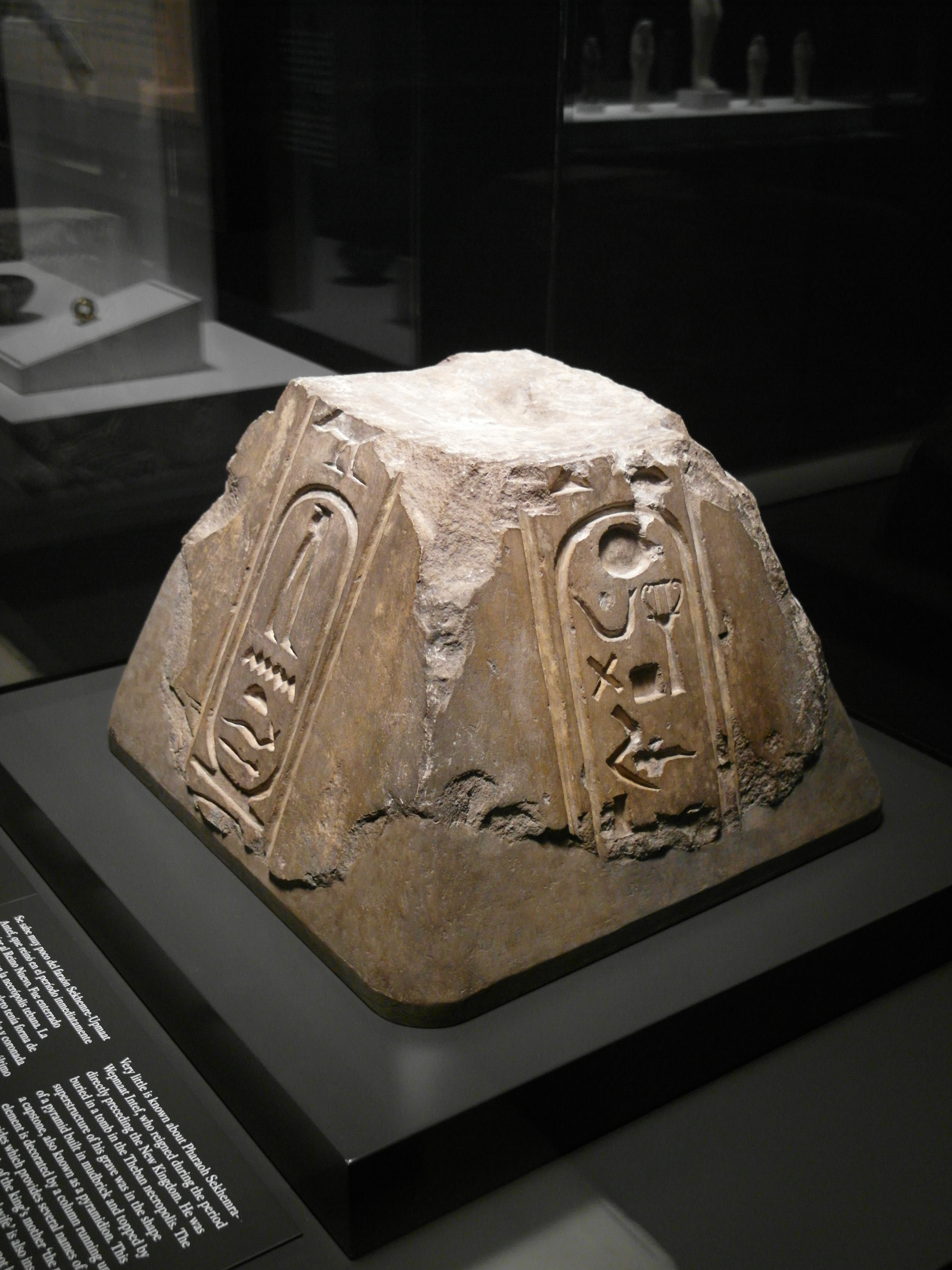
Pyramidion of Sekhemre-Wepmaat Intef, British Museum

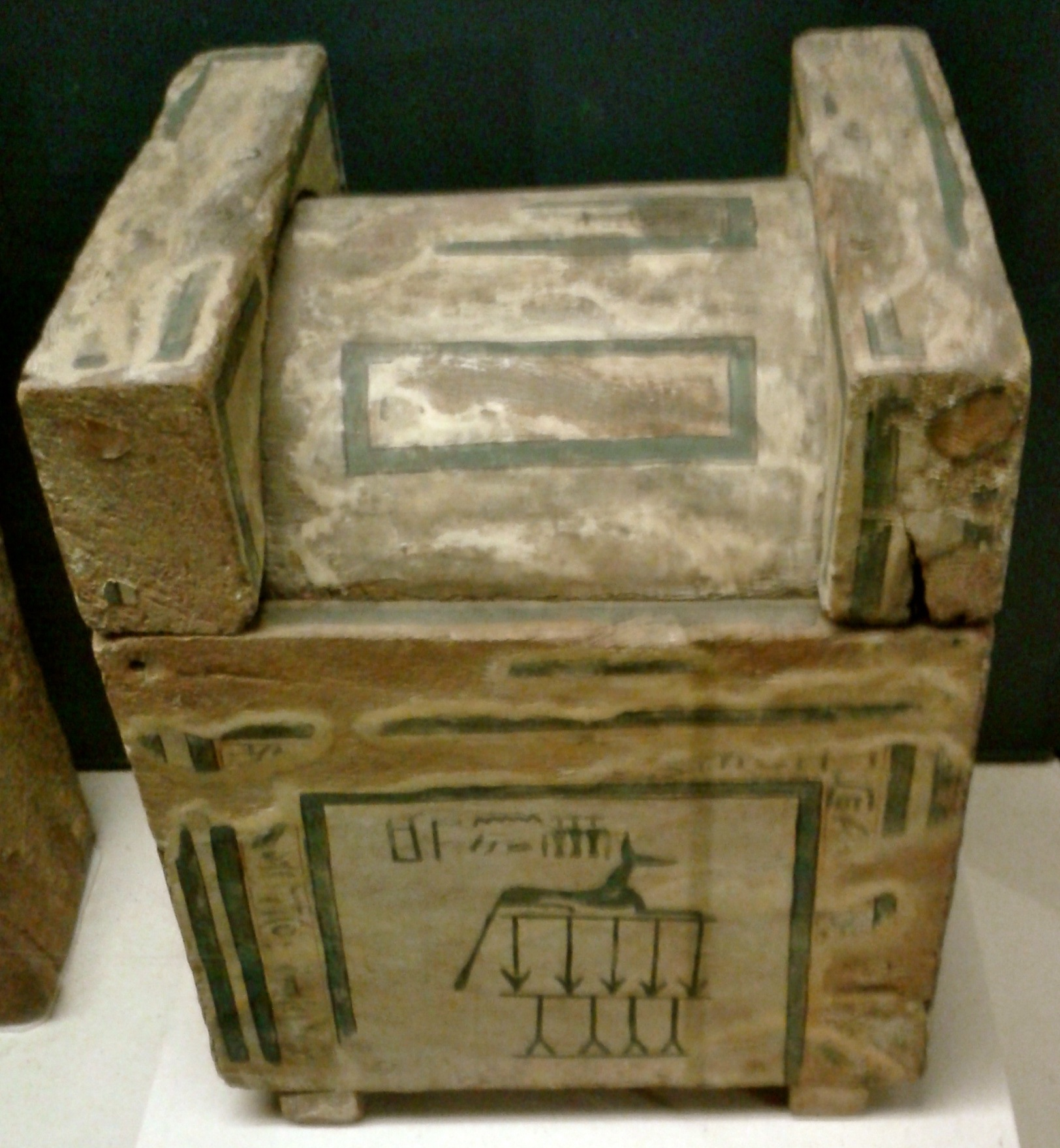
Canopic chest of Sekhemre-Wepmaat Intef, Musée du Louvre.

Preceded by Sobekemsaf II	Pharaoh of Egypt; Seventeenth Dynasty	Succeeded by Nubkheperre Intef
