= Daniel Polz =

German Egyptologist (1957–2025)

Daniel Polz (5 October 1957 – 27 October 2025) was a German Egyptologist.

== Biography ==
Daniel Polz was born on 5 October 1957 in Hamburg.

Polz studied Egyptology, Prehistory, and Theoretical Linguistics at Heidelberg University from 1978 to 1988. During these years, he participated in excavations at Rheinzabern, Rothenburg ob der Tauber, Merimde-Beni Salâme, Thebes (Theban tombs TT296, TT41, TT373, TT54, and TT36), and Dahshur. In 1988, he wrote his doctoral thesis on tomb TT54 in Thebes, entitled "Das Grab Nr. 54 in Theben - Ein Beitrag zur Archäologie thebanischer Felsgräber" (Foreign Citation|language=de|Das Grab Nr. 54 in Theben - Ein Beitrag zur Archäologie thebanischer Felsgräber) at the Institute of Egyptology of Heidelberg University, where he also studied Pre- and Early History, Linguistics, and Classical Archaeology. Polz then became a lecturer in the Special Department of Egyptology, Archaeology, Prehistory and Protohistory, and Near East at the Heidelberg University Library. In 1989, he joined the German Archaeological Institute (DAI), Cairo branch, as a research fellow and received a DAI travel grant in 1989–1990. He subsequently continued his work as a lecturer in Cairo. From 1991, he managed the Dra' Abu el-Naga company in Western Thebes.

In 1993, Polz moved to the United States and became an assistant professor of Egyptian archaeology and history at the University of California, Los Angeles, where he was an associate professor in 1998. Since 1999, he served as the second director of the German Archaeological Institute in Cairo where he "continued to expand the project in the Theban necropolis. His work yielded substantial results for the period between 1650 and 1550 BCE, while also offering important insights into later phases, including the Ramesside era." In 2006, he earned his habilitation from LMU Munich with a dissertation entitled "Der Beginn des Neuen Reiches. Zur Vorgeschichte einer Zeitenwen." Since then, Polz has been a private lecturer in Munich, alongside his work for the DAI. In 2022, the Islamic scholar Ralph Bodenstein was appointed to succeed him in Cairo.

Polz conducted research on the tombs of Theban officials, private and royal tombs of the Second Intermediate Period of Egypt and the beginning of the New Kingdom, as well as on the social and cultural history of the New Kingdom. His archaeological team also rediscovered the tomb of king Nubkheperre Intef of the 17th Dynasty of Egypt at Dra' Abu el-Naga in 2001. When he retired in 2022 at age 65, the scientific direction of the German Archaeological Institute (DAI) project passed to Ute Rummel.

== Death ==
According to the German Archaeological Institute's Facebook account, Daniel Polz died after a long and serious illness on 27 October 2025.

== Publications ==
- "The Location of the Tomb of Amenhotep I: A Reconsideration (pp.8-21)" in Valley of the Sun Kings: New Explorations of the Tombs of the Pharaohs, (editor: Richard H. Wilkinson), The University of Arizona Egyptian Expedition, 1995 PDF
- “The Tomb of Hui and Kel. Thebes No. 54” (La tombe de Hui et de Kel. Thèbes n° 54), in Archaeological Publications, No. 74, von Zabern, Mainz, 1997, ISBN 3-8053-1856-1.
- The Ramsesnakht Dynasty and the Fall of the New Kingdom: A New Monument in Thebes, SAK 25 (1998), pp. 247–293
- with Anne Seiler, Die Pyramidenanlage des Königs Nub-Cheper-Re Intef in Dra' Abu-el-Naga (Le site pyramidal du roi Nub-Cheper-Re Intef à Dra' Abu el-Naga.), German Archaeological Institute, Cairo Department, Special Publication, 24, von Zabern, Mainz, 2003, ISBN 3-8053-3259-9.
- Rediscovered: The Pyramid-Tomb of King Nub-Kheper-Re Intef (pp.17-19) PDF," The Ostracon 13.1 (Spring 2002): pp.17-19
- with Ina Eichner, THE NECROPOLIS OF DRA' ABU EL-NAGAAT THEBES PRELIMINARY REPORT OF THE 14TH SEASON (2004-2005), Annales du service des antiquités de l'Égypte, 80, 2006, pp. 299–310
- Der Beginn des Neuen Reiches. Zur Vorgeschichte einer Zeitenwende/The Beginning of the New Empire: On the Prehistory of a Turning Point, German Archaeological Institute, Cairo Department, Special Publication, 32, de Gruyter, Berlin et al. 2007, ISBN 978-3-11-019347-3 (Also: LMU Munich, Habilitation Thesis, 2006).
- Created for Eternity: The Coffins of Imeni and Geheset (Créé pour l'éternité. Les cercueils d'Imeni et de Geheset), von Zabern, Mainz, 2007, ISBN 978-3-8053-3794-6.
- New Archaeological Data From Dra Abu El-Naga and Their Historical Implications, in Marcel Marée (ed.), The Second Intermediate Period (Thirteenth – Seventeenth Dynasties). Current Research, Future Projects, Orientalia Lovaniensia Analecta 192, Leuven-Paris-Walpole 2010, pp. 343–353
- with Ute Rummel, Ina Eichner & Thomas Beckh, Topographical Archaeology in Dra' Abu el-Naga: Three Thousand Years of Cultural History, Mitteilungen des Deutschen Archäologischen Instituts Abteilung Kairo (MDAIK) 68, 2012, pp.115-134
- The Territorial Claim and the Political Role of the Theban State at the End of the Second Intermediate Period: A Case Study in Irene Forstner-Müller, Nadine Moeller (editors), The Hyksos Ruler Khyan and the Early Second Intermediate Period in Egypt: Problems and Priorities of Current Research. Proceedings of the Workshop of the Austrian Archaeological Institute and the Oriental Institute of the University of Chicago, Vienna, 4–5 July 2014, pp. 217–233
- Artists and Painters in the German House at Thebes, 1905-15 in at Thebes, in Cooke, Neil & Daubney, Vanessa (eds), Every traveller needs a compass. Travel and collecting in Egypt and the Near East, Oxford 2015, pp. 143–153
- with Ute Rummel, Provenance in André J. Veldmeijer, Sailors, musicians and monks. The leatherwork from Draʿ Abu el Naga (Luxor, Egypt), Leiden 2017, pp. 22–35; Online-Veröffentlichung auf Propylaeum-DOK (2023)
- Upper Egypt before the New Kingdom in (eds: Karen Radner, Nadine Moeller and D.T. Potts), "The Oxford history of the Ancient Near East: from the Hyksos to the Late Second Millenium B.C." Volume: III, Oxford University Press, 2022, pp. 48–100
