= Studien zur Altägyptischen Kultur =

- Discipline: Egyptology
- Language: German, English, French
- Edited by: Jochem Kahl and Nicole Kloth

Publication details
- History: 1974-present
- Publisher: Helmut Buske Verlag

Standard abbreviations
- ISO 4: Stud. Altägypt. Kult.

Indexing
- ISSN: 0340-2215

Links
- Journal homepage

Studien zur Altägyptischen Kultur is an annual academic journal containing articles pertaining to the study of Egyptology. It was established in 1974 by Hartwig Altenmueller and Dietrich Wildung, with the aim of creating a communication mechanism for scholars researching ancient Egyptian culture. Articles are mostly written in German but articles written in other languages, principally English and French, are also accepted for publication. The journal is published by Helmut Buske Verlag.

== History ==
The journal was edited by Hartwig Altenmueller and Dietrich Wildung from 1974 to 1993. From 1994 to 2010, the journal was edited by Hartwig Altenmueller and Nicole Kloth. Since 2010 it has been edited by Jochem Kahl (Berlin) and Nicole Kloth (Heidelberg).

== Use of Crocodile Hieroglyph ==
sꜣk "to pull together"

The first volume appeared in 1974, with a set of guidelines appearing under a stylised representation of the s3k crocodile hieroglyph sketched by Wildung. This choice of name and logo was a pun on the ancient Egyptian word sꜣk /ˈsɑːk/, which means "to pull together." In the forward of the first volume, the editors state that the crocodile is not there as a warning to authors, rather signalling the intent of the editors to bring together articles and create a tool for communication in the discipline.
