= Minmose (high priest) =

- High Priest of Anhur
- Predecessor: Hori
- Successor: Anhurmose
- Dynasty: 19th Dynasty
- Pharaoh: Ramesses II
- Father: Hori
- Mother: Inty
- Wife: Buia called Khat-Nisu
- Children: Huneroy (wife of Prehotep II)
- Burial: Abydos

Minmose was the High Priest of Anhur during the reign of Ramesses II.

== Family ==
Minmose was the son of the high Priest of Anhur Hori and his wife Inty. Minmose was well connected. He was the brother-in-law to the Northern Vizier Prehotep I. Minmose was married to Buia called Khat-Nisu. Their daughter Huneroy was married to the Vizier Prehotep II.

== Career ==
Minmose succeeded his father Hori as the Chamberlain of Shu and Tefnut, and High Priest of Anhur. The center of worship was at Thinis. The position of High Priest had been held by Nebwenenef. When Nebwenenef was appointed High Priest of Amun, the priesthood of Anhur was given to Minmose's father Hori.

== Monuments ==
- Granite statue with sistrum (Cairo CGC 1203) The text identifies Minmose as the High Priest of Anhur and the son of Hori and Inty,
- Statuette, Brighton Art Gallery and Museum
- Black granite table of offerings from Mesheikh (Cairo CGC 23095) The inscriptions mention Minmose's wife and parents.
- Tomb chapel at Abydos
- Shabti figures of Minmose from Abydos The texts mention Minmose's wife Khat-Nisu and an (unnamed) son who serves as Second Priest of Anhur.
- Basalt statuette from Abydos (two fragments) Inscribed for the High Priest of Anhur Minmose.
- Votive pot for the Vizier Prehotep
- Pot fragments from offerings in the "Tomb of Osiris" Minmose is referred to as High Priest of Anhur and as Prophet of Maat. The text mentions his father Hori.
- Granite block statue from Mesheikh (Cairo CGC 548) Minmose has the title Fanbearer. The front of the statue shows a lioness-headed goddess.
