= Gegi =

Ancient Egyptian nomarch

- Nomarch of the 8th nome of Upper Egypt
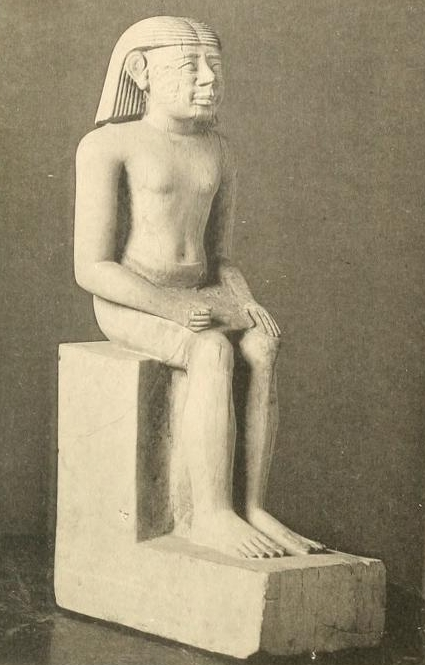
- Statuette depicting Gegi. Cairo Museum, CG72.
Egyptian name
W11 W11 i
- Dynasty: 6th dynasty

Gegi (fl. c. 2300 BC) was an Ancient Egyptian high official who lived at the end of the Old Kingdom in the 6th Dynasty, although it is not possible to provide an exact date. Gegi is known from his false door and six statues. They were found at Saqqara and entered the Egyptian Museum in 1884 where they are still housed. They must come from his tomb. The exact findspot of his burial is unknown. On his monuments, Gegi bears different titles, the most important being overlord of the Thinite nome (Ta-wer). He was therefore nomarch of the province. Gegi was also overseer of priests of Onuris. The latter god was the main deity at Thinis.
