= Nakhtmin (troop commander) =

- Burial place: TT282
- Spouse: Tanedjemet
- Children: Anhurnakht (Troop Commander)
- Relatives: Pennesuttawy (father), Maia (mother)
- Military career
- Allegiance: 19th Dynasty of Egypt (Ramesses II)
- Rank: Troop Commander of Kush, Royal Envoy to Every Foreign Land

Nakhtmin (also called Minnakht) was a Troop Commander of Kush and Royal Envoy to Every Foreign Land during the reign of Ramesses II.

== Family ==
Nakhtmin's parents were the Troop Commander Pennesuttawy and Maia. His father's family is extensively recorded. Pennetsuttawy's parents were Minhotep and Maia. Nakhtmin's uncles were the High Priest of Amun Parennefer and the High Priest of Min and Isis named Minmose.

== Attestations ==
- Theban Tomb TT282 A faience knob in the tomb of his son Anhernakht mentions the Troop Commander Nakhtmin.
- Graffito at Aswan shows the Fanbearer on the King's Right Hand, the Royal Envoy to every foreign country and Troop Commander Nakhtmin.
- Graffito at Bigeh mentions Nakhtmin and identifies him as the son of Pennesuttawy. The inscription is a prayer to Khnum for the Ka of Nakhtmin.
- Nakhtmin is mentioned in the tomb of his father Pennesuttawy (TT156).
