= Hori (high priest) =

Hori was a High Priest of Anhur during the reign of Ramesses II. He was the son of the High Priest of Amun Parennefer called Wennefer and his wife Isis. He may be identical to the High Priest of Amun mentioned on the statue of the Overseer of the Charioteers named Kanakht.

== Family ==
Hori comes from a very well connected family documented on a family monument of his brother Amenemone (Naples Museum 1069). The monument records members of an extended family including Hori, his father Wennenefer and his grandparents Minhotep and Maia.

Uncles of Hori include Pennesuttawy, who was a Troop Commander in Kush and Minmose, who served as the high priest of Min and Isis. The Viceroy of Nubia Paser II was also a relative.

The monument also mentions two brothers of Hori. Amenemone is said to have been a childhood friend of Ramesses II and later was the Chief of Works. Hori is said to be Amenemone's elder brother. A brother named Amenemope served as the Chief of Seers (high priest of Ra in Heliopolis). Amenemope was also a chamberlain of the Lord of the Two Lands. Another brother Khaemwaset was a scribe of the sacred books in the House of Amun.

Hori has a son named Minmose who succeeded him as High Priest of Anhur. If the identification of Hori as the High Priest of Amun is correct, then he also had a son Kanakht who served as overseer of the charioteers.

== High Priest of Anhur ==
Hori is named as the High Priest of Anhur on the monument of his brother Amenemone. He likely followed his father in that office when the latter was made High Priest of Amun. Hori is also mentioned as the High priest of Anhur on statues of his son Minmose who was also a High Priest of Anhur.

- Granite statue of Minmose (Cairo CGC 1203). Minmose is said to be the son of the High Priest of Anhur Hori and his wife Inty.
- Statuette (Brighton Art Gallery and Museum). Minmose is said to be the son of the Dignitary and Chamberlain of Shu and Tefnut, the high Priest of Anhur Hori.
- Black Granite Table of Offerings, Mesheikh (Cairo CGC 23095). Minmose is given the title Chamberlain of Shu and Tefnut, and is said to be the son of the high Priest of Anhur Hori and the musicienne Inty.

== High Priest of Amun ==
The existence of a High Priest of Amun named Hori has been known for many years. Earlier theories conjectured that Hori served towards the end of the reign of Ramesses II. The priest thought to have served after the High Priest Nebwenenef was Parennefer called Wennefer. More recent work has shown that Parennefer called Wennefer served as High Priest at the end of the Eighteenth Dynasty after extensive excavations of his tomb in Thebes in 1990-1993.

The monuments of his son - the Commander of the Chariotry Kanakht - shows that the High Priest of Hori served during the Reign of Ramesses II. Hori likely served as High Priest between Nebwenenef and Paser.
