= Boyo Ockinga =

Australian Egyptologist

- Education: University of Auckland; University of Tübingen
- Scientific career
- Fields: Egyptology
- Workplaces: Macquarie University
- Doctoral students: Jana Jones

Boyo Ockinga is an Egyptologist, epigrapher, and philologist of the ancient Egyptian language, who holds the position of associate professor in the department of ancient history at Macquarie University in Sydney, Australia.

== Biography ==
Ockinga graduated from the University of Auckland, New Zealand with a BA and an MA, and the University of Tübingen Germany, with a PhD. Ockinga specialises in the art and language of the New Kingdom of Egypt and has excavated extensively at a variety of locations in Egypt, including El Mashayikh (near Abydos), Awlad Azzaz (near Sohag), Dra Abu el-Naga, and Saqqara.

== Publications ==
- "A Note on 2 Samuel 18:18", Biblische Notizen 31 (1986), pp. 31–34.
- "On the Interpretation of the Kadesh Record", Chronique d'Égyptologie 62 (1987), pp. 38–48.
- Two Ramesside Tombs at Mashayakh I, Australian Centre for Egyptology, 1988. ISBN 0-85668-453-8
- "The Inviolability of Zion: A Pre-Israelite Tradition", Biblische Notizen: Betrage zur exegetischen Diskussion 44 (1988), pp. 54–60.
- Kitchen, K.A. & Ockinga, B., "A Memphite Monument of the Vizier T3 in Sydney", Mitteilungen des Deutschen Archäologischen Instituts Abteilung Kairo 48 (1992), pp. 99–103, pls 20–21.
- A Concise Grammar of Middle Egyptian – An Outline of Middle Egyptian Grammar (Revised and expanded), Phillip von Zabern Verlag, 1998. ISBN 3-8053-2501-0
- A Tomb from the Reign of Tutankhamun at Awlad Azzaz (Akhmim), Warminster: Aris & Phillips, 1998.
- "An Ancient Egyptian Puzzle: Piecing Together the Saqqara Tomb of the Overseer of Craftsmen and Chief Goldworker, Amenemone", Bulletin of the Australian Centre for Egyptology 9 (1998), pp. 73–87.
- "Nag' el-Mashayikh – the Ramesside Tombs", Bulletin of the Australian Centre for Egyptology 1 (1990)
- "The Tomb of Sennedjem at Awlad Azzaz (Sohag)", Bulletin of the Australian Centre for Egyptology 2 (1991)
- "Macquarie University Theban Tombs Project: TT148 Amenemope: Preliminary Report on the 1991/92 and 1992/93 Seasons", Bulletin of the Australian Centre for Egyptology 4 (1993)
- "Another Ramesside Attestation of Usemont, Vizier of Tutankhamun", Bulletin of the Australian Centre for Egyptology 5 (1994)
- "Hatshepsut's Election to Kingship: the Ba and Ka in Egyptian Royal Ideology", Bulletin of the Australian Centre for Egyptology 6 (1995)
- "Macquarie Theban Tombs Project: TT 148 the Tomb of Amenemope", Bulletin of the Australian Centre for Egyptology 7 (1996)
- "An Ancient Egyptian Puzzle: Piecing together the Saqqara Tomb of the Overseer of Craftsmen and Chief Goldworker Amenemone", Bulletin of the Australian Centre for Egyptology 9 (1998)
- "Theban Tomb 233 – Saroy regains an identity", Bulletin of the Australian Centre for Egyptology 11 (2000), pp. 103–113.
- "Excavations at Dra' Abu el-Naga': Report on the Nov–Dec 2000 and Jan–Feb 2002 Seasons", Bulletin of the Australian Centre for Egyptology 13 (2002)
- "TT147 – Observations on its Owners and Erasures", Bulletin of the Australian Centre for Egyptology 15 (2004)
- Boyo Ockinga and Ian Plant, Egyptian Religion – Greek and Latin Sources in Translation, Equinox, 2007. ISBN 1-84553-031-4 (hbk), ISBN 1-84553-032-2 (pbk)
