= IPY =

IPY or Ipy may refer to:

- International Polar Year, year of international research focused on the polar regions
- Ipy (goddess), an ancient Egyptian mother goddess depicted as a hippopotamus
- Ipy (noble), a court official who was part of the 18th Dynasty of Ancient Egypt
