= Maya (High Priest of Amun) =

High Priest of Amun until at least year 4 of Akhenaten

- High Priest of Amun
- Predecessor: Meryptah or Ptahmose (vizier)
- Successor: Parennefer called Wennefer
- Dynasty: 18th Dynasty
- Pharaoh: Amenhotep III, Akhenaten
- Burial: Dra' Abu el-Naga', Thebes (Tomb K99.1)

Maya or May was a High Priest of Amun of ancient Egypt, until at least year 4 of Akhenaten.

== Biography ==
May is known from an expedition in year 4 to Wadi Wadi Hammamat. The purpose of the expedition was to quarry stone for the statue of the king.

regnal year 4, third month of inundation, day 10; under the majesty of the king of Upper and Lower Egypt Nefer-Khepheru-Re Waenre, the son of Re, Amenhotep; (the day) when the First Prophet of Amun, May, was charged with fetching basalt (for) the image of the Lord . . .

Further inscriptions on the way to the quarries, at Wadi Abu Quwei, record that the expedition of the High Priest was accompanied by a contingent of 253 soldiers. the soldiers were under the command of a standard-bearer named Ry and his second in command named Amenmose.

Aldred suggested that Meryptah had succeeded Ptahmose as High Priest of Amun and served towards the end of Amenhotep III's reign. And hence Maya would have been Meryptah's successor. Donald Redford speculates that Maya is short for Ptahmose and that Ptahmose served from the end of the reign of Amenhotep III until the beginning of the time of Akhenaten.

== Death and burial ==
Maya is not mentioned after year 4, and it is possible he died soon after this expedition.

An ostracon with the name and title of the High Priest of Amun May was found by Fisher during the 1921-1923 expeditions in Dra' Abu el-Naga'. It is now in the Penn Museum (Object Number: 29-87-419). The tomb of May was identified in Dra' Abu el-Naga' as being Tomb K99.1 by a German team led by D. Polz. There is a statue of Maya, with placard that reads "Maya, Governor and Chief of the Priests of Lower Egypt, 1400 BC" at the Berlin Egyptian museum. A Chief of Priests of Lower Egypt would be head priest of the two religious centers of "Sais" and "On." https://www.alamy.com/berlin-germany-ancient-egyptian-seated-statue-of-maya-governor-and-chief-of-the-priests-wearing-the-gold-of-honour-neues-museum-new-kingdom-pe-image241818317.html
