= The Seventh Gate =

The Seventh Gate may refer to:

- The Seventh Gate (Weis and Hickman novel), a 1994 novel by Margaret Weis and Tracy Hickman
- The Seventh Gate (Harris novel), a 1983 novel by Geraldine Harris
