= Thinis =

Thinis Tjenu
- Lost city
- Approximate location (at Girga) in modern Egypt
- Coordinates: 26°20′N 31°54′E
- Country: Ancient Egypt
- Nome: Nome VIII of Upper Egypt
- earliest evidence: c. 4000 BC

Government
  - Type: Nomarch (Old Kingdom); Mayor (New Kingdom)

Thinis (Greek: Θίνις Thinis, Θίς This (Note: Greek is a reconstruction from adjectivial forms) ; Egyptian: Tjenu; Coptic: Ⲧⲓⲛ; Arabic: طين) was the capital city of pre-unification Upper Egypt. Thinis remains undiscovered but is well attested by ancient writers, including the classical historian Manetho, who cites it as the centre of the Thinite Confederacy, a tribal confederation whose leader, Menes (or Narmer), united Egypt and was its first pharaoh. Thinis began a steep decline in importance when the capital was relocated to Memphis, which was thought to be the first true and stable capital after the unification of Egypt by Menes. Thinis's location on the border of the competing Heracleopolitan and Theban dynasties of the First Intermediate Period and its proximity to certain oases of possible military importance ensured Thinis some continued significance in the Old and New Kingdoms. This was a brief respite and Thinis eventually lost its position as a regional administrative centre by the Roman period.

Due to its ancient heritage, Thinis remained a significant religious centre, housing the tomb and mummy of the regional deity. In ancient Egyptian religious cosmology, as seen (for example) in the Book of the Dead, Thinis played a role as a mythical place in heaven.

Although the precise location of Thinis is unknown, mainstream Egyptological consensus places it in the vicinity of ancient Abydos and modern Girga.

== Name and location ==
t n y T14 niwt or T n niwt
tni or ṯn
in hieroglyphs

The name Thinis (Θίνις) is derived from Manetho's use of the adjective Thinite to describe the pharaoh Menes. Although the corresponding Thinis does not appear in Greek, it is demanded by the Egyptian original and is the more popular name among Egyptologists. Also suggested is This (Θίς).

In correcting a passage of Hellanicus (b. 490 BCE), Jörgen Zoega amended Τίνδων ὄνομα to Θὶν δὲ ᾧ ὄνομα. Maspero (1903) found that this revealed the name Thinis and also, from the same passage, a key geographic indicator: επιποταμίη (English: on the river). Maspero used this additional detail to support the theory, which included among its followers Jean-François Champollion and Nestor L'Hôte, locating Thinis at modern-day Girga or a neighbouring town, possibly El-Birba. Other proposals for Thinis' location have lost favour at the expense of the Girga-Birba theory: Auguste Mariette, founder director of the Egyptian Museum, suggested Kom el-Sultan; A. Schmidt, El-Kherbeh; and Heinrich Karl Brugsch, Johannes Dümichen and others supported El-Tineh, near Berdis. Mainstream Egyptological consensus continues to locate Thinis at or near to either Girga, or El-Birba (where an inscribed statue fragment mentioning Thinis is said to have been found).

== History ==
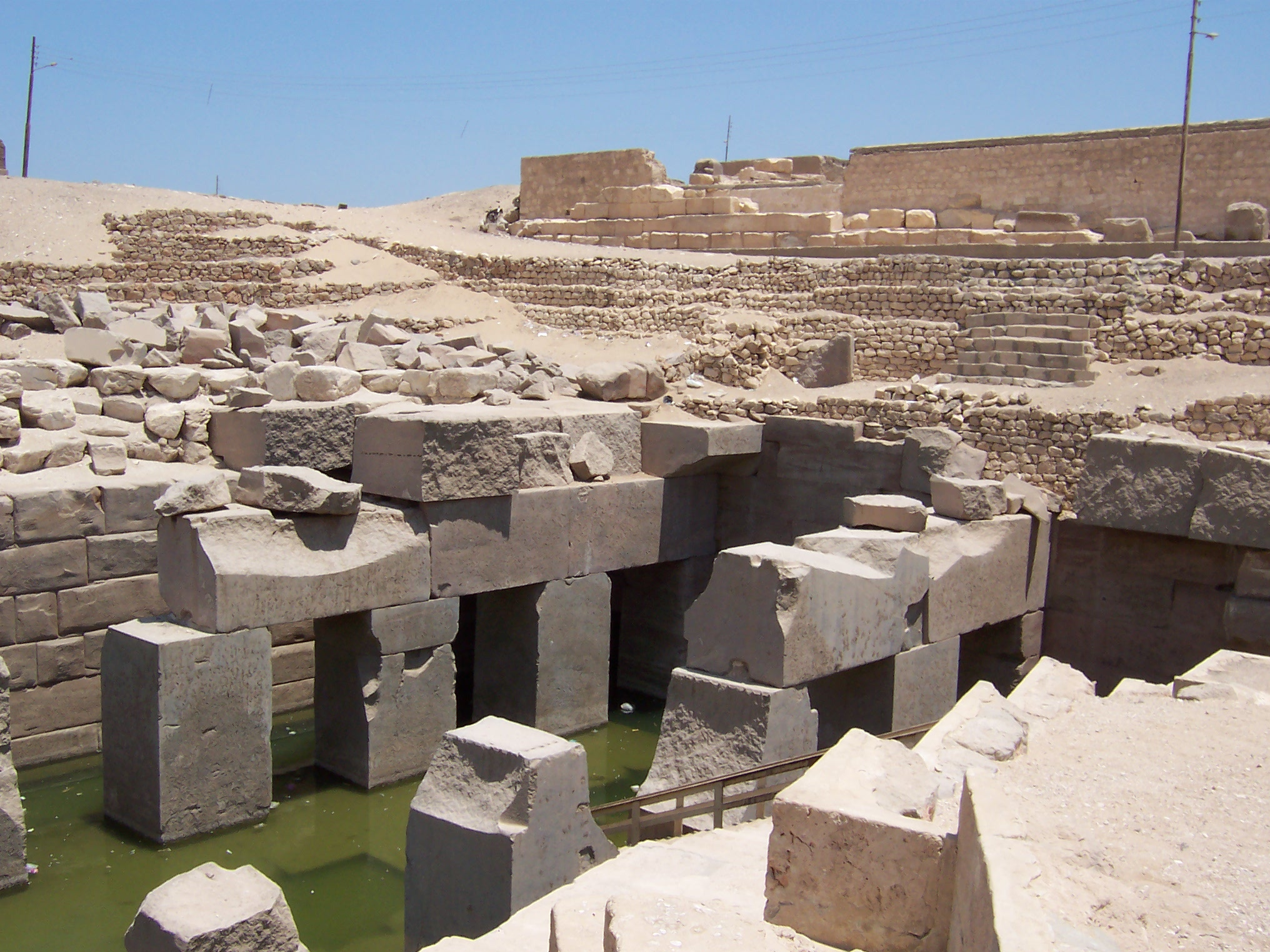
Nearby Abydos (Osireion pictured), after ceding its political rank to Thinis, remained an important religious centre.

=== Pre-dynastic period ===
Although the archaeological site of Thinis has never been located, evidence of population concentration in the Abydos-Thinis region dates from the fourth millennium BCE. Thinis is also cited as the earliest royal burial-site in Egypt.

At an early point, the city of Abydos ceded its political rank to Thinis, and although Abydos would continue to enjoy supreme religious importance, its history and functions cannot be understood without reference to Thinis. The role of Thinis as centre of the Thinite Confederacy is taken from Manetho, although there are still Dynasty I and late Dynasty II royal tombs at Abydos, the principal regional necropolis.

=== Early Dynastic and Old Kingdom to Second Intermediate Period ===
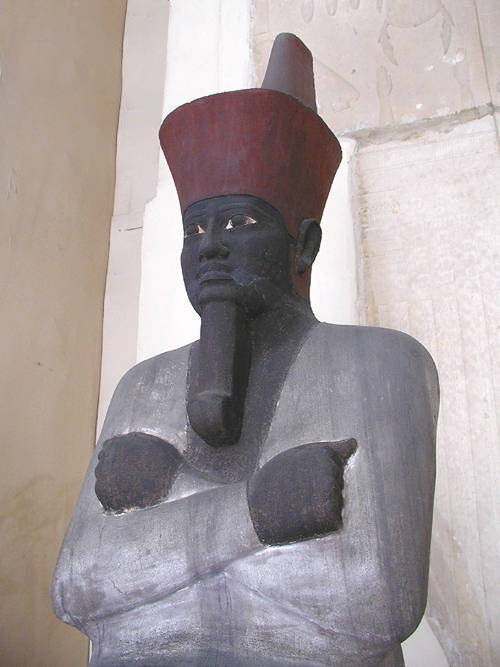
Mentuhotep II, pharaoh of the Theban Dynasty XI, finally brought Thinis under Theban sway during his campaign of reunification.

Such importance seems to have been short-lived: certainly, the national political role of Thinis ended shortly after the unification of Egypt when Memphis became the chief religious and political centre. Nonetheless, Thinis retained its regional significance: during Dynasty V it was the probable seat of the "Overseer of Upper Egypt", an administrative official with responsibility for the Nile Valley south of the Delta, and throughout antiquity it was the eponymous capital of nome VIII of Upper Egypt and seat of its nomarch.

During the wars of the First Intermediate Period (c. 2181 – c. 2055 BCE), Ankhtifi, nomarch of Hierakonpolis, demanded recognition of his suzerainty from the "overseer of Upper Egypt" at Thinis, and although the city walls, cited in Ankhtifi's autobiography, seem to have left Ankhtifi capable of only a show of force, he appears to have purchased Thinis' neutrality with grain.

Following Ankhtifi's death, Thinis was the northernmost nome to fall under the sway of Intef II, pharaoh of the Theban Dynasty XI (c. 2118 – c. 2069 BCE). Progress north by the Theban armies was halted by Kheti III, pharaoh of the Heracleopolitan Dynasty IX, in a battle at Thinis itself that is recorded in the Teaching for King Merykara, and, throughout Intef II's later years, his war against the Heracleopolitans and their allies, the nomarchs of Assyut, was waged in the land between Thinis and Assyut.

As Thebes began to gain the upper hand, Mentuhotep II (c. 2061 – c. 2010 BCE), during his campaign of reunification, brought Thinis (which had been in revolt, possibly at Heracleopolitan instigation and certainly with the support of an army under the command of the nomarch of Assyut,) firmly under his control.

During the Second Intermediate Period (c. eighteenth century BCE), Thinis may have experienced resurgent autonomy: Ryholt (1997) proposes that the Abydos dynasty of kings might better be called the "Thinite Dynasty" and that, in any event, their royal seat was likely at Thinis, already a nome capital.

=== New Kingdom and Late Period ===
The city's steady decline appears to have halted briefly during Dynasty XVIII (c. 1550 – c. 1292 BCE), when Thinis enjoyed renewed prominence, based on its geographical connection to various oases of possible military importance. Certainly, the office of mayor of Thinis was occupied by several notable New Kingdom figures: Satepihu, who participated in the construction of an obelisk for Hatshepsut and was himself subject of an exemplary block statue; the herald Intef, an indispensable member of the royal household and the travelling-companion of Thutmose III; and Min, tutor to the prince Amenhotep III.

Nonetheless, Thinis had declined to a settlement of little significance by the historic period. The misleading reference on a seventh-century BCE Assyrian stele to "Nespamedu, king of Thinis" is nothing more than a reflection of Assyrian "ignorance of the subtlety of the Egyptian political hierarchy".

Certainly, by the Roman period, Thinis had been supplanted as capital of its nome by Ptolemais, perhaps even as early as that city's foundation by Ptolemy I.

== Religion ==
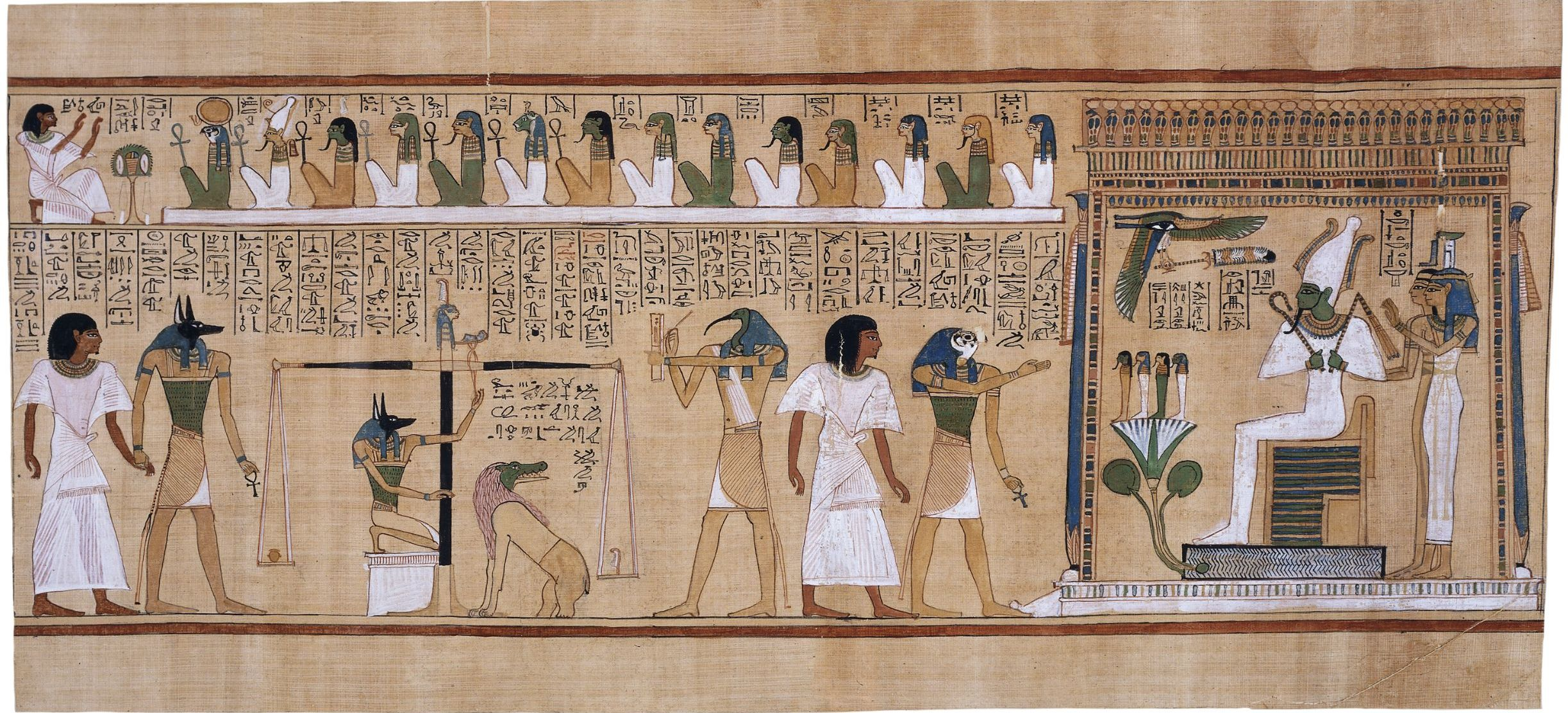
A tableau from the Book of the Dead (green-skinned Osiris is seated to the right). In ancient Egyptian religious cosmology, Thinis features as a mythical place in heaven.

As each nome was home to the tomb and mummy of its dead nome-god, so at Thinis was the temple and last resting-place of Anhur, whose epithets included "bull of Thinis", worshipped after his death as Khenti-Amentiu, and who, as nome-god, was placed at the head of the local ennead.

The high priest of the temple of Anhur at Thinis was called the first prophet, or chief of seers, a title that Maspero (1903) suggests is a reflection of Thinis' decline in status as a city.

One such chief of seers, Anhurmose, who died in the reign of Merneptah (c. 1213 – c. 1203 BCE), broke with the tradition of his New Kingdom predecessors, who were buried at Abydos, and was laid to rest at Thinis itself.

The lion-goddess Mehit was also worshipped at Thinis, and the restoration of her temple there during Merneptah's reign was probably overseen by Anhurmose.

There is evidence that succession to the office of chief of seers of Anhur at Thinis was familial: in the Herakleopolitan period, one Hagi succeeded his elder brother, also called Hagi, and their father to the post; and, in the New Kingdom, Wenennefer was succeeded in the priestly office by his son, Hori.

In ancient Egyptian religious cosmology, Thinis played a role as a mythical place in heaven. In particular, as set out in the Book of the Dead, its eschatological significance can be seen in certain rituals: when the god Osiris triumphs, "joy goeth its round in Thinis", a reference to the celestial Thinis, rather than the earthly city.

== See also ==
- List of ancient Egyptian towns and cities

== Bibliography ==
- Anderson, David A. (1999), "Abydos, Predynastic sites", in Bard, Kathryn A. (ed.), Encyclopedia of the archaeology of ancient Egypt, London: Routledge.
- Bagnall, Roger S. (1996) [1993]. Egypt in late antiquity. Princeton: Princeton University Press. ISBN 978-0-691-01096-0.
- Bard, Kathryn A., ed. (1999), "Old Kingdom, overview", Encyclopedia of the archaeology of ancient Egypt, London: Routledge.
- Brovarski, Edward (1999), "First Intermediate Period, overview", in Bard, Kathryn A. (ed.), Encyclopedia of the archaeology of ancient Egypt, London: Routledge.
- Bryan, Betsy M. (2006), "Administration in the reign of Thutmose III", in Cline, Eric H.; O'Connor, David (eds.), Thutmose III: A new biography, Ann Arbor: The University of Michigan Press.
- Clark, Rosemary (2004) [2000]. The sacred tradition in ancient Egypt: The esoteric wisdom revealed. Saint Paul, Minnesota: Llewellyn Publications. ISBN 1-56718-129-5.
- Fischer, H. G. (1987–1988). "A parental link between two Thinite stelae of the Herakleopolitan period". Bulletin of the Egyptological Seminar. 9: 15–23. Archived from the original on 2012-08-31.
- Frood, Elizabeth (2007). Biographical texts from Ramessid Egypt. Atlanta: Society of Biblical Literature. ISBN 978-1-58983-210-7.
- Gardiner, Sir Alan Henderson (1964) [1961]. Egypt of the pharaohs: An introduction. Oxford: Oxford University Press. ISBN 978-0-19-500267-6.
- Grimal, Nicolas-Christophe (1992). A history of ancient Egypt. Oxford: Blackwell Publishing Ltd.
- Hamblin, William J. (2006). Warfare in the ancient Near East to c. 1600 BC. Abdingdon: Routledge. ISBN 978-0-415-25589-9.
- Kitchen, Kenneth Anderson (2003). Ramesside inscriptions: Translated and annotated. Vol. 4. Oxford: Blackwell Publishing Ltd. ISBN 0-631-18429-5.
- Leahy, A. (1979). "Nespamedu, "king" of Thinis". Göttinger Miszellen. 35. Göttingen: 31–39.
- Lesley, John Peter (1868). Man's origin and destiny sketched from the platform of the sciences. Philadelphia: J. B. Lippincott & Co.
- Maspero, Gaston (1903), "History of Egypt", in Sayce, Archibald Henry (ed.), History of Egypt, Chaldea, Syria, Babylonia, and Assyria, vol. 9, N.p.: Kessinger Publishing
- Massey, Gerald (1907). Ancient Egypt: The light of the world. Vol. 2. London: T. Fisher Unwin. ISBN 9780766126558.
- Moldenke, Charles Edward (2008) [N.d.]. The New York Obelisk, Cleopatra's Needle. N.p.: BiblioBazaar LLC. ISBN 978-0-554-62767-0.
- Parkinson, R. B. (1999) [1997]. The Tale of Sinuhe and other ancient Egyptian poems. Oxford: Oxford University Press. ISBN 0-19-283966-7.
- Patch, Diana Craig (1991). The origin and early development of urbanism in ancient Egypt: A regional study. Philadelphia: University of Pennsylvania. pp. 1–611. Archived from the original on September 21, 2006.
- Pinch, Geraldine (2002). Handbook of Egyptian mythology. Santa Barbara: ABC-CLIO. ISBN 1-57607-242-8.
- Redford, Donald B. (2003). The wars in Syria and Palestine of Thutmose III. Leiden: Brill. ISBN 90-04-12989-8.
- Ryholt, K. S. B. (1997). The political situation in Egypt during the Second Intermediate Period, c. 1800 – 1550 BC. Copenhagen: Museum Tusculanum Press. ISBN 87-7289-421-0.
- Shaw, Ian (2000). The Oxford history of ancient Egypt. Oxford: Oxford University Press.
- Strudwick, Nigel C. (2005). Texts from the pyramid age. Atlanta: Society of Biblical Literature. ISBN 978-1-58983-138-4.
- Tacoma, Laurens E. (2006). Fragile hierarchies: The urban elites of third century Roman Egypt. Leiden: Brill. ISBN 90-04-14831-0.
- Wilkinson, Richard H. (1992). Reading Egyptian art: A hieroglyphic guide to ancient Egyptian painting and sculpture. London: Thames & Hudson.
- Wilkinson, Toby A. H. (2000) [1999]. Early Dynastic Egypt. Abingdon: Routledge. ISBN 0-415-26011-6.
- Verbrugghe, Gerald P.; Wickersham, John M. (2001) [1996]. Berossos and Manetho, introduced and translated: Native traditions in ancient Mesopotamia and Egypt. Ann Arbor: The University of Michigan Press. ISBN 0-472-10722-4.
