= Meryptah =

Egyptian high priest

- High Priest of Amun
- Predecessor: probably Ptahmose
- Successor: probably Maya
- Dynasty: 18th Dynasty
- Pharaoh: Amenhotep III

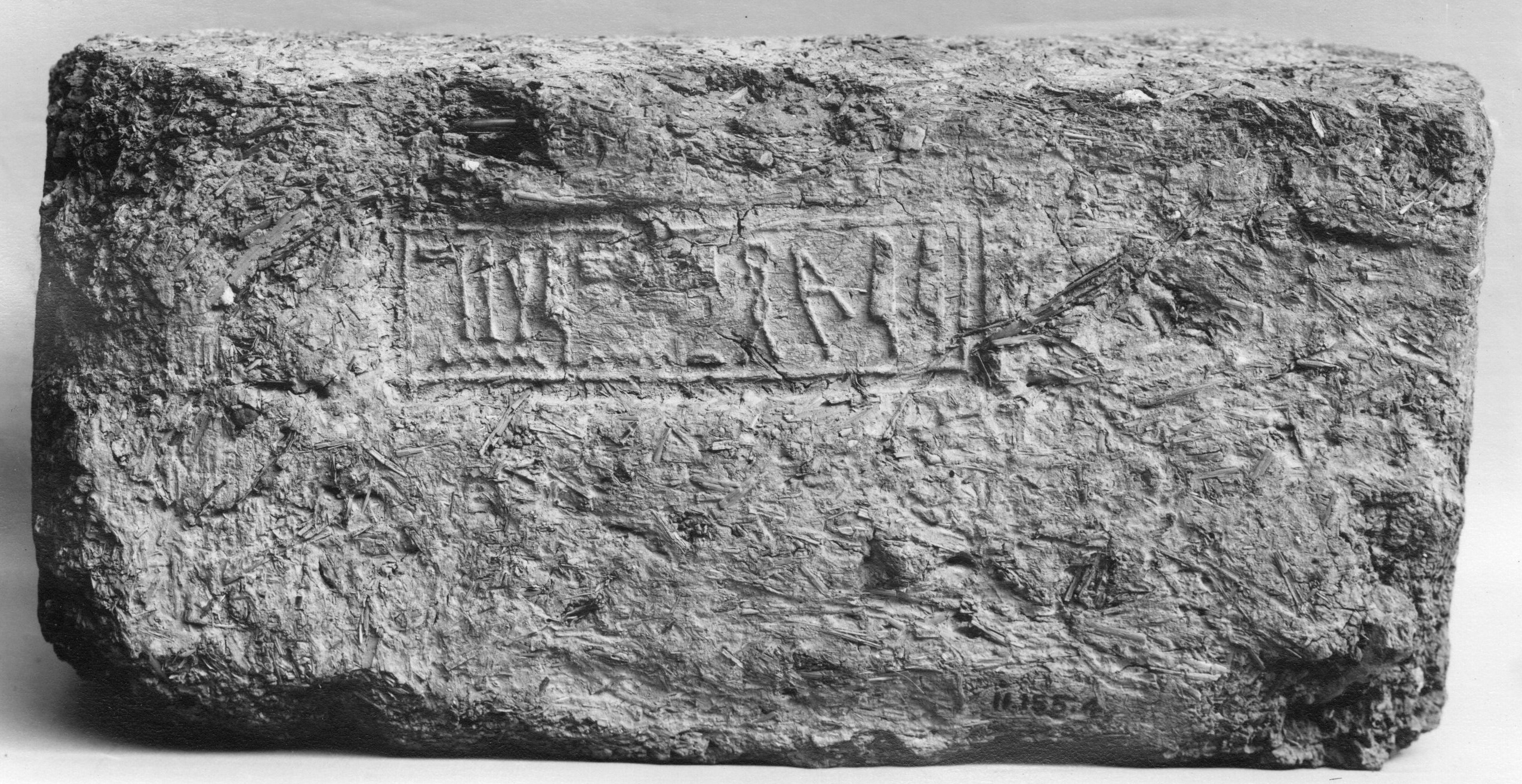
The name Meryptah is stamped into this mud brick (c. 1390–1352 B.C., Thebes)

Meryptah was a High Priest of Amun during the time of Amenhotep III.

He is known from a statue mentioning Meryptah with Anen, Amenemhat and Si-Mut who were a 2nd, 3rd and 4th prophet respectively. Aldred conjectures that Meryptah succeeded Ptahmose and served until the end of the reign of Amenhotep III. Meryptah would have served from ca. year 20 of Amenhotep's reign until the end of that reign.

Meryptah was granted burial in Thebes (Qurna). Some funerary items were recovered from a pit excavated in the early 19th century. Items include:

- A kneeling statue of Meryptah singing a hymn of praise to Ra
- The Oriental Institute in Chicago has a statue of Meryptah
- The Metropolitan Museum possesses three stamped mud bricks inscribed for The First Prophet of Amun Meryptah
- A polished boxwood kohl container-(statuette), girl with youth side lock, carrying oversized pot: The Durham Servant Girl.
