= The Dead Kingdom =

The Dead Kingdom is a novel by Geraldine Harris published in 1983.

== Plot summary ==
The Dead Kingdom is the third novel of the "Seven Citadels" tetralogy.

== Reception ==
Dave Langford reviewed The Dead Kingdom for White Dwarf #62 and stated that "evidently she planned the four books as a whole rather than writing blindly into the unknown or tacking extensions onto a self-contained novel. To all sequelholics I say, go thou and do likewise."

== Reviews ==
- Review by Raymond H. Thompson (1984) in Fantasy Review, August 1984
