= TT282 =

Theban tomb

Theban tomb TT282
- Burial site of Nakhtmin
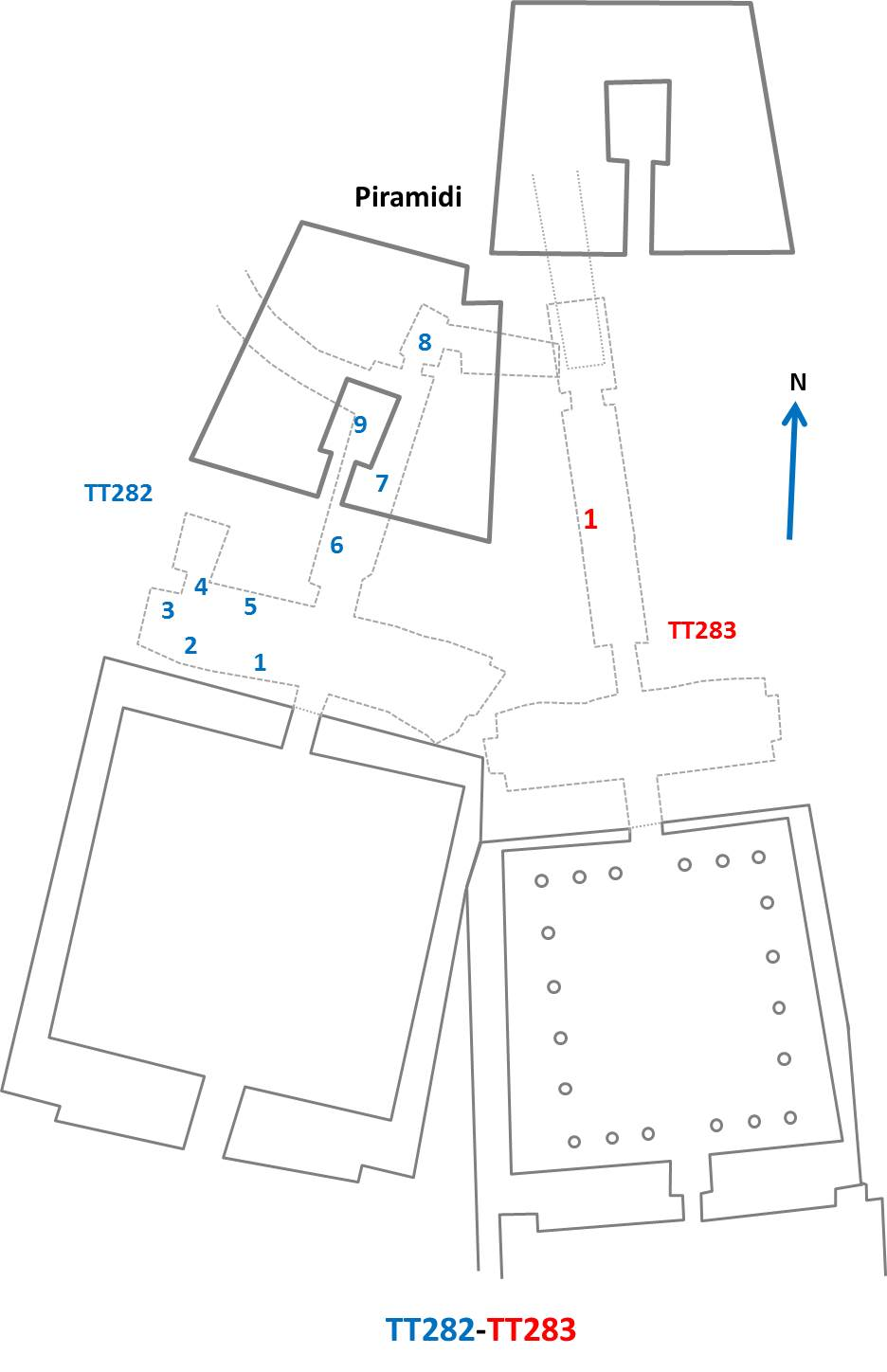

- Location within Egypt
- Location: Dra' Abu el-Naga', Theban Necropolis
- ← Previous; TT281 Next → TT283

n M3 Aa1 t
Nakht
in hieroglyphs
Era: New Kingdom
(1550–1069 BC)

The Theban Tomb TT282 is located in Dra' Abu el-Naga', part of the Theban Necropolis, on the west bank of the Nile, opposite to Luxor. It is the burial place of the ancient Egyptian Nakhtmin, also called Nakht, who lived during the reign of Ramesses II of the 19th Dynasty.

The tomb's owner is named Nakht and initially Fischer conjectured that the tomb belonged to Heqanakht, but the titles do not seem to match. The tomb was then conjectured to belong to Anhernakht, who was likely the son of Minnakht and Tanedjemet.

Later work by Lanny Bell shows that the tomb belongs to Nakhtmin. The tomb contained two sarcophagi which did not record the names, but items including a faience knob and ushabtis are inscribed for Nakhtmin (sometimes transliterated as Minnakht).

== See also ==
- List of Theban tombs
