= Delia Pemberton =

Delia Pemberton (born 1954) is an author and lecturer in Egyptology, formerly with the British Museum and Birkbeck College, University of London, UK. Best known for her work in museum education, she has published a number of popular works on ancient Egypt and related topics for both adults and children.

== Partial bibliography ==
=== Books and articles for adults ===
- City Guide: Cairo and Luxor, Collins Travellers' series, HarperCollins, 1991
- Travellers' Architectural Guides: Ancient Egypt, Viking Penguin (UK)/Chronicle (US), 1992
- The British Museum Pocket Treasury, British Museum Press (reprinted 2004/2006 as The British Museum Little Book of Treasures), 1996
- 'Young Visitors' in Behind the Scenes at the British Museum, ed A. Burnett and J. Reeve, British Museum Press, 2001
- Treasures of the Pharaohs, (introduction by Joann Fletcher), Duncan Baird Publications, 2004
- Cats, British Museum Press, 2006

=== Books and articles for children ===
- (Co-author with Geraldine Harris) British Museum Illustrated Encyclopaedia of Ancient Egypt, British Museum Press, 1999
- Egyptian Mummies: People from the Past, British Museum Press, 2001
- The Pyramid Activity Book, British Museum Press, 2003
- My Egyptian Mummy File, British Museum Press, 2003
- (Co-author with Daniel Pemberton) The Mammoth Prehistoric Activity Book, British Museum Press, 2004
- 'Talking Pictures: Ancient Egyptian Hieroglyphics' in Young Archaeologist 122, Winter 2004
- The British Museum Illustrated Atlas of Egypt, British Museum Press, 2005
