= Amenhotep (Huy) =

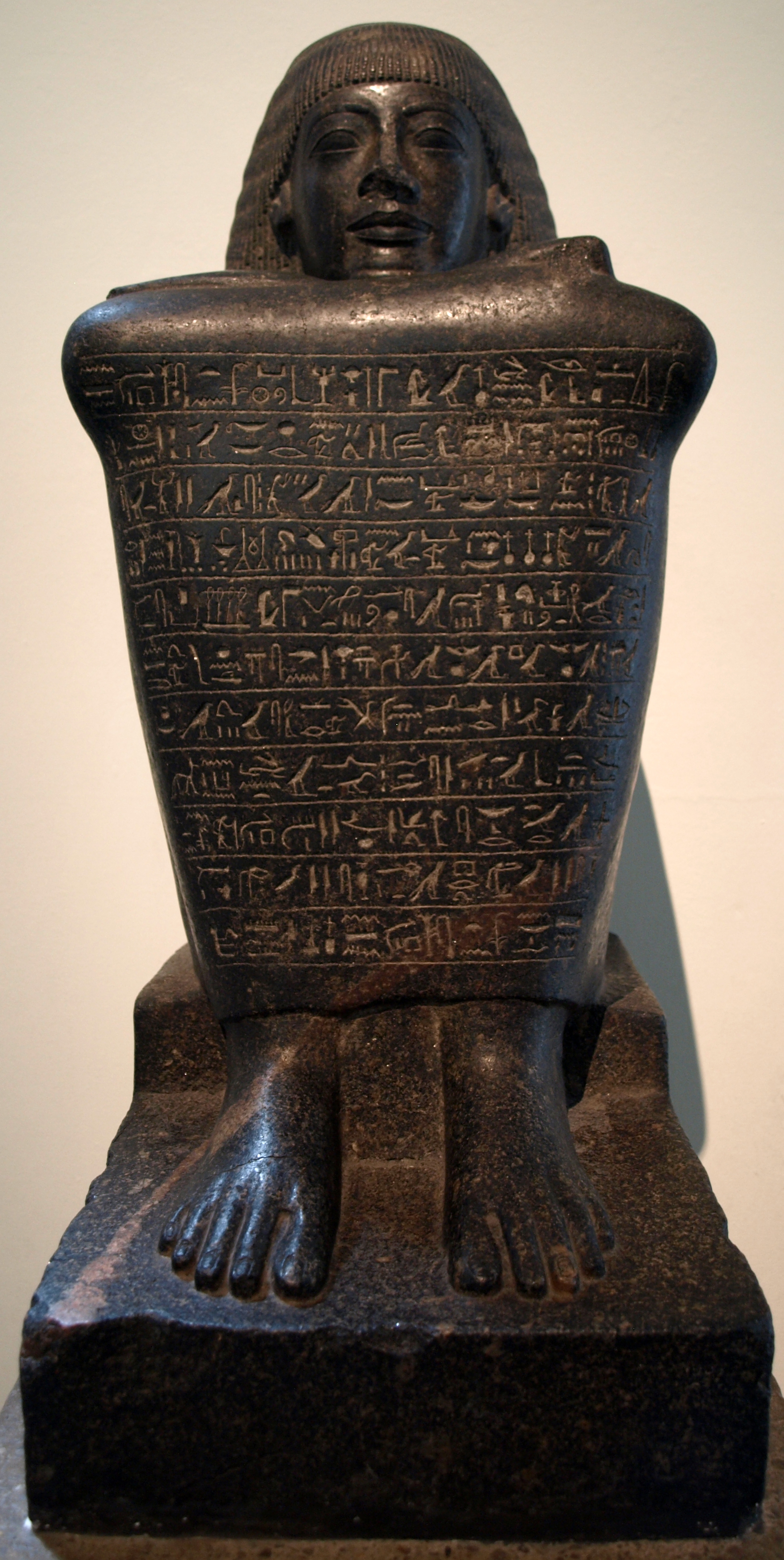
Block statue of Amenhotep, found at Abydos. British Museum.

Amenhotep (Huy) was the high steward of Memphis under Amenhotep III in the Egyptian 18th Dynasty. With this title he was one of the highest officials at the royal court.

== Family ==
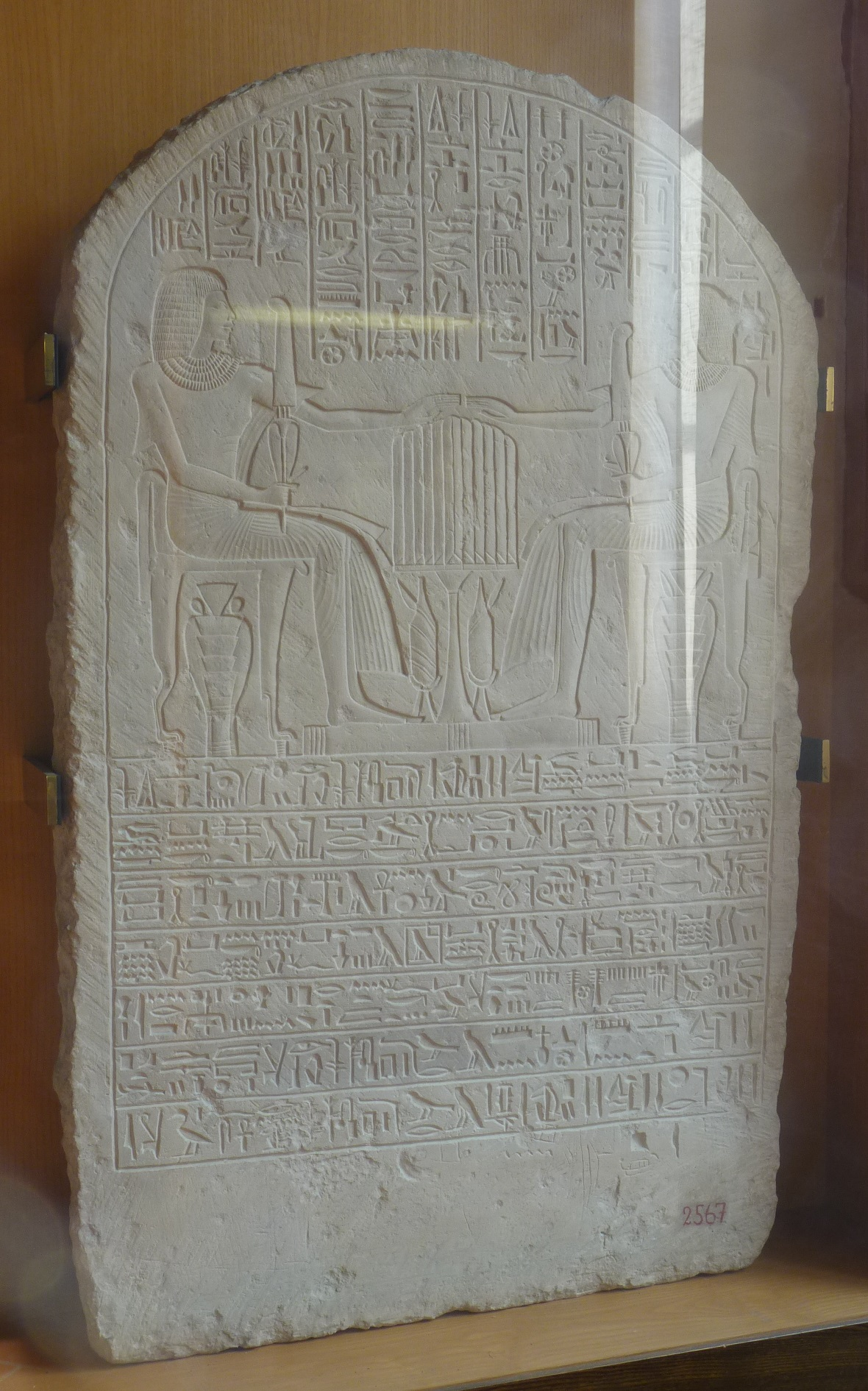
Stela depicting Amenhotep and his son Ipy. Both Stewards of Memphis

Amenhotep, with the nickname Huy, was a member of an influential family. His father Heby was mayor of Memphis. His brother Ramose was vizier under Amenhotep III.

His son Ipy was high steward under Akhenaten. Ipy likely succeeded his father sometime after the first Heb-Sed festival of Amenhotep III. He appears in the tomb of his uncle Ramose at the end of the reign of Amenhotep III when he has taken over his father's duties.

The family member's accomplishments are one of the rare cases where an influential family kept its high position under the latter king.

== Biography ==
Amenhotep is known from a high number of monuments and artifacts. Another fine statue was found at Abydos. Already in the early 19th century (1821 or 22), his looted tomb was found in Saqqara. It contained a sarcophagus, a granite canopic chest, model scribal boards and a stele with a long religious text.

The scribal palettes are now in the Metropolitan Museum of Art (Acc. No. 37.2.1), the Louvre (Inv. No. 833), in the National Archaeological Museum (Florence) (Inv. No. 133) and in Museum of Fine Arts, Boston (72.663 a-i). The cubit rod (Inv. No. 132), the limestone stele (Inv. No. 2.), a grey granite pyramidion (Inv. No. 63) and 5 alabaster jars (Inv. Nos. between 83 and 110) are now all in the Museum in Florence. The Rijksmuseum van Oudheden in Leiden has a red granite pyramidion (Inv. No. A.M. 6), a quartzite canopic chest (Inv. No. A.M.2) and a wooden leg of a stool.

A stela belonging to Amenhotep was found at the Monastery of Apa Jeremias where it had been used as a window sill. Two statues belonging to Amenhotep have been found. One now in the Ashmolean Museum, and the other in the British Museum.

In Memphis, there was found a statue reporting his building work for his king. The statue now in the Ashmolean museum records how Amenhotep donated land, serfs and animals. In return he would receive part of the daily royal offerings, which would be placed before his statue.

== Tomb ==
Amenhotep's now lost tomb had been discovered in 1821 or 1822 and items such as the scribal palettes, the cubit rods and the jars had been removed. The tomb was possibly excavated by Nizzoli and Anastasi. The tomb appears to have been a standard New Kingdom tomb and had two subterranean chambers: an antechamber and a burial chamber. The tomb was undecorated, but a stele depicting Amenhotep and his son Ipy was likely found in the tomb. The tomb also contained a very large sarcophagus with a large lid, but those are presumably still in the tomb. The sarcophagus contained the small pyramidion, the cubit rod, an alabaster palette and at least some of the jars.

The tomb would have further consisted of a brick built chapel and this structure would have been topped by the granite pyramidion (now in Leiden). Another quartzite stele was likely situated in this chapel. The stele depicted Amenhotep and his wife Mey before the gods Osiris, Ptah, Isis and Hathor.
