= Imiseba =

Imiseba was an ancient Egyptian official of the 19th Dynasty in the Ramesside Period. He is mainly known from his decorated rock cut chapel at Lepidotonpolis (modern El Mashayikh). He had several important titles, including true scribe of the lord of the two lands and chief archivist of the lord of the two lands. These are evidently important functions at the royal court. The lord of the two lands was the king. Perhaps later in his career he took over some functions in the temple administration. He became high steward in the domain of Khonsu and high steward of Khons.

Several sons are named in the tomb chapel, but the names of his wife and of his parents did not survive. His tomb is cut into the local rocks. There is a chapel consisting of one room that is fully decorated with reliefs showing Imiseba in several underworld scenes. There is also the depiction of a poultry farm. This is so far a unique scene for an Ancient Egyptian tomb chapel. The underground parts of the tomb are quite big and consist of several rooms. They were most likely used for Imiseba, but also for family members.

== See also ==
- List of ancient Egyptian scribes
