= Ta-wer =

Region of ancient Egypt

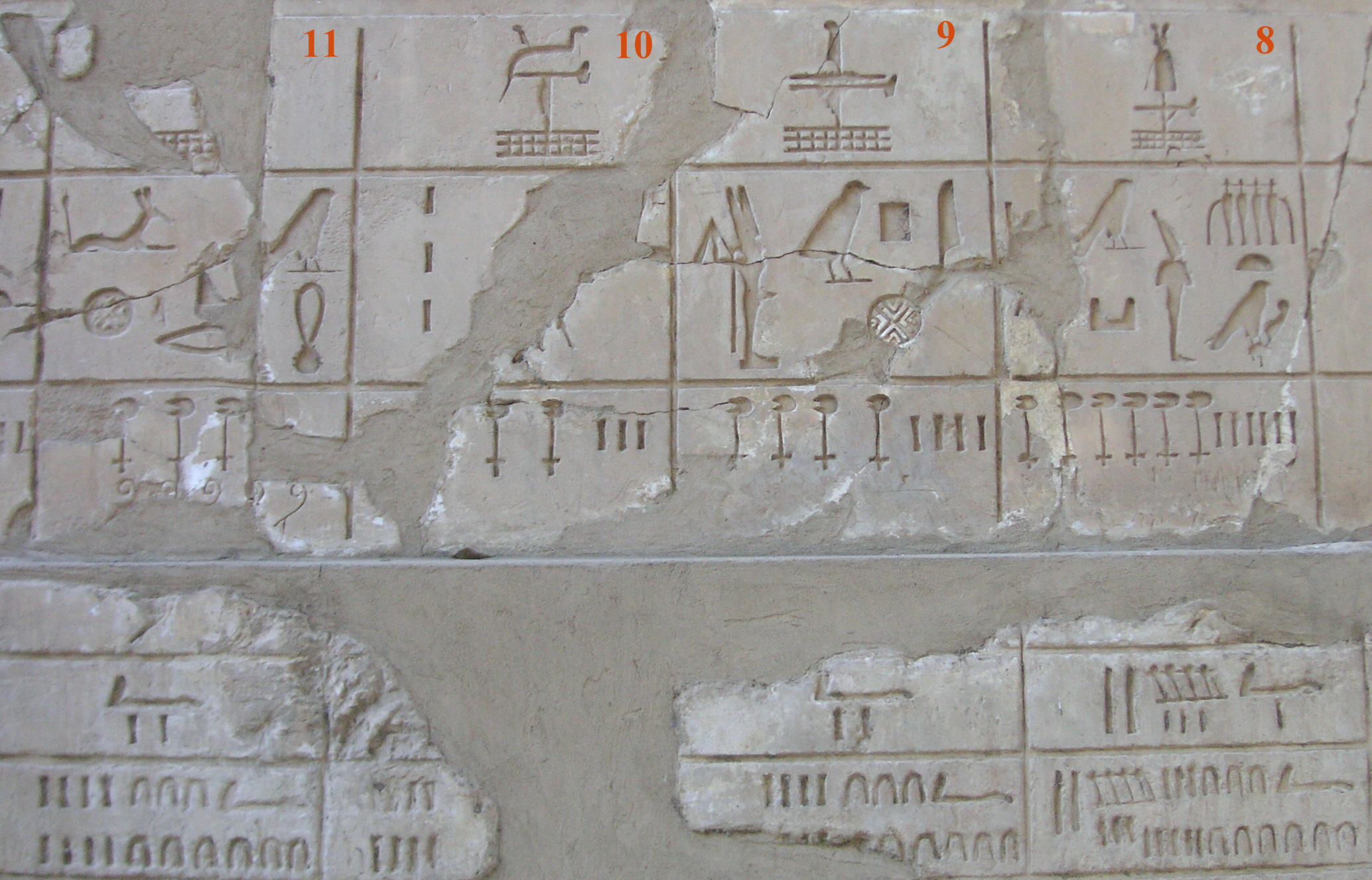
The Ta-wer nome on the White Chapel of Senusret I (right)

Ta-wer (the great land) was the 8th Upper Egyptian ancient nome. Its capital was Thinis, and another important town was Abydos. The exact borders of the nome are not known for sure, but the southern border might have been near Abu Tesht (ancient Pi-djodj). The Northern border was most likely North of Hagarsa where there are Old Kingdom tombs connected with the 8th nome.

Important cemeteries of the nome were found at Naga ed-Deir.

Several nomarchs (provincial governors) are known by name, including Gegi and Khubau.
