= The Children of the Wind =

British fantasy novel

The Children of the Wind is a novel by Geraldine Harris published in 1982.

== Plot summary ==
The Children of the Wind is a novel in which there is a quest for seven keys for each of seven sorcerers.

== Reception ==
Dave Langford reviewed The Children of the Wind for White Dwarf #58, and stated that "Harris is reasonably – though not wildly – inventive, and puts real effort into making her characters humanly flawed and changeable."

== Reviews ==
- Review by Roger C. Schlobin (1983) in Fantasy Newsletter, #62 September 1983
- Review by Baird Searles (1983) in Isaac Asimov's Science Fiction Magazine, November 1983
