= Khubau =

- Nomarch of the 8th nome of Upper Egypt
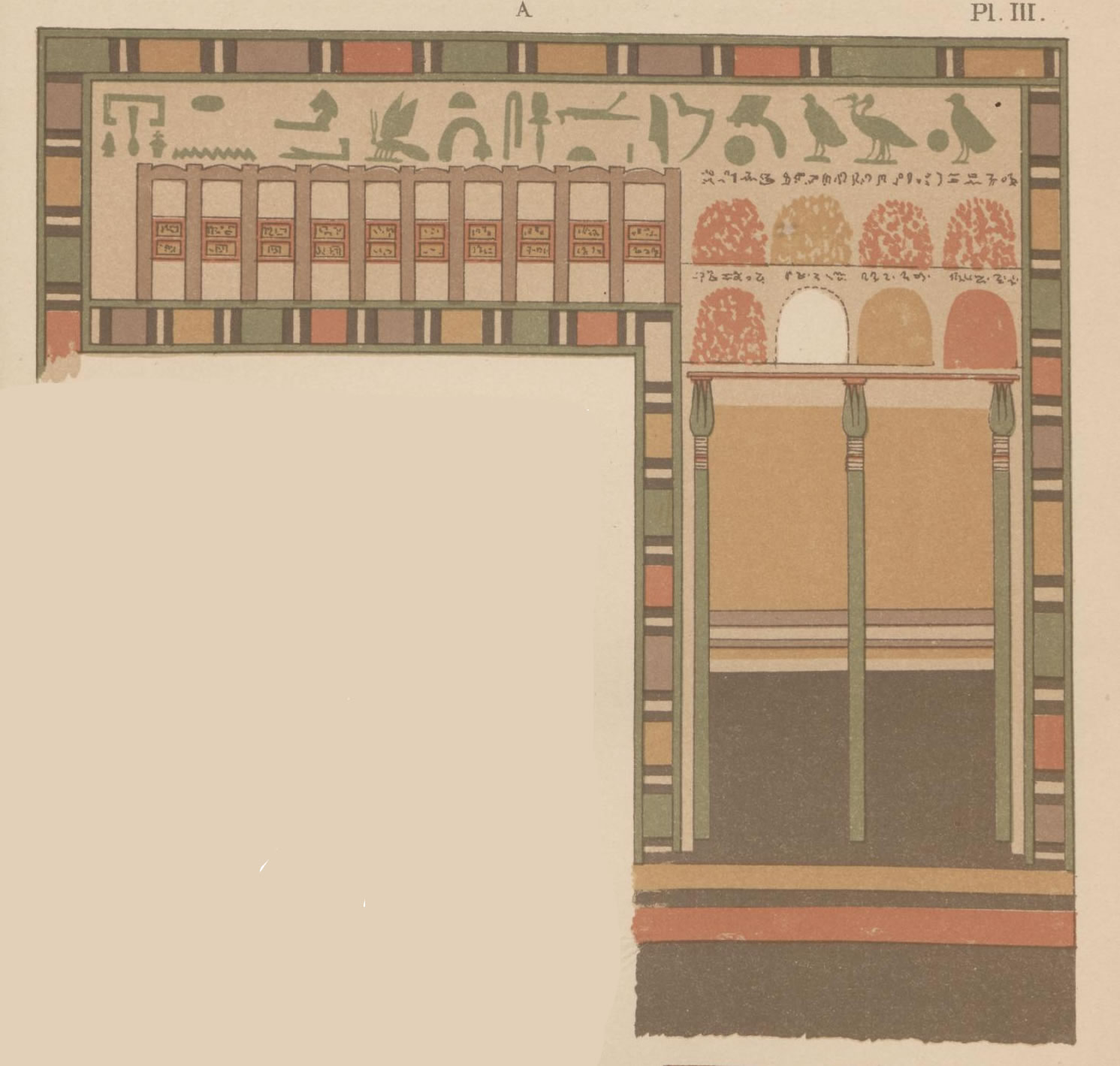
- A decorated wall in the tomb of Khubau
- Dynasty: 6th dynasty
- Pharaoh: Pepi II Neferkare (possibly)
- Burial: Badrashin, Giza, Egypt

Khubau (fl. c. 2300 BC) was an ancient Egyptian high official who lived at the end of the Old Kingdom in the 6th Dynasty. He might date under king Pepi II or shortly after. Khubau is known from his tomb at Saqqara close to the Pyramid of Pepi II. His proper tomb was found by Gaston Maspero. Further elements, including two small obelisks and a small stela were excavated by Gustave Jéquier

Khubau had several titles. He was priest at the pyramid of Pepi II, overseer of priests but also overlord of Ta-wer. With the latter position, he was nomarch of Ta-wer, the 8th Upper Egyptian nome.

His tomb consists of a shaft with a decorated burial chamber, showing offerings.
