= Lepidotonpolis =

Nag' el-Mashayekh نجع المشايخ
- Location in Egypt
- Coordinates: 26°20′20″N 31°56′18″E
- Country: Egypt
- Governorate: Sohag
- Time zone: UTC+2 (EST)

O1 Z1 V22 M17 M17 X1 O49
pr mḥjt
in hieroglyphs
Era: 2nd Intermediate Period
(1650–1550 BC)

Lepidotonpolis (Ancient Greek: Λεπιδότων πόλις) is the Greek name of an ancient Egyptian town in Upper Egypt under the modern village Nag' El Mashayikh opposite to modern Girga. The ancient Egyptian name of the place was perhaps Behedet jabtet - or Per mehit according to Gauthier. Under the modern village are the remains of a New Kingdom temple. Fragments with the names of the Egyptian kings Amenophis III, Ramesses II, and Merneptah were found. The main deity of the place was the lion goddess Mehit. The lepidotus fish was here worshiped too. Near the temple is an ancient cemetery including the decorated rock cut tomb of Anhurmose and the tomb of the royal scribe Imiseba.

== See also ==
- List of ancient Egyptian towns and cities
