= Thinite Confederacy =

Hypothesized tribal confederation of ancient Egypt

- ?–c. 3100 BC
- Status: Tribal confederation
- Capital: Thinis
- Common languages: Egyptian
- Religion: Ancient Egyptian
- Tribal chief
  - c. 3100 BC: Menes
- Historical era: Prehistoric Egypt
  - Established: ?
  - Disestablished: c. 3100 BC
  - Unification of Egypt: c. 3100 BC
| Preceded by | Succeeded by |
| Naqada III | Early Dynastic Period (Egypt) |

The Thinite Confederacy is an Egyptological term for a hypothesized tribal confederation in ancient Egypt. It is thought to have preceded the full unification of Upper Egypt c. 3100 BC. The leaders of the Thinite Confederacy were most likely tribal nobles. Based at the city of Thinis, the Thinite Confederacy would later be incorporated into the combined state known as "Upper and Lower Egypt".

The evidence of the "Thinite Confederacy" is mostly speculative and in part relies on Manetho. Modern Egyptologists have a number of competing hypotheses to explain conjectured "proto-dynastic" events that presumably led to the unification under the First Dynasty. Many scholars today mention evidence for a "Dynasty 0" that preceded the First Dynasty I. The term "Dynasty 00" is also used for the period preceding Dynasty 0 in connection with the Abydos-Thinis area and may correspond to a theoretical "Thinite Confederacy". The terms "Dynasty 0" and especially "Dynasty 00" are widely seen as playful, but are frequently used nonetheless in absence of a more agreed-upon term.

In archaeological terms, this is referred to as "Naqada III".

It makes an appearance in the PC game Pharaoh.

== Bibliography ==
- Brink, Edwin C. M. van den (1992). The Nile Delta in Transition: 4th.-3rd. Millennium B.C. : Proceedings of the Seminar Held in Cairo, 21.-24. October 1990, at the Netherlands Institute of Archaeology and Arabic Studies. E.C.M. van den Brink. ISBN 978-965-221-015-9.
- Maspero, Gaston (2003). History of Egypt. Kessinger Publishing. ISBN 978-0-7661-3501-7.
