= Ipy (noble) =

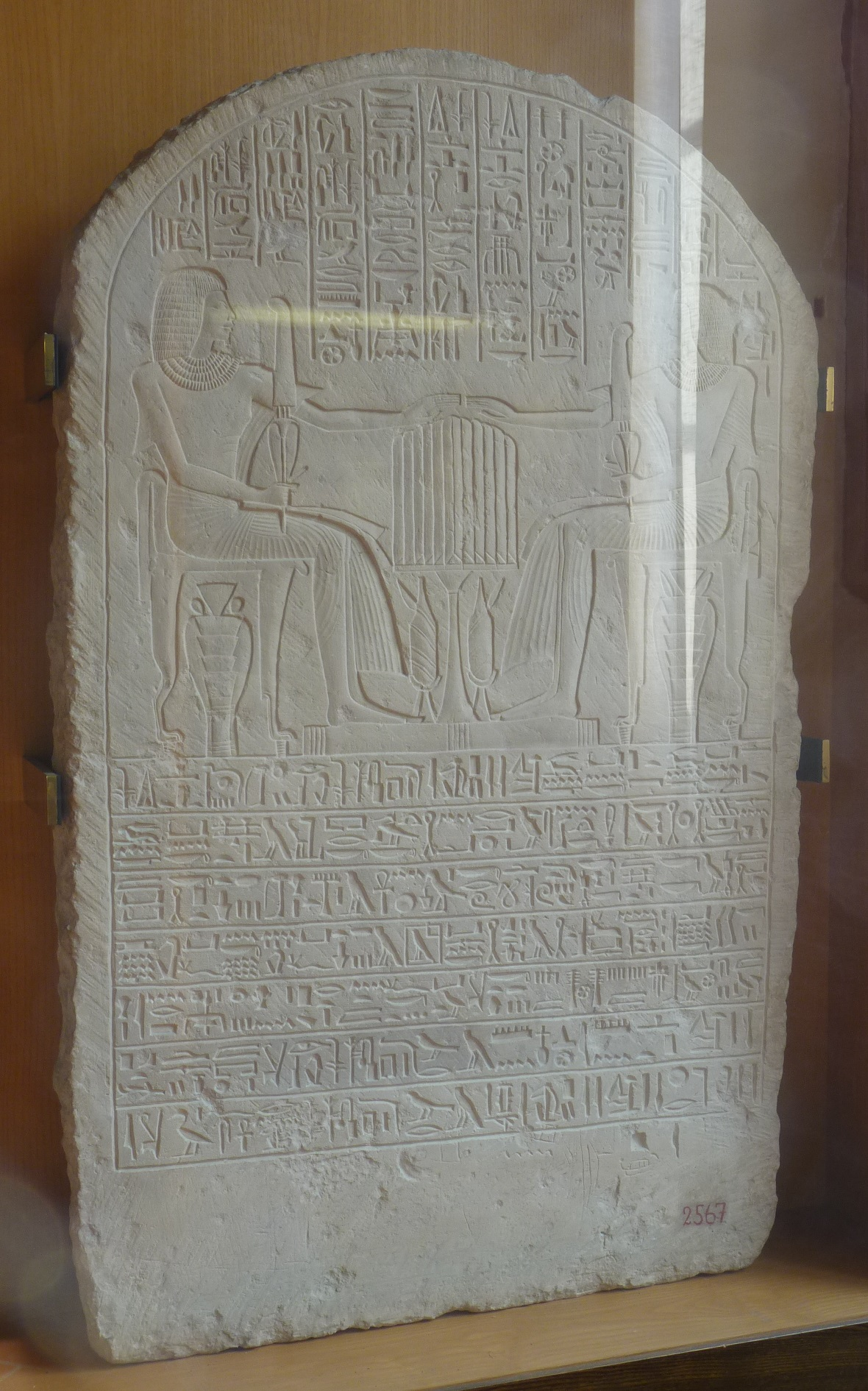
Stela depicting Amenhotep and his son Ipy. Both Stewards of Memphis

Ipy, also transliterated as Apy, was a court official from the time of Amenhotep III and Akhenaten during the Egyptian 18th Dynasty. Ipy was High Steward of Memphis, and a royal scribe.

== Biography ==
Ipy came from a family of well-known court officials. He was the son of Amenhotep (Huy), the High steward of Memphis and his wife May, and he was the grandson of the Mayor of Memphis Heby. The Vizier Ramose was an uncle of Ipy.

Ipy succeeded his father sometime after the first Heb-Sed festival of Amenhotep III. He appears in the tomb of his uncle Ramose at the end of the reign of Amenhotep III when he has taken over his father's duties. He continued in office under Akhenaten, and eventually did not just work in Memphis, but was a presence in Akhetaten as well.

In Akhenaten's year five Ipy wrote a report to the King reporting that both state and temple properties in Memphis were faring well. After that Ipy became the Overseer of the inner palace of pharaoh in Akhetaten. Ipy is known to have had a house in this city as well.

== Tombs ==
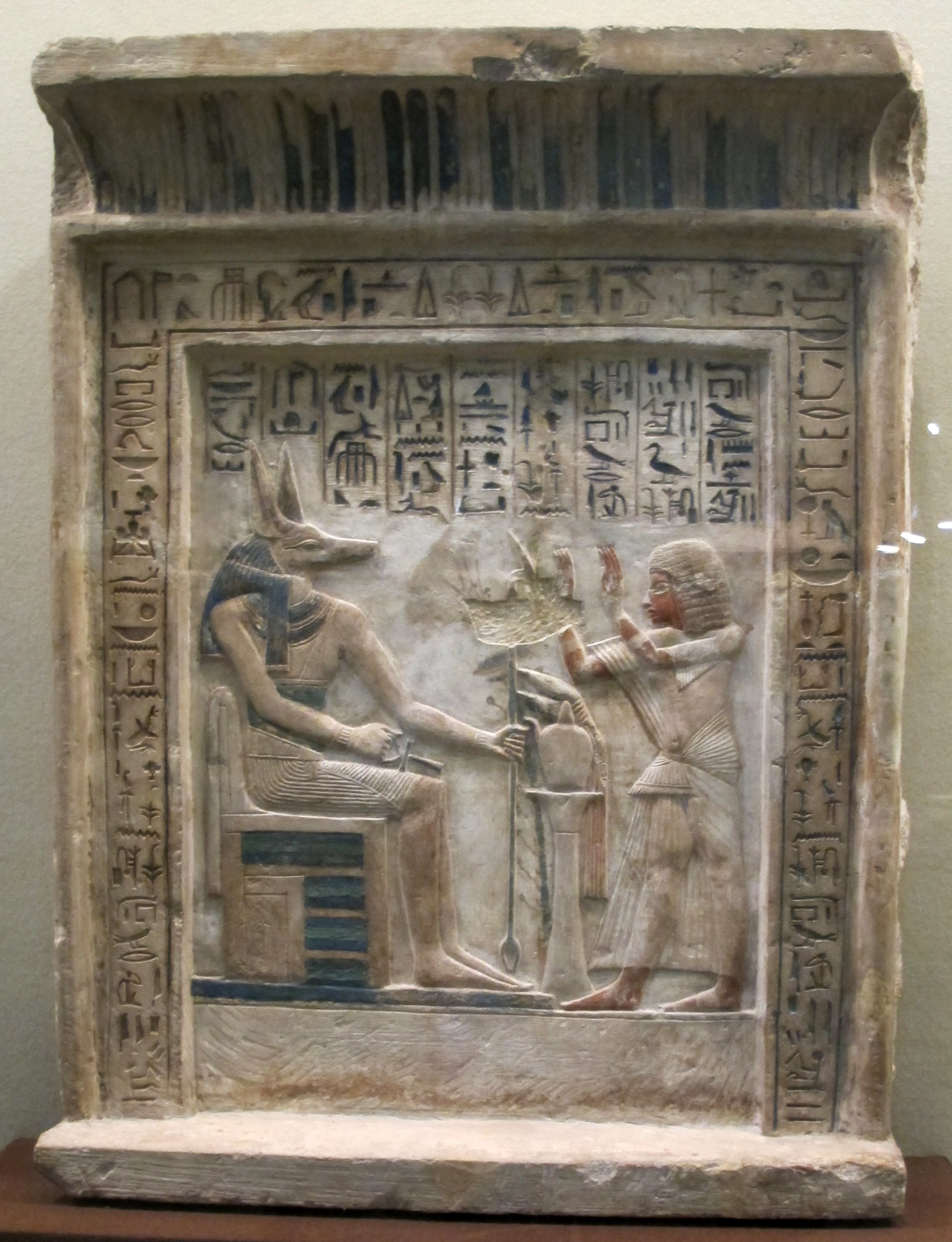
Stela of Ipy

According to Dodson Ipy had a tomb prepared in Thebes, namely TT136. This tomb is said to have included four images of Akhenaten in an Osirian pose. However Ipy was never residing in Thebes, making it unlikely that he was the owner of this tomb.

Ipy may have also had a tomb prepared in Amarna. This tomb is now known as tomb 10. The tomb is small and unfinished. William C. Hayes questions the identification of the Ipy from Amarna with the Ipy from Memphis based on the lack of titles borne by the Amarna official. Ipy is only given the titles of royal scribe and steward. The tomb contains typical elements such as a copy of the Great Hymn to the Aten and scenes of the royal family worshipping the Aten. Akhenaten and Nefertiti are for instance shown offering votive items – cartouches of the Aten flanked by small statue(s) – to the Aten. Meritaten, Meketaten and Ankhesenpaaten are shown behind their parents shaking sistra.

Martin mentions a tomb for Ipy in Memphis. This tomb has not been located however. The tomb is likely located not far from the tomb of his father Amenhotep (Huy). Two of Ipy's canopic jars were found by Giovanni Anastasi, and are now in the Rijksmuseum van Oudheden in Leiden. A relief from his Memphite tomb appeared before 2011 on the art market.
