= Nebwenenef =

Ancient Egyptian High Priest of Amun

- High Priest of Amun
Egyptian name
V30 E34 n&n&f A51
- Tenure: 1279-1268 BC
- Predecessor: Nebneteru Tenry
- Successor: Hori
- Dynasty: 19th Dynasty
- Pharaoh: Ramesses II
- Born: c. 1330 BC
- Died: c. 1268 BC
- Burial: TT 157
- Spouse: Takhat
- Father: Sematawy I
- Children: Sematawy II, High Priest of Hathor

Nebwenenef (lived c. 1330 to c. 1268 BC) was High Priest of Amun at the beginning of the reign of Ramesses II during the 19th Dynasty. Prior to that, Nebwenenef had served as High Priest of Anhur and High Priest of Hathor during the reign of Seti I and possibly even earlier.

== Titles ==
In his tomb (TT157) a large number of titles are recorded as being held by Nebwenenef:

- High Priest of Amun
- High Priest of Anhur
- High Priest of Hathor
- Superintendent of the double treasury of silver and gold (of Amun)
- Superintendent of the granary
- Chief of Works and Chief of all the craftsmen in Thebes
- Superintendent of Prophets of all Gods, to his South (as far) as Heriheramun, and to his North, (as far) as Thinis
- Noble
- Count
- God's Father
- Chief of Secrets in heaven, earth and the Netherworld(?)
- Dignitary for the People
- Chief of Seers, pure of hands in Thebes
- Superintendent of the Prophets of South and North Egypt
- Chief of Secrets in Southern Heliopolis (Thebes)

== Family ==
Nebwenenef's wife was named Takhat. She held the titles of Chief of the Harem of Amun, Sistrum Player of Mut, Chief of the Harem of Hathor and Songstress of Isis the mighty. Nebwenenef had a son Sematawy (II) and a daughter named Hathor. Sematawy (II) succeeded his father as High Priest of Hathor. Hathor held the title of Chief of the Harem of Hathor, Lady of Dendera. A sister of Nebwenenef named Irytnofret is also depicted on the tomb.

According to an inscription in his tomb, Nebwenenef was the son of the First Prophet of Hathor, overseer of the cattle, overseer of the fields, overseer of the granary, Sematawy (I). The text goes on to list further ancestors holding the title First Prophets of Hathor: Sa-en-Hathor (II), Amenhotep, Sa-Hathor (I) and Nefer. The genealogy provides the names the long line of High Priests of Hathor referred to in the Theban Tomb. A statue of A priest of Hathor named Basa dated to the 22nd or 23rd dynasty records a detailed genealogy claiming that Basa is a direct descendant of Nebwenenef.

== Life ==
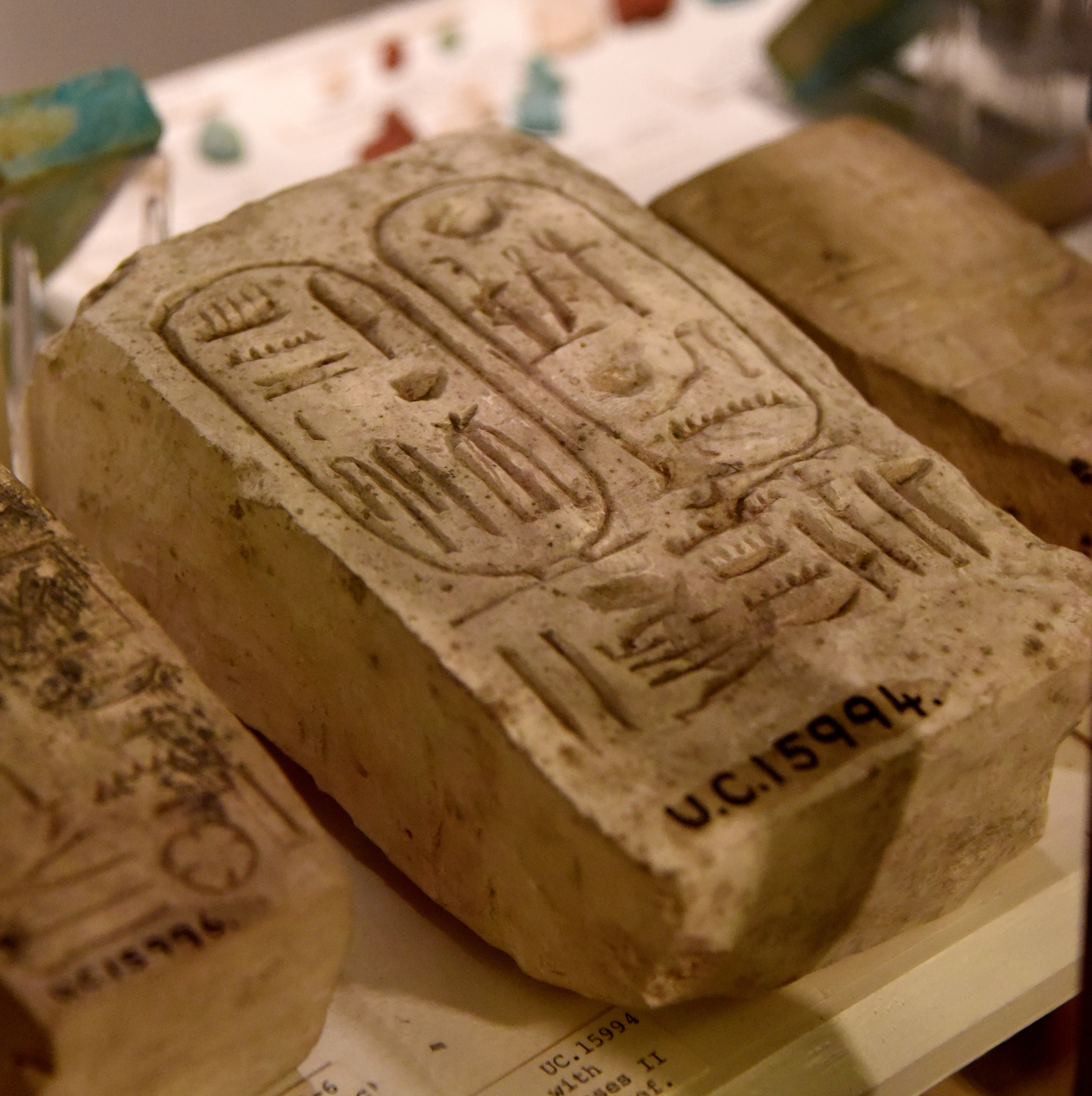
Fragment of a limestone block showing the cartouche of Ramesses II and the name of Nebwenenef. 19th Dynasty. From Kurna (Qurna), Thebes, Egypt. The Petrie Museum of Egyptian Archaeology, London

Before being appointed High Priest of Amun, Nebwenenef was High Priest of Hathor at Dendera and High Priest of Anhur at Thinis. He was appointed High Priest of Amun in Year 1, III Akhet of Ramesses II, and subsequently his son Sematawy II became High Priest of Hathor. This post had apparently always been held by his family according to an inscription:

Landing was made in the Thinite Province, and the (future) High Priest of Amun, Nebwenenef, justified was ushered in before His Majesty. Now he was (then) High Priest of Anhur, and High Priest of Hathor, Lady of Dendera, and Superintendent of Prophets of all Gods, to his south (as far) as Heriheramun, and to his North, (as far) as Thinis. Then said His Majesty to him:

You are now High Priest of Amun! His treasury and his granary are under your seal. You are chief executive of his temple and every foundation of his is under your authority. The House of Hathor, Lady of Dendera (shall now be) under the authority of your son as regular(?) heir to the offices of your forefathers, the position (which) you have occupied hitherto.

(I swear), as Re lives for me and loves me, and as my father Amun favors me, I set out for him the whole court, and the chief executive of the troops. There were repeated (before) him the prophets of the gods, and the notables of his House, who were in his presence. But he was not satisfied with any of them, until I mentioned your name to him.

After the announcement King Ramesses II gave him two gold signet rings and an electrum staff of office. All at once Nebwenenef had been promoted to High priest of Amun, Superintendent of the double treasury of silver and gold (of Amun), superintendent of the granary, Chief of Works and Chief of all the craftsmen in Thebes. A royal envoy was dispatched to announce Nebwenenef's promotion throughout the land.

== Tomb ==
Theban tomb TT157
- Burial site of Nebwenenef
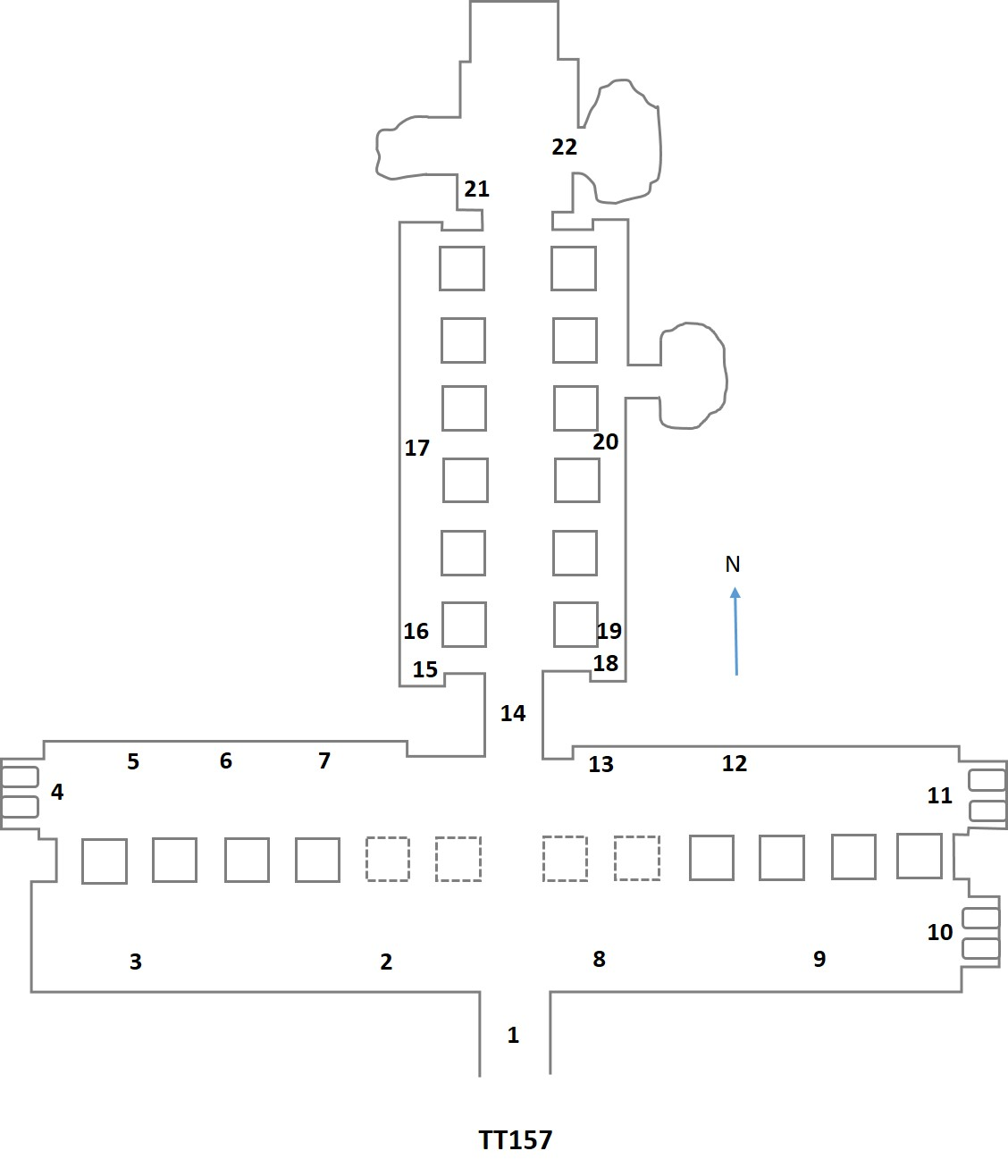
- Location: Dra' Abu el-Naga', Theban Necropolis
- Excavated by: Lepsius (19th century), University of Pennsylvania (1970–present), Universities of Heidelberg and Leipzig (2002–present).
- ← Previous; TT156 Next → TT158

Nebwenenef was buried in the Theban Tomb TT157 located in Dra' Abu el-Naga', part of the Theban Necropolis, on the west bank of the Nile, opposite to Luxor.

Nebwenenef is shown in his tomb followed by a fan-bearer appearing before Ramesses II and Queen Nefertari in a palace window. Nebwenenef is being appointed as High priest of Amun (year 1 of Rameses II).

In the 19th century the tomb was recorded by Lepsius (LD Text iii, p 239).

The tomb had been excavated since 1970 by a team from the University of Pennsylvania under the leadership of Dr. Lanny Bell. Since 2002 the Universities of Heidelberg and Leipzig have joined in the work on Nebwenenef's tomb.

Nebwenenef's title and name, by Lepsius.

== Mortuary temple ==
Nebwenenef was also the owner of a mortuary temple at Thebes. Nebwenenef is one of only a select group of commoners who were allowed to construct a temple there. A plan of the temple, as well as some photographs of stelae and foundation deposits, can be found on Digitalegypt (University College London).
