= Parennefer called Wennefer =

Egyptian high priest of Amun

- High Priest of Amun
- Predecessor: Maya
- Successor: Nebneteru Tenry
- Dynasty: 18th Dynasty
- Pharaoh: Tutankhamen, Horemheb
- Burial: Thebes
- Spouse: Isis
- Father: Minhotep
- Mother: Maia
- Children: Amenemone, Chief of Works; Hori, High Priest of Anhur; Amenemope, Chief of Seers (High Priest of Ra); Khaemwaset, Scribe of Sacred Books; Daughters: Hentmehyt

Parennefer also called Wennefer was a High Priest of Amun during the reigns of Tutankhamun and Horemheb (and possibly later). He was previously thought to date to the time of Ramesses II, but he is now dated to the end of the Eighteenth Dynasty. Parennefer was more firmly put at the end of the Eighteenth Dynasty after extensive excavations of his tomb in Thebes in 1990–1993.

Parennefer was High Priest of Anhur and sealbearer of the king before being raised to the position of High Priest of Amun.

== Family ==
Parennefer/Wennefer was a son of Minhotep and Maia. On monuments he is said to have two brothers: Pennesuttawy, who was a troop commander in Kush, and Minmose, who served as the high priest of Min and Isis.

Parennefer/Wennefer was married to Isis, who was Chief of the Harem of Amun. A family monument lists four sons and a daughter.

- The eldest son was named Hori and served as high priest of Anhur after his father. Hori's son Minmose would also serve as high priest of Anhur. It is possible that Hori later served as high priest of Amun under Ramesses II.
- Amenemone is said to have been a childhood friend of Ramesses II and later was the Chief of Works.
- A son by the name of Amenemope served as the Chief of Seers, i.e., as the high priest of Ra in Heliopolis. Amenemope was also a chamberlain of the Lord of the Two Lands.
- Khaemwaset is listed on a monument belonging to Amenemone. Khaemwaset was a scribe of the sacred books in the House of Amun.
- Hentmehyt is married to the Steward of the Temple of Ptah.

Three more daughters are mentioned, but the names have been lost

- A lady who is the wife of the Steward of Amun.
- A lady who is a noblewoman in the House of the King.
- The wife of the Troop Commander of the Chariotry.
