= Ramose (TT55) =

Ancient Egyptian vizier

- Vizier of the South
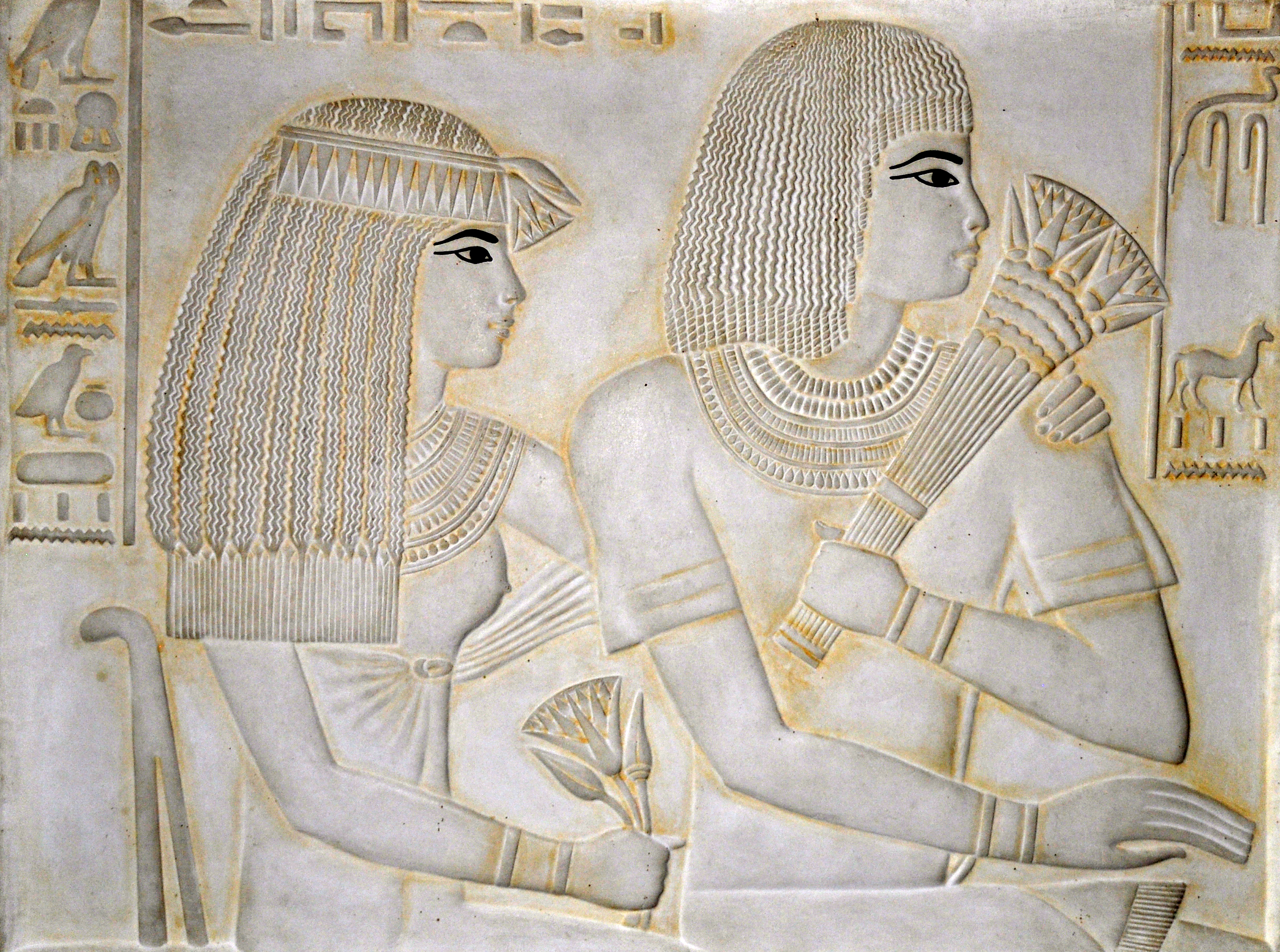
- Ramose and his wife Merit-Ptah, restored relief from their tomb TT55
- Predecessor: Ptahmose
- Successor: Nakhtpaaten
- Pharaoh: Amenhotep III and Akhenaten
- Burial: TT55
- Spouse: Merit-Ptah
- Father: Heby

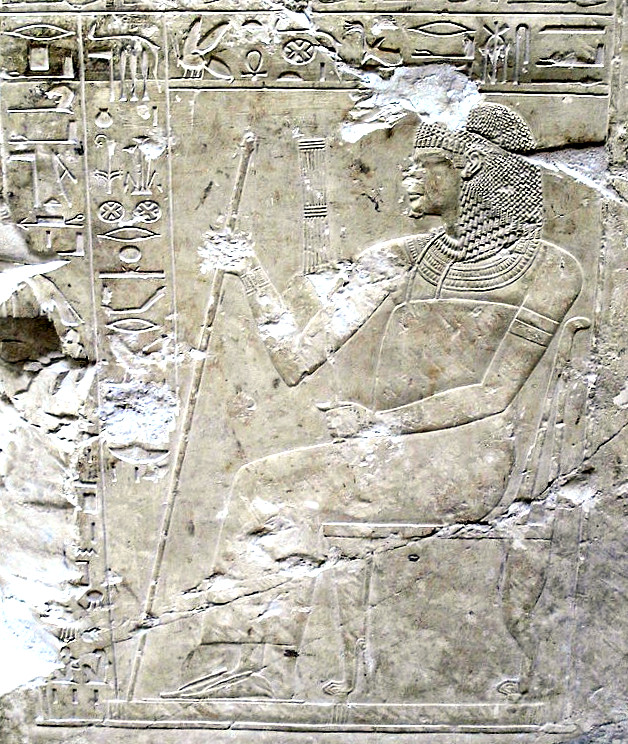
Grab des Ramose (TT55), Zeit des Amenophis III. und Echnaton, in Scheich Abd el-Gurna

The Ancient Egyptian noble, Ramose was Vizier under both Amenhotep III and Akhenaten. He was in office in the last decade of Amenhotep's III reign and at the beginning of the reign of the latter king. Ramose appears on jar labels found in the palace of king Amenhotep III at Malkata. Here appears also the vizier Amenhotep-Huy. Both viziers are also shown side by side in the temple of Soleb. In the New Kingdom the office of the vizier was divided in a northern vizier and a southern one. It is not entirely clear whether Ramose was the southern or northern one.

Ramose was born into an influential family. His father was the mayor of Memphis Heby, in office at the beginning of Amenhotep's III reign. The brother of Ramose was the high steward of Memphis Amenhotep (Huy).

== Tomb ==
His tomb TT55 is located in the Sheikh Abd el-Qurna – part of the Theban Necropolis, on the west bank of the Nile, opposite to Luxor, and is notable for the high quality decorations in both the traditional and Amarna styles.

== Gallery ==
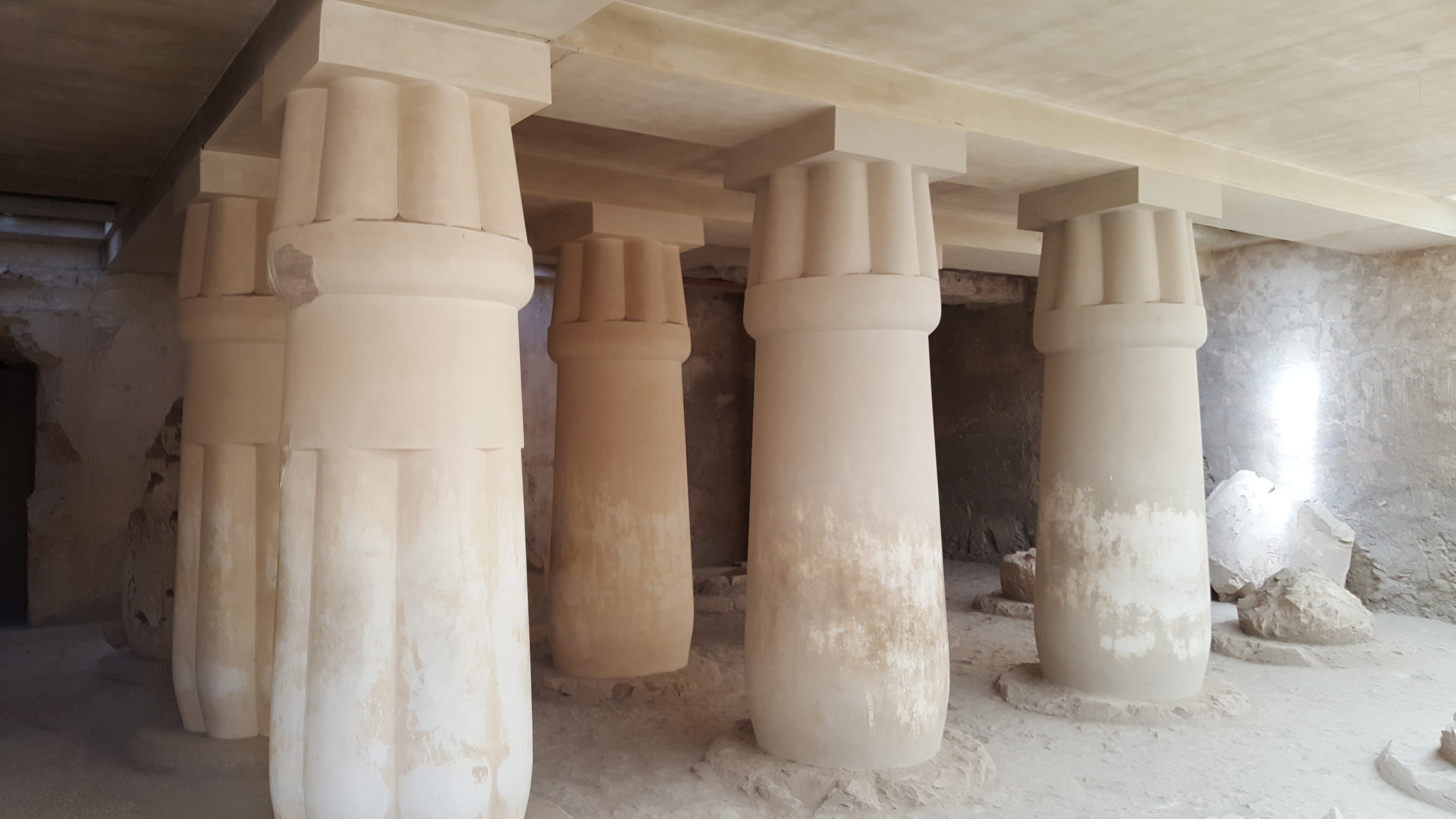
Papyrus shaped stone columns in the tomb of Ramose

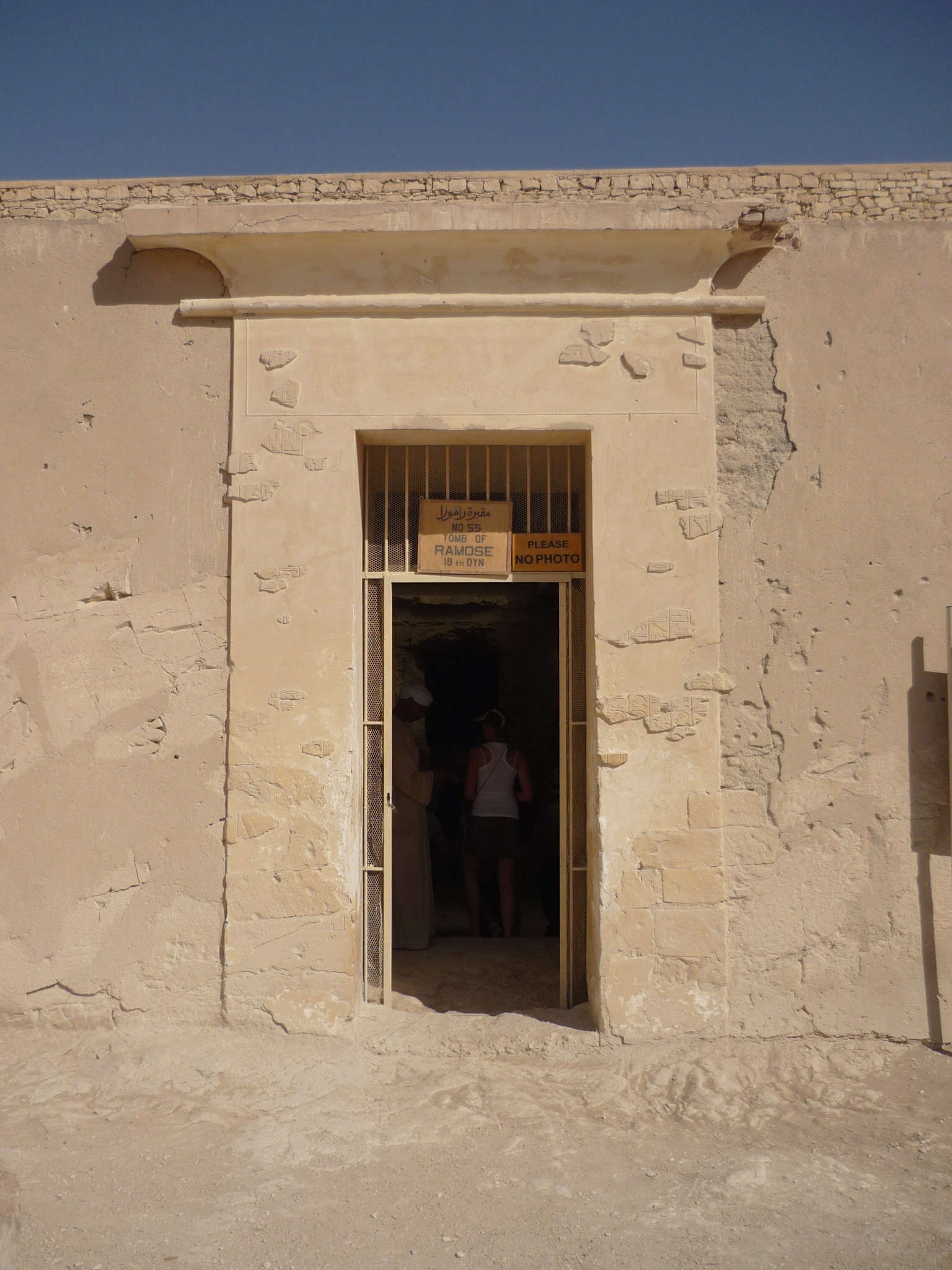
Entrance to the tomb of Ramose

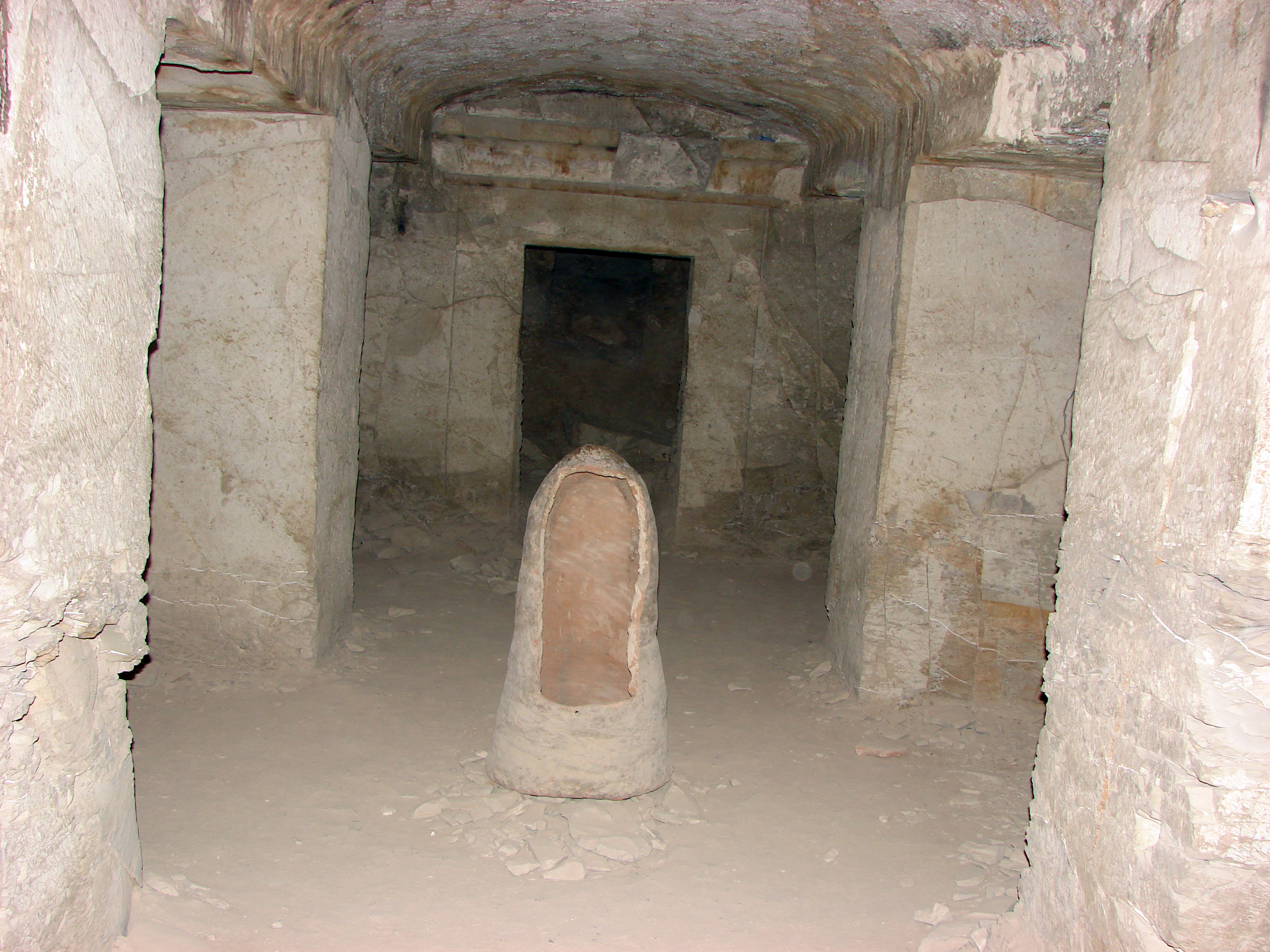
View of Ramose's Tomb burial chamber

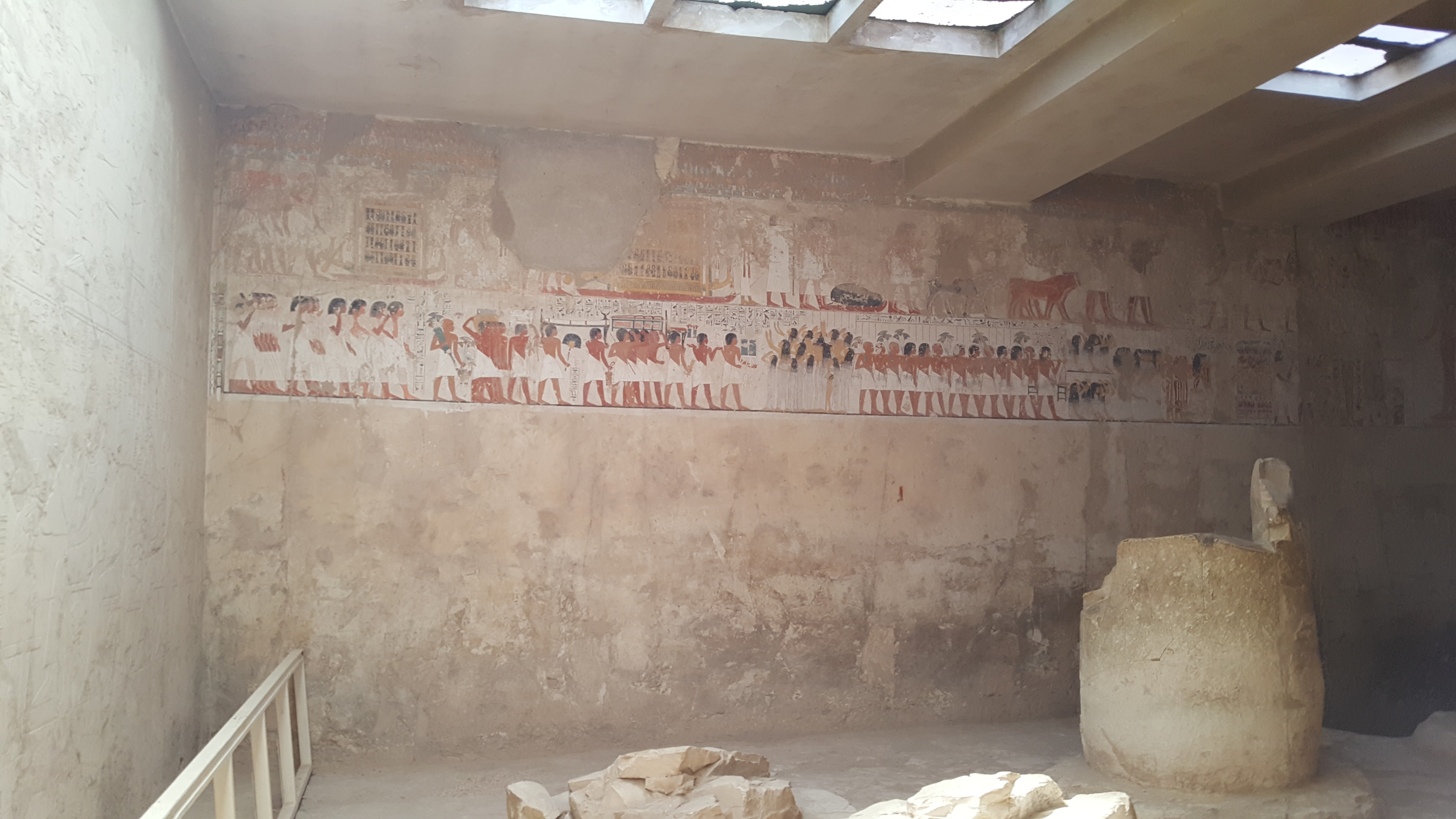
Painted decorations from Ramose's tomb

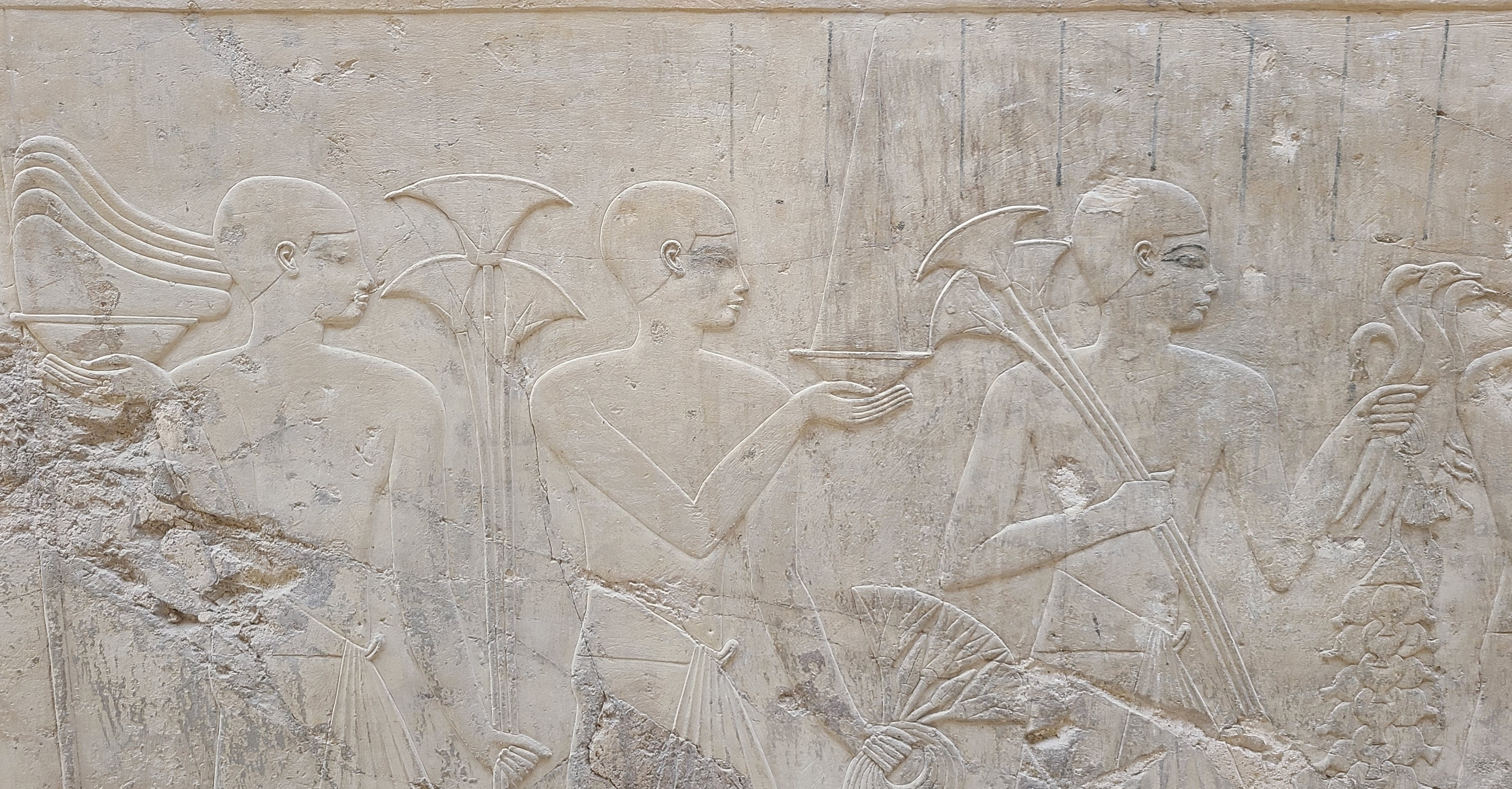
Reliefs of a procession from Ramose's tomb

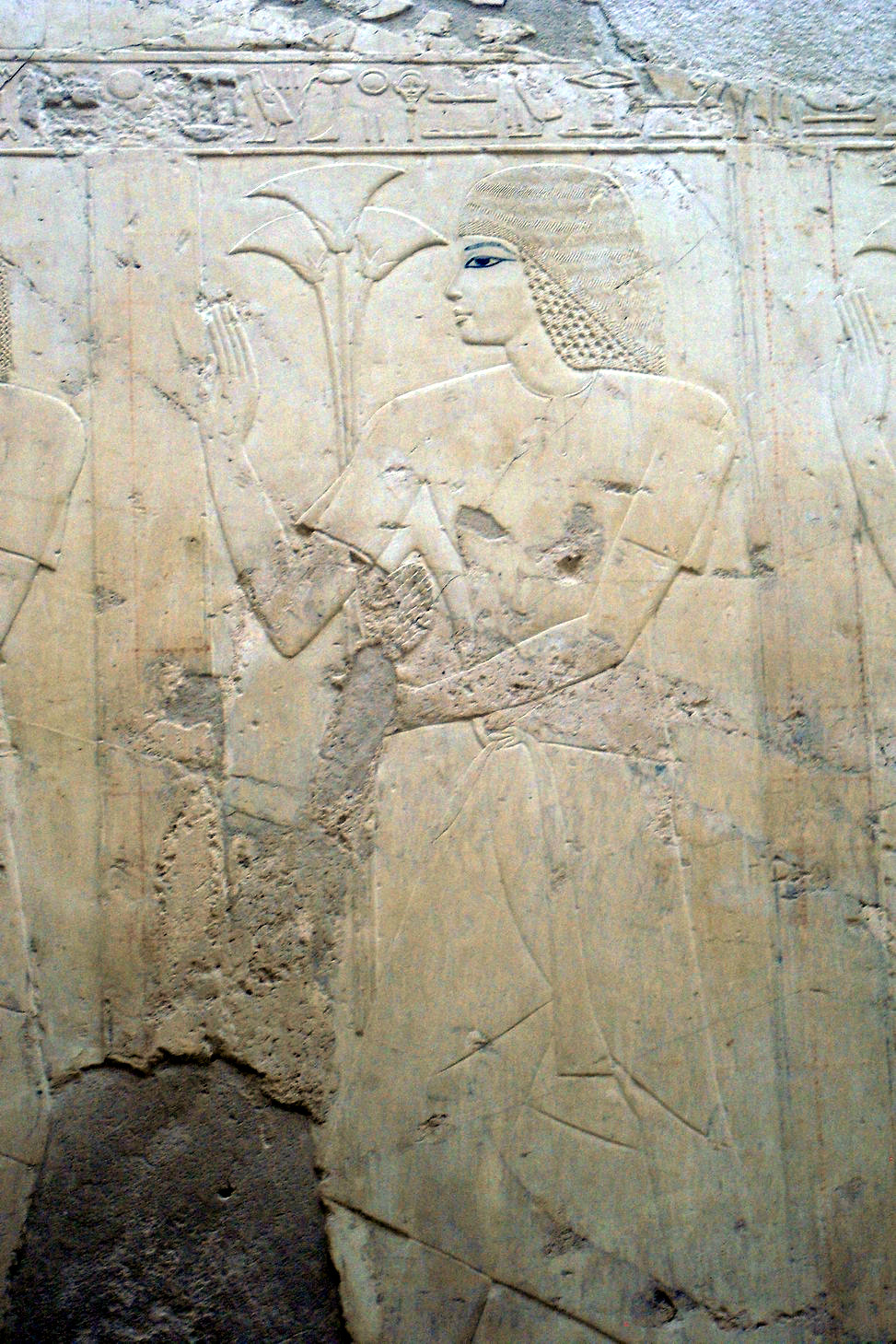
Tomb of Ramose (TT55), Amenhotep III and Akhenaten's reign at Sheikh Abd el-Gurna
