= The Seventh Gate (Harris novel) =

1983 novel by Geraldine Harris

The Seventh Gate is a novel by Geraldine Harris published in 1983.

== Plot summary ==
The Seventh Gate is a novel in which the hero is on a quest to find a Saviour.

== Reception ==
Dave Langford reviewed The Seventh Gate for White Dwarf #66, and stated that "a double-punch finale which fails to surprise you with the identity of the Saviour our hero's been questing for, but then goes one better - pushing fantasy clichés beyond their limits into a kind of realism. Nifty stuff."

== Reviews ==
- Review by Raymond H. Thompson (1984) in Fantasy Review, September 1984
- Review by Helen McNabb (1985) in Vector 126
