= TT156 =

Theban tomb

Theban tomb TT156
- Burial site of Pennesuttawy
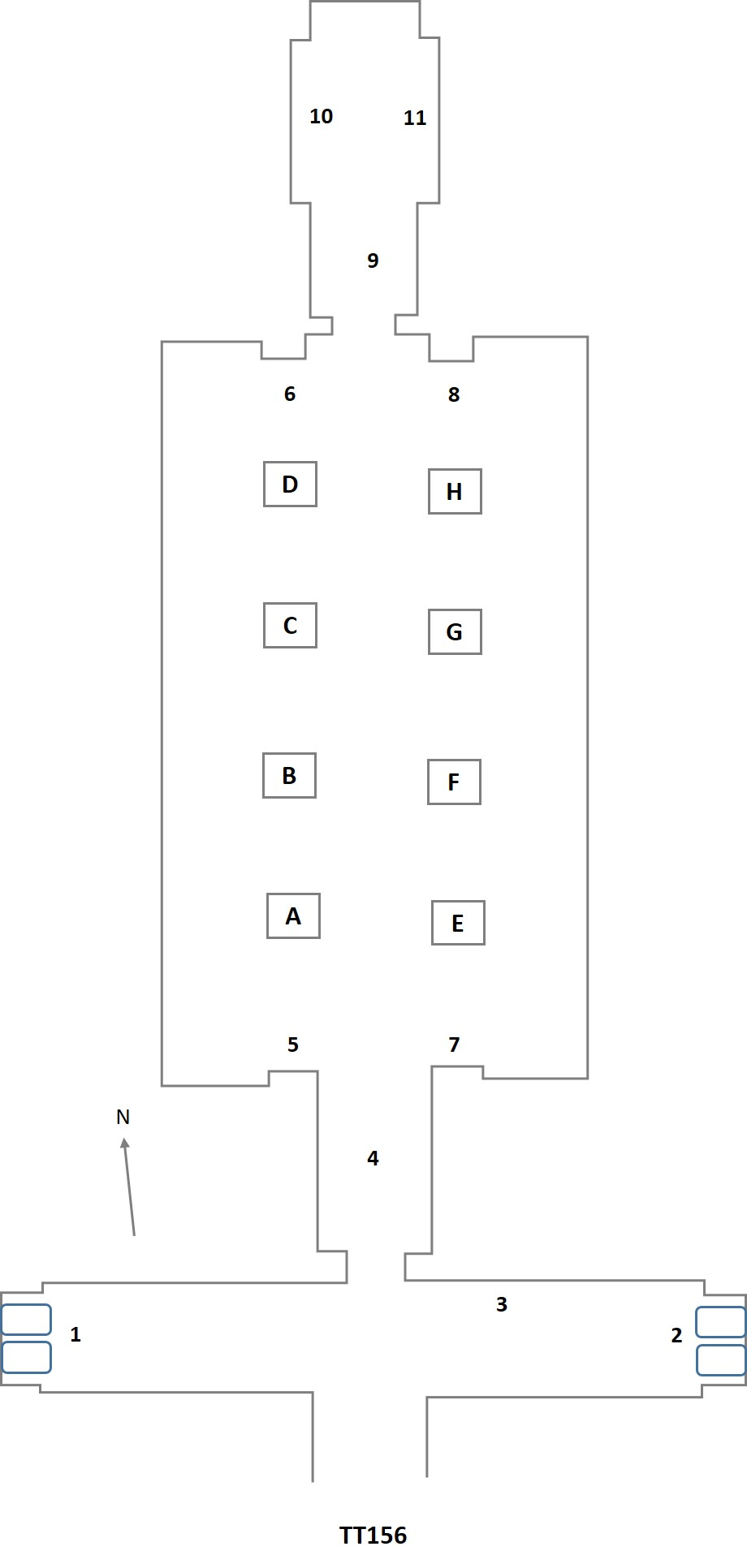

- Location within Egypt
- Location: Dra' Abu el-Naga', Theban Necropolis
- ← Previous; TT155 Next → TT157

p n g g g N19 N21 N21
Pennesuttawy
in hieroglyphs
Era: New Kingdom
(1550–1069 BC)

The Theban Tomb TT156 is located in Dra' Abu el-Naga', part of the Theban Necropolis, on the west bank of the Nile, opposite to Luxor. It is the burial place of the ancient Egyptian Pennesuttawy, who was a troop commander and superintendent of the Southern Desert Lands during the reign of Ramesses II in the Nineteenth Dynasty.

== Tomb ==
The tomb was already known to Champollion. He had given it the number 43.

The tomb consists of a hall, pillared hall, a shrine, and a burial chamber.

- In the hall are seated statues of Pennesuttawy and his wife the chantress of Amun, Maia.
- In the pillared hall Pennesuttawy appears before different gods and goddesses, including Maat, Nut, Re-Harakhti, and Shu.
- On the inner doorway to the shrine Pennesuttawy is shown with his wife Maia, his son the first stablemaster of His Majesty, Nakhtmin, and his daughter named Baketwerner who was a Chantress of Amun.
- The burial chamber is decorated with scenes on the north, east and south wall.

Finds from the tomb include a brick of Pennesuttawy (now in the Philadelphia University Museum). The tomb was later reused during the 21st Dynasty and the 22nd Dynasty.

== See also ==
- List of Theban tombs
