= Pennesuttawy =

Ancient Egyptian military commander, superintendent of Kush

p n g g g N19 N21 N21
- Burial place: TT156 in Thebes
- Relatives: Minhotep (father), Maia (mother)
- Military career
- Allegiance: 19th Dynasty of Egypt (Ramesses II)
- Rank: Military Commander, Superintendent of the Southern Lands

Pennesuttawy was a Military Commander and Superintendent of the Southern Lands (Kush) during the beginning of the Nineteenth Dynasty of Egypt.

== Family ==
Pennesuttawy was the son of Minhotep and Maia. He was a brother of the High Priest of Amun Parennefer who is dated to the reigns of Tutankhamen and Horemheb. Another brother was the High Priest of Min and Isis named Minmose. The three brothers are mentioned in a family monument dedicated by the Chief of Works, Amenemone, who was a son of the High Priest, Parennefer.

Pennesuttawy was married to the chantress of Amun (Amun-Re in Karnak) named Maia. They had at least two children:

- n D40 R22 R12 Nakhtmin was the first Stablemaster of the Pharaoh and later Troop Commander.
- G29 k t wr r n Z2 r Z2 B1 Baketwerner, a chantress of Amun.

== Monuments ==
- Pennesuttawy is known from his tomb (TT156) in Thebes, Egypt. Inscriptions give his titles as the Troop Commander and Superintendent of the Southern Desert-lands.
- He is shown in an inscription from Buhen, where he is shown giving praise before Ramesses II.
- Pennesuttawy appears as part of the extended family of the Chief of Works, Amenemone. He is listed as the paternal uncle of Amenemone and he is mentioned alongside his brother Minmose.
