= Anhurmose =

Anhurmose was an ancient Egyptian official of the New Kingdom. He was the high priest of Anhur under Merenptah, but started his career as a military man, most likely under king Ramesses II (reigned about 1279–1213 BC).

Anhurmose is mainly known from his tomb at El Mashayikh Lepidotonpolis, near Abydos. The tomb chapel is fully decorated and contains a long biographical inscription. According to this inscription he started his career on a ship, albeit it is not entirely clear what his exact position was there. Later he served in the army and was part of military campaigns. He was scribe of the army and chariotry. The inscription does not mention a king. However, it seems likely that the service in the army was under king Ramesses II, as the second part of career happened under Merenptah. The latter reigned only for about 10 years. The biography states further more that Anhurmose was chosen by god Shu to become high priest of Maat. It remains uncertain what chose by Shu means, perhaps the king appointed him. From other inscriptions in the tomb it is known that his highest position was high priest of Anhur.

Two wives are named in the tomb: Tawerthetepet and Sekhmetnefret. Two sons are mentioned, they are called Pennub, who was stablemaster and Hui, who was priest of Anhur. The parents of Anhurmose were a woman called Iemweni and a man called Pennub, who was scribe of the recruits of the Lord of the Two Lands.
