= Ptahmose (vizier) =

Egyptian high priest and vizier

- High Priest of Amun, Vizier of the South
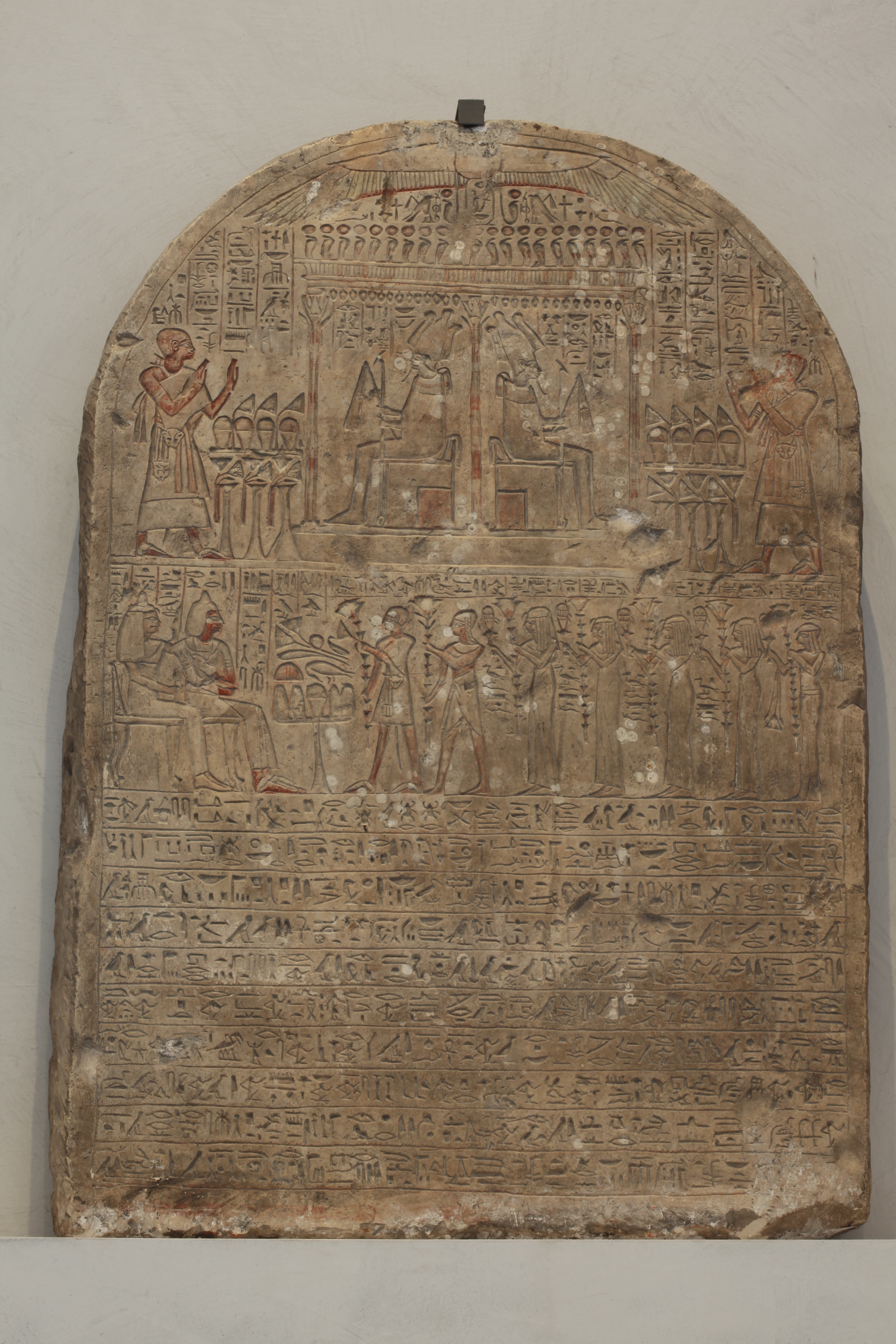
- The stela of Ptahmose.
Egyptian name
p t H ms S29 A1
- Successor: Ramose
- Dynasty: 18th Dynasty
- Pharaoh: Amenhotep III
- Burial: Thebes
- Spouse: Apeny
- Children: Thutmose (chief prophet of Horus) and Houy; Nefertari, Mutemwia, Hemetnetjer, Mutnofret and a second Nefertari

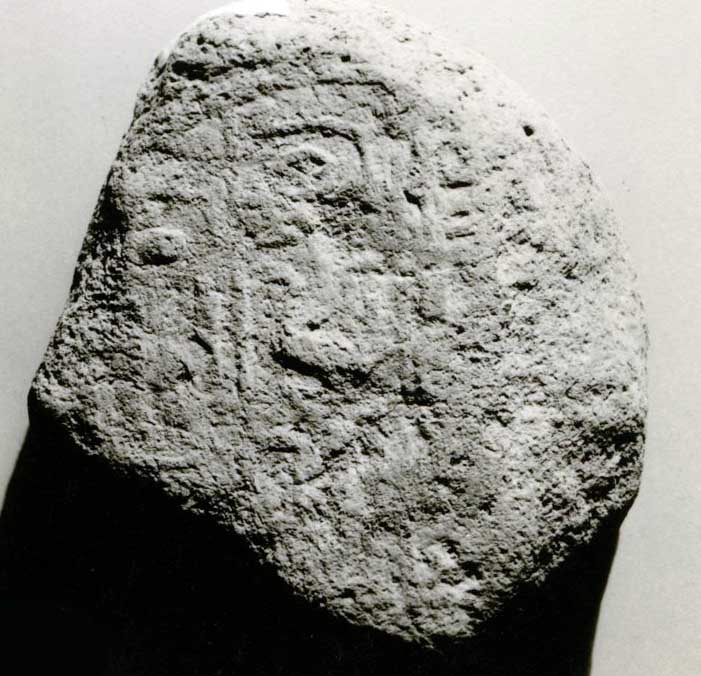
Funerary Cone of the Vizier Ptahmose

Ptahmose was a High Priest of Amun and Vizier of southern Egypt-(Upper Egypt), under Amenhotep III (18th Dynasty). Certain historians place him at the end of the reign in 1378 BC. Others place him in the first part of the reign.

== Life ==
He was succeeded as vizier in the south by Ramose, and several documents in Ptahmose's name are spread among the world's main Egyptological collections dating him at the latest to 28–30 years after Amenhotep III's reign.

A stela at the Museum of Fine Arts of Lyon allows us to better know this man who – in a rare instance – combined the offices of Vizier, Mayor of Thebes, and High Priest of Amon. The stela's provenance is not indicated by the museum's archives, though it was probably deposited by Ptahmose's family ex voto at Abydos. It dates him to Amenhotep III's reign, since that pharaoh's cartouche appears on it. Its text is effectively made up of classic laudatory formulae addressed to Osiris as well as prayers that Ptahmose may profit from the offerings made to the god in his temple, which supports the stela coming from the god's temple rather than Ptahmose's tomb. It was erected after his death, since it calls him justified, a typical term given to the dead. He is shown in the robes of a high priest adoring Osiris and he addresses the reader in a set of classic formulae used by the dead in the form of a negative confession to the god. It mentions the expansion of Ptahmose's tomb at the pharaoh's expense and that it is joined to his funerary monument in the city of eternity, his final place of residence. A long biographical text gives the precise details of his career and in the lower register are shown his 7 children before their parents, in a typical pose for scenes of funerary offerings. It gives their names as Thutmose (chief prophet of Horus), Houy (younger brother, whose titles and offices are not specified), Nefertari, Mutemwia, Hemetnetjer, Mutnofret and a second Nefertari – all five daughters are musicians of Amon. Houy and the second Nefertari were probably still children or adolescents when the stela was put up, explaining why no offices are given for him and the representation of her as a young girl. The stela also tells us that Ptahmose's wife was called Apeny and was still alive when the stela was put up (since her name and titles are not followed by the qualifiers reserved for the dead mentioned above).

== Burial ==
Ptahmose was likely buried in Thebes. Funerary cones of the First Prophet of Amun Ptahmose are in the collection of the Metropolitan Museum.
