= Geraldine Harris =

British egyptologist

Geraldine Harris (born 1951), sometimes credited as Geraldine Harris Pinch, is an English author and Egyptologist. (Note: She uses her married name, Pinch, for academic Egyptology publications and her maiden name, Harris, for material written for children.) She is a member of the Faculty of Asian and Middle Eastern Studies at the University of Oxford.

Her works include the Seven Citadels quartet and numerous information text books about Egypt.

== Partial bibliography ==
- White Cranes Castle, illustrated by Lisa Jensen, Macmillan (London), 1979.
- "Seven Citadels" series
  - Prince of the Godborn, Greenwillow (New York City), 1982.
  - The Children of the Wind, Greenwillow, 1982.
  - The Dead Kingdom, Greenwillow, 1983.
  - The Seventh Gate, Greenwillow, 1983.
- Gods and Pharaohs from Egyptian Mythology, illustrated by John Sibbick and David O'Connor, Lowe (London), 1982, Schocken (New York City), 1983, reprinted, P. Bedrick (New York City), 1996.
- The Junior Atlas of Ancient Egypt, Lionheart (London), 1989.
- New Kingdom Votive Offerings to Hathor, Griffith Institute (Oxford), 1989.
- Isis and Osiris, NTC Pub. Group, 1996.
- (Co-authored with Delia Pemberton) Illustrated Encyclopedia of Ancient Egypt, Peter Bedrick Books, 1999.
- Egyptian Mythology: A Guide to the Gods, Goddesses, and Traditions of ancient Egypt. Oxford University Press, 2004. ISBN 0-19-517024-5
- Contributor to journals, including Folklore and Orientalia.
