= Onuris =

Ancient Egyptian god of war

- Onuris was depicted wearing a headdress of two or four tall feathers.
Name in hieroglyphs
W25 N35 D2 D21 X1 N31 G7
or
W25 N31 N1 G7
- Major cult center: Thinis
- Symbol: ostrich plumes, lion, spear

Genealogy
- Parents: Ra
- Siblings: Tefnut, Shu, Bastet
- Consort: Mehit

Equivalents
- Greek: Ares

In Ancient Egyptian mythology, Onuris (Ancient Egyptian: jn-ḥrt, lit. 'one who carries the sky', Coptic: ⲁⲛϩⲟⲩⲣⲉ), also known as Onouris, Anhur, Anhuret, Han-Her, Inhert, was a war god who was worshipped in the Egyptian area of Abydos, and particularly in Thinis. Myths told that he had brought his wife, Mehit, who was his female counterpart, from Nubia, and his name reflects this—it means '(one who) leads back the distant one'.

One of his titles was slayer of enemies. Onuris was depicted as a bearded man wearing a robe and a headdress with four feathers, holding a spear or lance, or occasionally as a lion-headed god (representing strength and power). In some depictions, the robe was more similar to a kilt.

== Roles ==
=== God of war ===
Due to his position as a war god, he was patron of the ancient Egyptian army, and the personification of royal warriors. Indeed, at festivals honoring him, mock battles were staged. During the Roman era the Emperor Tiberius was depicted on the walls of Egyptian temples wearing the distinctive four-plumed crown of Onuris.

The Greeks equated Onuris to their god of war, Ares. In the legend of Olympian gods fleeing from Typhon and taking animal form in Egypt, Ares was said to have taken the form of a fish as Lepidotus or Onuris.

=== Sky bearer ===
Onuris name also could mean 'sky bearer' and, due to the shared headdress, Onuris was later identified with Shu, becoming Onuris-Shu. He is the son of Ra and brother of Tefnut if identified as Shu.

== High priests of Onuris ==
- Amenhotep, from the time of Thutmose IV. Amenhotep's wife Henut was a singer of Onuris. Their sons Hat and Kenna were Chariot Warriors of His Majesty. Known from a stela now in the British Museum (EA 902).
- Nebwenenef High Priest of Onuris during the reign of Seti I. Was appointed High Priest of Amun in the beginning of the reign of Ramesses II.
- Hori
- Minmose, son of the High Priest of Onuris Hori and his wife Inty. From the reign of Ramesses II.
- Anhurmose, from the time of Merneptah.
- Sishepset, from the time of Ramesses III
- Harsiese, mentioned on an ostracon in Abydos

== In popular culture ==
Onuris is a playable character in the multiplayer online battle arena, SMITE. Onuris is a Hunter wielding a spear and bears the title the Slayer of Enemies and is shown in his (anthropomorphic) lion form maintaining his beard, robe, and a crown incorporating four large feathers.

Onuris is a chaotic god in the computer game NetHack/Slash'EM.

Onuris has a minor role in the 2012 fantasy novel The Serpent's Shadow as a presumed dead god who is revived in order to destroy the Lord of Chaos, Apophis.

Onuris is one of the 20 bosses you fight in the video game Boss Rush: Mythology.

The American death metal band Nile did two tracks about Onuris in their 2000 album Black Seeds of Vengeance, called "Masturbating the War God" and "Libation Unto the Shades Who Lurk In the Shadows of the Temple of Anhur".
