= Tjauti =

Ancient Egyptian official

- Nomarch of the 5th nome of Upper Egypt
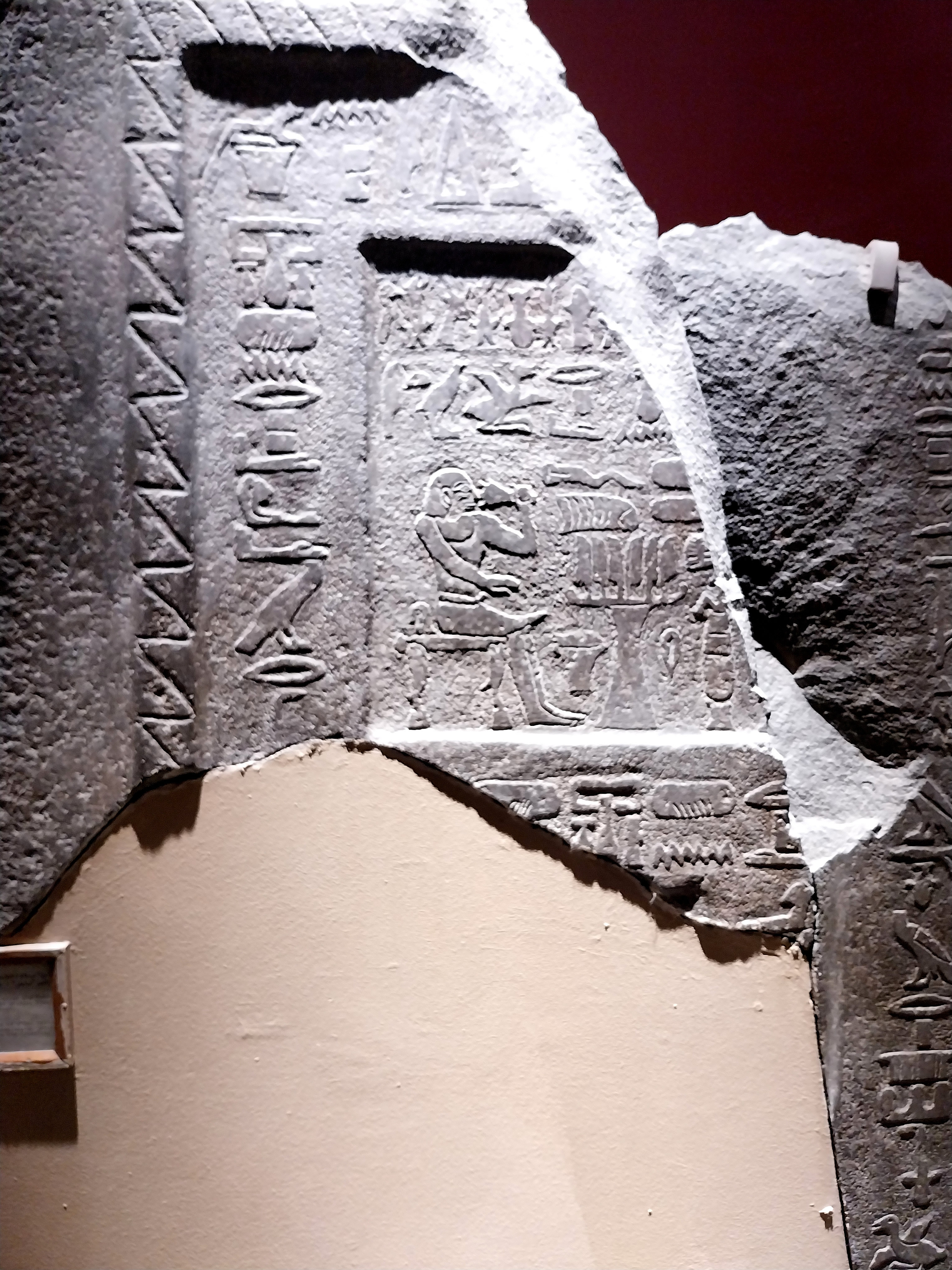
- False door of Tjauti
- Dynasty: 8th dynasty

Tjauti was an ancient Egyptian official who lived at the end of the Eighth Dynasty. He is known from a number of sources providing evidence that he was a nomarch of the Coptic Nome in Upper Egypt. However, the sources are often broken and the figure of Tjauti remains therefore enigmatic.

The most important objects naming Tjauti are the fragments of a false door found near Khozam (compare: Iushenshen) where he is called overseer of Upper Egypt, which was one of the most important titles in the Old Kingdom. He is also called the one who fills the heart of the king showing some close connection to the royal court. A person called Tjauti-iqer also appears in several inscriptions in the Wadi Hammamat, reporting the transport of stones: Tjauti-iqer seems to be a variant of the name. The inscriptions also mentions the god's father Idy, who was the son of Shemay. Shemay lived at the end of the Eighth Dynasty providing also a date for Tjauti to about the same period.

== Gebel Tjaut inscription ==
A further inscription was found at the rock today called Gebel Tjauti (the rock is named after Tjauti) which is today much destroyed, but gave rise for some speculation as some fights seem to be mentioned. The inscription seems to report the opening of a road. Close to this inscription was found another one naming a king Intef and the assault of soldiers. The publication of the inscription sees a connection between these two inscriptions and identifies Intef, with Intef I.
