= Neferkaure =

Egyptian pharaoh

- Neferkawre, Kha[bau?]
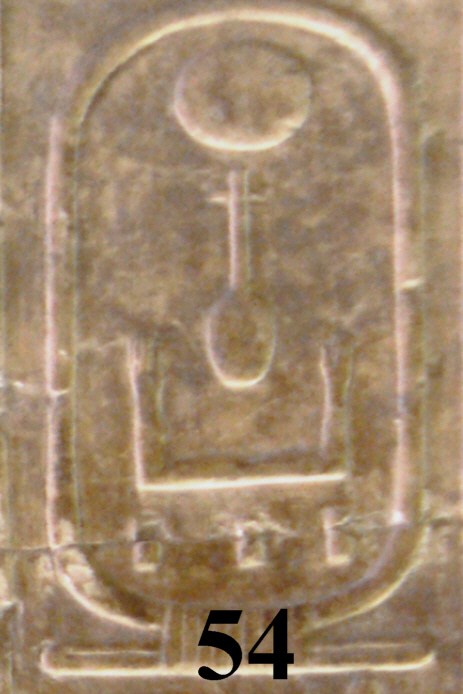
- The cartouche of Neferkaure on the Abydos King List

Pharaoh
- Reign: Around 4 years and 2 months, c. 2167 – c. 2163 BC
- Predecessor: Qakare Ibi
- Successor: Possibly Khuwihapi
Royal titulary
Horus name
Kha[bau?]
Ḫ3-[...]
Horus, The soul of...
G5	N28 HASH
Prenomen
Neferkaure
Nfr k3.w Rˁ
Perfect are the Kas of Ra

M23 X1 L2 X1	N5 nfr D28 Z2
- Died: c. 2163 BC
- Dynasty: 8th Dynasty

Neferkaure (died c. 2163 BC) was a king of ancient Egypt during the First Intermediate Period. According to the Abydos King List and the latest reconstruction of the Turin canon by Kim Ryholt, he was the 15th king of the Eighth Dynasty. This opinion is shared by the Egyptologists Jürgen Beckerath, Thomas Schneider, and Darell Baker. As a king of the Eighth Dynasty, Neferkaure's seat of power was Memphis and he may not have held power over all of Egypt.

== Attestations ==
Neferkaure is named on the 54th entry of the Abydos King List, a king list redacted some 900 years after the First Intermediate Period during the reign of Seti I. Neferkaure's name is lost in a lacuna of the Turin canon affecting column 5, line 11 of the document. The length of Neferkaure's reign is nonetheless preserved with "4 years and 2 months".

Neferkaure is also known from a contemporary inscription, a fragmentary decree inscribed on a limestone slab known as Coptos Decree h and concerning offerings for the temple of Min at Coptos. One of the two existing fragments of this decree was given by Edward Harkness to the Metropolitan Museum of Art, where it is now on display in Gallery 103. The decree is dated to the fourth regnal year of Neferkaure, which is the highest attested date of any king of the Eighth Dynasty. The first sign of the king's Horus name is clearly present while the second sign is debated. von Beckerath commits only to the first sign and reads Kha[...], while Baker and William C. Hayes read Khabau. The decree is addressed to the then governor of Upper Egypt, Shemay, and requires that fixed amounts of offerings be given at regular intervals to the god Min and then possibly to a statue of the king.

Preceded by Possibly Ibi	King of Egypt c. 2167 – c. 2163 BC	Succeeded by Possibly Khuwihapi
