= Coptos Decrees =

Group of ancient Egyptian royal decrees

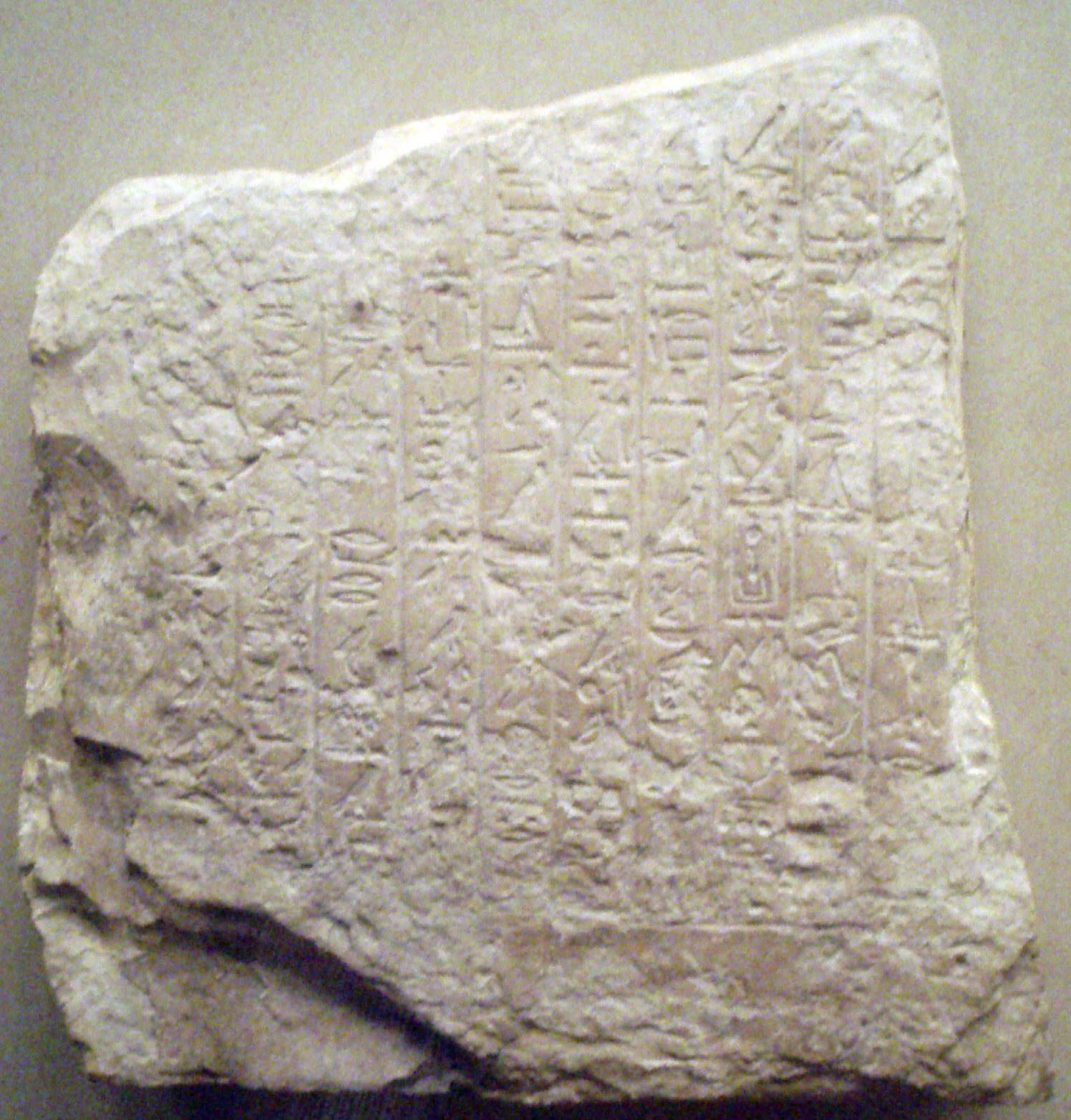
Fragment of the Decree d, issued by Pepi II, now at the Metropolitan Museum of Art

The Coptos Decrees are 18 complete or fragmentary ancient Egyptian royal decrees ranging from the 6th Dynasty (2345–2180 BC) to the late 8th Dynasty (c. 2170 BC). The decrees are numbered with letters of the Latin alphabet, starting with "Coptos Decree a" and ending with "Coptos Decree r". The earliest of the series were issued by Pepi I and Pepi II Neferkare to favor the clergy of the temple of Min, while the others are datable to the reign of various kings of the 8th Dynasty, and concern various favors granted to an important official from Coptos named Shemay and to his family members. The decrees reflect the waning of the power of the pharaoh in the early First Intermediate Period.

The Coptos decrees should not be confused with the Coptos Decree of Nubkheperre Intef, a unique document datable to the much later 17th Dynasty.

== Discovery and original location ==
Ten of the decrees were discovered during the 1910–1911 excavations of the temple of Min at Coptos by Adolphe Reinach and Raymond Weill, working for the Société française des fouilles archéologiques. The decrees had been carefully stowed under the ruins of a Roman mudbrick structure. The remaining decrees originate either from the same excavations or from illegal operations by local people that were sold in Luxor in 1914 to the Metropolitan Museum of Art.

The decrees are inscribed on limestone slabs 7–20 cm (2.8–7.9 in) thick, 100–200 cm (39–79 in) long and 50–180 cm (20–71 in) high which were intended to be set in the mudbrick wall of a gateway or vestibule inside the temple of Min. As time passed, the space available on the temple walls diminished and the Coptos decrees were dismounted and put away to make space for newer decrees which explains their find spot.

== Political implications ==
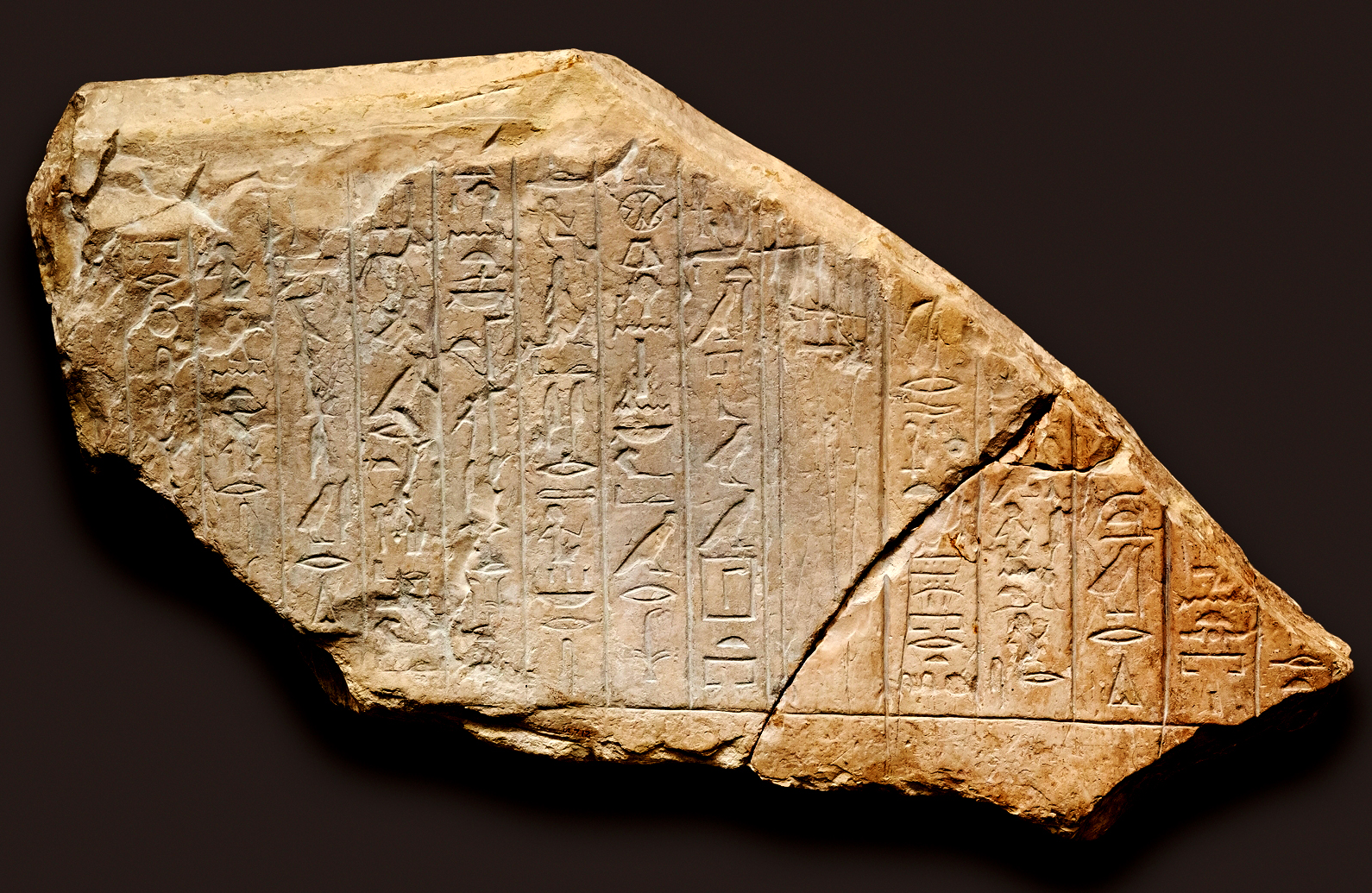
Fragments of Coptos decrees p and q dating to the reign of Neferkauhor, end of the Eighth Dynasty.

=== Decline of the Old Kingdom ===
The decrees are symptomatic of the powers held by the nomarchs at the very end of the Old Kingdom and beginning of the First Intermediate Period. Decrees g to r are addressed to Shemay, his son Idy and one of Idy's brothers. Shemay, already the nomarch of Coptos, is promoted first to governor of Upper Egypt and then to vizier of Upper Egypt, while his son Idy takes his place after him.

Alan H. Gardiner and William C. Hayes find decree r particularly remarkable because, while it is emitted by the pharaoh, the decree is solely concerned with the welfare and properties of the vizier Idy. For Hayes this reflects the fact that at the end of the 8th Dynasty, royal power had diminished so much that it owed its survival to puissant nomarchs, upon whom it could only bestow titles and honours. The nomarch of Coptos would have been particularly cherished by the Memphite rulers who were threatened by the nomarchs of Middle Egypt, especially those of Herakleopolis, who would soon overthrow them and found the 9th Dynasty.

=== Coptos Dynasty ===
The discovery of the decrees was initially considered by Kurt Sethe to support the hypothesis of the existence of a "Dynasty of Coptos", a local lineage of more or less independent rulers during the First Intermediate Period, to be identified with the issuers of the decrees subsequent to the 6th Dynasty. This hypothesis is nowadays considered implausible as was shown by Hayes and others, in particular it is highly unlikely that a king reigning from Coptos would appoint a vizier over the same area.

== Complete list ==
The following complete list is based on William C. Hayes's 1946 publication "Royal decrees from the temple of Min at Coptus":

Coptos Decrees
| Name | Author | Subject | Addressed to |
|---|---|---|---|
| a | Pepi I | Granting tax immunity to the Ka-chapel of his mother Iput | |
| b | Pepi II | Granting tax immunity to the temple of Min | |
| c | Pepi II | Granting tax immunity to the temple of Min | |
| d | Pepi II | Granting tax immunity to the institution 'Min-causes-the-foundation-of-Neferkare-to-flourish' | |
| e | Pepi II | Dealing with the personnel and possessions of a temple in the 22nd nome of Upper Egypt | |
| f | Unknown 6th Dynasty king | Uncertain, mentions Upper Egypt | |
| g | Unknown 7th/8th Dynasty king, commonly identified with Neferkaure | Upkeeping a statue of Pepi II and the institution 'Min-causes-the-foundation-of-Neferkare-to-flourish' | Governor of Upper Egypt Shemay and possibly his son Idy |
| h | Neferkaure | Specifying the offerings and services to be made in the temple of Min | Shemay |
| i | Unknown 7th/8th Dynasty king commonly identified with Neferkaure | Putting Shemay in charge of 22 nomes in Upper-Egypt | Shemay (vizier from now) |
| j | Neferkauhor | Granting titles to Shemay's wife Nebyet as well as a personal bodyguard | Shemay |
| k | Neferkauhor | Assigning mortuary-priests for the Ka-chapels of Shemay and Nebyet | Shemay |
| l | Neferkauhor | Ordering an inventory of the properties of the institution 'Min-causes-the-foundation-of-Neferkare-to-flourish' under the supervision of Shemay | Shemay |
| m | Neferkauhor | Putting Shemay's son Idy in charge of the seven southernmost nomes of Upper-Egypt | Shemay |
| n | Neferkauhor | Giving a brother of Idy and son of Shemay a post in the temple of Min | Shemay |
| o | Neferkauhor | Making Shemay's son Idy the Governor of the seven southernmost nomes of Upper-Egypt | Governor of Upper Egypt Idy |
| p | Neferkauhor | Informing Idy of the appointment of his brother in the temple of Min | Idy |
| q | Neferkauhor | Informing Shemay's son, brother of Idy, of his appointment to the temple of Min | Shemay's son, brother of Idy |
| r | Horus Demedjibtawy, likely Neferirkare II | Protecting Idy's funerary monuments and properties | Idy (now vizier) |

== Literature ==
- William C. Hayes: The Scepter of Egypt: A Background for the Study of the Egyptian Antiquities in The Metropolitan Museum of Art. Vol. 1, From the Earliest Times to the End of the Middle Kingdom , MetPublications, 1978, pp. 136–138, available online
- Hans Goedicke, Koptosdekrete. In: Wolfgang Helck (ed.), Lexikon der Ägyptologie, Band III, Harrassowitz, Wiesbaden 1980, ISBN 3-447-02100-4, p. 740.
