= Minemhat =

Ancient Egyptian mayor of Koptos

Minemhat (Min is at the front; Franke PD251) was an Ancient Egyptian mayor of Koptos during the 17th Dynasty in the late Second Intermediate Period. Minemhat appears in three sources and served during the reign of Nubkheperre Intef.

== Attestations ==
=== Royal Decree of Nubkheperre Intef ===
Minemhat appears on the Coptos Decree dates to Year 3 of King Nubkheperre Intef. This is a royal decree addressed to certain officials at Koptos with Minemhat appearing as the first one with the titles royal sealer and mayor of Koptos. The decree is about the removal of Teti, Son of Minhotep, from his position in the temple at Koptos.

- Cairo JE 30770 bis with the title string Royal Sealer, Governor of Koptos, Overseer of a Half-Domain, Minemhat (ḫtmw-bjtj; ḥꜣtj-ꜥ n gbtjw; jmj-rꜣ gs-pr mnw-m-ḥꜣt).

=== Gebel Zeit, Mining Expedition ===
At Gebel Zeit, several mining expeditions went to the galena mines, often departing from Coptos (Quft). There is evidence of Min worship indicating a relation to the Temple of Min at Coptos. The stela erected by Minemhat, a nomarch of Coptos, indicating his participation in a mining expedition during the 17th Dynasty.

- Gebel Zeit 549 with titlestring Royal Sealer, Governor of Koptos Minemhat (ḫtmw-bjtj; ḥꜣtj-ꜥ n gbtjw mnw-m-ḥꜣt).

=== Tomb of Hornakht ===
Minemhat appears on a box in the burial of Royal Acquaintance Hornakht, showing that he had links to officials at Thebes. Other items in the burial of Hornakht also mentions governor Sobeknakht of Elkab and king Djehuty-aa.

- Cairo JE 21472 with title string Governor Minemhat (ḥꜣtj-ꜥ mnw-m-ḥꜣt).
