= Neferirkare =

Egyptian pharaoh

- Neferirkare II
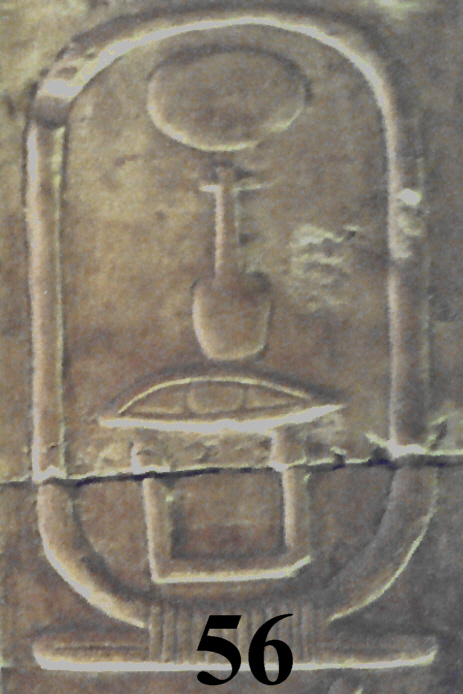
- The cartouche of Neferirkare on the Abydos King List

Pharaoh
- Reign: Around 1 year and 6 months, c. 2161 – c. 2160 BC
- Predecessor: Possibly Khuwihapi
- Successor: Possibly Khety I
Royal titulary
Horus name
Demedjibtawy (uncertain)
Dmḏ-ib-t3wy
Horus, He who unifies the heart of the two lands
G5	S23 ib N19
Prenomen
Neferirkare
Nfr-jrj k3 Rˁ
What the Ka of Ra does is perfect

M23 X1 L2 X1	N5 nfr ir D28
Nomen
Pepi

G39 N5	p p i i
- Died: c. 2160 BC
- Dynasty: 8th Dynasty

Neferirkare Pepi III (sometimes referred to as Neferirkare II because of Neferirkare Kakai; died c. 2160 BC) was an ancient Egyptian king of the Eighth Dynasty during the early First Intermediate Period (2181–2055 BC). According to egyptologists Kim Ryholt, Jürgen Beckerath, and Darrell Baker, he was the 17th and final king of the Eighth Dynasty. Many scholars consider Neferirkare to have been the last king of the Old Kingdom, which came to an end with the 8th Dynasty.

== Attestations ==
Neferirkare II's name is clearly attested on the 56th entry of the Abydos King List, a king list which was redacted some 900 years after the First Intermediate Period during the reign of Seti I. The latest reconstruction of the Turin canon, another king list compiled in the Ramesside era, indicates that Neferirkare II is also attested there on column 5, line 13.

== Identity ==
Farouk Gomaà, William Hayes, and Baker identify Neferirkare II with the horus name Demedjibtawy (Dmḏ-ib-t3wy, "He who unifies the heart of the two lands") appearing on a single decree, the Coptos Decree R, now in the Egyptian Museum, JE 41894. The decree concerns the temple of Min at Coptos, exempting it from dues and duties. This identification is rejected by Jürgen von Beckerath.

Another proposed identification concerns the prenomen Wadjkare (W3ḏ-k3-Rˁ, "Flourishing is the Ka of Ra"), which also appears on the Coptos Decree R. Kurt Sethe, Gomaà, Hayes, and Baker see Wadjkare as distinct from Demedjibtawy, but von Beckerath believes that Wadjkare may have been the prenomen of Neferkare II and the same person as Demedjibtawy. At the opposite, Gomaà and Hayes equate Wadjkare with an obscure ruler named Hor-Khabaw. Alternatively, Hans Goedicke proposed that Wadjkare is the predecessor of Demedjibtawy and places both rulers chronologically into the 9th Dynasty. Thomas Schneider leaves the problem open and relates Wadjkare equally to either Neferkare II or Neferirkare II without further reference to Demedjibtawy.

Finally, both Demedjibtawy and Wadjkare are not known from any other contemporary attestation than the decree and, unless they are to be identified with Neferirkare II or Neferkare II, they are also absent from both the Abydos king list and the Turin canon.

In 2014, Maha Farid Mostafa published an inscription, found in the tomb of Shemay. The inscription belongs most likely to Idy, a son of Shemay, albeit Idy's name is not preserved. The text is dated under a king with the name Pepi and with a throne name Nefer-ka [destroyed]-Ra. Maha Farid Mostafa reconstructed that throne name to Neferirkare. The inscription dates for sure to the 8th Dynasty. If this reconstruction is correct, Neferirkare is most likely identical with Demedjibtawy. Idy is mentioned on one of the Coptos decrees together with Demedjibtawy.

== Reign ==
The Turin canon credits Neferirkare II with a year and half of reign. Both the Turin canon and the Abydos king list record Neferirkare II as the last ruler of the combined 7th/8th. Neferirkare was possibly overthrown by the first king of the succeeding Herakleopolitan 9th Dynasty, Meryibre Khety. Alternatively the Egyptian state may have completely collapsed with the onset of low Nile floods, mass famine and chaos which engulfed Egypt at the start of the First Intermediate Period.
