= Wadjkare =

Egyptian Pharaoh

Pharaoh
- Reign: c. 2150 BC
- Predecessor: Possibly Qakare Ibi
- Successor: Possibly Wahkare Khety I
Royal titulary
Horus name
Djemed-ib-tawy
Dmḏ-jb-t3wj
He who unifies the heart of the two lands
G5	Aa6 F34 N18 N18
Prenomen
Wadj-ka-Re
W3ḏ-k3-Rˁ
The Ka of Rê is refreshed

M23 X1 L2 X1	N5 M13 D28
- Dynasty: 8th Dynasty

Wadjkare (fl. c. 2150 BC) may have been an ancient Egyptian king of the Eighth dynasty who reigned during the First Intermediate Period. He is considered to be a very obscure figure in Egyptian history.

== Identity ==
Wadjkare is mentioned only once: in a royal limestone tablet known as Coptos Decree R (Cairo museum; obj. JE 41894), which is said to have been created by the king himself. It contains a list of punishments for everyone who dares to damage or plunder a shrine dedicated to the god Min-of-Coptos. However, from an archaeological standpoint there is nothing else known about this king. His existence is questioned by some scholars, because he is not mentioned in any Ramesside king list.

A rock inscription in Nubia mentions a king that in the past was tentatively read as Wadjkare. It is believed nowadays that the royal name on the inscription is Menkhkare, the throne name of the 11th Dynasty local ruler Segerseni.

Scholars such as Farouk Gomaà and William Hayes identify the Horus name Djemed-ib-taui with a ruler named Neferirkare and equate Wadjkare with an obscure ruler named Hor-Khabaw. Hans Goedicke sees Wadjkare as the predecessor of Djemed-ib-taui and assigns both rulers to the 9th dynasty.
