= User (nomarch) =

Ancient Egyptian nomarch

- Nomarch of the 5th nome of Upper Egypt
- Dynasty: 8th Dynasty

User was an ancient Egyptian nomarch (governor) of the Eighth Dynasty. User is mainly known from a false door found at Khozam (ancient Iushenshen) in 1884. The monument is about one meter high and is made of greywacke. It is today in the Egyptian Museum in Cairo. Here, User bears a long string of important titles, such as Father of the god, beloved of the god, Overseer of Upper Egypt, overseer of the desert lands and overlord of the Coptite nome. The latter title is the main title for nomarchs in the late Old Kingdom and First Intermediate Period. Furthermore, he was overseer of priests and overseer of the Eastern and Western Deserts. The most unusual title for a nomarch is king's eldest son of his body.

The date of User was for a long time under discussion. However, he also appears in the tomb of Shemay at Coptos. There is depicted the transport of a stone from Elephantine. Under the scene is another one that is destroyed, only the caption is preserved naming User with several title, including eldest king's son. Shemay was in office at the end of the Eight Dynasty. Evidently User lived in the same period.

The title king's eldest son of his body caused some discussion in Egyptology, as it is not certain whether he was a real son of a king or whether the title was purely honorific.

== Bibliography ==
- Mostafa, Maha Farid (2014). The Mastaba of SmAj at Naga' Kom el-Koffar, Qift, volume I. Cairo. ISBN 978-977-6420-04-5.
