= Iushenshen =

- Town
- Location within Egypt
- Coordinates: 25°47′03″N 32°46′00″E
- Country: Ancient Egypt
- Nome: Nomos of Harawî

N18 Z1 V7 N35 V7 N35 O49
jwšnšn
in hieroglyphs
Era: 1st Intermediate Period
(2181–2055 BC)

Iushenshen was an ancient Egyptian town in the Coptic nome in Upper Egypt. It is a few times mentioned in Ancient Egyptian sources. According to the Ramesside Onomastica the place was located south of Coptos. 25 km (16 miles) south of Coptos there is the modern town called Khozam where ancient monuments have been found, and it seems possible that Khozam was ancient Iushenshen. Near Khozam were excavated several cemeteries with some of them dating back to the Badarian Period (about 4000 BC). Near Khozam the false door of the local governor User and the false door of the overseer of Upper Egypt Tjauti were also found, they date to the very end of the Old Kingdom. These high officials were evidently buried here and it seems that the capital of the Coptite nome moved at the end of the Old Kingdom to this place. Iushenshen was destroyed in the First Intermediate Period. A stela of a certain Khenmes reports that he was sent to the town and rebuilt it.

== See also ==
- List of ancient Egyptian towns and cities
