= Shemay =

Ancient Egyptian vizier

- Vizier of Egypt; Nomarch of the 5th nome of Upper Egypt
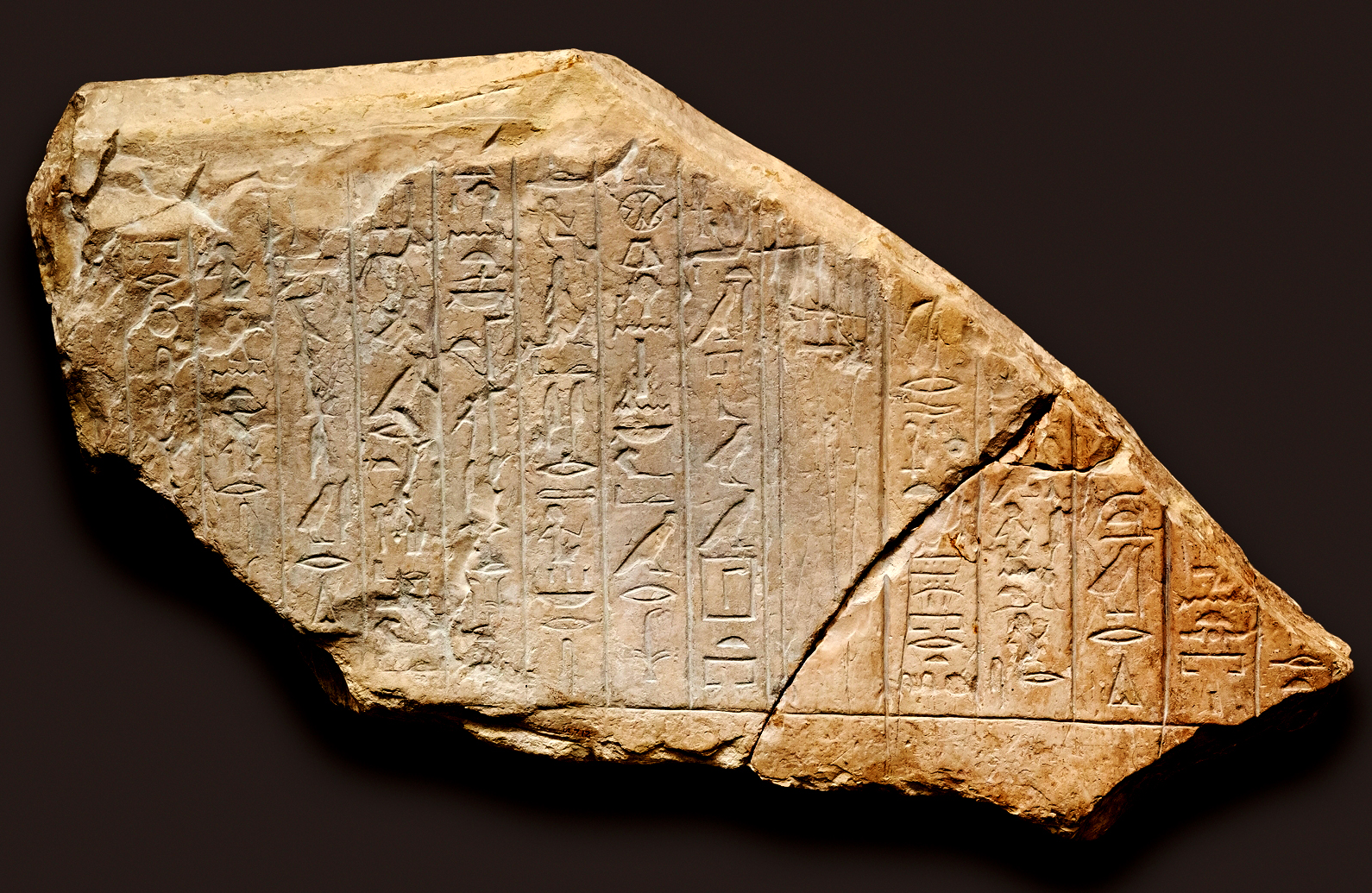
- Reunited Coptos decrees “p” and “q”, addressed to Shemay's two sons. Metropolitan Museum of Art, New York (Acc. No. 14.7.12)
Egyptian name
N37 U1 A4 iŠm3y
- Successor: Idy
- Dynasty: 8th Dynasty
- Pharaoh: Neferkaure, Neferkauhor
- Burial: Mastaba at Kom el-Koffar
- Spouse: Nebyet
- Children: Idy unnamed son

Shemay (also Shemai) was an ancient Egyptian official and later vizier toward the end of the 8th Dynasty (22nd century BCE) during the First Intermediate Period, mainly known for being the beneficiary of most of the Coptos Decrees. His career has been interpreted as a glaring sign of the extreme weakness of the central power, forced to bestow great privileges to maintain the loyalty of powerful local governors. Shemay is buried in a mudbrick mastaba just south of Coptos.

== Attestations ==
Shemay is known primarily from the Coptos Decrees, a series of decrees by various king of the 8th Dynasty granting titles and honours to him and his family. Shemay is also known from several rock inscriptions in the Wadi Hammamat and from his tomb located just south of Coptos.

== Life ==
=== Career ===
==== Reign of Neferkaure ====
The earliest mention of Shemay came from the three Coptos Decrees “g” to “i” which are generally attributed to pharaoh Neferkaure, and one of these is datable to his Year 4. These documents were displayed in the temple of Min at Coptos and were addressed to the Governor of Upper Egypt Shemay – who had been nomarch of the Two Falcons nome with Coptos as capital – and concerning administrative matters about the cult of pharaoh Pepi II and the temple of Min. The earliest of the three decrees mention the new nomarch of Coptos named Idy who very likely was the same person of Idy, son of Shemay; furthermore, the latest of the three decrees ensured to Shemay the responsibility over the 22 nomes of Upper Egypt.

==== Reign of Neferkauhor ====
Shortly after, king Neferkaure was succeeded by Neferkauhor and Shemay managed to marry his eldest daughter, princess Nebyet; in a single day of his Year 1 (possibly in the same day of his accession to the throne, the "Month 2 of Peret, Day 20") Neferkauhor promulgated 8 of the Coptos Decrees (“j” to “q”), the beneficiary of which was always the newly promoted vizier Shemay as well as various member of his family.

The first decree concerned Nebyet's particular status — as well as Shemay's one, for being the son-in-law of the new pharaoh. Subsequent decrees established other new benefits for Shemay's sons: Idy again filled the vacuum left by his father, occupying the office of Governor of Upper Egypt (although he was responsible only of the 7 southernmost nomes of Upper Egypt) while another son earned a title in the temple of Min. Shemay and Nebyet also gained some privilege that were unprecedented for non-royal people: in fact, some priests were assigned to the funerary cult of their ka, and the couple was allowed to make their own mortuary monuments from royal-exclusively red granite.

It seems that Shemay was already deceased when the last of the Coptos Decrees (“r”) was issued by the Horus Djemedjibtawy, who has been tentatively identified with both Wadjkare and Neferirkare: in fact it was addressed to the vizier Idy, providing evidence that once again the son followed his father's footsteps.

=== Titles ===
In life, he gathered an impressive number of titles and offices, in a decree he is called "...the god's father, beloved of god, king's (foster) child, pyramid-town overseer and vizier, overseer of scribes of the king's document, governor of Upper Egypt, sole companion, chamberlain, herdsman of Hierakonpolis, chief of El Kab, lector priest, overseer of the priest of Min". Further high titles are found in his tomb iry-pat (hereditary prince) and Haty-a (count).

== Tomb ==
=== Excavations ===
Shemay is buried in a tomb 1 km (0.62 mi) south of Coptos on a hill within the flood plain, in modern Kom el-Koffar also known as Kom el-Momanien and Naga el-Kom. The tomb was first excavated in 1956 by Labib Habachi and then from 1979 until 1982 by Rabia Hamdan. More recent excavation works have taken place in 2000 and 2002.

=== Layout ===
The tomb consists of a large mudbrick mastaba with a pillared hall in its center, which is entered from the North side via a forecourt and an 8 m (26 ft) long causeway. All these structures are paved with limestone while the walls of the pillared hall were adorned with offering scenes. A red granite false door is located on the south-east wall of the hall. Several stelae representing Shemay were discovered in niches on the external northern face of the mastaba where offerings to Shemay would possibly have been made.

An inscription on the East wall of the hall is dated to the first year of the reign of Neferkauhor, fourth month of the Shemu season, day 2. This inscription is the sole contemporary attestation of Neferkauhor beyond the Coptos Decrees. The upper register of the wall shows on the left Shemay with his wife. In front of him are workmen dragging a stone. In the middle register is shown the slaughtering of a bull and the dragging of another stone. In this register king Neferkauhor is mentioned twice. The lowest register shows a boat fight in the marshes. Another inscription details what Shemay's son Idy did for his father, giving offerings and ordering repair works in the necropolis.
