= Reinach =

Reinach may refer to:

== Places ==
- Reinach, Aargau (Reinach AG), a municipality in Switzerland
- Reinach, Basel-Landschaft (Reinach BL), a municipality in Switzerland

== People ==
- Adolf Reinach (1883–1917), German philosopher
- Adolphe Reinach (1887–1914), French archaeologist
- Cobus Reinach (born 1990), South African rugby player
- Elna Reinach (born 1968), South African tennis player
- Jacques de Reinach (1840–1892), banker implicated in the Panama scandal
- Joseph Reinach (1856–1921), French author and politician
- Salomon Reinach (1858–1932), French archaeologist and religious historian
- Théodore Reinach (1860–1928), French archaeologist, mathematician, jurist, historian and politician
