= Idy =

Ancient Egyptian high official

- Vizier of Egypt
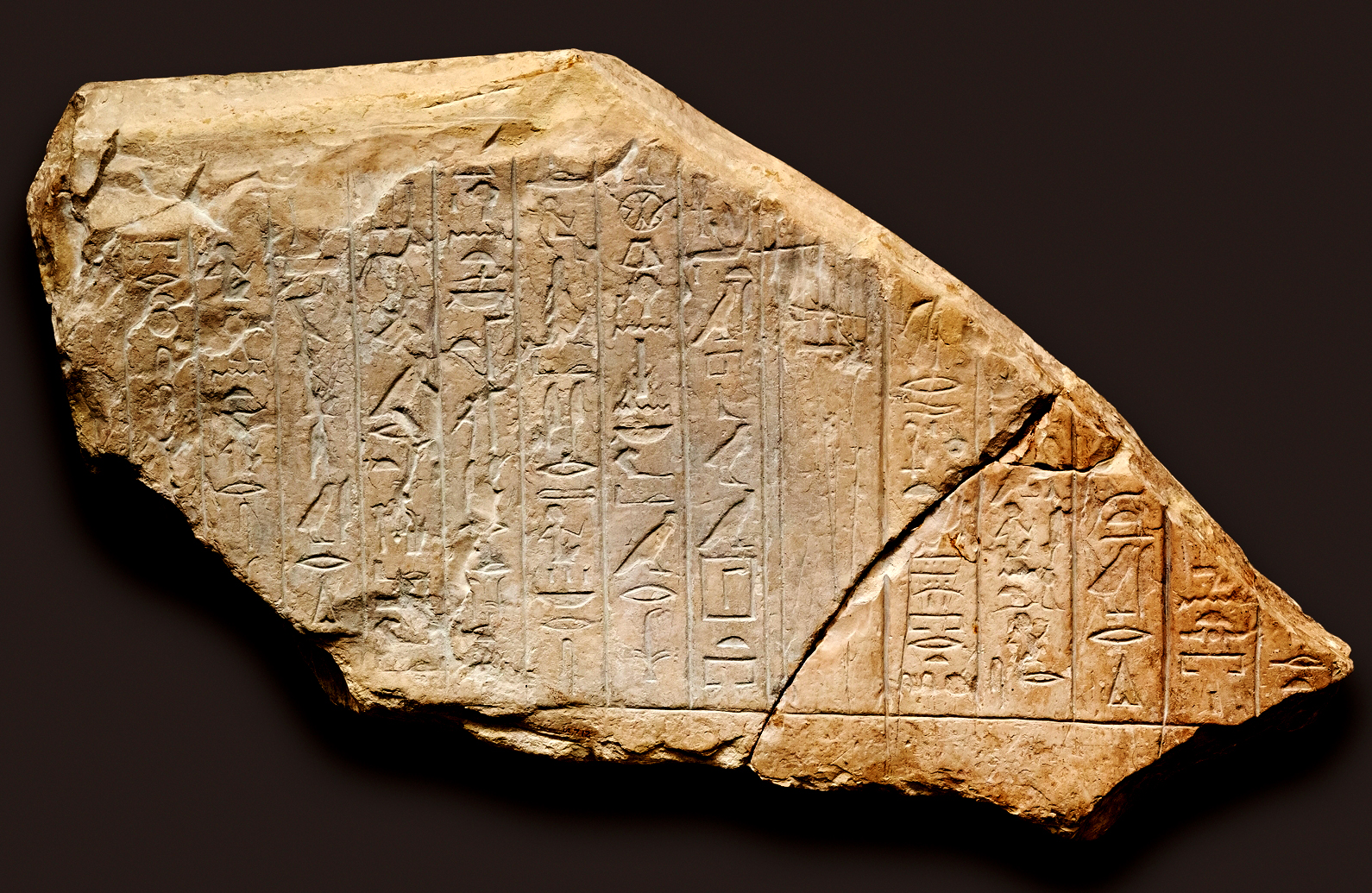
- Reunited Coptos decrees “p” and “q”, addressed to Shemay's two sons. Metropolitan Museum of Art, New York City (Acc. No. 14.7.12).
- Tenure: c. 2160 BC
- Father: Shemay
- Mother: Nebyet

Idy (fl. c. 2260 BC) was an important Ancient Egyptian high official in the Eighth Dynasty known from several sources and served the last kings of the Old Kingdom.

== Family ==
He was the son of vizier and overseer of Upper Egypt, Shemay. His mother was the king's daughter Nebyet, the daughter of king Khuwihapi. Idy was apparently an adult at the time his maternal grandfather became king and his parents received titles.

Their seat of power was the Coptite Nome (5th nome of Upper Egypt) centered on the Temple of Min.

== Attestations ==
At Koptos, he is known from several monuments and the Coptos Decrees, which are a series of royal decrees granting titles to the family and set up at the Temple of Min.

He was a vizier, overseer of Upper Egypt, overseer of priest, and count. The decrees are dated under king Neferkauhor and Neferirkare. One decree (called today Koptos M) is addressed to Shemay and dates under Neferkauhor. It reports the appointment of Idy to the overseer of Upper Egypt. A second one (Koptos Q) mentions affairs in the temple of Min at Koptos. In a third decree (Koptos R), Idy bears the titles of a vizier. In the decree, the king protects the statues and the funerary cult of Idy. The decree is dated under king Neferirkare, who was the successor of Neferkauhor. It seems that Idy took over many positions that his father hold before.

Idy is also known from inscriptions in the tomb of his father Shemay. One inscription reports that Idy found the chapel of his father in ruins and rebuilt it. A second inscription reports that king Pepi III (the latter name is partly destroyed), was sending someone to bring for him a sarcophagus and stones for the father's tomb. The name of Idy is not preserved, but can be reconstructed. The shipping of the sarcophagus is also depicted on one wall in Shemay's tomb. Here is also mentioned the local official and eldest king's son User.

There is also a statue in Brussels (no. E.4355) that might belong to Idy. Here he bears the titles god's father, beloved of the god and hereditary prince (iry-pat). There is also a rock inscription from the Wadi Hammamat that most likely belongs to this Idy. Here he bears the titles royal sealer, sole friend, controller of priests, privy to the secret of the god's treasure. The inscription also mentions the overseer of Upper Egypt Tjauti-iqer and reports the bringing of stones.

== Bibliography ==
- Hayes, William C. (1946). "Royal Decrees from the temple of Min at Coptus". The Journal of Egyptian Archaeology. 32 (1): 3–23. doi:10.1177/030751334603200102. S2CID 192279269.
- Mostafa, Maha Farid (2014). The Mastaba of SmAj at Naga' Kom el-Koffar, Qift, volume I. Cairo. ISBN 978-977-6420-04-5.
- Goedicke, Hans (1967). Königliche Dokuments aus dem Alten Reich. Wiesbaden.
