= Segerseni =

Ancient Egyptian or Nubian chieftain

- Sekherseni
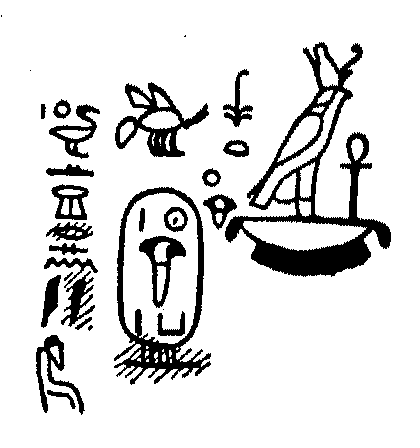
- Drawing of an inscription depicting Segerseni's titulary.

Pharaoh
- Reign: early 20th century BCE
Royal titulary
Horus name
Bik-nebu-ankh
Bjk-nbw-ˁnḫ
Living golden falcon
G5	S34 G8
Prenomen
Menkhkare
Mnḫ-k3-Rˁ
Fresh is the ka of Ra

M23 X1 L2 X1	N5 Z1 U22 D28 Z1
Nomen
Segerseni
Sgrsnj

G39 N5	O34 W11 r O34 n i i A50
- Dynasty: king of Nubia, concurrent with 11th–12th Dynasty

Segerseni was an ancient Egyptian or Nubian chieftain of Nubia, likely reigning concurrently with the end of the 11th and beginning of the 12th Dynasty during the early Middle Kingdom.

== Attestation ==
Segerseni is attested by one or two rock inscriptions discovered in Umbarakab (Khor-Dehmit) in Lower Nubia. Segerseni's throne name as given on the inscriptions remains in doubt as it was roughly carved and became badly weathered over time. It could be Menkhkare or Wadjkare. The former is now regarded as more probable. One of Segerseni's inscriptions possibly records a war in the unidentified region of Persenbet.

Segerseni is not attested on any of the Egyptian king lists.

== Biography ==
Even though Segerseni adopted the titles of an Egyptian pharaoh, there is no evidence of him outside of Nubia. He was thus most likely a pretender to the Egyptian or Nubian throne headquartered in Lower Nubia, during a politically troubled period: either at the beginning of the First Intermediate Period, during the Second Intermediate Period, or in the time span including the reign of Mentuhotep IV of the 11th Dynasty and the early reign of Amenemhat I of the 12th Dynasty. The latter possibility is seen as more probable by Egyptologists. In particular, these two rulers seem to have had problems in being universally recognized as legitimate pharaohs.

It is known that Amenemhat I dispatched Khnumhotep I, the faithful Great Chief of the Oryx nome (the 16th nome of Upper Egypt) at Elephantine to Nubia in order to wipe out the last resistance against him there, but it is not known with certainty who was the leader of this resistance. It remains conjectural to posit that it was Segerseni. Furthermore, two other rulers based in Nubia, Iyibkhentre and Qakare Ini are known, likely from the same time period. They were both likely pretenders to the Egyptian throne, and the relationships between them and Segerseni are unknown. If Segerseni was indeed Amenemhat I's foe, he could have been fighting on Mentuhotep IV's side or for his own Nubian realm. Indeed, Nubia had gained its independence during the First Intermediate Period, as indicated by the military campaigns of Mentuhotep II in the region, only 40 years prior to Segerseni's conjectured lifetime.
