= Teti, Son of Minhotep =

Egyptian official

Teti, Son of Minhotep, was an Egyptian official in Coptos during the reign of Pharaoh Nubkheperre Intef of the Seventeenth Dynasty of Egypt (reigned c. 1571 to mid-1560s BCE). His only clear attestation is in the Coptos Decree, which deprives him of his office and its stipend for some act of sacrilege. The exact nature of this crime is debated, largely due to the idiomatic or euphemistic language used in the text. Some have identified him as the same Teti who opposed Kamose several pharaohs later, which would indicate the pharaohs between Nubkheperre Intef and Kamose had very short reigns, but this identification remains problematic.

== Rank ==
Teti's position in Coptos has been identified variously as a haty-a or as merely a temple official. James Henry Breasted argued that the Coptos Decree must be read as ordering the demotion of a count and installing his replacement. Alternatively, Katja Goebs argues that Teti probably had never been the haty-a, since the titles the Coptos Decree stripped him of were purely temple offices.

== Crime ==
"The enemy was stolen by – cursed be his name – Teti, son of Minhotep" ... His name shall not be remembered in this temple, according as it is done toward one like him, who is hostile toward the enemies of his god.

— Coptos Decree

The common presumption has been that Teti committed some form of revolt. Harry Hall argued that a reference to "enemies" indicated that Teti had invited a Hyksos delegation into the temple. However, a study by Georges Posener has led to a reevaluation of this view. In his argument, Posener demonstrated that the Egyptian word for enemies, khefetiu, may be used as a euphemism to avoid writing about taboo subjects. Accordingly, when the text reads "the enemy was stolen," Posener believed it meant that the god, the temple idol, was stolen. On the basis of this use, scholars of the Hebrew Bible began to argue that a similar construction occurs in the Second Book of Samuel, explaining why the text reads "you have spurned the enemies of the Lord" where the offence is clearly against Yahweh.

While such a use may be established in later texts, Katja Goebs argued in a 2003 article that it is impossible for the crime of stealing the temple idol to be punished merely by stripping the offender of his titles. The typical punishment for such sacrilege was death by burning. Rather, Goebs argued that "enemy" also indicates a sacrifice, because in Egyptian ritual, the slaughtered animal symbolizes Set, the enemy of the Pharaonic god Horus, being slaughtered. Teti therefore would have stolen some of the herd for providing sacrificial animals, a crime more in keeping with what he received.

== Chronological synchronism ==
A rebel during the reign of Kamose, Teti son of Pepi, has been identified by Vandersleyen as the same person as Teti son of Minhotep, by arguing that Pepi is a diminutive of Minhotep. If these two persons were the same person, it would require that the reign of Nubkheperre Intef and Kamose could not be separated by too many years. However, Wolfgang Helck has argued that the frequency of these names is due instead to a large family in the area of Coptos with ties to the Sixth Dynasty of Egypt, since Teti and Pepy were names of important Sixth Dynasty pharaohs.
