= Qakare Ini =

Ancient Egyptian or Nubian ruler

- Kakare, Qaikare; In(tef), Ini(tef), Sa-Ra-Ini
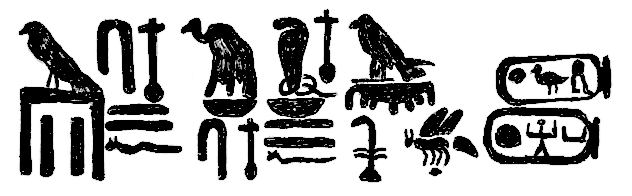
- Drawing of an inscription depicting Qakare's full titulary.

Pharaoh
- Reign: early 20th century BCE
Royal titulary
Horus name
Senefertawyef
S-nfr-t3wj.f
He who makes the Two Lands beautiful
G5	s nfr N19 f
Nebty name
Senefertawyef
S-nfr-t3wj.f
He who makes the Two Lands beautiful
G16	F35 N18 N18 I9
Golden Horus
Bik-nebu-nefer
Bjk-nbw-nfr
Beautiful golden falcon
G8	F35
Prenomen
Qakare
Q3j-k3-rˁ
Mighty is the Ka of Ra

M23 X1 L2 X1	N5 A28 D28 Z1
Nomen
Sa-Ra Ini
S3-rˁ Jni
The son of Ra, Ini

G39 N5	G38 N5 W25
- Dynasty: 11th–12th Dynasty

Qakare Ini (also Intef) was an ancient Egyptian or Nubian ruler who most likely reigned at the end of the 11th and beginning of the 12th Dynasty over Lower Nubia. Although he is the best attested Nubian ruler of this time period, nothing is known of his activities.

== Attestations ==
Qakare Ini is the best attested of a series of coeval Nubian rulers including Segerseni and Iyibkhentre. Indeed, his full pharaonic royal titulary is known thanks to 16 rock inscriptions found in Umbarakab, Mudenejar, Guthnis, Taifa, Abu Simbel and Toshka, all in Lower Nubia. In any case, these inscriptions record Qakare Ini's titulary, sometimes only a cartouche, and never give any more details. In the case of the inscription from Toshka, Qakare Ini's name is inscribed next to that of Iyibkhentre. However, the Egyptologist Darrell Baker proposed that this was due to the lack of space on the rock rather than pointing to a connection between the two rulers. Thus, the relationships between Qakare Ini and the other two Nubian rulers of the period, Segerseni and Iyibkhentre, remain unknown.

Qakare Ini is not attested on any Egyptian king list.

== Name ==
Qakare's personal name is Ini although in literature he is sometimes reported as Intef or Initef; curiously, the epithet son of Ra is placed inside the cartouche, thus rendering his name Sa-Ra-Ini.

== Datation ==
Qakare Ini could have been a pretender to the Egyptian throne headquartered in Lower Nubia, during the politically troubled period spanning the reign of Mentuhotep IV of the 11th Dynasty and the early reign of Amenemhat I of the 12th Dynasty. In fact, both those rulers seem to have had problems in being universally recognized as legitimate pharaohs. As Nubia had gained its independence from Egypt during the First Intermediate Period, it is possible that Qakare Ini was one of the last Nubian chieftains to resist the return of the Egyptians at the beginning of the 12th Dynasty.

Egyptologist Georges Posener hypothesized that Qakare Ini was a Theban son of Amenemhat I and was descended from the Mentuhotep dynasty through his mother, a secondary wife of Amenemhat. One of the aims of the plot that lead to the assassination of Amenemhat I would then have been to bring royal power and administration back to Thebes. Moreover, Lilian Postel pointed out that his first name – Intef – is borne by several rulers of the 11th Dynasty, and that his Horus Name – Sénéfertaouyèf – is very close to the Horus Name – Séankhtaouyèf – of Mentuhotep III, the last great representative of the 11th Dynasty.

Hungarian Egyptologist László Török suggested a much more recent dating for Qakare Ini (as well as for the other two related rulers mentioned above), some time after the reign of pharaoh Neferhotep I of the 13th Dynasty, that during the Second Intermediate Period, between 1730 and 1650 BCE. This is rejected by Darrell Baker and the Czech archeologist Zbyněk Žába who believe that Qakare Ini lived concurrently with the end of the 11th Dynasty in the late 20th century BCE.
