= Fossé, Ardennes =

Fossé
- Commune
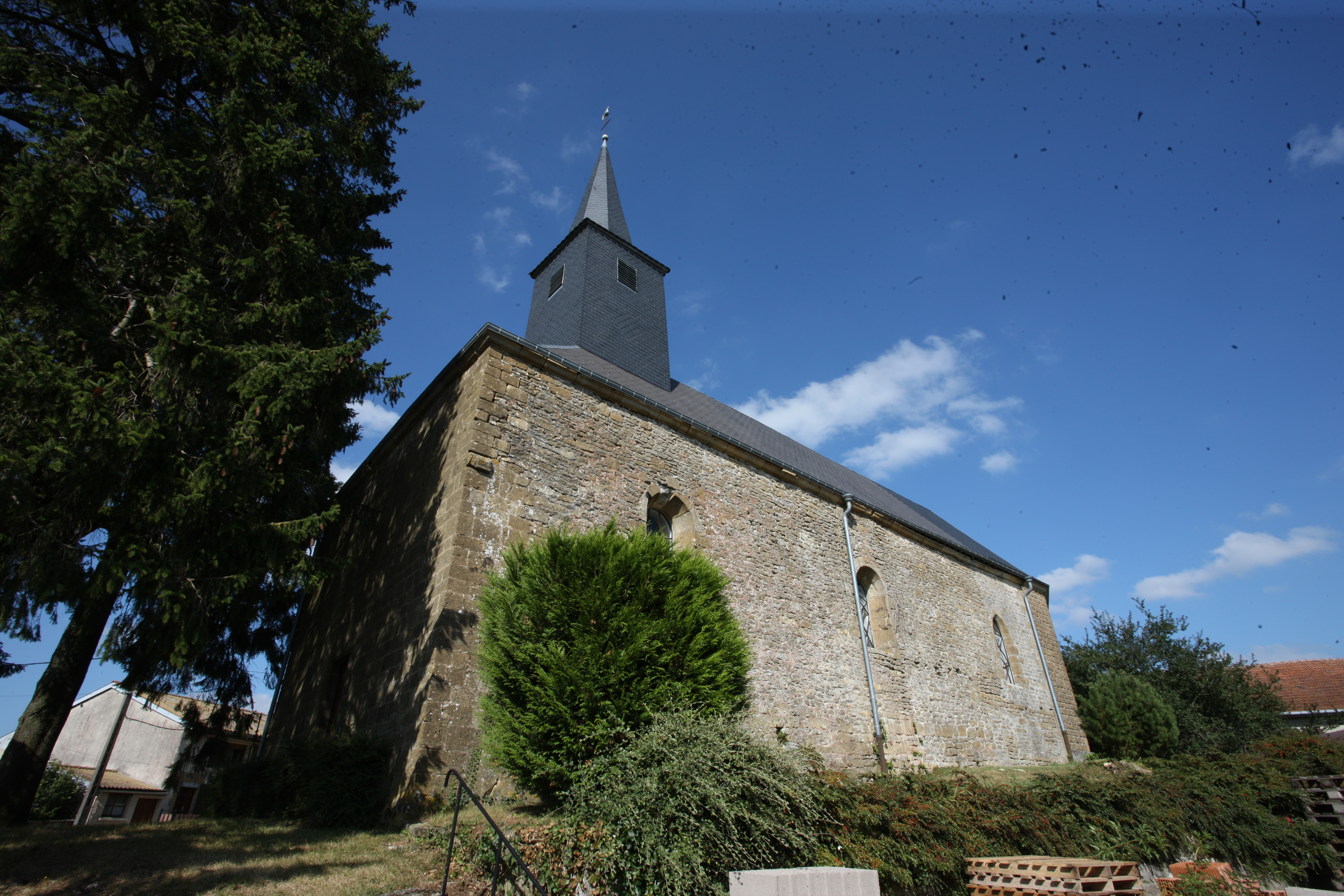
- The church in Fossé
- Location of Fossé
- Location within France Location within Grand Est
- Coordinates: 49°26′48″N 5°00′21″E
- Country: France
- Region: Grand Est
- Department: Ardennes
- Arrondissement: Vouziers
- Canton: Vouziers
- Intercommunality: Argonne Ardennaise

Government
  - Mayor (2020–2026): Christian Hulot
- Area^{1}: 8.94 km^{2} (3.45 sq mi)
- Elevation: 286 m (938 ft)
- Highest elevation: 329 m (1,079 ft)
- Lowest elevation: 206 m (676 ft)
- Population (2023): 63
  - Density: 7.0/km^{2} (18/sq mi)
- Time zone: UTC+01:00 (CET)
  - Summer (DST): UTC+02:00 (CEST)
- INSEE/Postal code: 08176 /08240
- ^{1} French Land Register data, which excludes lakes, ponds, glaciers > 1 km^{2} (0.386 sq mi or 247 acres) and river estuaries.

Fossé (French pronunciation: [fose]) is a commune in Ardennes, France. The French Egyptologist Adolphe Reinach was killed in Fossé in the first month of the First World War.

== Population ==
Historical population
Year	Pop.	±% p.a.
1968	109	—
1975	82	−3.98%
1982	86	+0.68%
1990	83	−0.44%
1999	76	−0.97%
2007	55	−3.96%
2012	53	−0.74%
2017	54	+0.37%
2023	63	+2.60%
Source: INSEE

== See also ==
- Communes of the Ardennes department
