= Hornakht (17th Dynasty) =

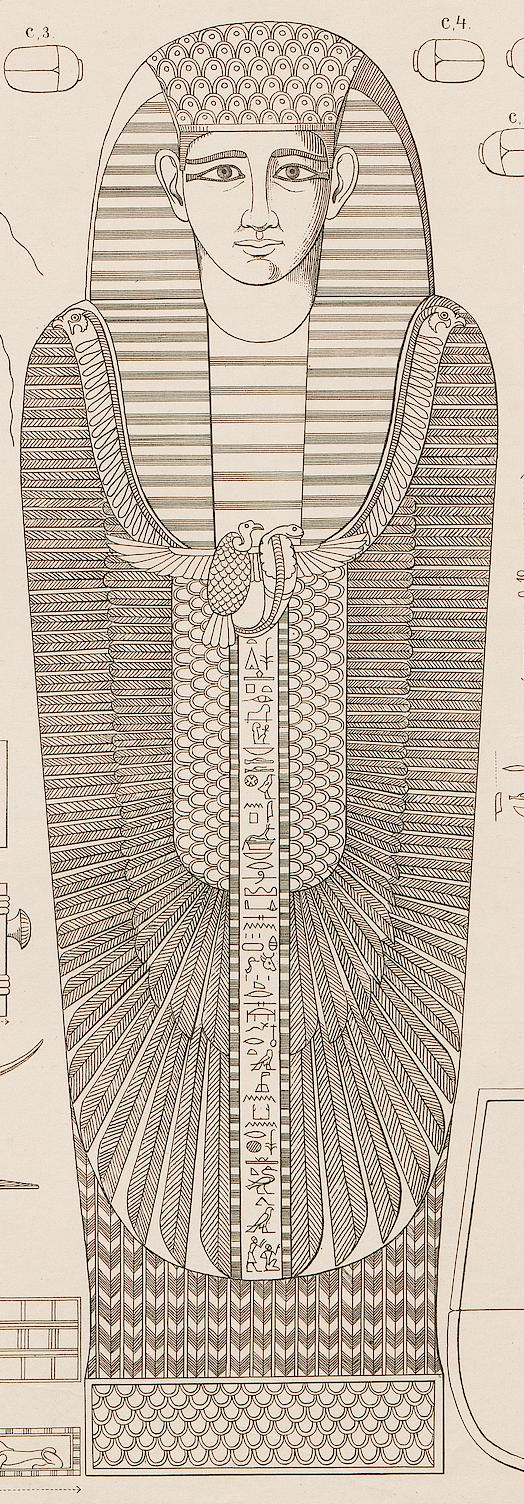
Drawing of Hornakht's rishi coffin

Hornakht was an ancient Egyptian official living at the end of the Second Intermediate Period. His title was royal acquaintance (with right of) access.

== Tomb ==
His burial was discovered undisturbed, on 21 December 1862 by Luigi Vassalli who worked for Auguste Mariette in Dra' Abu el-Naga' at Thebes. Gaston Maspero published the tomb group in 1892.

The burial contained the rishi coffin of Hornakht and a set of objects, some of them inscribed with the names of other officials some of these objects perhaps gifts to Hornakht. There was a throw stick with the name of king Seqenenre Djehuty-aa (Seqenenre Tao of the 17th Dynasty) also inscribed with the name of the king's son Tjuiu. The object provides an idea of Hornakht's dating. A box bears the name of the mayor Minemhat and there was a cosmetic spoon inscribed with the name and title of the mayor of Hierakonpolis Sobeknakht. These people are all most likely contemporary with Hornakht. A vase bears the name of an Idi and dates most likely to the Old Kingdom. Other objects found in the tomb are scarabs, stone vessels, a pair of sandals, a headrest and a gaming board.

- JE 21461 | At Dra Abu el-Naga, the Tomb of Hornakht, a throw-stick with the royal name of Seqenenre and King’s Son Tjuiu.

== Theories ==
Originally, Vassalli assigned the tomb to Tjuiu, but later called the tomb owner Aqhor, as he was reading the name on the coffin. However, most recent scholar read the name on the coffin as Hornakht. Aq is clearly a part of the title and translates as access, while the old reading of the name simply missed the name element nakht.
