= Intef =

W25 n&t&f
Intef
in hieroglyphs

Intef (also Antef, Inyotef and Anyotef) was a common ancient Egyptian name, normally transliterated as jnj-jt(=f) and translated: His father brought him.

== Pharaohs ==
=== 11th dynasty ===
- Intef the Elder, Theban Nomarch later considered the founding ancestor of the 11th Dynasty.
- Sehertawy Intef I, first ruler of the dynasty to claim an Horus name.
- Wahankh Intef II, 2112–2063 BC
- Nakhtnebtepnefer Intef III, a son of Intef II and father of Mentuhotep II

=== In Nubia ===
- Qakare Ini (Intef), possibly only in Nubia

=== 13th dynasty ===
- Ameny Antef Amenenhat, sometimes referred to as Intef IV, more generally as Amenemhat VI.
- Sehetepkare Intef, referred to as Intef IV or Intef V depending on the scholar

=== 17th dynasty ===
- Sekhemre-Wepmaat Intef, referred to as Intef V or Intef VI.
- Nubkheperre Intef, referred to as Intef VI or Intef VII.
- Sekhemre-Heruhirmaat Intef, referred to as Intef VII or Intef VIII.

== Court officials ==
- Intef (general) (11th dynasty)
