= Iyibkhentre =

Ancient Egyptian or Nubian ruler

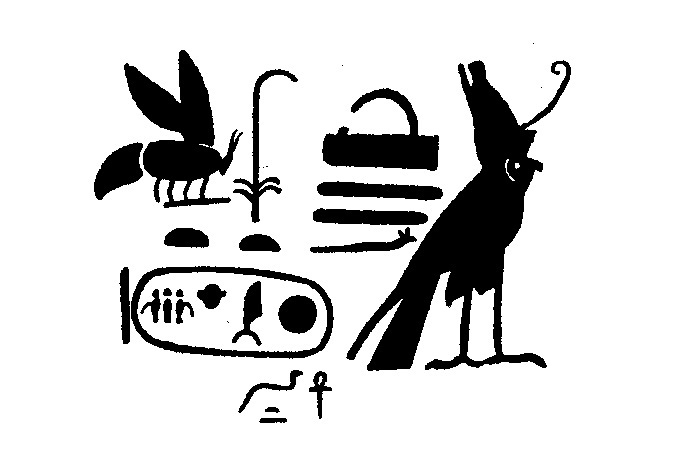
- Drawing of an inscription depicting Iyibkhentre's titulary.

Pharaoh
- Reign: early 20th century BCE
Royal titulary
Horus name
Geregtaw(y)ef
Grg-t3w(j)f
He who established its Two Lands
G5	U17 N19 f
Prenomen
Iyibkhentre
Jj jb ḫnt Rˁ
(Reading is uncertain)

M23 X1 L2 X1	N5 M18 W17 ib
- Dynasty: 11th–12th Dynasty

Iyibkhentre was an ancient Egyptian or Nubian ruler who most likely reigned at the end of the 11th and beginning of the 12th Dynasty.

== Biography ==
He could have been a pretender to the Egyptian throne headquartered in Lower Nubia, during the politically sensitive period within the reign of Mentuhotep IV of the 11th Dynasty and the early reign of Amenemhat I of the 12th Dynasty. In fact, both those rulers seem to have had problems in being universally recognized as legitimate pharaohs.

Hungarian Egyptologist László Török suggested a much more recent dating for Iyibkhentre (as well as for the other related rulers mentioned below), some time after the reign of pharaoh Neferhotep I of the 13th Dynasty (Second Intermediate Period).

Iyibkhentre adopted the pharaonic royal titulary, although only the Horus name and the Throne name are known from rock inscriptions at Abu Hor, Mediq and Toshka, all in Lower Nubia.

Like Iyibkhentre, two other rulers based in Nubia, Segerseni and Qakare Ini, likely were pretenders to the Egyptian throne, but the eventual relationships among the trio are unknown.
