= Coptos Decree =

The Coptos Decree of Nubkheperre Intef (reigned c. 1571-mid-1560s BC) is a legal ruling written in hieroglyphic on the wall of the Min-temple in Coptos.

== Content of the Decree ==
The Coptos Decree was issued by Nubkheperre Intef to the mayor of Koptos Minemhat concerning the removal of Teti, Son of Minhotep, from his position in the temple. According to the decree, Teti had committed some serious misconduct, which has been interpreted differently by different translators. Teti had either supported the kings' enemies, or had stolen an item from the temple of Min. The wording of the degree probably indicates the latter. The consequences of this crime were serious and far-reaching. The culprit not only lost his offices and emoluments, but he and his family members were excluded from his offices for the future.

== Historical significance ==
The Coptos Decree provides the highest documented regnal year for Nubkheperre Intef: his Year 3. It also establishes that Minemhat was the count or governor of Coptos in that year of Nubkheperre Intef's reign.

== Online link ==
- The Coptos decree of Nebkheperure-Intef
