= Adolphe Reinach =

French archaeologist and Egyptologist

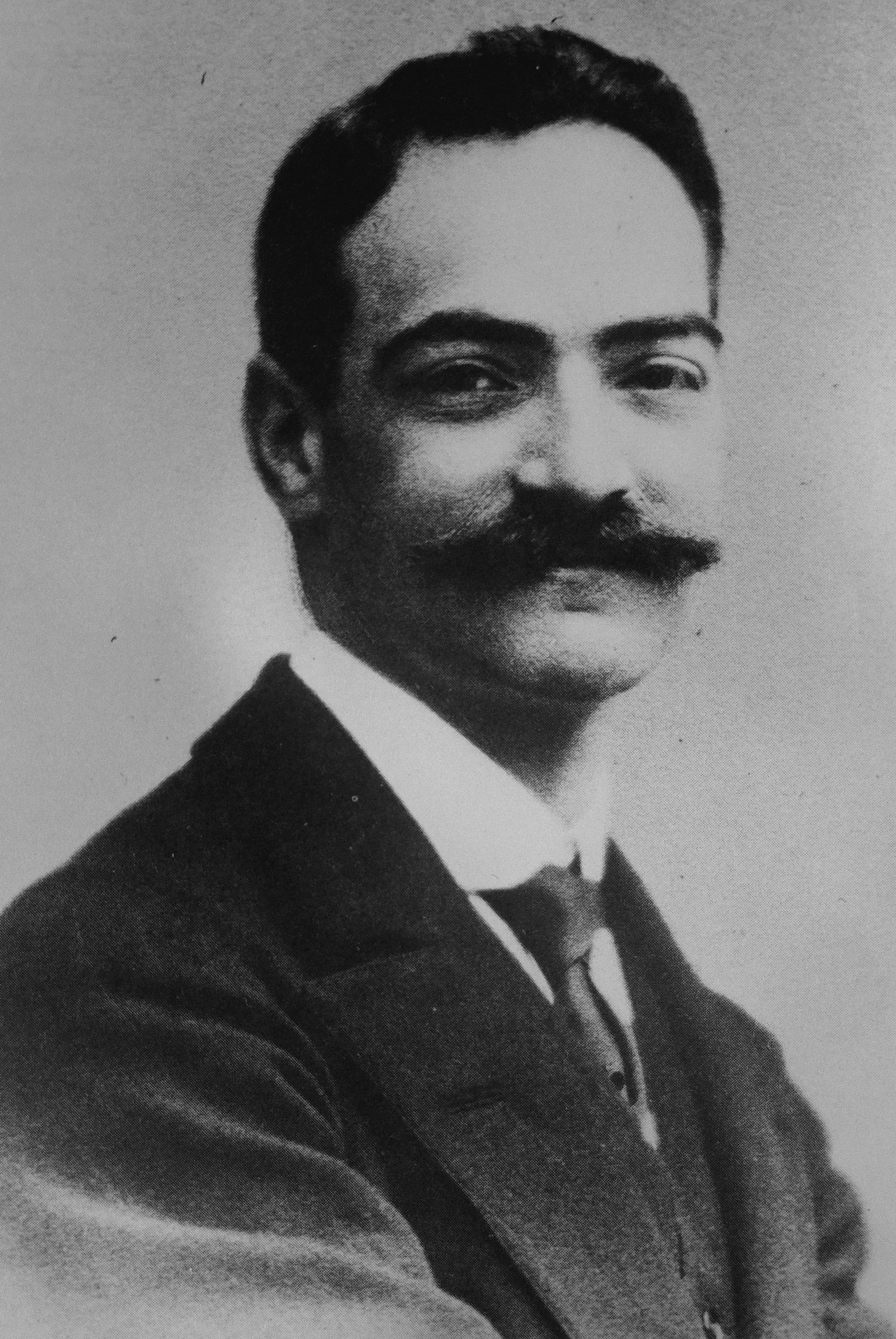
- Adolphe Reinach,1910
- Born: Adolphe Joseph Reinach; 12 January 1887; Paris, France
- Died: 30 August 1914 (aged 27); Fossé, Ardennes, France
- Occupations: Archaeologist and Egyptologist
- Known for: Participated in excavations in Greece and Egypt and published works on the Gauls
- Notable work: L'Égypte préhistorique

Adolphe Joseph Reinach (12 January 1887 – 30 August 1914) was a French archaeologist and Egyptologist who participated in excavations in Greece and Egypt and published works on the Gauls.

Working in Egypt for the Société française des fouilles archéologiques with Raymond Weill in 1910–1911, he discovered the Coptos Decrees in the temple of Min at Coptos.

== Biography ==
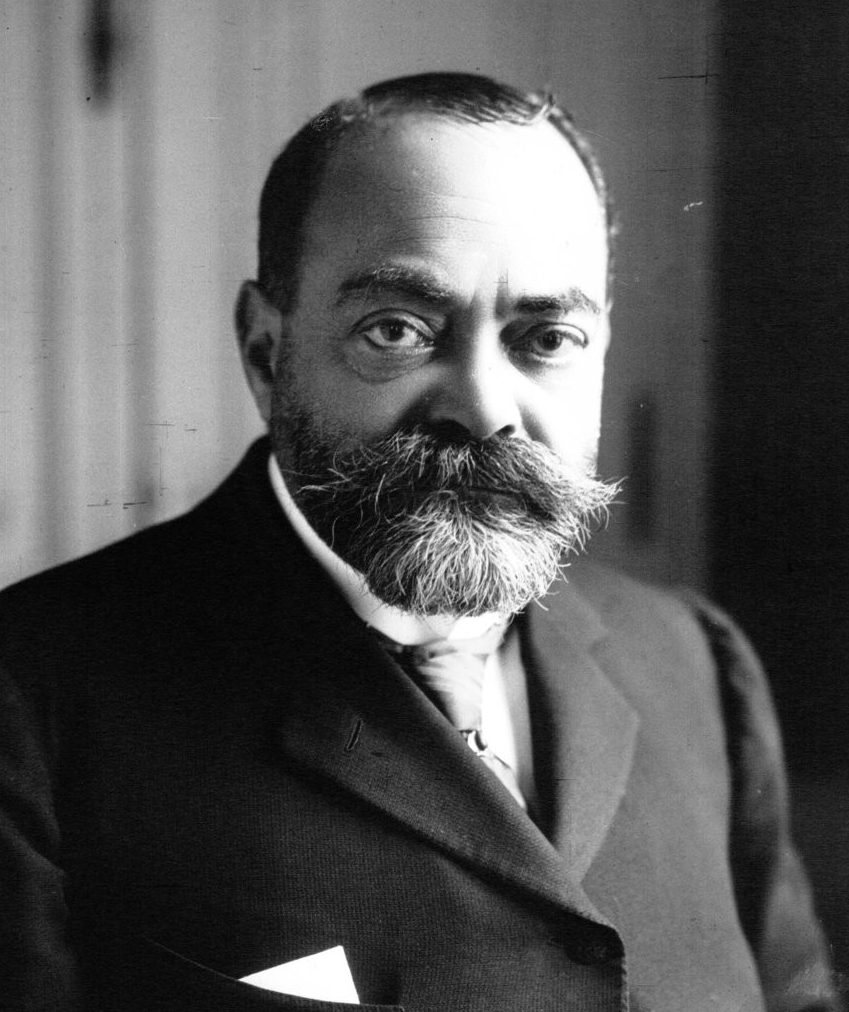
Joseph Reinach, Adolphe's father, here in 1912.

Adolphe Reinach was born on 12 January 1887 in Paris, the son of the archaeologist Joseph Reinach (1856-1921) and his wife Henriette-Clémentine Reinach (1866-1918).

Adolphe did numerous travels around the Mediterranean and consequently studied at the French School at Athens from 1909 until 1911. He participated in excavations in Thasos and then proposed to excavate the site of Qift in Egypt for the Société française d'archéologie. After securing the necessary funds in 1910, he directed the works in Qift with Raymond Weill and André Martinaud, who documented the excavations with numerous photographs. It is during this time that Adolphe Reinach uncovered the Coptos Decrees dating back to the end of the Old Kingdom and First Intermediate Period. A number of the artefacts unearthed by Reinach are now housed in the Musée Guimet and Museum of Fine Arts of Lyon, both in Lyon.

With the onset of the First World War, Adolphe Reinach was mobilised. A lieutenant of Cuirassiers in the 46e régiment d'infanterie in the French Army, he was killed in Fossé in the Ardennes soon after the beginning of the war, at the end of August 1914. Reinach had married Marguerite Dreyfus, daughter of Mathieu Dreyfus and niece of Alfred Dreyfus, and had a son, Jean-Pierre Reinach (1915–1942), born after his father's death. Jean-Pierre was killed during the Second World War, at the same age as his father was during the First.

== Works ==
- Adolphe Reinach: L'Égypte préhistorique, 1908, Kessinger Publishing, new edition 2010, ISBN 978-1166694579, available online.
- Adolphe Reinach: Voyageurs et pèlerins dans l'Égypte gréco-romaine, Bulletin de la Société archéologique d'Alexandrie, Société de publications égyptiennes, 1910.
- Adolphe Reinach: Égyptologie et histoire des religions, Imprimerie F. Paillart, 1913.
- Salomon Reinach, Paul Milliet, Adolphe Reinach: Recueil Milliet; textes grecs et latins relatifs à l'histoire de la peinture ancienne publiés, traduits et commentés, sous le patronage de l'Association des études grecques, Vol 1., 1921, new edition 2013, HardPress Publishing, ISBN 978-1314398045. See also
- Victor Chapot, Adolphe Reinach, Gaston Colin: L'Hellénisation du monde antique: leçons faites à l'École des Hautes Études Sociales, (1914), Kessinger Publishing, new edition 2010, ISBN 978-1168124715.
- Adolphe Reinach: La Question crétoise : vue de Crète, Paris : Geuthner; 1st Edition (1910).
- Adolphe Reinach: Les têtes coupées et les trophées en Gaule, E. Champion, Paris 1913.
- Adolphe Reinach: Divinités gauloises au serpent, E. Leroux, 1911.
