= Harawî =

Region of Upper Egypt

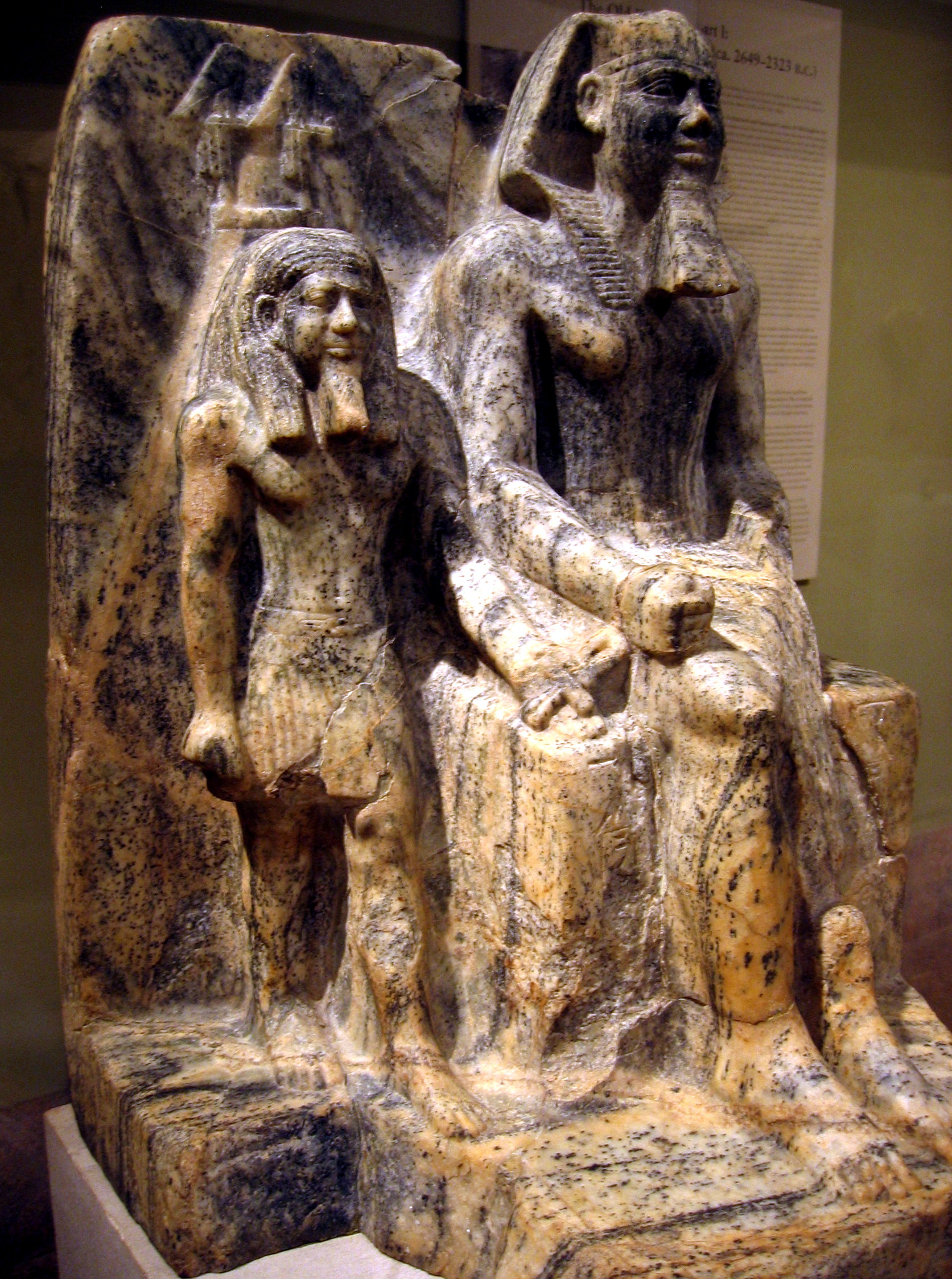
King Sahure (right) with the deified nome of Harawî (left)

Harawî (also Herui) was a designated nome in the area around Coptos in Upper Egypt. Harawî was the 5th Nome of Upper Egypt and once politically important, but during the 11th Dynasty, it was overshadowed by Thebes in the nome of Waset. Another important town in the nome was Ombos, the main cult place of the deity Seth. A third important place was Iushenshen, which became capital of the nome at the very end of the Old Kingdom, at least for a certain period.

The Harawî nome was at the starting point of the two great routes leading to the coast of the Red Sea: one towards the port Tââou (Myos Hormos), the other more southerly, towards the port of Shashirît (Berenice Troglodytica).

The nome is first mentioned in the tomb of the king's son Netjeraperef at Dahshur, who dates under Snofru.

The reading of the nome's name is disputed in Egyptology and is written with two falcons. The hieroglyph of a falcon can be read in different ways, either as Her, or Horus. In this case, Herui means the two Horuses. Other readings for a falcon are netjer (god): netjerui (the two gods) or bik (falcon): bikui (the two falcons).
