= William C. Hayes =

American egyptologist

William Christopher Hayes
- Born: March 21, 1903; Hempstead village, New York
- Died: July 10, 1963 (aged 60); New York City
- Occupation: Egyptology
- Known for: The Scepter of Egypt

William Christopher Hayes (March 21, 1903 – July 10, 1963) was an American Egyptologist. His main fields of study were history of Egyptian art and translation/interpretation of texts.

== Biography ==
His father William C. Hayes Sr. was a British national and his mother Helen Hawthorne Maule was from Philadelphia and both parents were passionate about horses. Bill initially went to William Penn Charter School (then known as Penn Charter) and then went to the prep school St George's for 4 years, where he won the "George Gordon King medal" in advanced greek. A pupil of Sir Alan Gardiner, Hayes attended the Princeton University(in 1920) where he graduated in 1935 with a dissertation on the royal sarcophagi of the 18th Dynasty. For most of his life he was involved with the Metropolitan Museum of Art: first as a member of the museum's Egyptian Expedition (since 1926), then as an assistant curator (1936) and later as curator of the museum's Egyptian Department, from 1952 until his death occurred on July 10, 1963.
In 1956, he was involved as a consultant in the production of the film The Ten Commandments. His best-known work, The Scepter of Egypt, is still considered by many Egyptologists as one of the standard works in their field.

== Significant works ==
- 1961–1962. Chronology: Egypt – To End Of The Twentieth Dynasty. In The Cambridge Ancient History
- 1956. Most ancient Egypt. University of Chicago Press (as editor)
- 1953–1959. The Scepter of Egypt, a Background for the Study of the Egyptian Antiquities in the Metropolitan Museum of Art. part I, New York 1953; part II, New York 1959
- 1942. Daily life in Ancient Egypt. National Geographic Society
- 1935. Royal Sarcophagi of the XVIII Dynasty (dissertation)
