= Qift =

Town in Egypt

Qift قفط
- City
- Green area in city of Qift

- Location in Egypt
- Coordinates: 25°59′44″N 32°48′57″E
- Country: Egypt
- Governorate: Qena Governorate

Area
  - Total: 43.5 sq mi (112.6 km^{2})

Population (2021)
  - Total: 157,383
  - Density: 3,620/sq mi (1,398/km^{2})
- Time zone: UTC+2 (EET)
  - Summer (DST): UTC+3 (EEST)

Qift (Egyptian Arabic: قفط [ʔeftˤ]; Coptic: Ⲕⲉϥⲧ Keft or Kebto; Egyptian Gebtu; Ancient Greek: Κόπτος Coptos / Koptos; Roman Justinianopolis) is a city in the Qena Governorate of Egypt about 43 km (27 mi) north of Luxor, situated a little south of latitude 26° north, on the east bank of the Nile. In ancient times its proximity to the Red Sea made it an important trading emporium between India, Punt, Arabia Felix and the North. It was important for nearby gold and quartzite mines in the Eastern Desert, and as a starting point for expeditions to Punt (in modern Somalia) by way of the path through the Wadi Hammamat to the Red Sea port at Tjau (modern El Qoseir).

== History ==
=== Pre-dynastic and Pharaonic Period ===
V33 D58 X1 Z4 G4 X1 O49 or V33 D58 X1 O49
gbtjw
in hieroglyphs

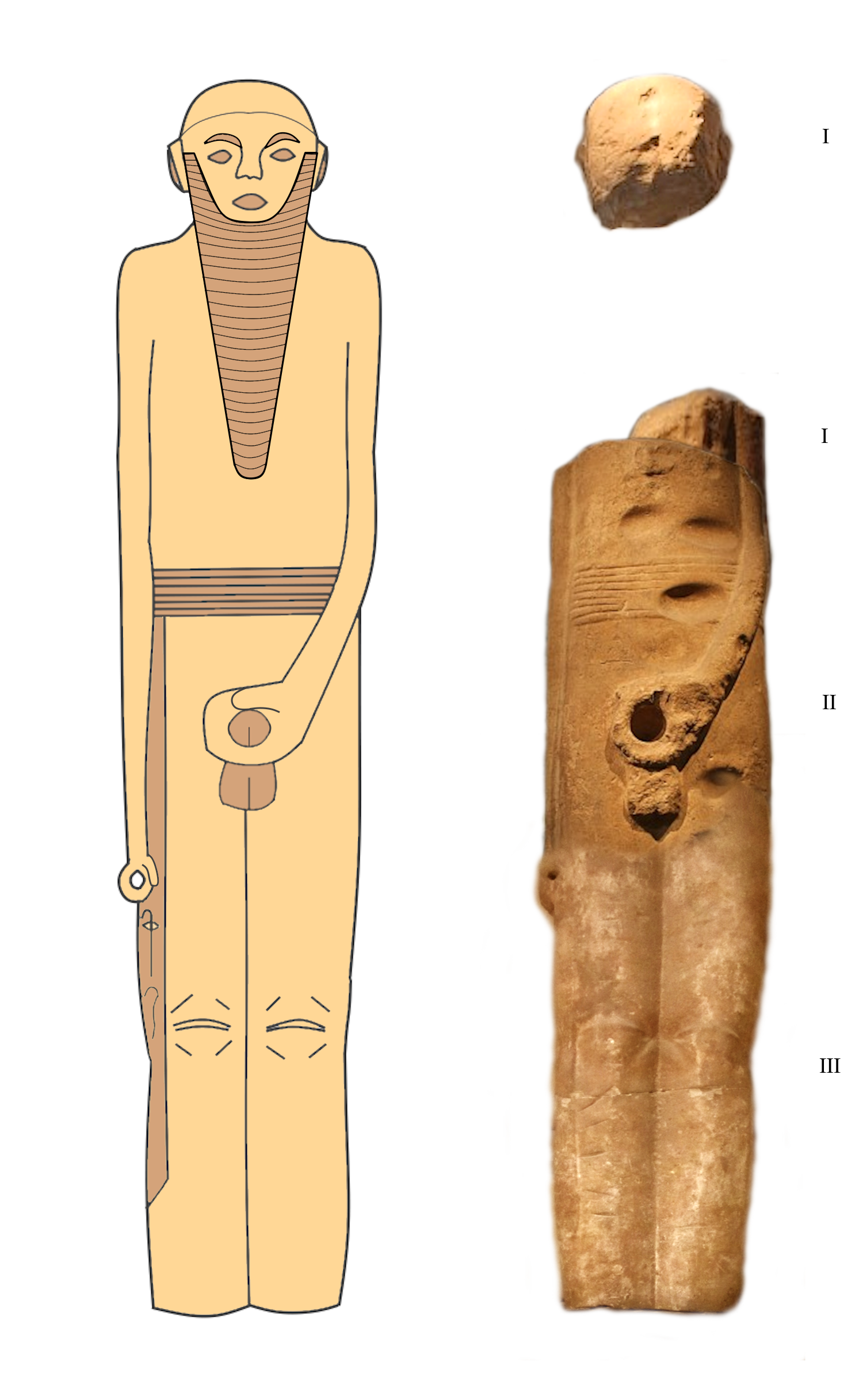
Reconstruction of the Koptos colossi, pre-dynastic colossal statues of the God Min, Temple of Koptos, Naqada III, about 3300 BCE.

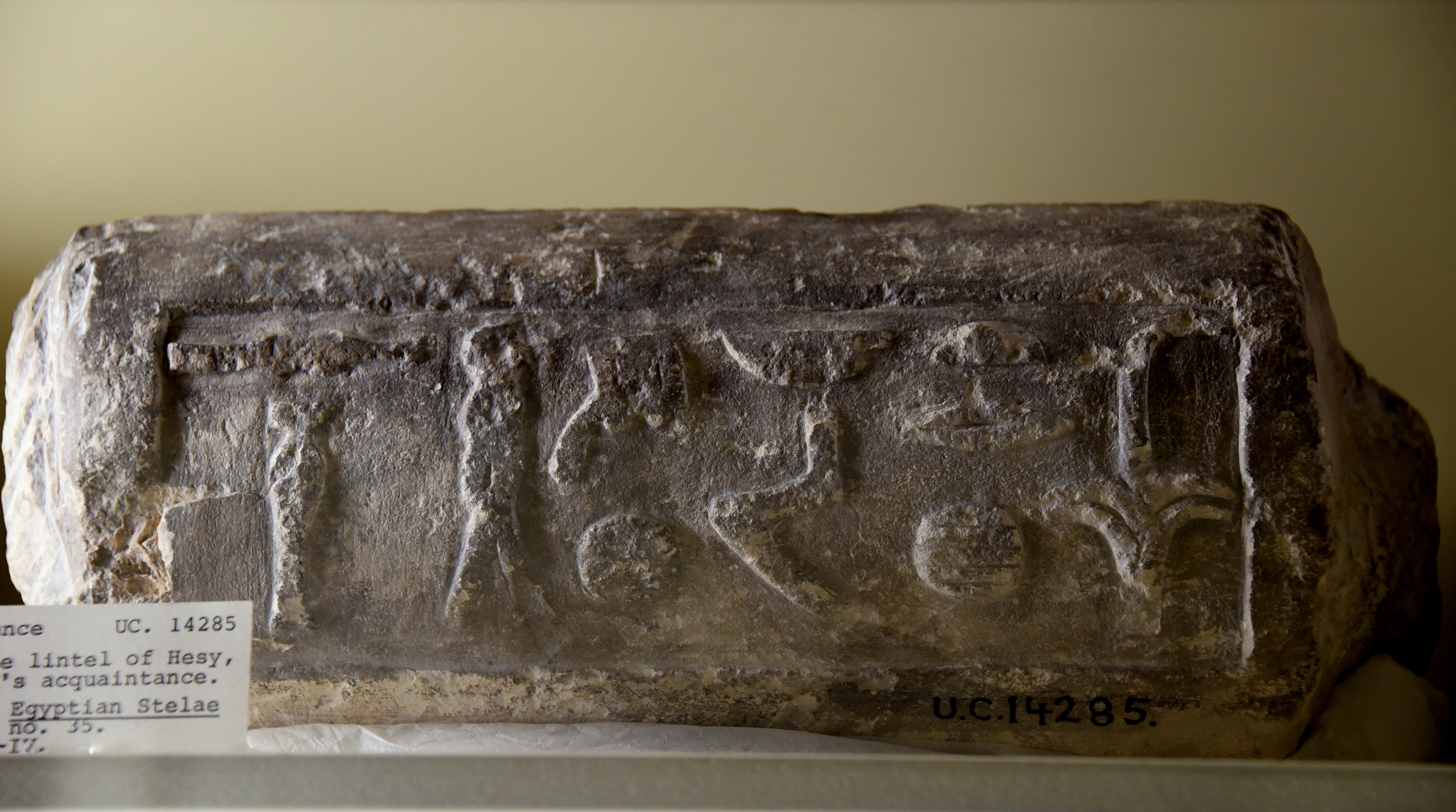
Limestone lintel of Hesy (Hesi), the King's acquaintance. Old Kingdom, 3rd to 4th Dynasties. From Koptos, Egypt. Petrie Museum, London

In ancient Egypt, Qift, known then as Gebtu, was an important center for administration, religion, and commerce, being the chief city of the fifth Upper Egyptian nome of Harawî (Two Hawks). From Qift and Qus, trading expeditions heading for the Red Sea and many mining expeditions into the Eastern Desert left the Nile Valley. Gebtu was at the starting-point of the two great caravan routes leading to the coast of the Red Sea, the one toward the port Tââou (Myoshormos or Myos Hormos), the other more southerly, toward the port of Shashirît (Berenice). Under the native pharaohs, the whole trade of southern Egypt with the Red Sea passed over these two roads; under the Ptolemies as well as in Roman and Byzantine times, merchants followed the same roads for purposes of barter at the coasts of Zanzibar and in Southern Arabia, India, and the Far East.

Gebtu was the most important religious center in the area. Its principal male deity was Min, a sky-god whose symbol was a thunderbolt. He became a male fertility deity, and also was regarded as the male deity of the desert region to the east.

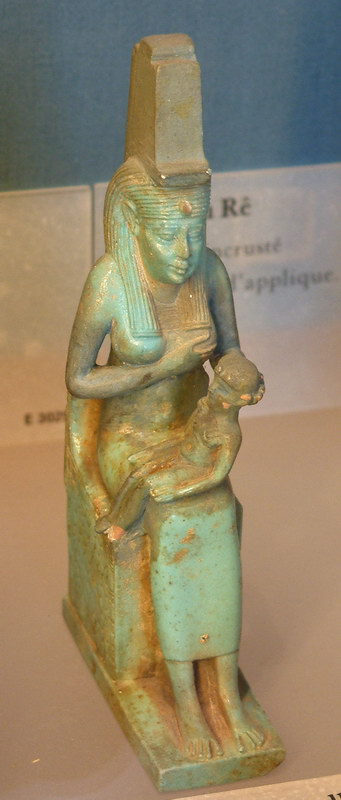
Isis nursing her infant son – Louvre

His cult rose to prominence in the Middle Kingdom. At that time, he became associated with Horus as the deity, Min-Horus. Later, he was fused with Amen in the deity Min-Amen-ka-Mut-ef, as "Min-Amen-bull of his mother" (Hathor-Isis). Isis (Hathor-Isis) and her infant, Horus, were the deities connected with Gebtu, named Coptos during the Greco-Roman period, probably from the reinterpretation of the Two Hawks of the Nome, Harawî, standard as Min and Horus. Gebtu, once politically important, especially under the Eleventh Dynasty, was overshadowed by Thebes.

=== Greco-Roman and Byzantine Periods ===
The town was of importance in Hellenistic times, when it was the terminus of a caravan route to Berenice on the Red Sea. It was built up by Augustus, fell to the Blemmyes in the 3rd cent. AD, and was almost destroyed by Diocletian in AD 292.

It recuperated its prominence under the Antonines; it was the base camp of Legio III Cyrenaica, or at least one of its subunits. It rebelled, but soon was captured in 292 by Diocletian after a long siege and the original city got heavily damaged. It was then reconstructed as a Roman City with many fortifications and Roman camps. In the 6th century, Qift was renamed Justinianopolis, like several other cities, after the Byzantine emperor Justinian I. The present-day village of Qift is on the site.

The epic poet Christodorus was from the city.

=== Muslim Period ===
Under the caliphs and the sultans in the Islamic era Qift was a chief city of Upper Egypt and a Shi'ite waqf of the Ashraf Alids. In the 12th/13th century the geographer Yaqut al-Hamawi wrote of Qift's commerce with India and its surrounding orchards. Several generations of qadi high-officials of the Ayubids derived their family nisba (surname), 'Al-Qifti', from the territory. The celebrated biographer al-Qifti, was born here in 1172, where he received an early education. In 1176, the Copts revolted against the rule of Al-Adil I, the brother of Saladin. He forcefully put down the revolt by crucifying 3,000 Copts around the city. In the 13th century, numerous monasteries continued in operation around the city. However, when the Ottomans who ruled over Egypt leveled much of the medieval town in the 16th century, its former significance was never regained, and, by the early 20th century, its population stood at just 8934.

== Archaeology ==
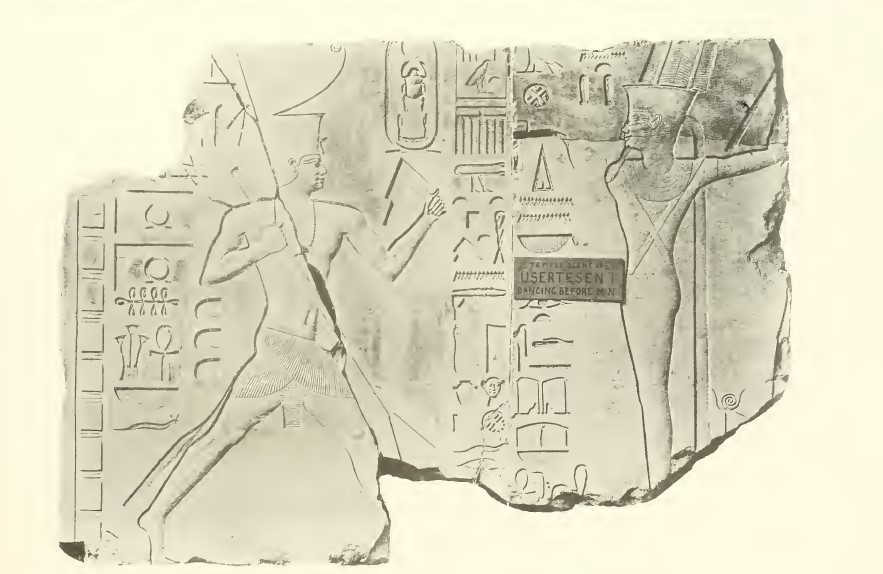
"One of the finest" reliefs Petrie found in Koptos was this ithyphallic representation of Min before Senureset I. Prudery toward erect representations got in the way of photography and exhibition of the city's artifacts in Victorian times and the late 20th century. Here, then-assistant Margaret Murray covered the member for Petrie's photograph. Some items were totally omitted from the initial record to protect sensibilities, which can lead to problems of provenance for archaeological phalloi.

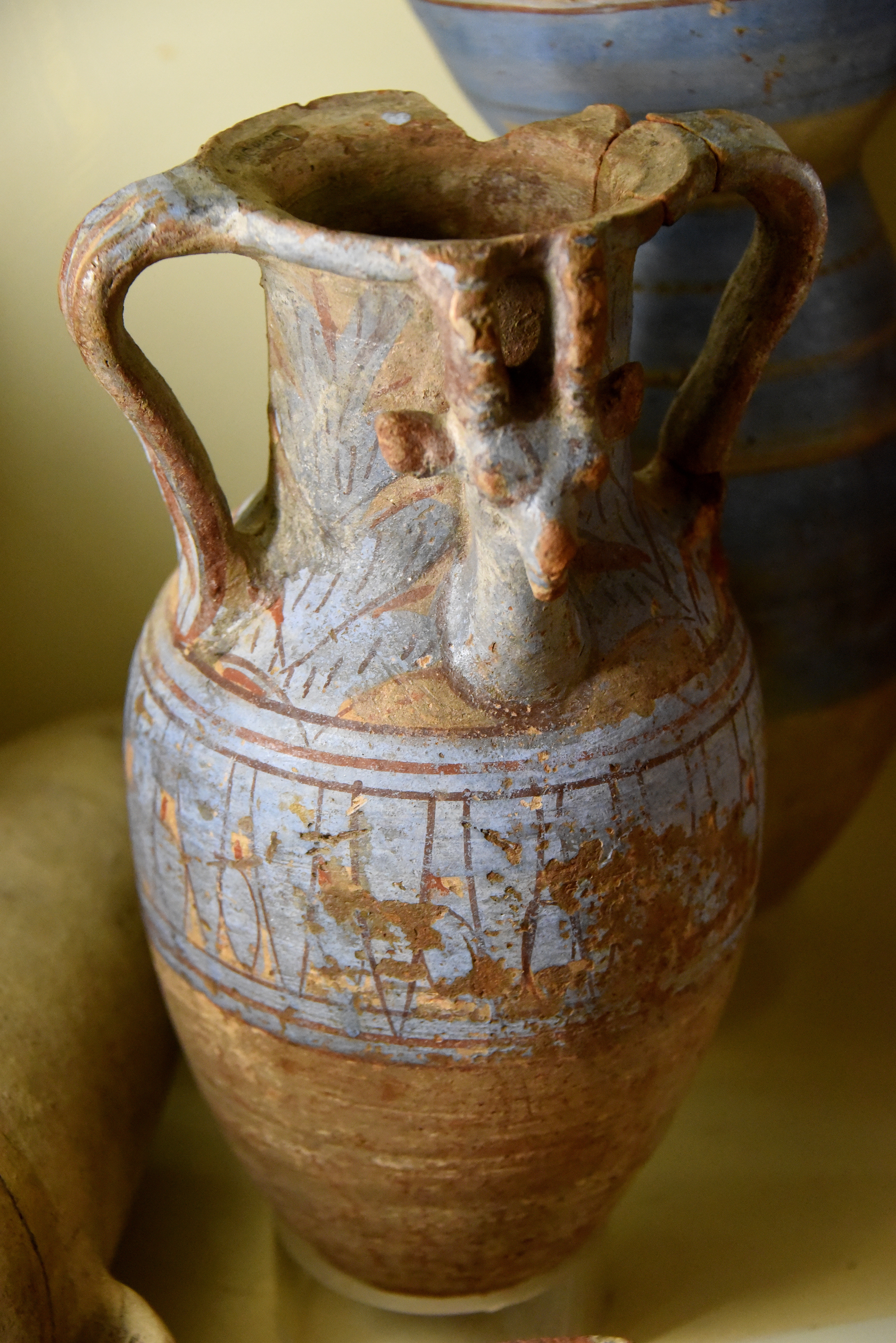
Storage jar with blue lotus flower decorations. Ibex or gazelle's head peeking out from vegetation. 18th Dynasty. From Koptos (Qift), Egypt. The Petrie Museum of Egyptian Archaeology, London

Remains of three temple groups surrounded by an enclosure wall were located during the excavations of W. M. Flinders Petrie in 1893–1894, and later, by Raymond Weill and Adolphe Joseph Reinach in 1910–1911. Qift was the focus of an American archaeological project from 1987 to 1992 and an Australian one between 2000 and 2003.

=== Northern temple ===
The undecorated northern temple of Min and Isis dates to the Ptolemaic period. Earlier structures on the site date back to the Middle Kingdom, with significant work during the New Kingdom reign of Tuthmosis III. The temple was rebuilt during the Ptolemaic Period. The later work has been attributed to an official named Sennuu-shepsi on behalf of Ptolemy II Philadelphus (ruling from 281 BC to 246 BC). This northern temple has some later additions by Ptolemy IV Philopator ruling from 221–205 BC. He was the son of Ptolemy III and Berenice II of Egypt and was the fourth pharaoh of the Ptolemaic Egypt, when the decline of the Ptolemaic kingdom began. More additions were added by Julio-Claudian emperors of Rome, Caligula, and Nero. The second pylon still carries the dedication text of Nero, and the cartouche of Caligula appears on the north end of this structure. In the court of the temple a headdress of a statue of Arsinoe II, the wife of Ptolemy II Philadelphus, was found. A chapel from the Saite period stands in the court. The remains of this chapel of Osiris, erected by Amasis II of the 26th Dynasty, also were found near the northern temple. It was built by Ahmose-si-Neith. Scenes on the facade of the temple show the deified king Ptolemy I Soter leaving a palace, while other items such as a triad and a stela date to the time of Ramesses II.

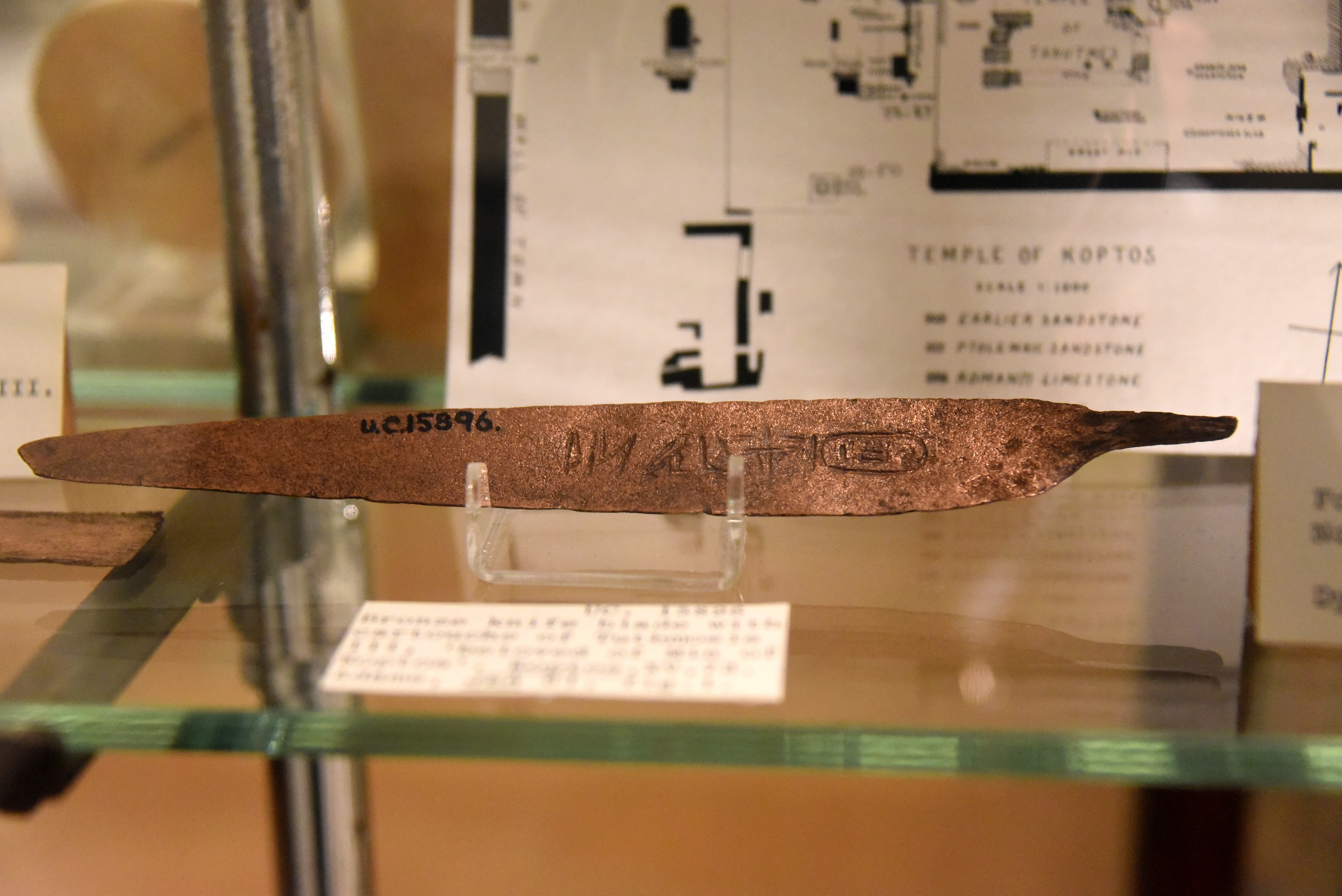
Bronze knife blade inscribed with cartouche of Thutmose III, "Beloved of Min of Koptos". 18th Dynasty. Probably foundation deposit no.1, Temple of Min, Koptos, Egypt. Petrie Museum

This temple stands on the site of earlier Ancient Egyptian temple structures. Foundation deposits point to a temple of Thutmose III of the 18th Dynasty. Another temple belonged to Amenemhat I and his son, Senusret I, both of the 12th Dynasty. Senusret I is shown receiving life from Bubastis and Nekhbet. Within this temple a decree from the 17th Dynasty ruler Nubkheperre Intef was found by the East doorway. The decree describes how Nubkheperre Intef deposed a man named Teti.

=== Middle temple ===
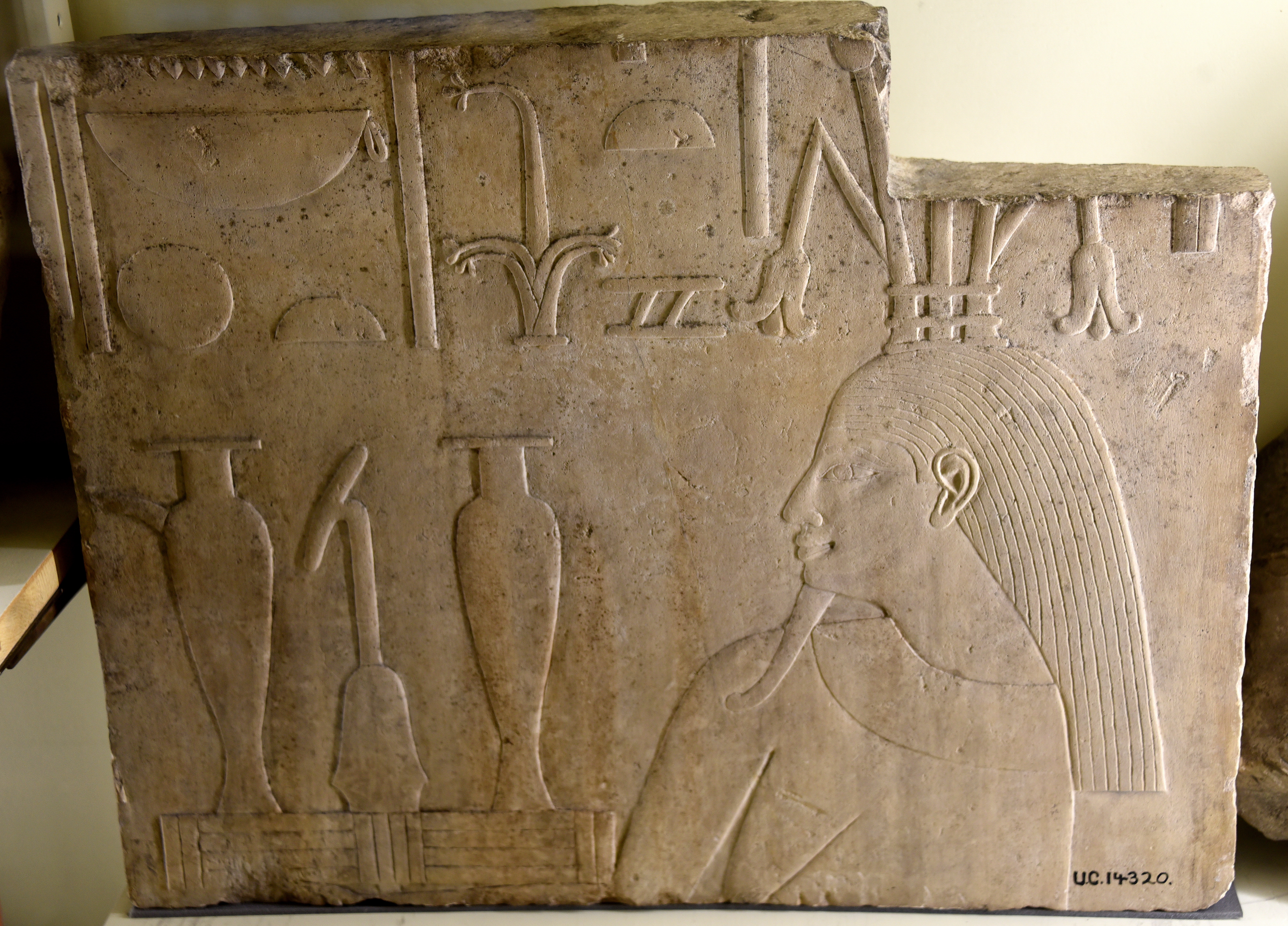
Limestone slab showing the Nile flood god Hapy. 12th Dynasty. From the foundations of the temple of Thutmose III, Koptos, Egypt. The Petrie Museum of Egyptian Archaeology, London

The middle temple dates back to the time of Thutmose III of the 18th Dynasty. The temple was later rebuilt by Ptolemy II Philadelphus and restored by the Roman emperor Claudius. At the site of the later middle temple built during the Ptolemaic kingdom, blocks of an earlier structure by Senusret I and a gate of Thutmose III, with additions probably made by Osorkon II of the 22nd Dynasty, were found. This later middle temple was built during the Ptolemaic kingdom by Ptolemy II Philadelphus, with minor additions by members of the Julio-Claudian Dynasty of Rome, Caligula, Claudius, and Trajan. The foundations contained objects from the Old Kingdom and the First Intermediate Period. Stelae were found depicting Pepi I and his mother Queen Iput before the god Min, two decrees and fragments of others by Pepi II. A First Intermediate Period decree regarding offerings to a statue of Pepi II was found. The stele mentions the overseer of the prophets named Idi. Three decrees of Neferkauhor, two of which were addressed to a Vizier and are now in the Cairo Museum.

=== Southern temple ===
The southern temple was likely dedicated to Geb At the site of the southern temple, are the gates of Nectanebo II of the 30th Dynasty, who was the last native king of Egypt. He was placed on the throne by a Spartan king and lost a conflict with the Persians, who then overtook Egypt. Other structures found at the site include a set of stelae, now known as the Coptos Decrees. These stelae date to the Sixth and Seventh dynasties, with copies of royal decrees from the pharaohs concerning the temple and its personnel. The name by which the stelae are known reflects the much later Greek name for the city, Coptos or Koptos however. A chapel of Ptolemaic dynasty pharaoh Cleopatra VII and her son, Ptolemy XV Caesarion, has been found at the site as well. These rulers of Ancient Egypt for six hundred years were not native, but of Macedonian Greek origin (the Macedonians had begun the merging of Greek and Near Eastern culture known as the Hellenistic Culture under Alexander the Great). Without many changes, however, they adopted the culture and religious practices of the country they occupied. Cleopatra even learned the ancient Egyptian language, which never had been used by these rulers. The Greeks sought to find parallels to their own religious beliefs and would describe the Egyptian deities as related to their own. Built even later, after the conquest by the Romans in 30 AD, gates associated with the Roman emperors Caligula and Claudius are documented at the site. The Romans also continued the religious traditions of Ancient Egypt, adopting some completely, and drawing parallels (similar to the Greek rulers) for others.

=== Temple of Claudius at El-Qala ===
Northeast of Qift, at the modern village of El-Qala, the Roman emperor Claudius also built a small temple and dedicated it to Min, Isis, and Horus. The Horus name of the Roman emperor Tiberius (emperor 14–37 A.D.) is shown on two columns in the sanctuary. In the same sanctuary Claudius is shown before Isis. In the south chapel the emperor offers to Hathor, while on the exterior he is shown offering to the united emblems of Upper and Lower Egypt.

== Ecclesiastical history ==
The Christian city was still important enough to become a bishopric, suffragan of Ptolemais in the Late Roman province Thebais Secunda. Five bishops are known (Le Quien, II, 607): Theodorus, a partisan of Meletius; Phoebammon in 431; Sabinus in 451; Vincent, author of the "Canonical Solutions", preserved in an Arabic translation and highly esteemed by the Copts; Moyses, who wrote the panegyric of Vincent.

It faded under Islamic rule, no later than the Ottoman ruin of the city.

=== Titular see ===
The diocese was nominally restored as a Latin Catholic titular bishopric, initially under the name Coptos, which was changed in 1925 to Coptus. It is vacant since decades, having had the following incumbents, both of the lowest (episcopal) rank:

- Francis Hennemann, Pallottines (S.A.C.) (1913.07.16 – 1951.01.17)
- Luis Alfredo Carvajal Rosales (1955.07.28 – 1967.02.17).

== See also ==
- List of cities and towns in Egypt
- Wadi Hammamat

== Bibliography ==
- Breasted, James Henry, "General Index (geographical) under Coptos", Egypt
- Kiepert, Heinrich (1878), Lehrbuch der alten Geographie, Berlin: Columbia University Press, p. 202
- Abū Ṣāliḥ the Armenian (1895), Evetts, B. T. A. (ed.), "Churches & Monasteries of Egypt", Anecdota Oxoniensia, Semitic Series (7), translated by Evetts, Basil Thomas Alfred, Oxford: Clarendon Press
- Ya'qūbī, B.G.A., vol. vii, p. 333
- Ibn al-Faqīh, B.G.A., vol. 73
- Mehren (1874), Manuel de la cosmographie de Moyen-āge, Copenhague, pp. 325, 328
- al-Maqrīzī, Wiet (ed.), "Mawā'iẓ", M. I. F. A. O., xxx
- ibid., vol. xxxiii
- ibid., vol. xlvi
- Ibn Duqmāq (1893), Vollers (ed.), K. al-Intiṣār, vol. ii, Cairo, p. 32
- ibid., p. 33
- Idrīsī, Muhammad (1836), Géographie d'Édrisi, vol. i, translated by Jaubert, Pierre Amédée, Paris, Impr. royale
- Abū ‘l-Fidā’, Reinaud; de Slane (eds.), Kitāb Takwīm al-Buldān, p. 210
- Yāqūt, Wüstenfeld (ed.), Mu'jam al-Buldan, vol. iv, p. 152
- Ali Basha Mubārak (1889), al-Khitat al-Tawfiqiyya al-Jadida, vol. xiv, Būlāk, p. 104
- ibid., p. 105

== Sources and external links ==
- Home Page, The Qift Regional Expedition, 31 July 2003, archived from the original on 9 April 2005
- GigaCatholic, with titular incumbent biography links
