= Sememiah =

High official in ancient Egypt

Sememiah was a high ancient Egyptian official of the 18th Dynasty in office under the ruling queen Hatshepsut (about 1507–1458 BC). His main title was that of an Overseer of the treasuries.

Sememiah is mainly known from his Theban tomb chapel (TT127) where there are remains of a longer biographical inscription. However, the inscription is not well preserved. Therefore it is problematic to reconstruct his career. Sememiah seems to have started in the temple of Amun and was scribe of the offering table and guardian of the offerings of Amun, as well as scribe of the counter of the cattle of Amun. It is unclear when he was appointed to an Overseer of the treasuries, but this was for sure under Hatshepsut who was once several times mentioned in the biography although here name was always erased. An important part of his career was certainly the expedition to Punt mentioned in the text, although it is not possible to gain any firm information from the destroyed text. It seems most likely that Sememiah died under Hatshepsut. There is no evidence that he was still in office under Thutmose III, the queen's successor. Sememiah was most likely the successor of Djehuty as overseer of the treasuries.
