= TT14 =

Theban Tomb

Coordinates: 25.7369°N 32.6242°E

Theban tomb TT14
- Burial site of Huy
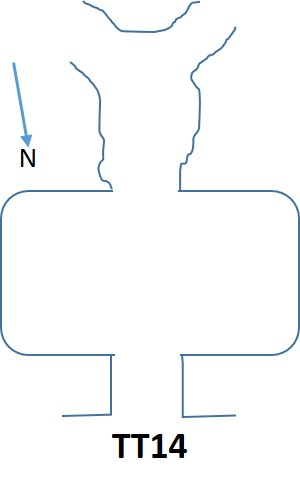

- Location within Egypt
- Location: Dra' Abu el-Naga', Theban Necropolis
- ← Previous; TT13 Next → TT15

F18 Y1 i i
Huy
in hieroglyphs
Era: New Kingdom
(1550–1069 BC)

The Theban Tomb TT14 is located in Dra' Abu el-Naga'. It forms part of the Theban Necropolis, situated on the west bank of the Nile opposite Luxor. The tomb is the burial place of the ancient Egyptian Huy, who was a wab-priest of Amenhotep, the favorite of Amun.

== See also ==
- List of Theban tombs
