= Tomb A.6 =

Lost Theban tomb

Theban tomb A.6
- Burial site of Dhjehutinefer, called Seshu
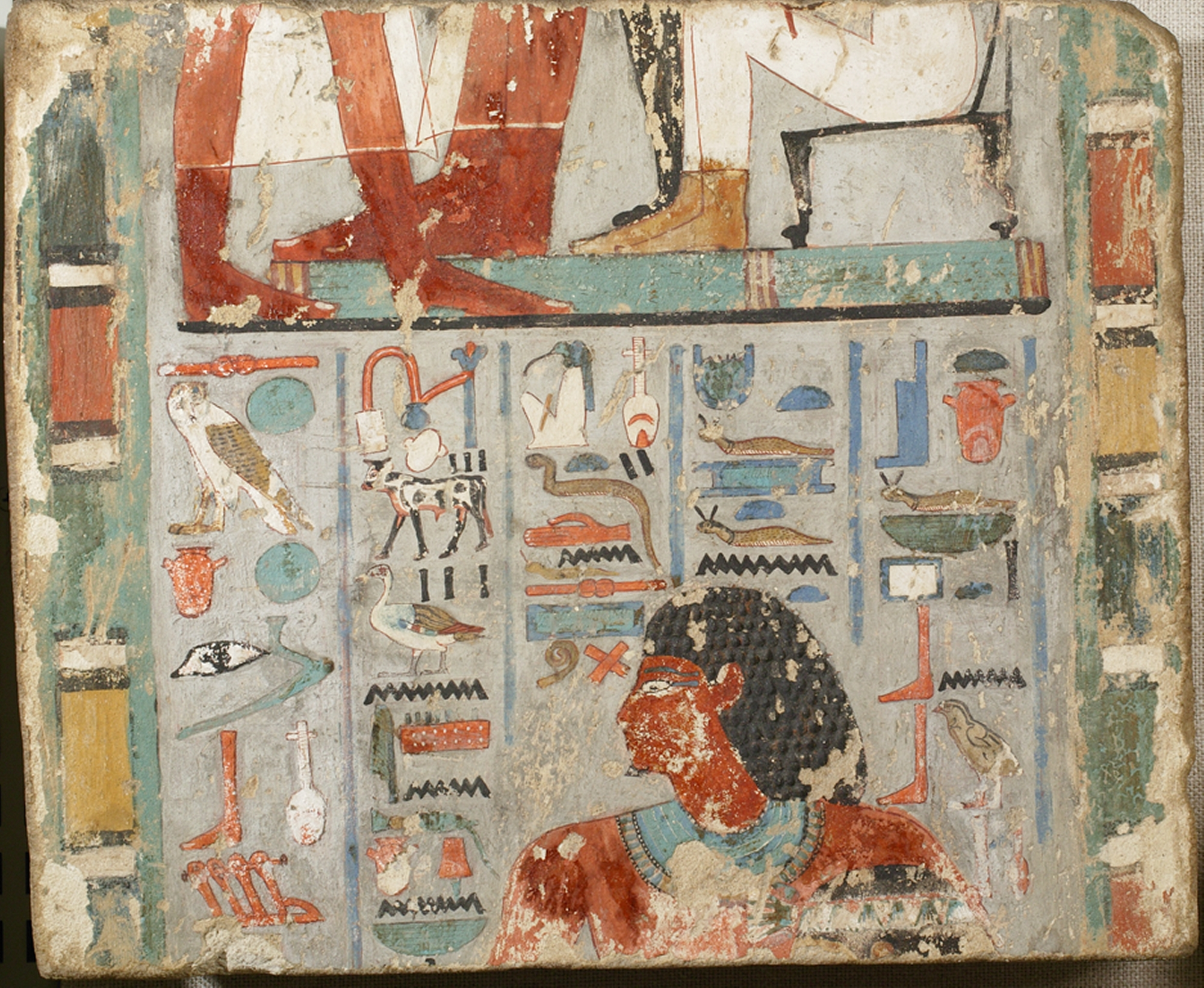
- Painting from tomb A.6

- Location within Egypt
- Location: Dra' Abu el-Naga', Theban Necropolis
- ← Previous; Tomb A.5 Next → Tomb A.7

Tomb A.6 is the modern number given to a now lost Theban tomb in Dra' Abu el-Naga'. The burial dates to the ancient Egyptian 18th Dynasty and belonged to the overseer of the marshland dwellers Dhjehutinefer, who is also called Seshu. The place was visited by the expedition of Karl Richard Lepsius, who copied the tomb owner's title overseer of the marshland dwellers of the lord of the two lands, but not the name. It seems that the tomb was then already heavily destroyed. Before 1906 the French Egyptologist Henri Gauthier visited A.6 and described the few remains of the decoration and published a short note. Gauthier recorded some further titles of Dhjehutinefer, such as scribe and counter of cattle and fowl of the temple of Amun. A fragment belonging to the tomb is a wall painting that is today in the Metropolitan Museum in New York. On the fragment in New York also mentioned the wife of Djehutinefer, a woman called Benbu. Several funerary cones belonging to the tomb are known. They provide the name of Djehutynefer's father who was the scribe Mesu.

== See also ==
- List of Theban Tombs
