= TT233 =

TT233 may refer to:

- a tomb of ancient Egypt
- a model of transmitter
- the designation for an airline scheduled flight, Tigerair Australia Flight TT233
