= Dra' Abu el-Naga =

Village and archaeological site in Egypt

Coordinates: 25°44′07″N 32°37′14″E

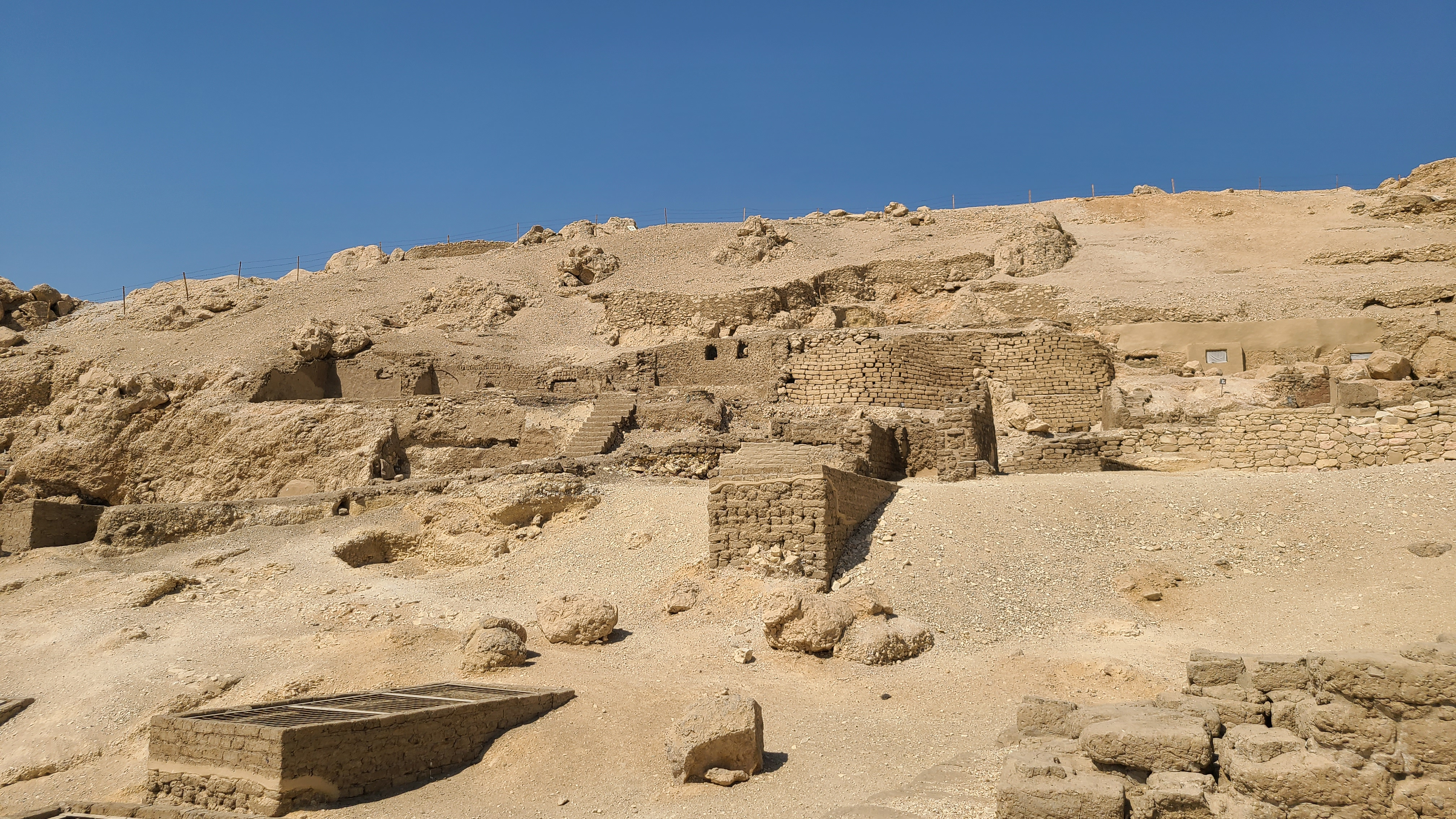
A view of the archaeological site of Dra' Abu el-Naga on the Luxor West Bank, Egypt

The necropolis of Draʻ Abu el-Naga (Arabic: دراع ابو النجا) is located on the West Bank of the Nile at Thebes, Egypt, just by the entrance of the dry bay that leads up to Deir el-Bahari and north of the necropolis of el-Assasif. The necropolis is located near the Valley of the Kings.

== History ==
According to the German Institute of Archeology or DAI, "Dra' Abu el-Naga is one of the longest occupied necropolis of Ancient Egypt: it was used as a burial place almost continuously between the Middle Kingdom and the early Christian (Coptic) periods, i.e. a period of ca. 2500 years. The oldest graves documented so far date to the end of the 11th dynasty (ca. 2000 B.C.). During the Seventeenth Dynasty and early 18th dynasty, kings and their families were interred here in small pyramid tombs such as Nubkheperre Intef, Sekhemre-Wepmaat Intef, Sobekemsaf I (strongly suspected), Ahhotep II and quite possibly both Amenhotep I and Ahmose-Nefertari in Tomb Tomb ANB. The social spectrum of the private necropolis ranges from simple burials with few grave goods to the burials of higher-ranking individuals e.g. the High Priests of Amun of Karnak and other high officials. In the early Middle Kingdom, at the end of the Second Intermediate Period and at the beginning of the New Kingdom Dra' Abu el-Naga was the site of the residence cemetery, as Thebes/Waset had at this time become the imperial capital and seat of government. Dra' Abu el-Naga's significance as a holy burial ground, which increased with the presence of the royal tomb complexes, resulted primarily from its position directly opposite the Temple of Karnak: The Temple of Karnak is known to have been the main cult centre of Amun from the Middle Kingdom and then became one of Ancient Egypt's most important temples during the New Kingdom."

During the Coptic eras, a monastery, Deir el-Bakhît, identified as the historical Theban Monastery of Saint Paulos, was built on the hilltop above the pharaonic cemetery.

== Excavation ==
=== Deir el-Bakhit ===
The DAI in cooperation with LMU Munich had been conducting work on the Deir el-Bakhit monastery from 2001 until at least 2004, under the direction of Prof. Dr. Günter Burkard and PD Dr. Daniel Polz.

=== Pharaonic-Era Tombs ===
According to the DAI, "Individual scenes from decorated graves, which are situated in the necropolis and date to the New Kingdom, were documented and published in 1845 during the course of the expedition led by Carl Richard Lepsius. By that point, many of the pharonic pyramids had been dismantled by stone robbers, leaving only the tombs behind. The first significant and to some extent documented excavations were undertaken by Joseph Passalacqua between 1822 and 1825 and concentrated on a number of shaft graves. Particular interest in Dra' Abu el-Naga came as a result of the discovery of three royal coffins of the Second Intermediate Period, one of which belonged to Nubkheperre Intef, which had been found by grave robbers in 1827 and then bought by the British Museum, London in 1835." (The other two coffins were for pharaoh Kamose and his wife Ahhotep II.)

"In the years 1860 to 1862 Auguste Mariette initiated the apparently successful search of the tomb of this king. Mariette however did not document the location of the tomb and only an extremely cursive short description exists today. At the end of the 19th and at the beginning of the 20th century a number of ventures were undertaken in Dra' Abu el-Naga, during the course of which individual graves and grave clusters were excavated and their decoration documented (e.g. Northampton/Spiegelberg/Newberry, 1898/99; H. Gauthier, 1906; Carter/Carnarvon, 1908; W.M.F. Petrie, 1909)."

Clarence Fisher of the University of Pennsylvania Museum led an excavation effort from 1921–1923. This included work "in the tombs of New Kingdom officials and the mortuary complex of the 18th Dynasty king Amenhotep I and his wife Nefertari (1525–1504 B.C.)" Lanny Bell continued work at this site in 1967 concentrating on "the epigraphic recording and conservation of the decorated rock-cut tombs of Dynasty 19 (1292–1190 B.C.)." The work at the site provided significant artifacts for the Museum including statuary, pottery funerary furnishings and painted reliefs.

From 1991 to 2000, the DAI in cooperation with the University of California Los Angeles undertook an excavation of the area "as, up until [then], little was known about the architecture and composition of graves and funerary practices of the Second Intermediate Period and early New Kingdom (13th 18th dynasty, ca. 1790–1425 B.C.)." They in particular wanted to focus on the royal tomb complexes of the 17th dynasty, because prior to their work, "the general knowledge of these tombs was based on individual objects, which were part of their funerary equipment, but which lacked any definite provenience (e.g. two gilded wooden coffins and a limestone pyramidion). Such objects were stolen from their tombs during the 19th century and then gradually found their way into the art trade and finally into various European collections. The burial complexes themselves and their exact location remained undocumented. Consequently one main objective was the localisation of these tombs, the recording of their architecture and the reconstruction of the original context of the objects, which formed part of their burial equipment."

Archeological work has been done in the area by the Spanish National Research Council in Madrid since January 2002. "The mission started focusing in and around the rock-cut tomb-chapels of Djehuty and Hery (TT 11 and 12), two high officials who served under Hatshepsut and Queen Mother Ahhotep respectively, ca. 1520–1460 BCE....in 2008 the Spanish mission discovered an 11th/early 12th Dynasty burial three feet (one meter) below the floor of the open courtyard of the tomb-chapel of Djehuty (TT 11), including a wooden coffin painted in red with a polychrome inscription along its four sides and the lid. The mummy of its owner, called Iqer, was resting on his left side, with three staves and two bows placed along his body." 20 funerary shafts, four mudbrick offering chapels, four more rock-cut tombs from the 11th/early 12th dynasty, and a 9x7 (3 meters x 2.2.meters) funerary garden have been unearthed since 2011. This garden, lined with silt and lime mortar, "combined plants associated with food offerings, together with other plants that probably had an aesthetic and/or symbolic use, to be presented to the deceased as a wish for life/rebirth."

In 2023, an Egyptian mission discovered in Dra' Abu el-Naga a burial chamber with the granite sarcophagus of vizier Ankhu from the early 13th Dynasty.

== Tombs and structures ==
=== Theban Necropolis ===
There are at least 415 cataloged tombs in the Theban Necropolis, of which Dra' Abu el-Naga is a part. Of these, the following are in Dra' Abu el-Naga specifically.

==== TT (Theban Tomb) 1 to 100 ====
- TT11 – Djehuty, overseer of the treasury under Queen Hatshepsut (18th Dynasty)
- TT12 Hery, Overseer of the Granary of Queen Ahhotep (17th Dynasty) or 18th Dynasty)
- TT13 – Shuroy, Chief of the Brazier-bearers of Amun (20th Dynasty)
- TT14 Huy, Priest of Amenhotep, the Image of Amun (19th Dynasty)
- TT15 Tetiky, son of Rahotep, mayor of Thebes (18th Dynasty)
- TT16 Panehsy, Prophet of Amenhotep of the Forecourt (19th Dynasty)
- TT17 Nebamun, Scribe and Physician of the King (18th Dynasty)
- TT18 Baki, Chief Weigher of the Gold of Amun (18th Dynasty)
- TT19 Amenmose, First Prophet of Amenhotep of the Forecourt (20th Dynasty)
- TT20 Montukherkhopshef, mayor of Busiris (18th Dynasty)

==== TT (Theban Tomb) 101 to 200 ====
- TT140 Kefia, also called Neferronpet, goldworker and portrait sculptor (18th Dynasty)
- TT141 Bakenkhons, wab-priest at the fore of Amun (Ramesside Period)
- TT142 Samut, overseer of works of Amun-Ra in Karnak (18th Dynasty)
- TT143 Unknown.
- TT144 Nu, overseer of estate labor (18th Dynasty)
- TT145 Nebamon, head of bowmen (18th Dynasty)
- TT146 Nebamon, overseer of the granary of Amun, counter of grain, iny of the God's Wife (18th Dynasty)
- TT147 possibly Heby. scribe who counts the cattle of Amun of Upper and Lower Egypt, Head Elder of the portal in Karnak
- TT148 Amenemopet, priest of Amun (Ramesside Period)
- TT149 Amenmose, royal scribe of the table of the Lord of the Two Lands, overseer of hunters of Amun (Ramesside Period)
- TT150 Userhet, overseer of cattle of Amun (18th Dynasty)
- TT151 Hety, scribe, counter of cattle of the God's Wife of Amun, steward of the God's Wife of Amun (18th Dynasty)
- TT152 Unknown. (originally built in the 18th Dynasty but usurped during the Ramesside Period.)
- TT153 Unknown.
- TT154 Tati, cupbearer (18th Dynasty)
- TT155 Intef, great herald of the kind (18th Dynasty)
- TT156 Pennesuttawy, captain of troops, governor of the South Lands (19th Dynasty)
- TT157 Nebwenenef, high priest of Amun (19th Dynasty)
- TT158 Thonefer, third prophet of Amun (20th Dynasty)
- TT159 Raia, fourth priest of Amun (20th Dynasty)
- TT160 Besenmut, true king's acquaintance (26th Dynasty)
- TT161 Nakht, bearer of floral offerings of Amun (18th Dynasty)
- TT162 Kenamon, mayor of Thebes, overseer of the granary of Amun (18th Dynasty)
- TT163 Amenemhat, mayor of Thebes, royal scribe (19th Dynasty)
- TT164 Intef, scribe of recruits (18th Dynasty)
- TT165 Nehemaway, goldsmith (18th Dynasty)
- TT166 Ramose, overseer of works in Karnak, overseer of cattle (late 18th Dynasty and early 19th Dynasty)
- TT167 Unknown.(18th Dynasty)
- TT168 Any, Divine Father clean of hands, chosen lector of the lord of the gods (19th Dynasty)
- TT169 Senena, head goldsmith of Amun (18th Dynasty)

==== TT (Theban Tomb) 201 to 300 ====
- TT231 Nebamun, scribe, counter of grain of Amun in the granary of divine offerings (18th Dynasty)
- TT232 Tharwas, scribe of the divine seal of the Amun treasury (Ramesside Period)
- TT233 Saroy and Amenhotep, Royal Scribe of the offering table of the Lord of the Two Lands, Royal Scribe of the king's repast, Keeper of the royal documents in the presence (of the king), Leader of the Festival, Cattle Counter in the Estate of Amun, Royal Messenger to the hill country, Overseer of the hunters of Amun (Ramesside Period)
- TT234 Roy, mayor (18th Dynasty)
- TT236 Hornakht, second prophet of Amun and overseer of the treasury of Amun (Ramesside Period)
- TT237 Wennefer, chief lector-priest (Ramesside Period)
- TT241 Ahmose, Scribe of divine writings, Child of the nursery, Head of the mysteries in the House of the morning (18th Dynasty)
- TT255 Roy, Royal Scribe, Steward of the estates of Horemheb and Amun (18th Dynasty)
- TT260 User, Scribe, Weigher of Amun, overseer of fields of Amun (18th Dynasty)
- TT261 Khaemwaset, wab-priest of Amenhotep I (18th Dynasty)
- TT262 Unknown. overseer of fields (18th Dynasty)
- TT282 Nakhtmin (Troop Commander) Head of the bowmen, Overseer of the South Lands (19th Dynasty)
- TT283 Roma, also called Roy, high priest of Amun (19th Dynasty)
- TT284 Pahemnetjer, scribe of offerings of all gods (Ramesside Period)
- TT285 Iny, head of the magazines of Mut (Ramesside Period)
- TT286 Niay, scribe of the table (Ramesside Period)
- TT287 Pendua, wab-priest of Amun (Ramesside Period)
- TT288 Bakenkhons, scribe of divine book of Khons (Ramesside Period)
- TT289 Setau, viceroy of Kush, overseer of the South Lands, chief bowman of Kush (19th Dynasty)
- TT293 Ramessesnakht, high priest of Amun (20th Dynasty)
- TT300 Anhotep, viceroy of Kush (19th Dynasty)

==== TT (Theban Tomb) 301 to 400 ====
- TT301 Hori, scribe of the table of Pharaoh in the Amun domain (Ramesside Period)
- TT302 Paraemheb, overseer of the magazine (Ramesside Period)
- TT303 Paser, head of the magazine of Amun, Third Prophet of Amun (Ramesside Period)
- TT304 Piay, scribe of the offering-table of Amun, scribe of the Lord of the Two Lands (Ramesside Period)
- TT305 Paser, wab-priest in front of Amun (Ramesside Period)
- TT306 Irdjanen, door-opener of the Amun domain (Ramesside Period)
- TT307 Thonefer (Ramesside Period)
- TT332 Penrenutet, chief watchman of the granary of the Amun domain (Ramesside Period)
- TT333 and TT334 both unknown. (18th Dynasty)
- TT344 Piay, overseer of the cattle (Ramesside Period)
- TT375, TT376, TT377, TT378, and TT379, all unknown (Ramesside Period)
- TT393 and TT396 unknown (18th Dynasty)
- TT394 and TT395 unknown (Ramesside Period)

==== TT (Theban Tomb) 401 to 415 ====
- TT401 Nebseni, overseer of goldsmiths of Amun (18th Dynasty)
- TT402 unknown (18th Dynasty)

=== Tombs discovered then became lost ===
- Tomb A.1 Amenemhet, ka-servant (18th Dynasty)
- Tomb A.2 "Tomb of the Dancers"
- Tomb A.3 Ruru, chief of the Medjay (New Kingdom)
- Tomb A.4 Si-User, scribe, mayor of the southern city, overseer of the granary (19th Dynasty)
- Tomb A.5 Neferhotep, overseer of granaries (18th Dynasty)
- Tomb A.6 Djehutinefer, overseer of marshlands of the Lord of the Two Lands (19th Dynasty)
- Tomb A.7 Amenhotep, scribe (18th Dynasty)
- Tomb A.8 Amenemhab, royal scribe, steward in the mansion of Amenhotep I on the west of Thebes (18th Dynasty or 19th Dynasty)
- Tomb A.9 unknown (18th Dynasty)
- Tomb A.10 Djehutynefer, overseer of the treasury (18th Dynasty)
- Tomb A.24 Simut, second priest of Amun

=== Kampp Tombs ===
These are tombs that have been discovered and excavated by Friederike Kampp-Seyfried and have been given their designation after her.

- Kampp 150, dating to around 18th Dynasty
- Kampp 157 Userhat dating to the 18th Dynasty containing eight mummies, 10 wooden sarcophagi and over 1000 ushabti.
- Kampp 161, estimated to be from the 18th Dynasty

=== Other tombs ===
- Tomb ANB Possible tomb of king Amenhotep I (second king of the 18th Dynasty) and his mother Ahmose-Nefertari.
- The lost tomb of Intef the Elder, a founding figure of the 11th Dynasty.
- The lost Tomb of Nebamun; scientific analysis in 2008–09 indicated the tomb's location somewhere in the vicinity of Dra' Abu el-Naga.
- Tomb of vizier Ankhu from the early 13th Dynasty.
- Neferhotep, findspot of the Papyrus Boulaq 18.
- It is possible that the complexes K93.11 and K93.12 could be attributed to king Amenhotep I and his mother Ahmose-Nefertari.
- The remains of the pyramid tomb of king Nubkheperre Intef (one of the last kings of the 17th Dynasty) were discovered and excavated in 2001. Evidence shows that it had originally been penetrated by tomb robbers in 1827.
- Tomb of a high court official of Nubkheperre Intef's named Teti.
- lost pyramid tomb of king Sobekemsaf I; a heart-scarab and a wooden canopic chest bearing the name are believed to originate from this lost tomb.
- lost pyramid tomb of king Sobekemsaf II; According to the Abbott Papyrus and the Leopold-Amherst Papyrus, which is dated to Year 16 of Ramesses IX, this king's royal pyramid tomb was violated and destroyed by tomb robbers.
- lost pyramid tomb of king Sekhemre-Wepmaat Intef; his pyramidion has been discovered and is now in the British Museum (BM EA 478).
- lost pyramid tomb of king Sekhemre-Heruhirmaat Intef; his coffin, which is now in the Louvre in France, is believed to originate from this lost tomb.
- lost pyramid tomb of king Senakhtenre Ahmose
- lost pyramid tomb of king Seqenenre Tao
- lost pyramid tomb of king Kamose
- lost pyramid tomb of king Ahmose I
- tomb of queen Ahhotep II found in 1859 here (17th and 18th Dynasty)

== Bibliography ==
- Marilina Betrò, Del Vesco Paolo, Gianluca Miniaci: Seven seasons at Dra Abu El-Naga. The tomb of Huy (TT 14): preliminary results, Progetti 3, Pisa 2009
- Polz, Daniel (2014) [2012]. "Topographical Archaeology in Dra' Abu el-Naga – Three Thousand Years of Cultural History". Mitteilungen des Deutschen Archäologischen Instituts. 68. Kairo: 115–134.
- André J. Veldmeijer, (with contributions by Daniel Polz & Ute Rummel), Sailors, Musicians and Monks. The Leatherwork from Dra‘ Abu el Naga (Luxor, Egypt), Sidestone Press, 2017 PDF
