= Imhotep (disambiguation) =

Imhotep (fl. 27th century BC) was an ancient Egyptian architect, physician, and court official.

Imhotep can also refer to:

== People ==
- Imhotep (vizier) (18th dynasty), an ancient Egyptian Vizier under Thutmose I
- Imhotep (pharaoh), an ancient Egyptian pharaoh.

== Arts and entertainment ==
- Imhotep (musician)
- Imhotep (The Mummy), a fictional character
- Imhotep (board game), designed by Phil Walker-Harding and published by Thames & Kosmos
- Imhotep (video game), computer game for the Commodore 64, released by Ultimate play the Game
- "Im-Ho-Tep (Pharaoh's Curse)", a song from the album Horror Show by Iced Earth
- A character in Agatha Christie's novel Death Comes as the End

== Space ==
- Imhotep (crater), a crater on Mercury
- 1813 Imhotep, a main-belt asteroid
- A flat region on the comet 67P/Churyumov–Gerasimenko

== Other uses ==
- Imhotep Institute Charter High School in Philadelphia, Pennsylvania
