= QV46 =

Ancient Egyptian tomb in the Valley of Queens

- Burial site of Imhotep
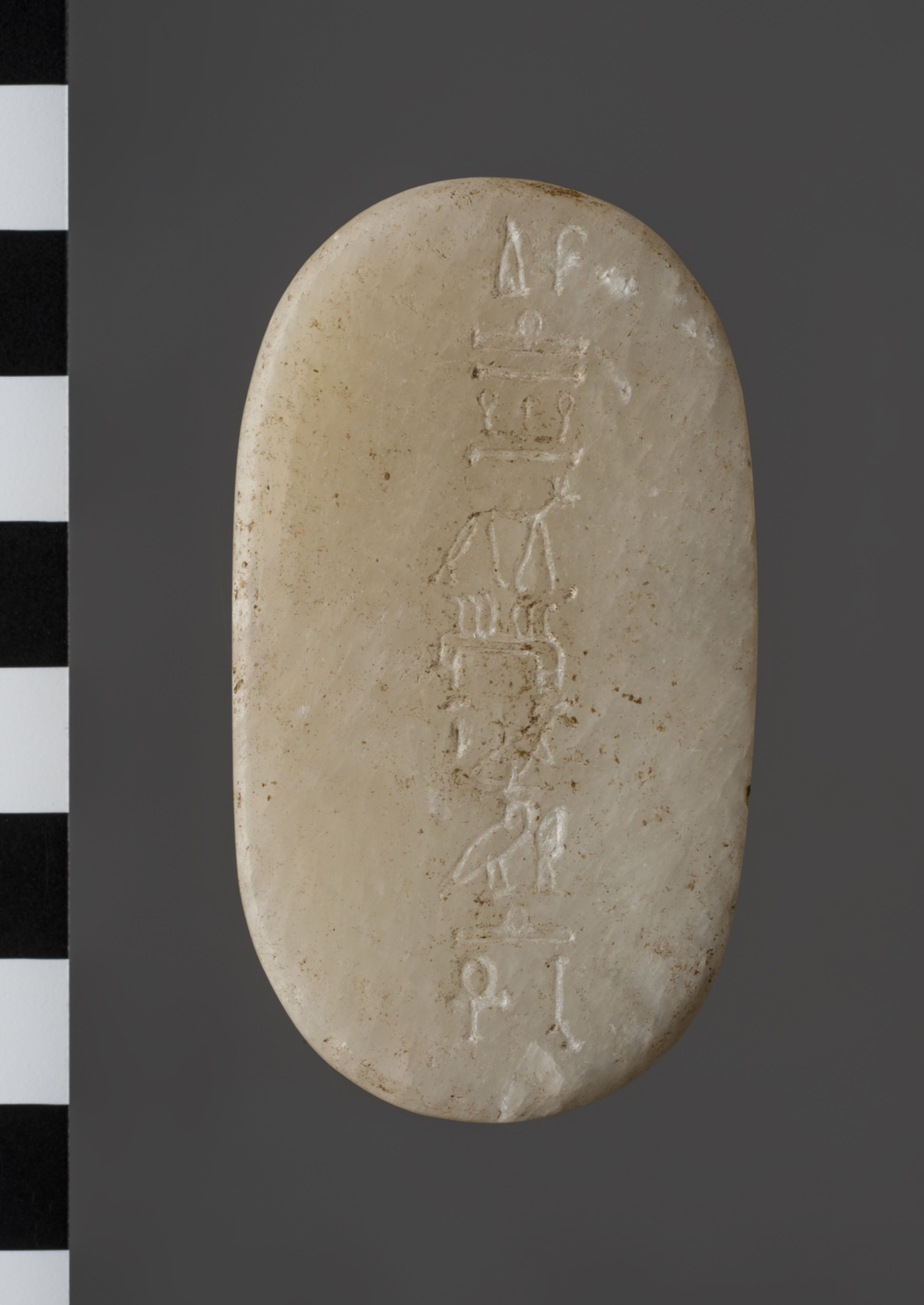
- Alabaster plaque inscribed with the name and titles of Imhotep, from the tomb; Museo Egizio, Turin.

- Location within Egypt
- Location: Valley of the Queens
- Excavated by: Ernesto Schiaparelli (1904)
- Decoration: Undecorated
- Layout: Shaft and burial chamber

QV46, also known as the Tomb of Imhotep, is a rock-cut tomb in the Valley of the Queens, within the Theban Necropolis on the west bank of the Nile opposite Luxor, Egypt. It was made in the early Eighteenth Dynasty for Imhotep, governor of Thebes, judge, and vizier under Thutmose I. The tomb lies on the southern side of the valley near the tomb of Princess Ahmose (QV47).

The tomb was discovered in 1904 by the Italian archaeological mission led by Ernesto Schiaparelli. Among the Eighteenth Dynasty tombs investigated by Schiaparelli's mission in the Valley of the Queens, it is one of the few whose owner can be identified with certainty or probability.

== Owner ==
Imhotep was governor of Thebes, judge, and vizier under Thutmose I. An inscription from a small temple built under Thutmose I for Prince Wadjmose also records Imhotep as governor of the city and tutor to the king's children.

His identification as the owner of QV46 is based chiefly on inscribed objects found in the tomb, including a canopic jar and an alabaster plaque bearing his name and titles.

== History ==
The Valley of the Queens began to be used as a burial ground between the end of the Seventeenth Dynasty and the beginning of the Eighteenth Dynasty. During this early phase it also contained burials of high-ranking officials and dignitaries; later, the cemetery was used mainly for women and children of the royal family. Imhotep's tomb belongs to this early phase and is dated to the reign of Thutmose I.

The tomb was robbed in antiquity. Schiaparelli found Imhotep's mummy stripped and broken into fragments, and observed that soil carried by rainwater had filled the shaft and chambers after robbers left the entrance open. Later investigations also recorded deposits resulting from subsequent flooding.

=== Excavation ===
The end of the Valley of the Queens during Schiaparelli's excavations. The shaft of Princess Ahmose's tomb (QV47), near Imhotep's tomb, is visible beside the path.

The tomb was discovered in 1904 by the Italian archaeological mission directed by Ernesto Schiaparelli. Schiaparelli and Francesco Ballerini worked in the Valley of the Queens during the 1903-1905 campaigns. The mission investigated at least 55 tombs in the main valley and its side valleys, 39 of them dating to the Eighteenth Dynasty. Only five or six yielded evidence allowing their owners to be identified with certainty or probability; Imhotep's tomb is one of them. Attribution of finds to individual tombs is not always straightforward because the QV numbering system had not yet been introduced and Schiaparelli's and Ballerini's notes do not always record provenance precisely.

Elizabeth Thomas documented the tomb in 1959-1960, when the shaft was again filled with debris. In 1984 a joint Franco-Egyptian mission cleared the tomb once more. The mission also found the feet of Imhotep's mummy and another mummified food offering in the form of a duck. Ramesside-period ostraca were also found near the entrance.

Between 2006 and 2008 the tomb was documented again as part of the Valley of the Queens project undertaken by the Getty Conservation Institute and the Supreme Council of Antiquities. In December 2009 the Supreme Council of Antiquities replaced the low dry-stone enclosure around the shaft opening with a masonry structure; the shaft is also protected by a metal grate.

== Description ==
The tomb opens on the south side of the road in the south-western branch of the Valley of the Queens, beside the retaining wall and west of the tomb of Princess Ahmose (QV47), daughter of Seqenenre Tao.

Schiaparelli described a shaft leading to two small irregular chambers arranged one beyond the other. The Getty Conservation Institute's 2016 report instead records a vertical shaft leading to a single burial chamber. Eighteenth Dynasty tombs in the valley generally have a simple plan consisting of a shaft and burial chamber, sometimes with one or two side chambers, and lack decoration and superstructures.

The shaft and chamber recorded by the Getty Conservation Institute are cut into heavily fractured shale. Extensive salt or gypsum deposits occur on the walls and along fractures in the rock. At the time of the Getty assessment, the structure was considered stable and showed no evidence of significant recent collapse, although erosion of the shaft was continuing. Its position at the base of the southern slope leaves it exposed to water and debris during floods; the report recommended grading the surfaces around the entrance and improving drainage to reduce this risk.

=== Finds ===
Alabaster canopic jar of Imhotep, from the tomb; Museo Egizio, Turin.

The excavation produced numerous elements of the funerary equipment, including an inscribed canopic jar, a fragment of a sarcophagus, and an oval alabaster plaque. The alabaster canopic jar now in the Museo Egizio in Turin was found in the tomb during Schiaparelli's 1904 excavation. The alabaster plaque bears Imhotep's name and titles and likewise comes from the tomb.

Schiaparelli also found fragments of several coffins. He described remains of an anthropoid coffin covered with gold leaf, a second rectangular cedar-wood coffin with incised inscriptions painted blue, and an outer coffin of bitumen-coated wood. From surviving fragments he further suggested that the mummy had worn a mask with gilded and blue elements. Other finds included fragments of a chest painted with yellow and blue bands for the canopic jars, a small box, a small seat, the lower part of a vessel, and a large basket.

A substantial part of the burial equipment consisted of mummified food offerings and their wooden containers. Schiaparelli described boxes coated with bitumen on the inside and painted white on the outside: some were shaped like ducks and contained small mummified birds, while others followed the shape of the cuts of meat they held. A study published in 2024 attributed 39 mummified food offerings and associated containers to Imhotep's tomb.

Among the finds are several containers for cuts of beef. Other boxes were shaped like ducks and contained remains of small birds, while some pieces of beef remained wrapped in linen.

Objects from the tomb in the Museo Egizio, Turin

Mummified food offering in its wooden container.

Wooden container for mummified meat.

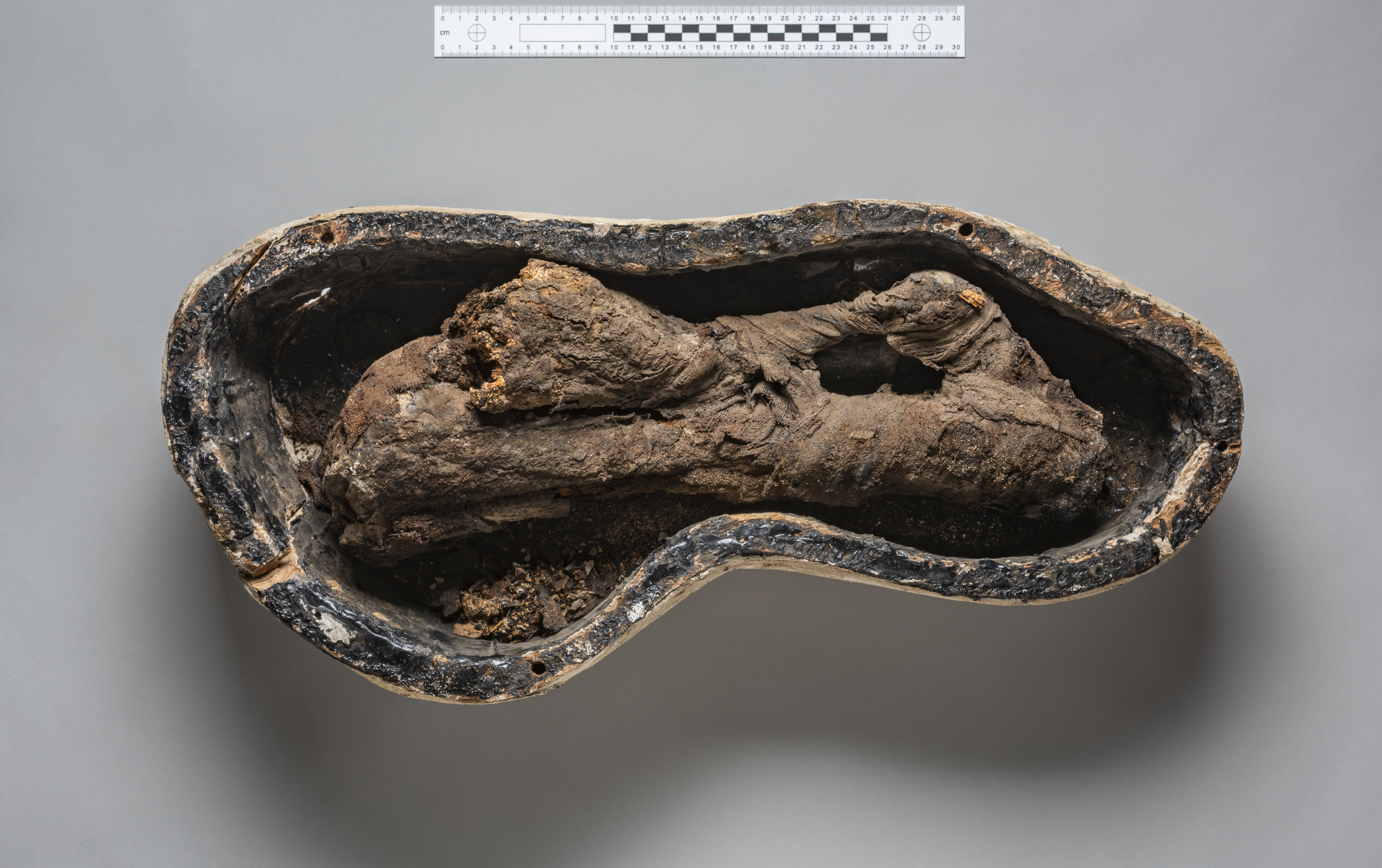
Mummified beef in its container.

Wooden container for mummified beef.

Mummified beef wrapped in linen.

== See also ==
- Animal mummy
- Ernesto Schiaparelli
- Museo Egizio
- Thutmose I
- Valley of the Queens

== Bibliography ==
- Demas, Martha; Agnew, Neville, eds. (2012). Valley of the Queens Assessment Report: Conservation and Management Planning (PDF). Vol. 1. Los Angeles: Getty Conservation Institute.
- Demas, Martha; Agnew, Neville, eds. (2016). Valley of the Queens Assessment Report: Assessment of 18th, 19th, and 20th Dynasty Tombs (PDF). Vol. 2. Los Angeles: Getty Conservation Institute.
- Gabler, Kathrin; Soliman, Daniel (2018). "P. Turin Provv. 3581: An Eighteenth Dynasty Letter from the Valley of the Queens in Context". Rivista del Museo Egizio. 2: 1–26. doi:10.29353/rime.2018.1671.
- Ikram, Salima; Aicardi, Sara; Facchetti, Federica, eds. (2024). The Animal Mummies of the Museo Egizio, Turin. Studi del Museo Egizio. Vol. 5. Turin and Modena: Museo Egizio and Franco Cosimo Panini. ISBN 9788857020136.
- Schiaparelli, Ernesto (1924). Esplorazione della "Valle delle Regine" nella necropoli di Tebe. Relazione sui lavori della Missione Archeologica Italiana in Egitto (anni 1903-1920). Vol. 1. Turin: Casa Editrice Giovanni Chiantore. doi:10.11588/diglit.55348.
