= TT168 =

Theban tomb

Theban tomb TT168
- Burial site of Any
- Location within Egypt
- Location: Dra' Abu el-Naga', Theban Necropolis
- ← Previous; TT167 Next → TT169

A n Z2 i i
Any
in hieroglyphs
Era: New Kingdom
(1550–1069 BC)

The Theban Tomb TT168 is located in Dra' Abu el-Naga'. It forms part of the Theban Necropolis, situated on the west bank of the Nile opposite Luxor. The tomb is the burial place of the ancient Egyptian Any (or Anuy), who was a God's Father of Amun and a Chosen lector of the Lord of the Gods during the reign of Ramesses II in the Nineteenth Dynasty.

The inner room of the tomb contains remains of painted scenes, and a text appears on the frieze. Any (or Anuy) appears with his wife Mery(t)nub, who is a singer of Amun in Karnak.

== See also ==
- List of Theban tombs
