= Tomb A.24 =

Lost Theban tomb

Theban tomb A.24
- Burial site of Simut
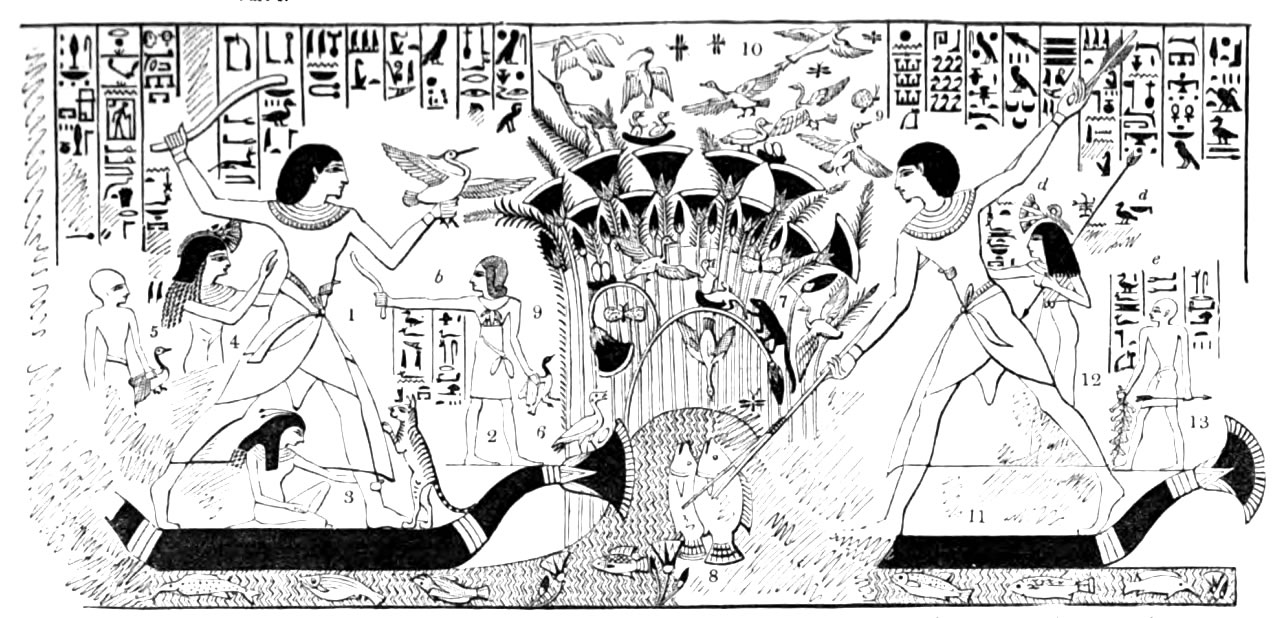
- Painting from tomb A.24

- Location within Egypt
- Location: Dra' Abu el-Naga', Theban Necropolis
- ← Previous; Tomb A.23 Next → Tomb A.25

Tomb A.24 is the modern number given to a now-lost Theban tomb in Dra' Abu el-Naga'. The burial dates to the ancient Egyptian 18th Dynasty and belongs to the second priest of Amun Simut. The tomb was already known in the early 19th century and was visited by several early travelers, such as Jean-François Champollion and John Gardner Wilkinson. Especially the latter made several copies of the painted decoration. He seems to have seen the tomb in a fairly good state of preservation while it was already more destroyed when Jean-François Champollion came later. He copied some inscriptions. Several scenes can be reconstructed from these early accounts. There was a depiction showing the family of Simut receiving offerings, most likely in connection with a Valley Festival festival. A second scene shows the family of Simut hunting in the marshes. John Gardner Wilkinson drew the scene and later published it. A third scene must have shown vintage. Wilkinson only copied a minor detail. Another scene shows Simut in front of scribes, men weighing, and Nubians bringing tribute. The scene most likely relates to the office of Simut, who also looked after the magazines of the Temple of Amun in Karnak.

== See also ==
- List of Theban Tombs
