= Kampp 161 =

Ancient Egyptian tomb in the Dra' Abu el-Naga' necropolis, Thebes

Kampp 161 is an ancient Egyptian tomb located in the Dra' Abu el-Naga' necropolis in Thebes, one of Egypt's ancient capitals. If compared with similar tombs in the region based on style and architecture, it would probably date back to the reigns of Amenhotep II or Thutmose IV of the Eighteenth Dynasty.

== History of archaeological work ==
The tomb is known at least since the 1990s. It was registered as "Kampp 161" by Friederike Kampp-Seyfried during her survey in the years 1988/89. The tomb was heavily buried under debris at that time, so only a few features were visible like the open courtyard with a surrounding wall built from limestone blocks. According to her the tomb is to be dated to the 18th Dynasty, maybe to the reign of Thutmosis III.

On December 9, 2017, the Ministry of State of Antiquities announced that the tomb, along with Kampp 150, was cleared from debris by a team of Egyptian archeologists.

=== Wall decorations ===
A colourful but not entirely finished mural depicting an individual presenting offerings to the deceased owner of the tomb and probably his wife at a banquet with family members and friends was found on the western wall of the tomb.

=== Finds ===
A decorated coffin and wooden funerary masks were also found.

== Bibliography ==
F. Kampp, Die thebanische Nekropole. Zum Wandel des Grabgedankens von der XVIII. bis zur XX. Dynastie, Theben 13.1-2 (Mainz 1996), Vol. II, p. 712 (ISBN 3-8053-1506-6)
