= TT11 =

Ancient Egyptian tomb

Coordinates: 25.7333°N 32.6000°E

Theban tomb TT11
- Burial site of Djehuty
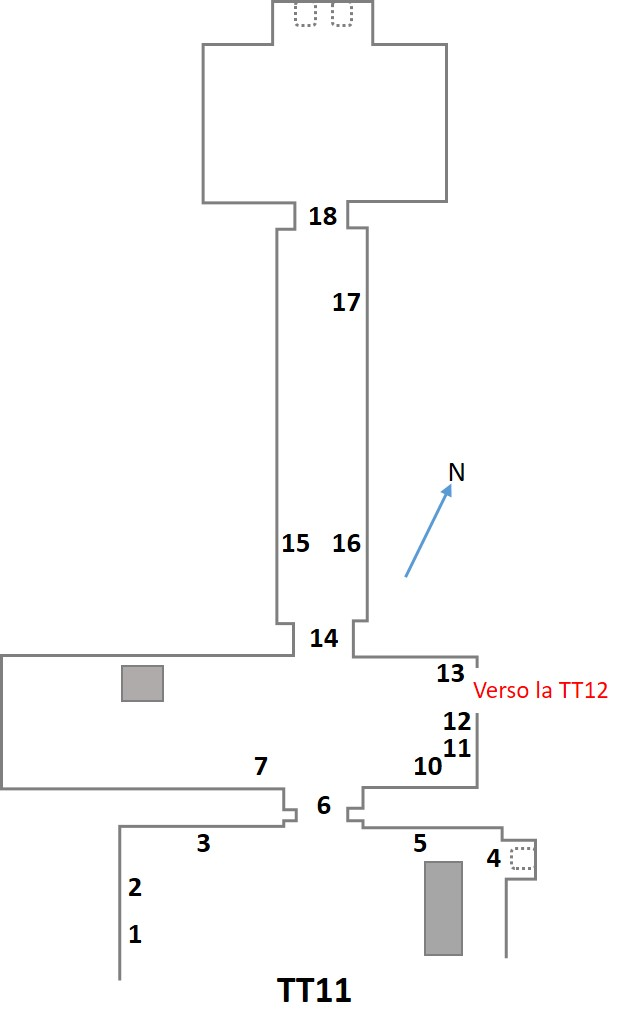

- Location within Egypt
- Location: Dra' Abu el-Naga', Theban Necropolis
- ← Previous; TT10 Next → TT12

G26 t Z4
Djehuty
in hieroglyphs
Era: New Kingdom
(1550–1069 BC)

The Theban Tomb TT11 is located in Dra' Abu el-Naga', part of the Theban Necropolis, on the west bank of the Nile, opposite to Luxor. It is the burial place of the ancient Egyptian Djehuty, who was Overseer of Treasury and of Works, during the 18th Dynasty reign of Hatshepsut.

The tomb is located near to TT12, connected to it by a third tomb, TT399. Recent excavations have discovered a Middle Kingdom burial of a man known as Iker, located within the courtyard of TT11. A Spanish mission working at Dra Abu El-Naga on the West Bank at Luxor has discovered a second, painted burial chamber. The chamber is decorated on two of its walls, mostly with texts from the Book of the Dead. An image of the goddess Nut adorns the ceiling.

== See also ==
- List of Theban tombs
