= Shuroy =

The ancient Egyptian Shuroy lived during the 20th Dynasty. He was buried in a tomb in the necropolis of Dra' Abu el-Naga' on the west bank of the Nile, opposite Thebes. His titles included Head of Brazier-bearers of Amun.
