= TT233 (tomb) =

Theban tomb

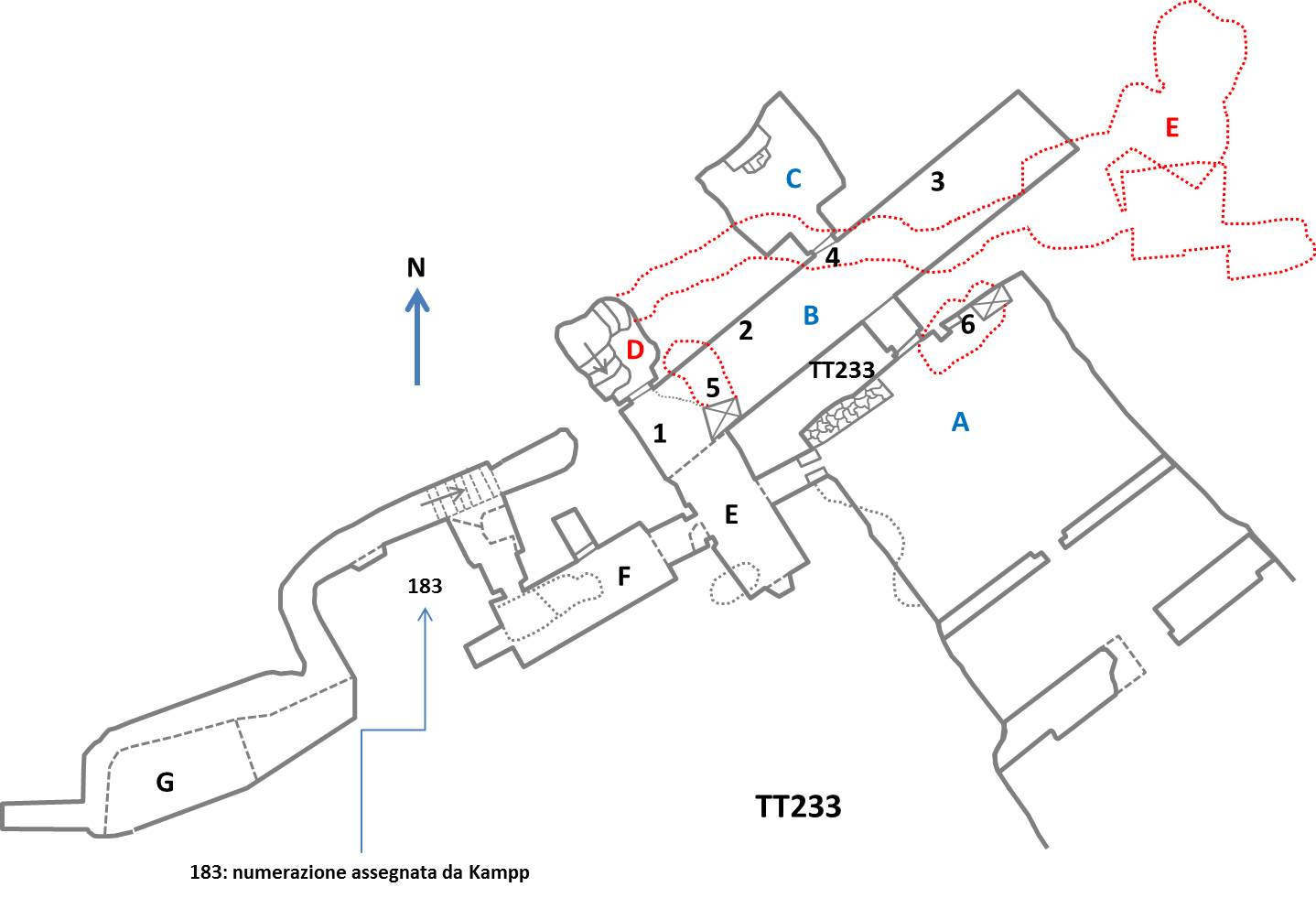
TT233 (tomb)

TT233 is the tomb of Saroy and Amenhotep located at Dra Abu El Naga in Egypt

The tomb contains much more textual information than images, and in comparison to other tombs, some of the text found within TT233 is found only within this tomb (Ockinga 2012).

The tomb was excavated by the Macquarie Theban Tombs project. Christian Monks lived at the location of the tomb during the late Roman and early Islamic period, which falls within a time-scale beginning from approximately 250 to 450 to post the early years of the 7th century A.D.

== See also ==
- List of Theban tombs
