= TT127 =

Theban tomb

Theban tomb TT127
- Burial site of Sememiah and Piay and Pairy
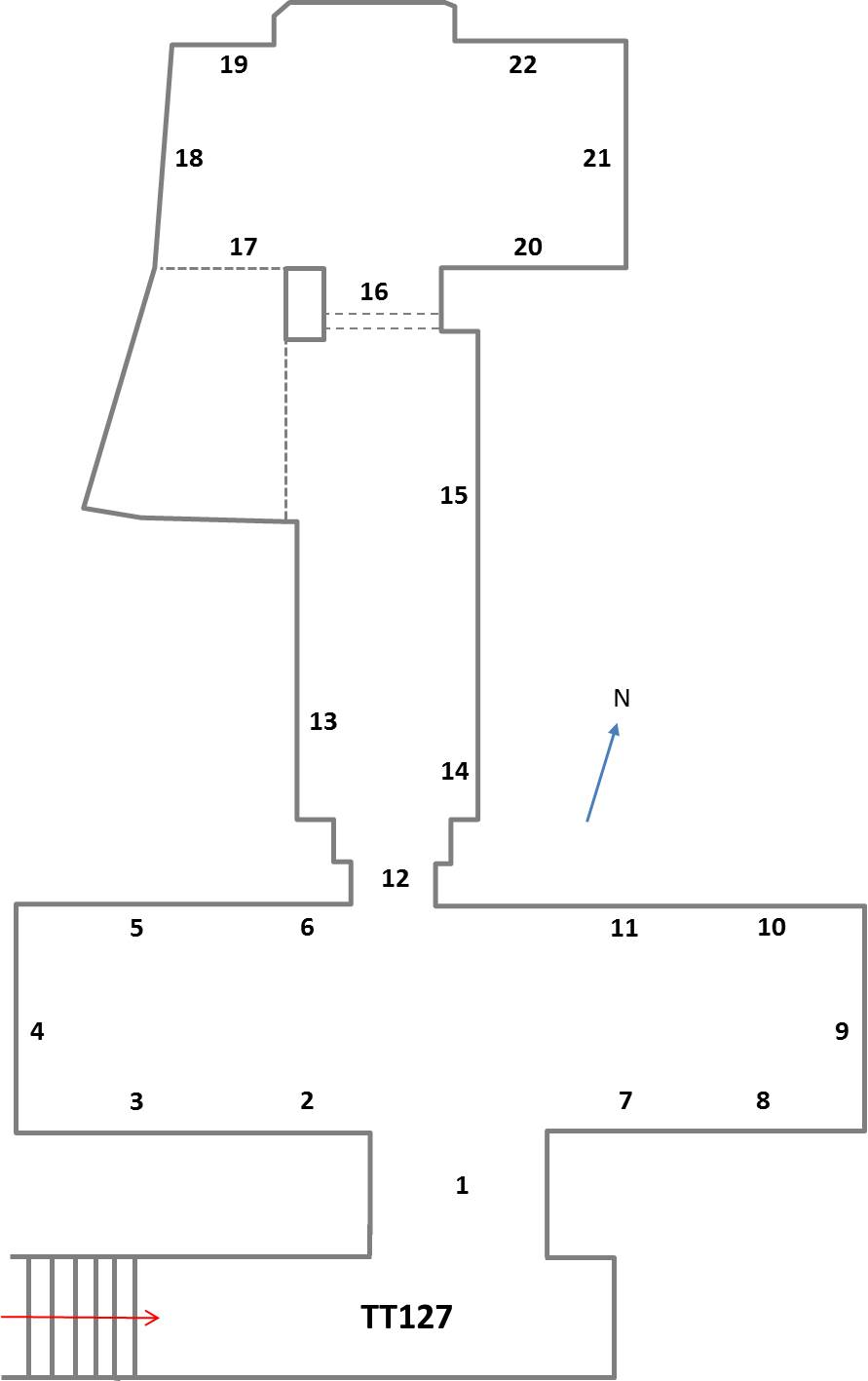

- Location within Egypt
- Location: Sheikh Abd el-Qurna, Theban Necropolis
- ← Previous; TT126 Next → TT128

The Theban Tomb TT127 is located in Sheikh Abd el-Qurna, part of the Theban Necropolis, on the west bank of the Nile, opposite to Luxor.

The tomb belongs to an 18th Dynasty ancient Egyptian named Sememiah, who was a royal scribe and overseer of the treasuries during the reigns of Hatshepsut and Thutmosis III. It was later usurped and extended by Piay and Pairy, during the Ramesside period.

== See also ==
- List of Theban tombs
