= El Qattah =

Village in Giza Governorate, Egypt

Coordinates: 30°13′N 30°58′E

El Qattah, also known as Qattah or El-Qattah, is an ancient Egyptian site in Lower Egypt, roughly 10 miles northwest of Letopolis. It is noted for its tombs of the Middle Kingdom, and was excavated extensively in 1904 by a team from the Institut Français d'Archéologie Orientale of Cairo, a team which included Henri Gauthier. One of the chambers at the site contained texts from the Book of the Dead. The Tomb of Néha was discovered here. In 1906 it was reported that a modern village is located here.
