= Ravel (crater) =

Crater on Mercury

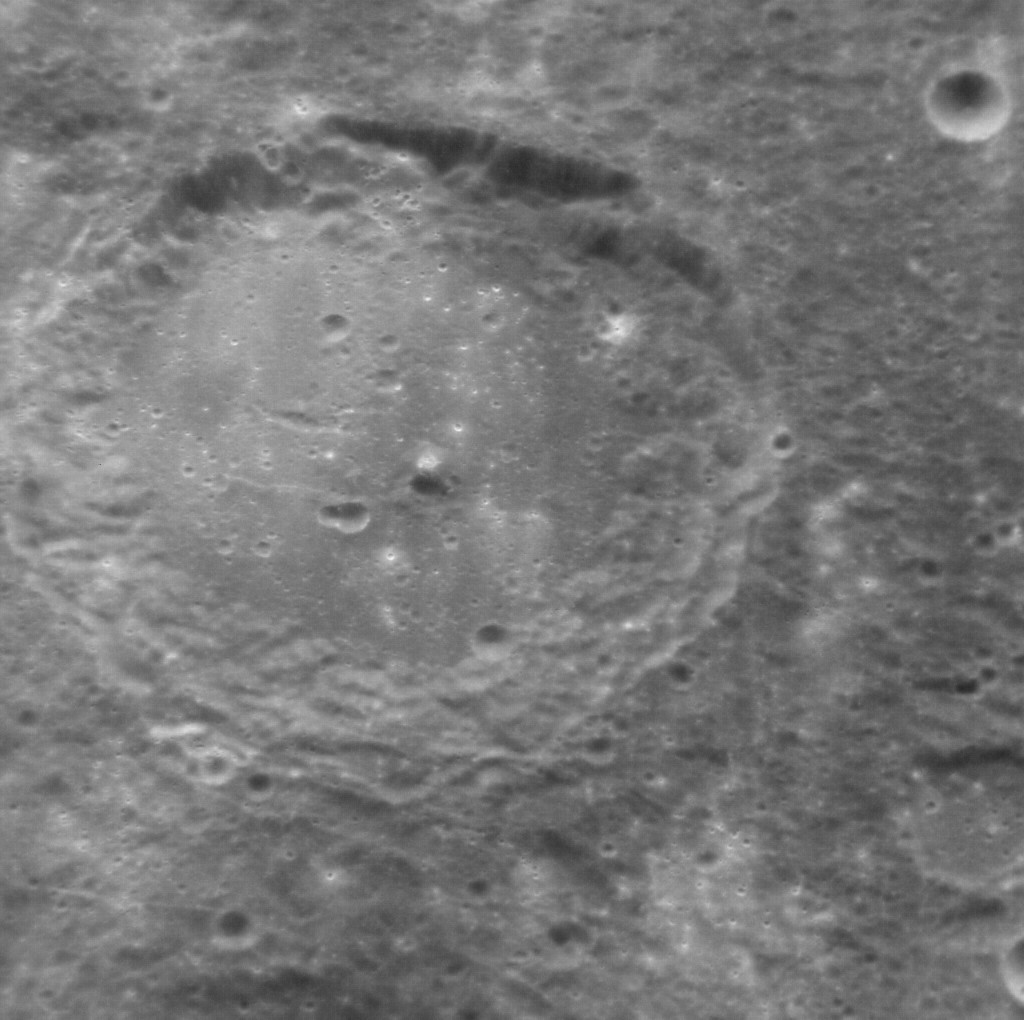
- Oblique MESSENGER NAC image
- Planet: Mercury
- Coordinates: 12.01°S 38.19°W
- Quadrangle: Kuiper
- Diameter: 78 km (48 mi)
- Eponym: Maurice Ravel

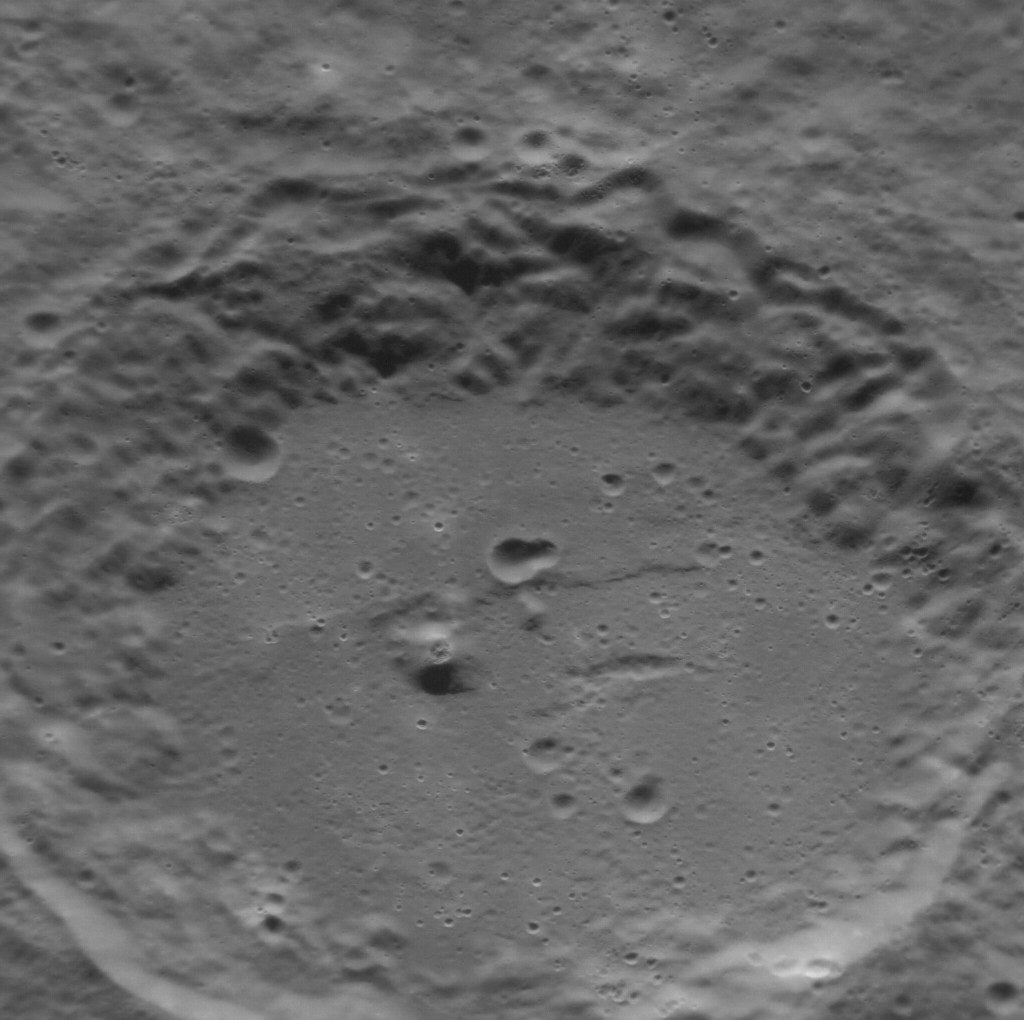
Another MESSENGER view

Ravel is a crater on Mercury. Its name was adopted by the International Astronomical Union (IAU) in 1985, after the French composer Maurice Ravel.

Ravel is west of the bright crater Kuiper and north of Imhotep.
