= TT13 =

Theban Tomb

Coordinates: 25.7333°N 32.6000°E

Theban tomb TT13
- Burial site of Shuroy
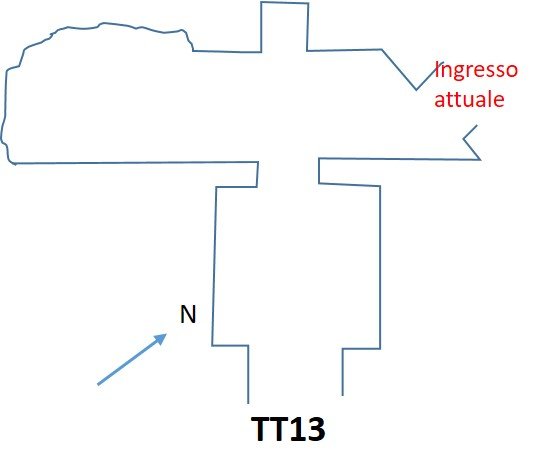

- Location within Egypt
- Location: Dra' Abu el-Naga', Theban Necropolis
- ← Previous; TT12 Next → TT14

H6 w r Z1 i i
Shuroy
in hieroglyphs
Era: New Kingdom
(1550–1069 BC)

The Theban Tomb TT13 is located in Dra' Abu el-Naga', part of the Theban Necropolis, on the west bank of the Nile, opposite to Luxor. It is the burial place of the ancient Egyptian Shuroy, who was Head of Brazier-bearers of Amun.

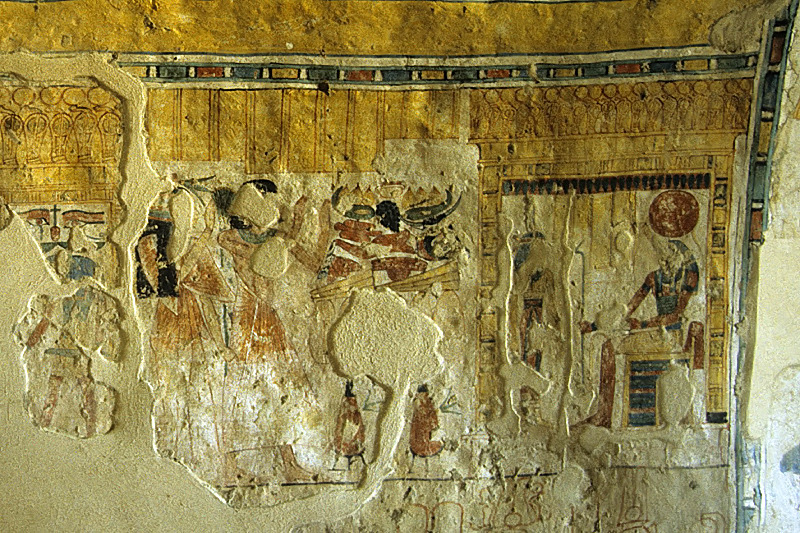
Shuroy and his wife giving offerings to Maat and Ra-Horakhty

== See also ==
- List of Theban tombs
- N. de Garis Davies, Nina and Norman de Garis Davies, Egyptologists
