= Panehsy (TT16) =

The ancient Egyptian Panehsy was Prophet of Amenhotep (I) of the Forecourt, during the reign of Ramesses II. Panehsy was buried in a tomb, TT16, in the Dra' Abu el-Naga' area of the Theban Necropolis.
