= Gianluca Miniaci =

Italian Egyptologist

Gianluca Miniaci is an Italian Egyptologist, currently Associate Professor at the University of Pisa.

He studied from 1999 to 2004 Classical Archaeology and wrote his dissertation in Egyptology on "The royal necropolis of the 17th dynasty at Dra Abu el-Naga (Thebes west)". This work received an honor. In 2008 he finished his PhD in Egyptian Archaeology at the University of Pisa, titled "The funerary culture at the end of the Second Intermediate Period: the emergence of the rishi coffin style". He continued his academic formation in London, Institute of Archaeology, UCL and in Paris, École Pratique des Hautes Études, EPHE, thanks to two Individual Marie Curie Fellowships. He worked in the most renowned museums, as the British Museum and the Musée du Louvre.

Miniaci is directing an archaeological mission in the site of Zawyet el-Maiyitin (Menya, Egypt) and he is deputy-director of the University of Pisa excavation at Thebes, in the cemetery of Dra Abu el-Naga. He is editor-in-chief of the international series "Middle Kingdom Studies", Golden House Publications, of the "Journal of Egyptian History", Brill-Leiden, and of the series "Ancient Egypt in Context" (together with Juan Carlos Moreno Garcia and Anna Stevens), from the Cambridge University Press.

Miniaci is the author of several books and more than 80 articles, including: The Middle Kingdom Ramesseum Papyri Tomb and its Archaeological Context (a study of the famous group of the Middle Kingdom Ramesseum tomb where a large batch of papyri had been found in the Nineteenth century), Rishi Coffins and the funerary culture of Second Intermediate Period Egypt (a study of the Egyptian rishi coffins of the Second Intermediate Period) and Lettere ai morti nell'Egitto antico e altre storie di fantasmi.

== Works ==
- G. Miniaci: Il tesoro perduto della regina Ahhotep. Una donna alla riconquista dell'Egitto antico, (Carocci, 2025) ISBN 9788829028351
- G. Miniaci, W. Grajetzki: The World of the Middle Kingdom III: Volume III, (Middle Kingdom Studies 12) ISBN 9781906137748
- (together with Peter Lacovara (eds), The Treasure of the Egyptian Queen Ahhotep and International Relations at the Turn of the Middle Bronze Age (1550 BCE), London 2022 ISBN 9781906137724
- The Middle Kingdom Ramesseum Papyri Tomb and its Archaeological Context, Kitab – Egyptology in Focus 1, London: Nicanor Books, 2020, ISBN 978-1838118006
- (with Juan Carlos Moreno García, Stephen Quirke & Andréas Stauder): The Arts of Making in Ancient Egypt, Voices, images, and objects of material producers 2000–1550 BC, Sidestone. Leiden, ISBN 9789088905230
- (with Marilina Betrò and Stephen Qurike), Company of Images: Modelling the Imaginary World of Middle Kingdom Egypt (2000-1500 BC). Proceedings of the International Conference of the EPOCHS Project held 18th-20th September 2014 at UCL, London, OLA 262, Leuven-Paris-New York: Peeters, 2017, ISBN 978-90-429-3495-5
- G. Miniaci, W. Grajetzki: The World of Middle Kingdom Egypt (2000-1550 BC), Vol. II, MKS 2, London: GHP, 2016, ISBN 9781906137489
- G. Miniaci, W. Grajetzki: The World of Middle Kingdom Egypt (2000-1550 BC), Vol. I, MKS 1, London: GHP, 2015, ISBN 978-1906137434
- Lettere ai morti nell'Egitto antico e altre storie di fantasmi, Brescia: Paideia Editrice, 2014, ISBN 978-8839408600
- (with Marilina Betrò), Talking along the Nile. Ippolito Rosellini, travellers and scholars of the 19th century in Egypt. Proceedings of the International Conference held on the occasion of the presentation of Progetto Rosellini. Pisa, June 14–16, 2012, Pisa: Pisa University Press, 2013, ISBN 886-74-1128-4
- Rishi Coffins and the Funerary Culture of Second Intermediate Period Egypt (GHP Egyptology 17), London: GHP, 2011, ISBN 978-1906137243
- (with Paolo Del Vesco, Marilina Betrò), Seven Seasons at Dra Abu El-Naga. The tomb of Huy (tt14): preliminary results, Pisa: Pisa University Press, 2009, ISBN 978-8884926036
- La guerra e i suoi riflessi nelle società antiche. Atti del convegno del dottorato di orientalistica università di Pisa 26-27 giugno 2007, Pisa: ETS, 2009, ISBN 978-8846720337
