= TT12 =

Theban Tomb

Coordinates: 25.7333°N 32.6000°E

Theban tomb TT12
- Burial site of Hery
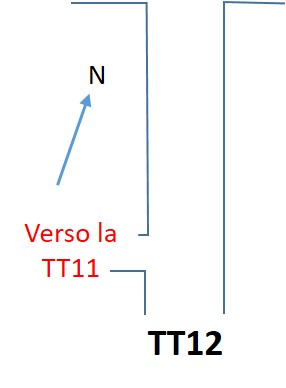

- Location within Egypt
- Location: Dra' Abu el-Naga', Theban Necropolis
- ← Previous; TT11 Next → TT13

D2 r Z4 N1 i i
Hery
in hieroglyphs
Era: New Kingdom
(1550–1069 BC)

The Theban tomb TT12 is located in Dra' Abu el-Naga', part of the Theban Necropolis, on the west bank of the Nile, opposite to Luxor. It is the burial place of the ancient Egyptian Hery, who was Overseer of the Granary of the King's Mother Ahhotep, during the reigns of Seqenenre Tao II to Amenhotep I.

The tomb is located near to TT11, connected to it by a third tomb, TT399.

Hery (also written as Hray) was the son of a lady named Ahmose. A son named Ahmose is shown offering to his father. Other children are shown including daughters Bakamun and Tjentnub and another son named Amenmes.

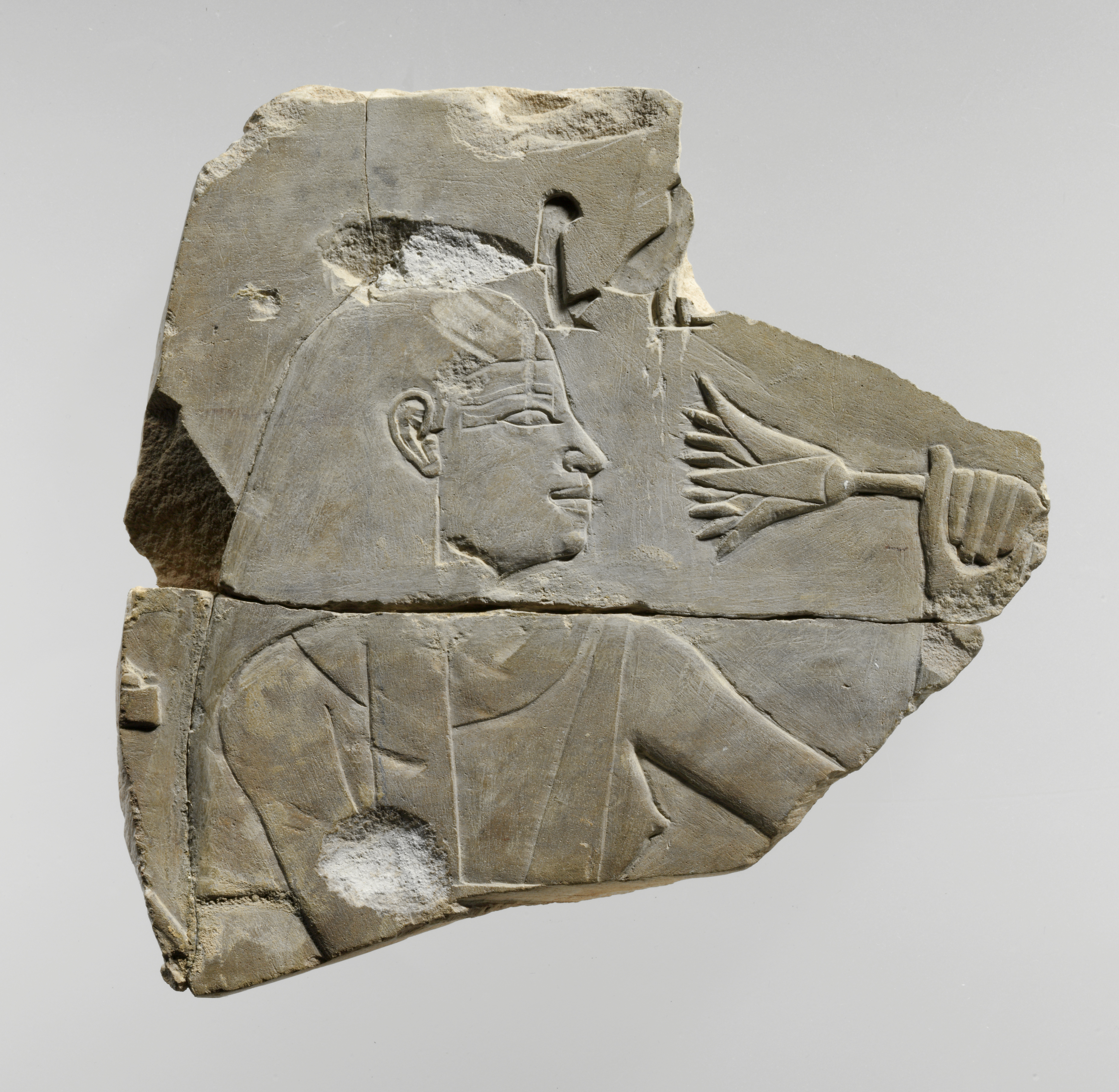
Mesu smelling a lotus, from the Metropolitan Museum of Art.

== See also ==
- List of Theban tombs
