= TT159 =

Ancient Egyptian tomb

Theban tomb TT159
- Burial site of Raia and Mutemwia
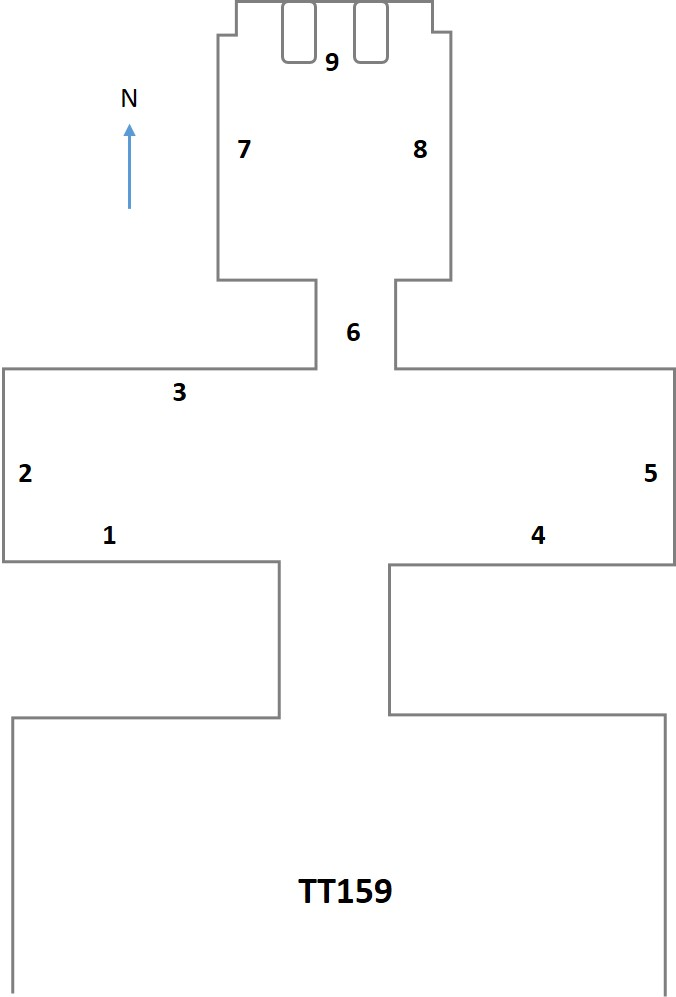
- Plan of TT159
- Location: Dra' Abu el-Naga', Theban Necropolis

The Theban Tomb TT159 is located in Dra' Abu el-Naga', part of the Theban Necropolis, on the west bank of the Nile, opposite to Luxor.

== History ==
TT159 belongs to the ‘fourth Prophet of Amun’ Raia and his wife Mutemwia, and dates to the 19th Dynasty. TT159 is a T-shaped tomb that includes a forecourt, transverse hall, and a shrine that once held a statue of the seated couple.

== Excavation and conservation ==
From January 2015 to June 2017, TT159 was one of the two tombs selected for conservation by the American Research Center in Egypt, working on behalf of the Egyptian Ministry of Tourism and Antiquities under a grant from the USAID."As part of the project, the entrance of the tomb was rebuilt, and the painted wall and ceilings inside were cleaned and preserved. The team also found and filled a large crack that had formed over the main hall."
