= Henri Gauthier =

French Egyptologist and geographer (1877–1950)

Henri Louis Marie Alexandre Gauthier (19 September 1877 – 1950) was a French Egyptologist and geographer. In 1903 he entered the French Institute of Oriental Archaeology of Cairo. He made extensive excavations at Dra Abu el-Naga and El Qattah (1904), and devoted himself to work on both historical and geographical issues of Ancient Egypt. In 1909 he was part of a French team which discovered Huni's Pyramid in Elephantine, and discovered a large granite conical object with an inscription revealing the name of the pharaoh Huni of the 3rd dynasty of the Old Kingdom. Gauthier worked with Gaston Maspero who asked him to copy the inscriptions of the Nubian temples of Amada, Kalabsha and Wadi es-Sebua.

== Geographic Dictionary ==
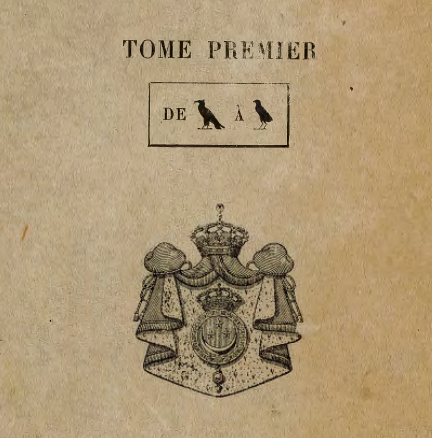

The Dictionnaire des noms Géographiques Contenus dans les Textes Hiéroglyphiques is of seven volumes.

- I. 𓄿 to 𓅱
- II. 𓃀 to 𓆑
- III. 𓅓 to 𓂋
- IV. 𓉔 to 𓄡
- V. 𓋴 to 𓎼
- VI. 𓏏 to 𓆓
- VII. Index
