= Tomb A.5 =

Lost Theban tomb

Theban tomb A.5
- Burial site of Neferhotep
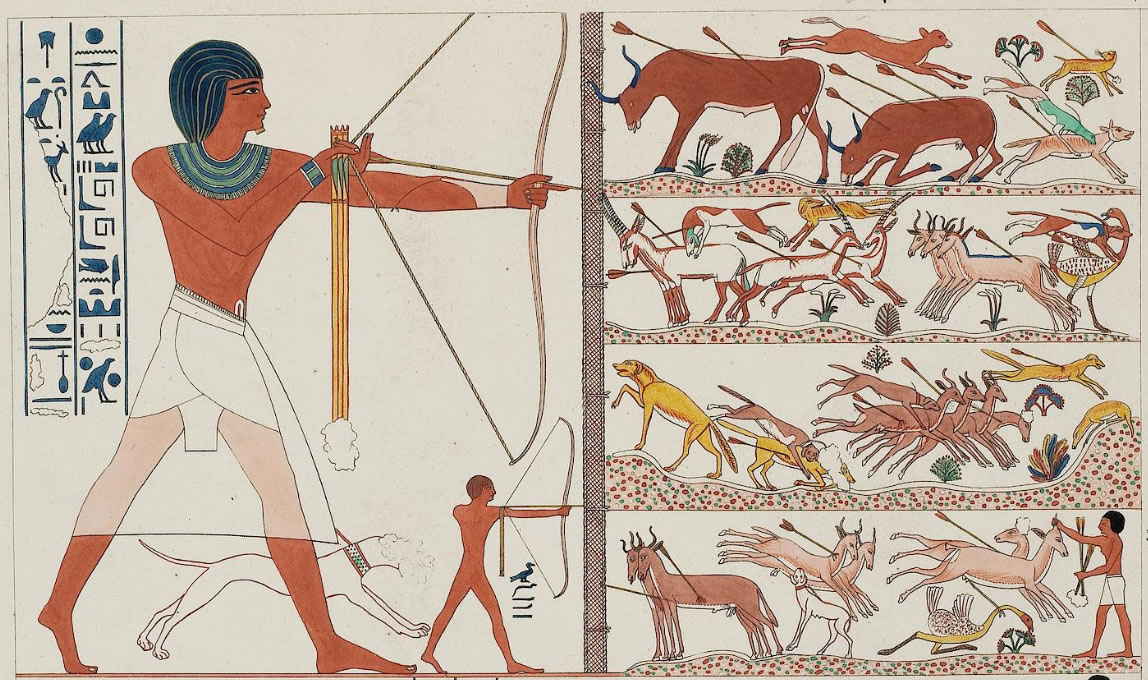
- Hunting in the desert, scene from tomb of Neferhotep

- Location within Egypt
- Location: Dra' Abu el-Naga', Theban Necropolis
- ← Previous; Tomb A.4 Next → Tomb A.6

Tomb A.5 is the modern number given to a now lost Theban tomb in Dra' Abu el-Naga'. The burial dates to the Ancient Egyptian 18th Dynasty and belonged to the overseer of the granary of the Lord of the Two Lands, Neferhotep. The tomb was visited by the French traveller Frédéric Cailliaud, who copied and published several scenes. Evidently, he saw the tomb in a fairly good condition and was described by others as superb. The location of the tomb got lost within the Nineteenth century. According to the old drawings published., there are several scenes depicted in the tomb. These include both hunting in the marshes and hunting in the desert, a banquet, and scenes showing vintage and agriculture.

== See also ==
- List of Theban Tombs
