= TT16 =

Theban tomb

Coordinates: 25.7333°N 32.6000°E

Theban tomb TT16
- Burial site of Panehsy
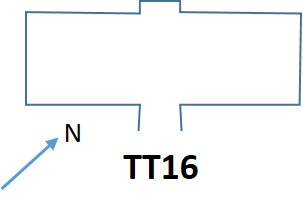

- Location within Egypt
- Location: Dra' Abu el-Naga', Theban Necropolis
- ← Previous; TT15 Next → TT17

G40 T14 s Z4
Panehesy
in hieroglyphs
Era: New Kingdom
(1550–1069 BC)

The Theban Tomb TT16 is located in Dra' Abu el-Naga', part of the Theban Necropolis, on the west bank of the Nile, opposite to Luxor. It is the burial place of the ancient Egyptian Panehsy, who was Prophet of Amenhotep (I) of the Forecourt, during the reign of Ramesses II.

Panehesy's wife is named Ternute (or Tarennu). A brother of Panehesy by the name of Pahesy appears in a scene with the procession of a vase of Amun.

The tomb is rather roughly hewn from the rock, and the decoration is poor. A scene of the barque of Amenhotep I has been almost totally destroyed, but other scenes showing Panehsy and his wife standing before Osiris are preserved.

== See also ==
- List of Theban tombs
- N. de Garis Davies, Nina and Norman de Garis Davies, Egyptologists
