= TT169 =

Theban tomb

Theban tomb TT169
- Burial site of Senna
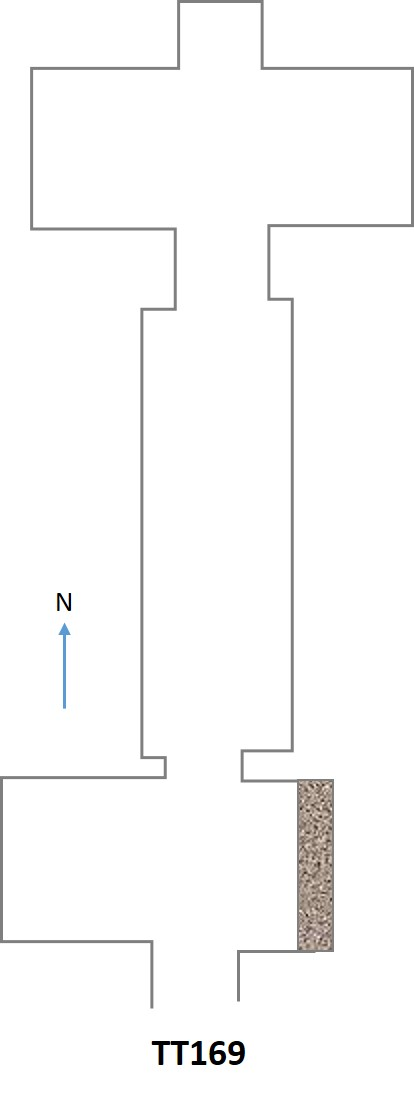

- Location within Egypt
- Location: Dra' Abu el-Naga', Theban Necropolis
- ← Previous; TT168 Next → TT170

T23 n A
Senna
in hieroglyphs
Era: New Kingdom
(1550–1069 BC)

The Theban Tomb TT169 is located in Dra' Abu el-Naga', part of the Theban Necropolis, on the west bank of the Nile, opposite to Luxor. It is the burial place of the ancient Egyptian Senna, who was the head of the goldworkers of Amun during the reign of Amenhotep II in the Eighteenth Dynasty.

Senna was the son of Sensonb and Tanub and his wife was named Maetka. His wife was a Divine Adoratrice of Amun.

The tomb consists of a hall and a passage. The hall is decorated with scenes and has texts on its vaulted ceiling. The passage contains scenes depicting Senna and his wife, an opening of the mouth scene and a daughter offering to Senna, his wife Tanub and his parents.

== See also ==
- List of Theban tombs
