= TT17 =

Theban Tomb

Coordinates: 25.7333°N 32.6000°E

Theban tomb TT17
- Burial site of Nebamun
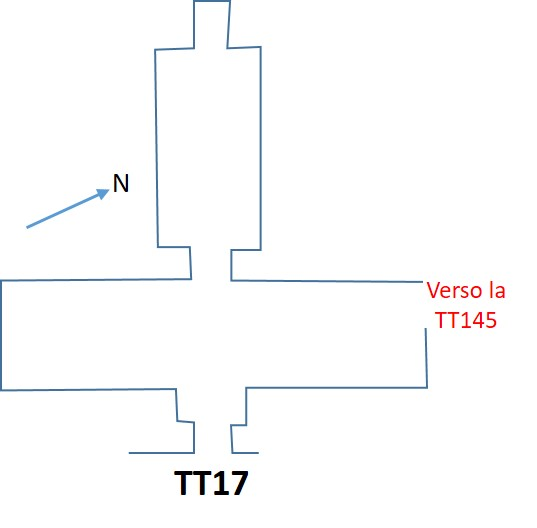

- Location within Egypt
- Location: Dra Abu el-Naga, Theban Necropolis
- ← Previous; TT16 Next → TT18

i mn n V30
Nebamun
in hieroglyphs
Era: New Kingdom
(1550–1069 BC)

The Theban Tomb TT17 is located in Dra Abu el-Naga, part of the Theban Necropolis, on the west bank of the Nile, opposite to Luxor. It is the burial place of the ancient Egyptian noble named Nebamun, who lived during the 18th Dynasty, during the reign of Amenhotep II. Nebamun was a scribe and a physician to the King.

Nebamun was the son of Nebseny, a judge, and Amenhotep (?). His wife's name is not completely preserved but resembles Ta[..]nefer.

The tomb consists of a hall and an inner room. The hall is decorated with scenes of the deceased offering to his parents, and scenes from his life. Men are shown filling granaries, women are baking bread, etc.

In the inner room funerary scenes show a procession, rites before the mummy and offerings.

== See also ==
- List of Theban tombs
- N. de Garis Davies, Nina and Norman de Garis Davies, Egyptologists
