= Kampp 150 =

Ancient Egyptian tomb in the Dra' Abu el-Naga' necropolis, Thebes

Kampp 150 is an ancient Egyptian tomb located in the Dra' Abu el-Naga' necropolis in Thebes. Based on a cartouche inscription, it probably dates back to the reign of Thutmose I of the Eighteenth Dynasty.

== The owner ==
Who built this tomb is not yet clear. It may have been occupied by a scribe named Maati and his wife Mehu, according to funerary cones found in its courtyard, This is highly unlikely since his cones are securely dated to the reign of Thutmosis III. Another possibility is a person named Djehutymes, whose name was found on one of its walls. He may have been the owner or a relative.

== History of archaeological work ==
The tomb is known since at least the 1990s and was registered as "Kampp 150" by Friederike Kampp-Seyfried during her survey in the years 1988/89. She gave a first account on the architecture and decoration of this funerary complex: It is a saff-tomb with an open courtyard and a four-pillared portikus, now mostly destroyed, a broad hall with a caved-in ceiling, and a long corridor, leading to the shaft room with a small niche in the middle of the back wall which was used as a chapel. A shaft is located in the northern half of this room. F. Kampp-Seyfried dated the tomb to the end of the 17th or beginning of the 18th Dynasty based on the architectural remains. Another tomb, Kampp 390, shares the courtyard with Kampp 150, but is probably later in date.
On December 9, 2017, the Ministry of State of Antiquities announced that the tomb was cleared from debris, along with Kampp 161, by a team of Egyptian archeologists.

=== Finds ===
A yet unidentified linen-wrapped mummy was found inside, along with funerary objects, like wooden statues and masks.

== Bibliography ==
F. Kampp, Die thebanische Nekropole. Zum Wandel des Grabgedankens von der XVIII. bis zur XX. Dynastie, Theben 13.1-2 (Mainz 1996), Vol. II, p. 701–702, Fig. 619 (ISBN 3-8053-1506-6)
