= TT15 =

Theban Tomb

Coordinates: 25.7333°N 32.6000°E

Theban tomb TT15
- Burial site of Tetiky
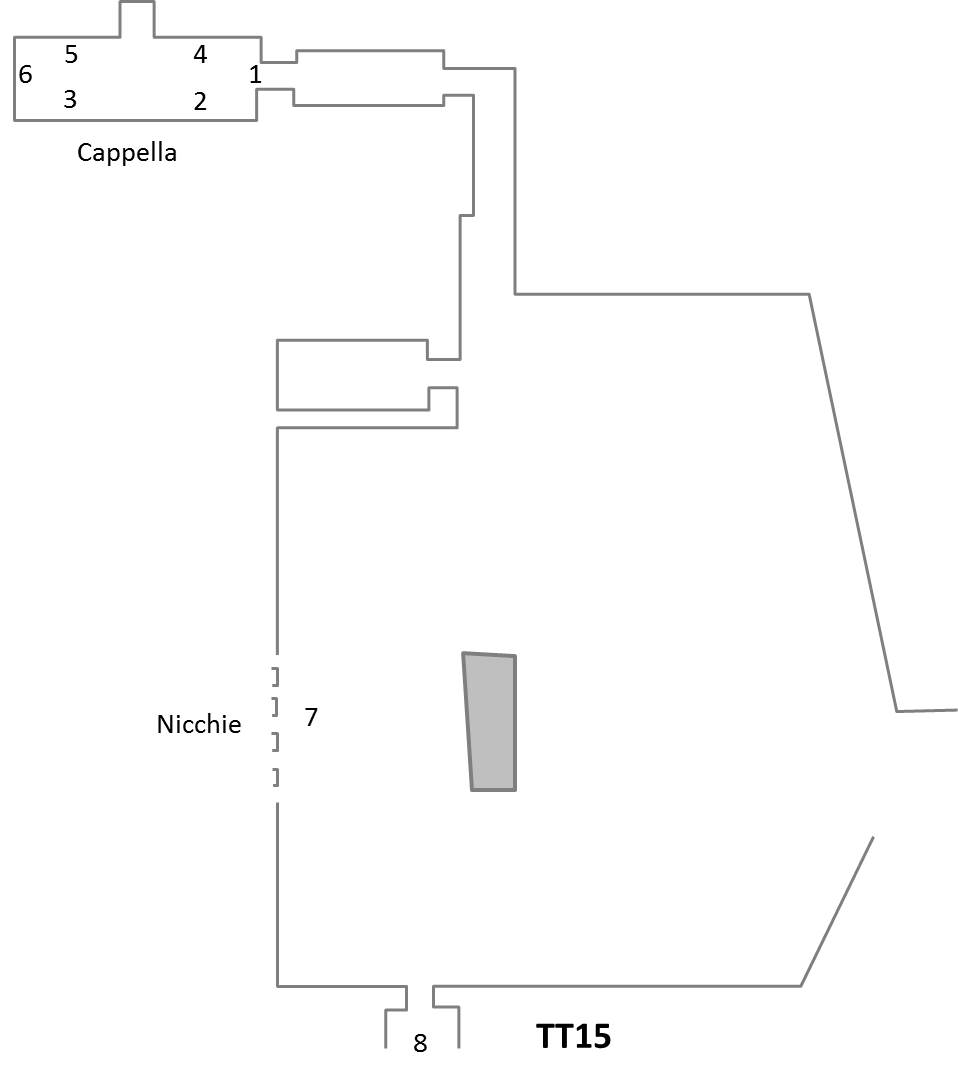
- Floor plan of TT15

- Location within Egypt
- Location: Dra' Abu el-Naga', Theban Necropolis
- Excavated by: Howard Carter (1908)
- ← Previous; TT14 Next → TT16

The Theban Tomb TT15 is located in Dra' Abu el-Naga', part of the Theban Necropolis, on the west bank of the Nile, opposite to Luxor. It is the burial place of the ancient Egyptian Tetiky, who was Mayor of Thebes, during the reign of Ahmose I, during the early Eighteenth Dynasty.

Tetiky was the son of Rahotep, overseer of the harem of the lake, and Sensonb. Tetiky's wife was named Senbi.

== Chapel and tomb ==
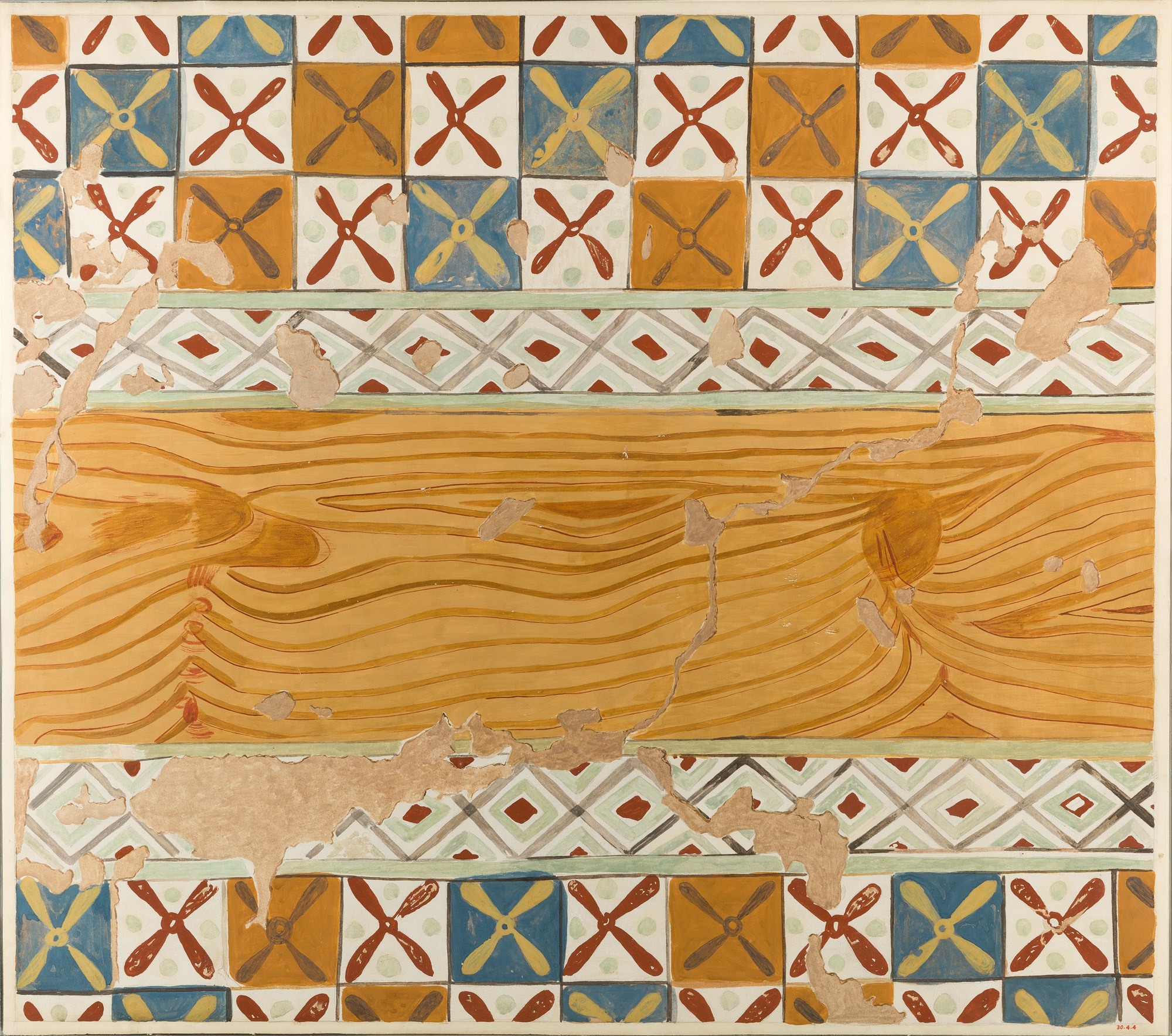
Facsimile of Ceiling Decoration MET 30.4.4 EGDP010671

t t i k i i
Tetiky
in hieroglyphs
Era: New Kingdom
(1550–1069 BC)

The chapel and tomb were excavated in the spring of 1908 by a team led by Howard Carter, excavating on behalf of his sponsor, Lord Carnarvon. The chapel and associated buildings are made of mud brick. The burial chambers are cut into the bedrock and are accessed by a single vertical shaft.

The decoration in this tomb shows the continued development of the royal image, showing as it does the King's Wife Ahmose-Nefertari, offering to Hathor, and having a double-Uraeus for the first time, an image that later became 'standard' royal iconography. The tomb has been damaged due to looting, and the Louvre have recently returned several decorated sections from the tomb.

== See also ==
- List of Theban tombs
