= Imhotep (crater) =

Crater on Mercury

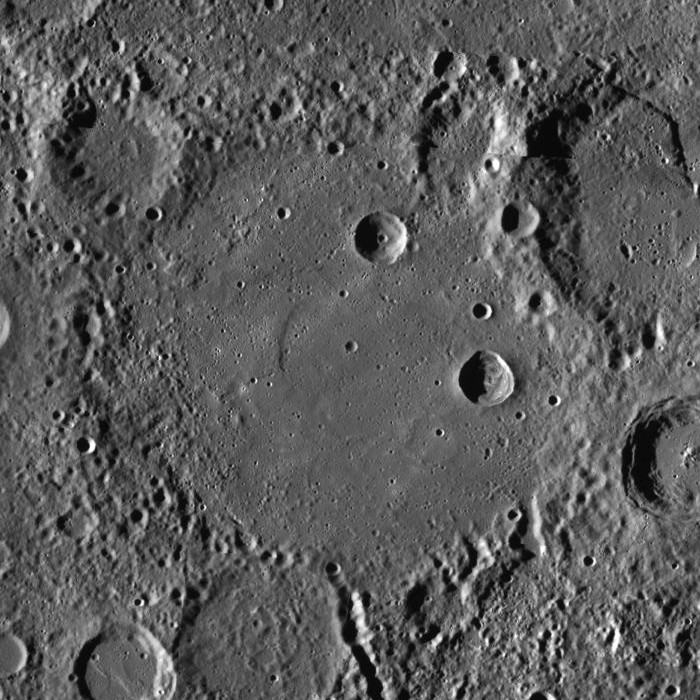
- MESSENGER WAC mosaic of Imhotep
- Feature type: Impact crater
- Location: Kuiper quadrangle, Mercury
- Coordinates: 17.97°S 37.48°W
- Diameter: 159 km (99 mi)
- Eponym: Imhotep

Imhotep is a crater on Mercury. It has a diameter of 159 kilometers. Its name was adopted by the International Astronomical Union in 1976. Imhotep is named for the Ancient Egyptian architect Imhotep, who lived from 2686 to 2613 BCE.

Imhotep is southwest of the bright crater Kuiper, and south of Ravel.

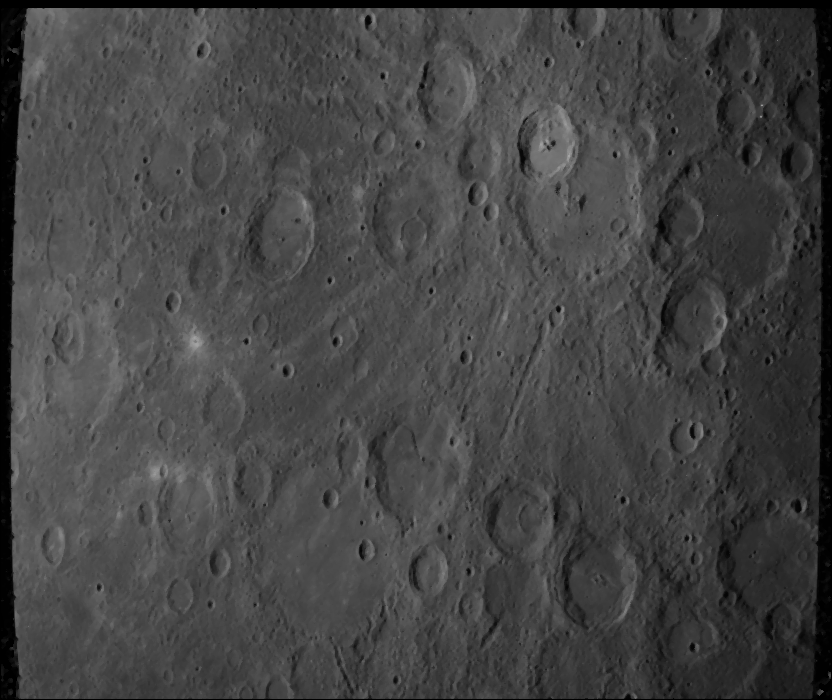
Mariner 10 image with Imhotep in lower left

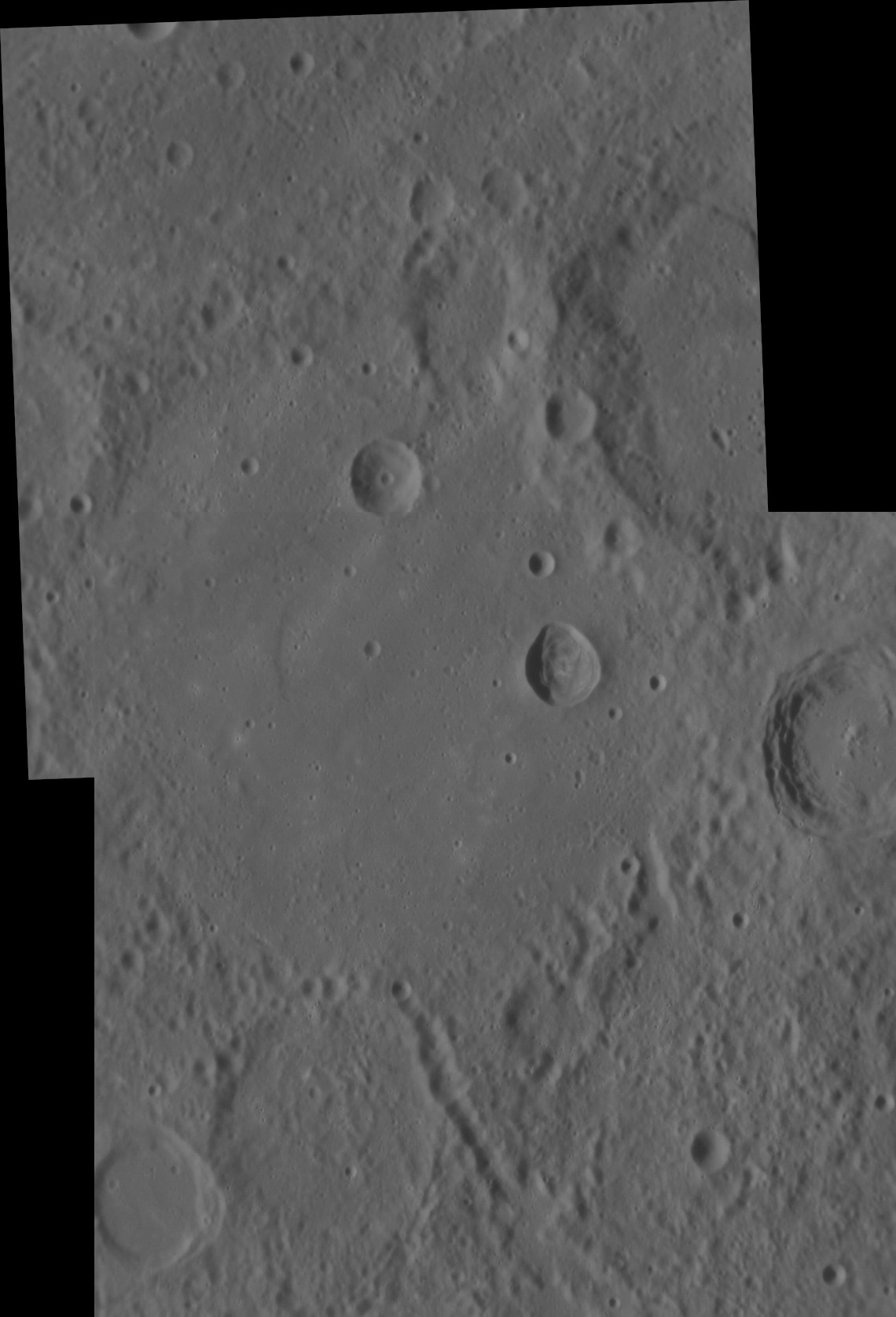
MESSENGER mosaic with different lighting than the image above
