= Simut =

Ancient Egyptian priest, Second Prophet of Amun

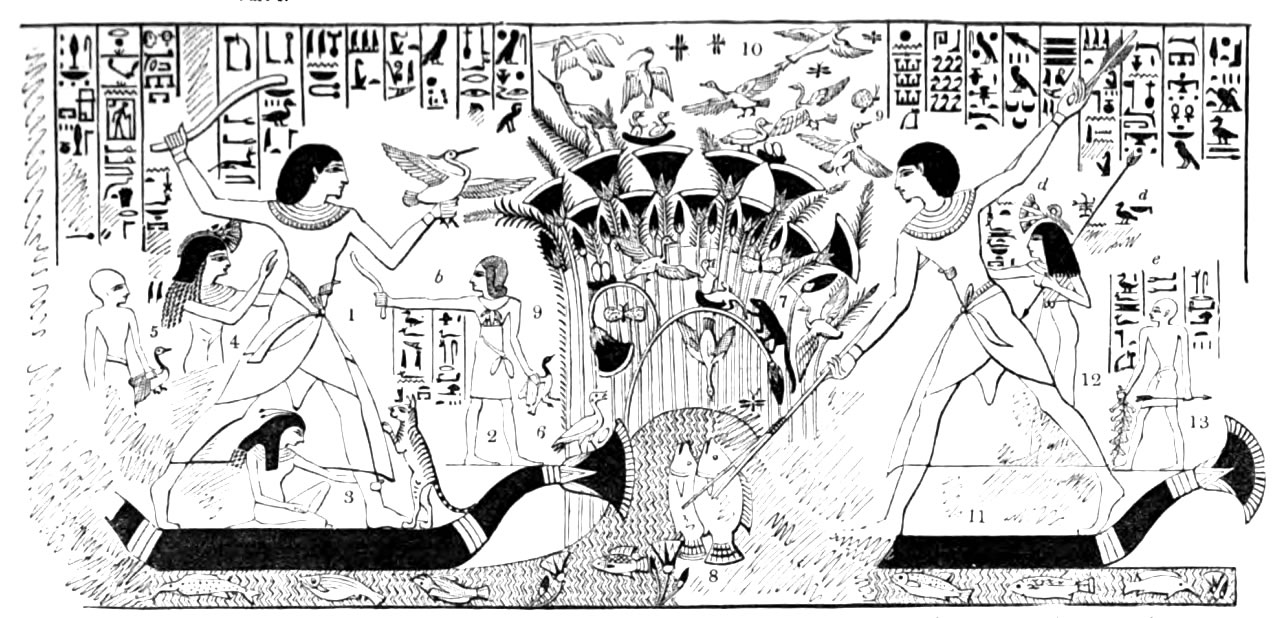
Scene in the tomb of Simut

Simut or Samut (“Son of Mut”) was an ancient Egyptian priest who held the position of Second Prophet of Amun towards the end of the reign of Pharaoh Amenhotep III. He is known from a number of objects, including his (now lost), Theban tomb chapel Tomb A.24.

He started his career as a wab priest in the temple of Amun and a porter of the god's processional shrine. In the 20th regnal year of Amenhotep he was already the Fourth Prophet of Amun, which means he was the fourth highest ranking priest in the most influential priesthood of the era. He was appointed Second Prophet in Year 34, it is likely that the previous holder of the title, Anen, the pharaoh's brother-in-law died around this time. Simut was also treasurer (“Overseer of the House of Silver”) and “sealer of every contract in Karnak”. His son also served Amun, as a wab priest.

He is depicted in the Theban tomb of Vizier Ramose among the mourners. His own tomb was discovered in the nineteenth century, but its location has since been lost.

== Sources ==
- David O’Connor, Eric H. Cline: Amenhotep III: Perspectives on His Reign. University of Michigan Press, 2001. ISBN 0-472-08833-5
