= Amenhotep =

Amenophis in hieroglyphs
i mn n Htp
Amenhotep / Imenhetep
(Imen hotep)
Ỉmn-ḥtp
One who pleases Amun

Amenhotep (Ỉmn-ḥtp; "One who pleases Amun") is an ancient Egyptian name. Its Greek version is Amenophis (Ἀμένωφις). Its notable bearers were:

== Pharaohs of the 18th dynasty ==
- Amenhotep I
- Amenhotep II
- Amenhotep III
- Amenhotep IV (Akhenaten)

== Princes ==
- Amenhotep A, a son of Sobekhotep IV (13th dynasty), named on a box (now in Cairo)
- Amenhotep D, a son of Amenhotep II (18th dynasty)
- Amenhotep F, princely name of Akhenaten
- Amenhotep G, a son of Ramesses II (19th dynasty), 14th on the list of princes

== Nobles ==
- Amenhotep (treasurer) treasurer of the 13th Dynasty
- Amenhotep (high steward), high steward of Hatshepsut (18th Dynasty)
- Amenhotep, son of Hapu, deified Ancient Egyptian architect (18th Dynasty)
- Amenhotep (18th dynasty High Priest of Amun)
- Amenhotep Huy, Governor of the Northern Oasis under Thutmose III (18th Dynasty)
- Amenhotep-Huy, Vizier of South under Amenhotep III (18th Dynasty)
- Amenhotep (Huy), the high steward of Memphis under Amenhotep III (18th Dynasty)
- Amenhotep called Huy, Viceroy of Kush under Tutankhamon (18th Dynasty)
- Amenhotep, son of Yuti, chamberlain under Amenhotep III (18th Dynasty)
- Amenhotep (Asyut), official and physician (19th Dynasty)
- Amenhotep (20th dynasty High Priest of Amun), High Priest from the 20th Dynasty
- Amenhotep, father of Queen Kakat (23rd Dynasty)

== Other ==
- The father of Rapses in Mummies Alive! is named Amenhotep (although which one is not specified)
- 4847 Amenhotep (the name of an asteroid)
- Ptolemaic era owner of a Book of the Dead from the Joseph Smith Papyri collection
- Imhotep, a similar name
