= Imhotep (vizier) =

Ancient Egyptian vizier, judge and governor of Thebes

- Vizier of the South
- Dynasty: 18th Dynasty
- Pharaoh: Thutmose I

Imhotep was the governor of the city (in Thebes), a judge and a vizier under Thutmose I. He was also said to be a tutor to the sons of the king.

== Tomb ==
Imhotep was buried in tomb QV 46 in the Valley of the Queens. The tomb was discovered by Ernesto Schiaparelli during an expedition which took place between 1903 and 1905. The tomb is a simple shaft with a single chamber that contained the burial. During the excavations his mummy was recovered along with funerary goods. The finds included coffin-fragments, a canopic jar inscribed with his name, and an alabaster oval plaque. These objects are now in the Museo Egizio in Turin, as well as mummified ducks in boxes, wooden boxes, and baskets found in the tomb.

Ostraca from the later Ramesside Period were recovered from near the tomb's entrance.

Objects in the collection of the Museo Egizio in Turin

Canopic jar of Imhotep (inv. Suppl. 5073).

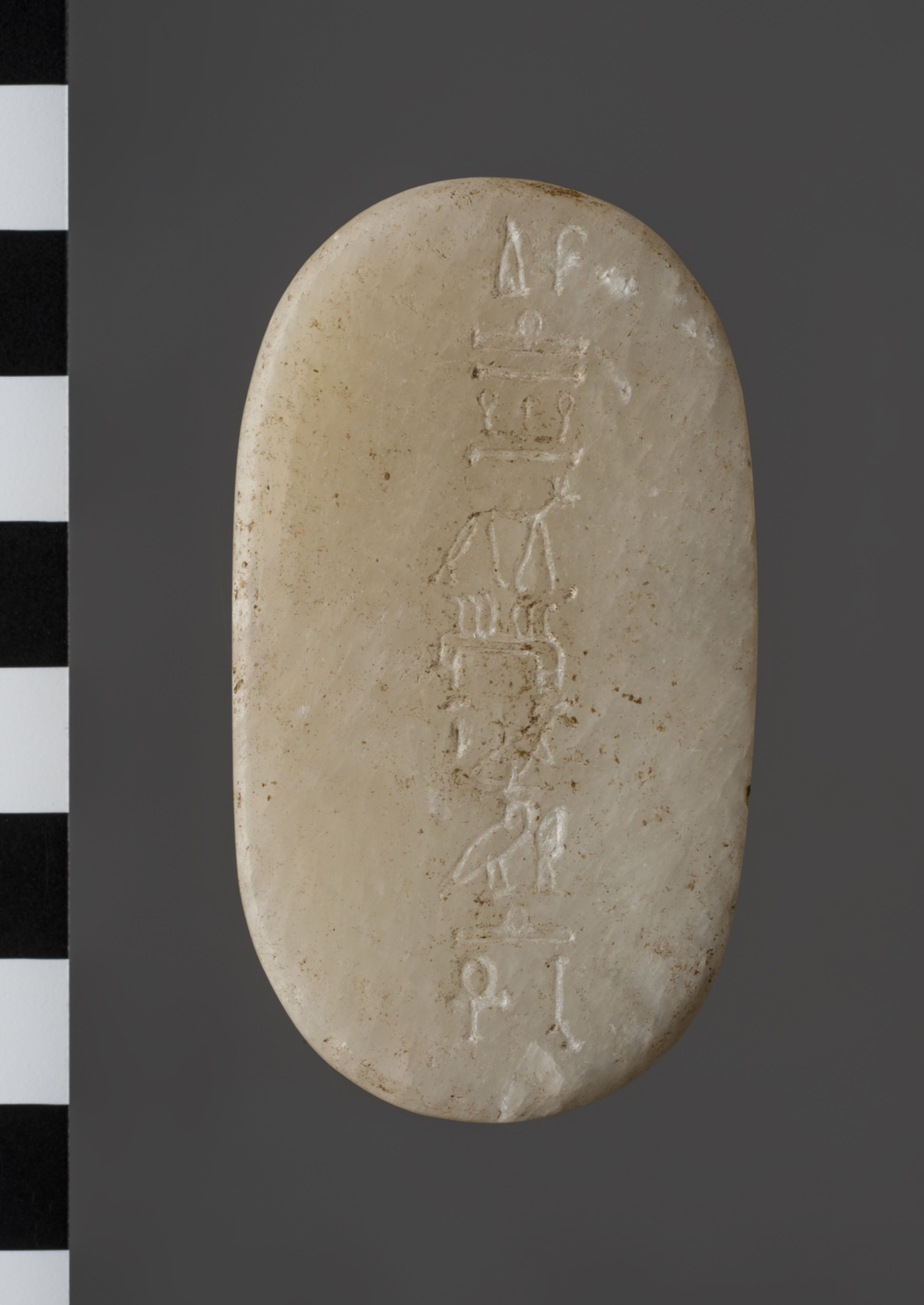
Plaque inscribed with the name and titles of Imhotep, calcite (inv. Suppl. 5074).

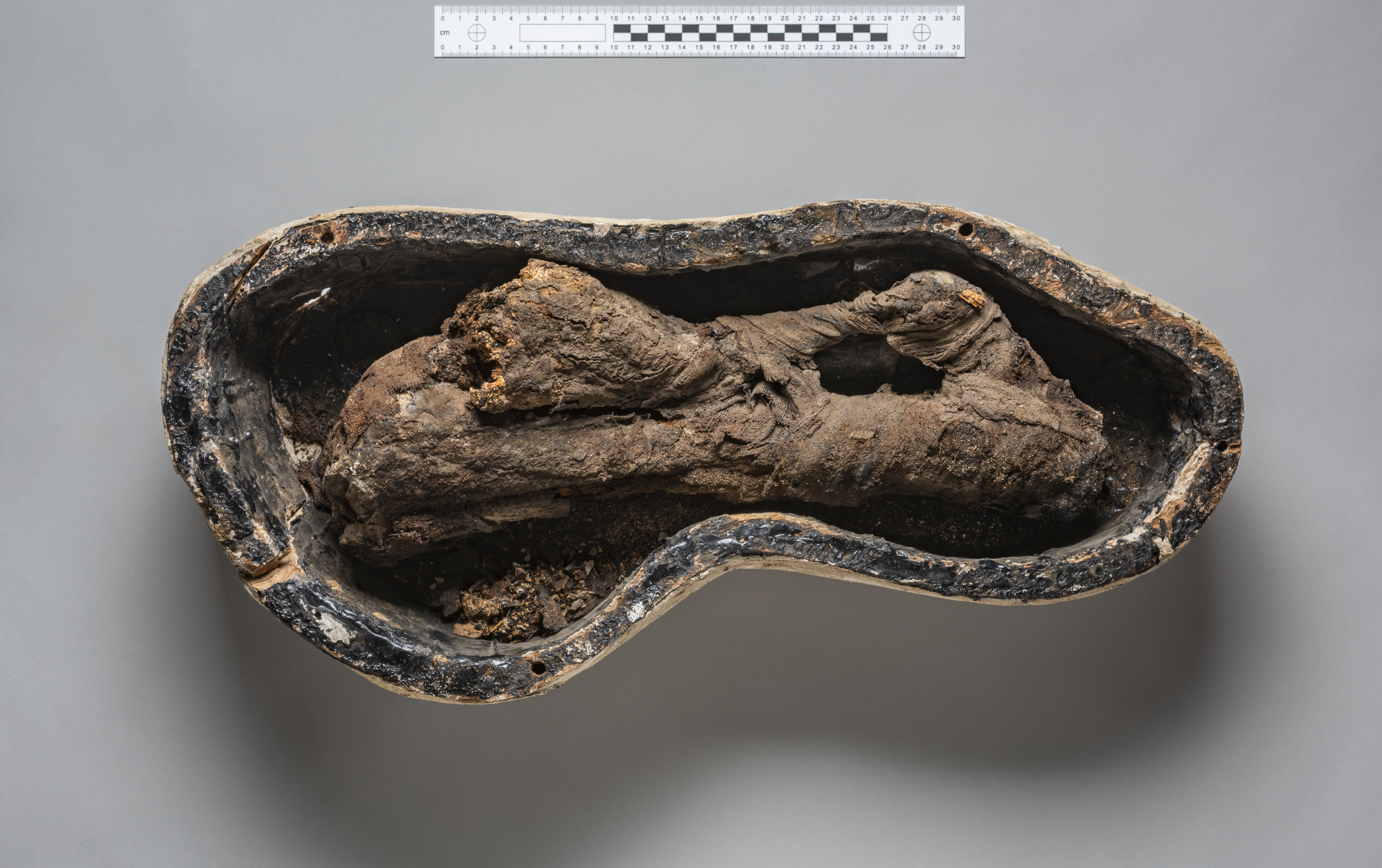
Container for mummified meat (beef thighs and ribs), inv. Suppl. 5078/02.
