= Djehuty (overseer of the treasury) =

Djehuty was an ancient Egyptian official under the ruling queen Hatshepsut (reigned about 1473–1458 BC). He bore several important titles that testify his high position at the royal court. His main title was overseer of the silver and gold houses. With this title he was the main person in charge of the treasury at the royal palace. He is attested from year 9 to year 16 of queen Hatshepsut. In year 9 he was involved in the queen's expedition to the foreign land called Punt (corresponding to modern-day Somalia) in Egyptian sources. In year 16 he was inlaying the gold for the obelisks of the queen, that were set up in this year. He was buried in a Theban tomb (TT11). From his tomb are preserved two stelae, one of them with a longer autobiographical inscription reporting mainly building activities in Amun temple at Karnak. At the end of his career, Djehuty and his family fell into dishonor, and attempts were made to erase his memory. His name is most often erased within his tomb. His parents are the lady of the house Dediu and the zab Abty. The names of the parents are erased too, as are the names of other family members.
